= Yashima =

Yashima may refer to:

== Places ==
- Yashima, Akita
- Yashima, Kagawa, a place in Takamatsu, Kagawa
- Yashima, a former name of Takamatsu, Kagawa

== Other uses ==
- Battle of Yashima
- Japanese battleship Yashima
- Operation Yashima
- Yashima-ji, a Shingon temple in Yashima, Kagawa
- Yashima (surname)
- Yashima Station (disambiguation)
- Yashima, "eight islands", a nickname for Japan
