= Awa Tanuki Gassen =

Japanese legend from the late Edo period

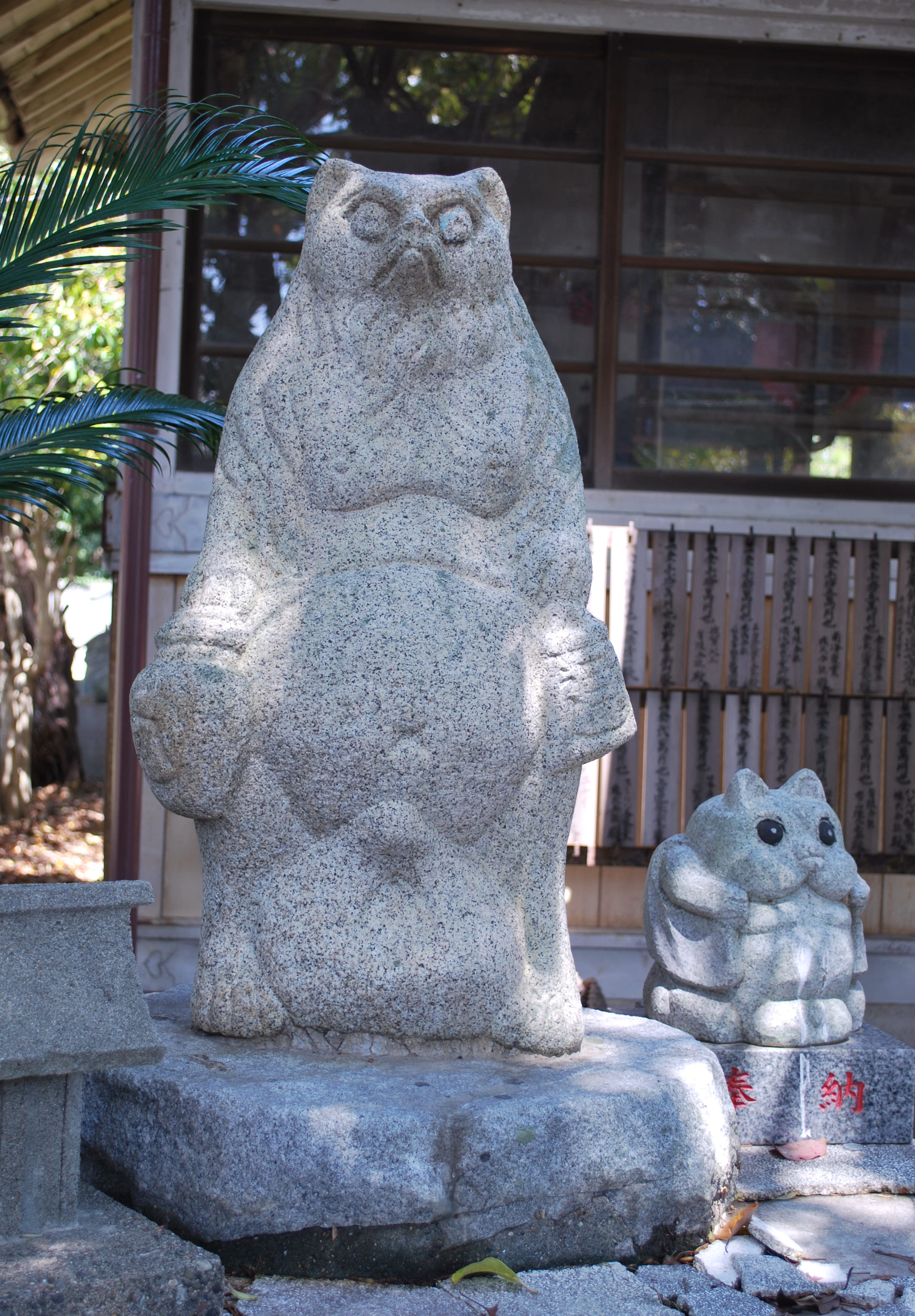
Statue of Kinchō at Kinchō Jinja

The Awa Tanuki Gassen (阿波狸合戦) (The Tanuki War of Awa) is a Japanese legend about a great war between bake-danuki (magical tanuki) that supposedly occurred in the late Edo period in Awa Province (now Tokushima Prefecture). It is also known as the Awa no Tanuki Gassen (阿波の狸合戦) and the Kinchō Tanuki Gassen (金長狸合戦) (The Kinchō Tanuki War).

It is one of the most famous tanuki legends among the many found in Shikoku, and often considered the most renowned tanuki story from Tokushima. The story is believed to have originated in the late Edo period. Literary records exist in three handwritten manuscripts from the late Edo period: 『近頃古狸珍説』 (Chikagoro Furudanuki Chinsetsu), 『古狸金長義勇珍説』 (Furudanuki Kinchō Giyū Chinsetsu), and 『金長一生記』 (Kinchō Isshōki), though their exact dates are unknown. The legend gained widespread circulation through kōdan (narrative storytelling) transcriptions published in Meiji 43 (1910): 『四国奇談実説古狸合戦』 (Shikoku Kidan Jissetsu Furudanuki Gassen), 『津田浦大決戦』 (Tsudaura Dai-kessen), and 『日開野弔合戦』 (Higaino Tomurai Gassen). Popularized through kōdan from the Meiji era until the wartime period and later through films in the early Shōwa period, the legend has become a theme for community development (machizukuri) in Tokushima Prefecture since the Heisei era and remains beloved by its residents.

== Legend ==
Based on the traditions of Kinchō Jinja (detailed below) and the book Awa no Tanuki no Hanashi by Tokushima-born archaeologist Kasai Shin'ya, the legend can be summarized as follows:

During the Tenpō era (1830–1844), in Higaino, Komatsushima (now Kandaise-chō, Komatsushima City), a man named Moemon (茂右衛門), who ran a dyeing shop called Yamatoya (大和屋), saved a tanuki from being tormented by people. Soon after, Yamatoya's business began to prosper greatly. Eventually, a tanuki possessed Mankichi (万吉), an employee at the shop, and revealed its identity. The tanuki called himself Kinchō (金長), the 206-year-old leader of the local tanuki. Possessing Mankichi, Kinchō became renowned for healing the sick and performing divination for customers, achieving great fame.

Some time later, Kinchō, who had not yet attained a formal rank among tanuki, decided to seek training under Rokuemon (六右衛門), the tanuki generalissimo residing in Tsuda (then Tsudaura, Saitsu Village, Myōdō District, now Tsuda-chō, Tokushima City). Kinchō excelled in his training and was on the verge of attaining the coveted rank of Senior First Rank (正一位, Shōichii). Rokuemon, reluctant to lose such a promising pupil, attempted to keep Kinchō by his side by arranging a marriage with his daughter, making Kinchō his son-in-law and heir. However, Kinchō refused, citing his obligation to Moemon and his dislike for Rokuemon's cruel nature.

Angered by the refusal and fearing Kinchō would become a future rival, Rokuemon plotted against him. Along with his retainers, Rokuemon launched a surprise night attack on Kinchō. Kinchō fought back, aided by another tanuki from Higaino named Fuji no Kidera no Taka (藤ノ木寺の鷹, "Hawk of Fuji-no-ki Temple"). However, Taka was killed in the battle, and Kinchō barely managed to escape back to Higaino.

Moemon, grieving that Kinchō had died just before achieving the Senior First Rank, personally traveled to the Yoshida Shinto Ritualists (吉田神祇管領所, Yoshida Jingi Kanryōsho) in Kyoto and successfully petitioned for Kinchō to be posthumously awarded the rank.

During the time of the conflict, rumors spread among humans that Kinchō's army was gathering in the sacred forest (鎮守の森, Chinju no mori) preparing to attack Rokuemon. When curious onlookers visited the forest at dusk, they heard a great clamor as if many beings were jostling together in the darkness. The next morning, countless tanuki footprints covered the ground, convincing people that the tales of the tanuki war were indeed true.

== Variations ==
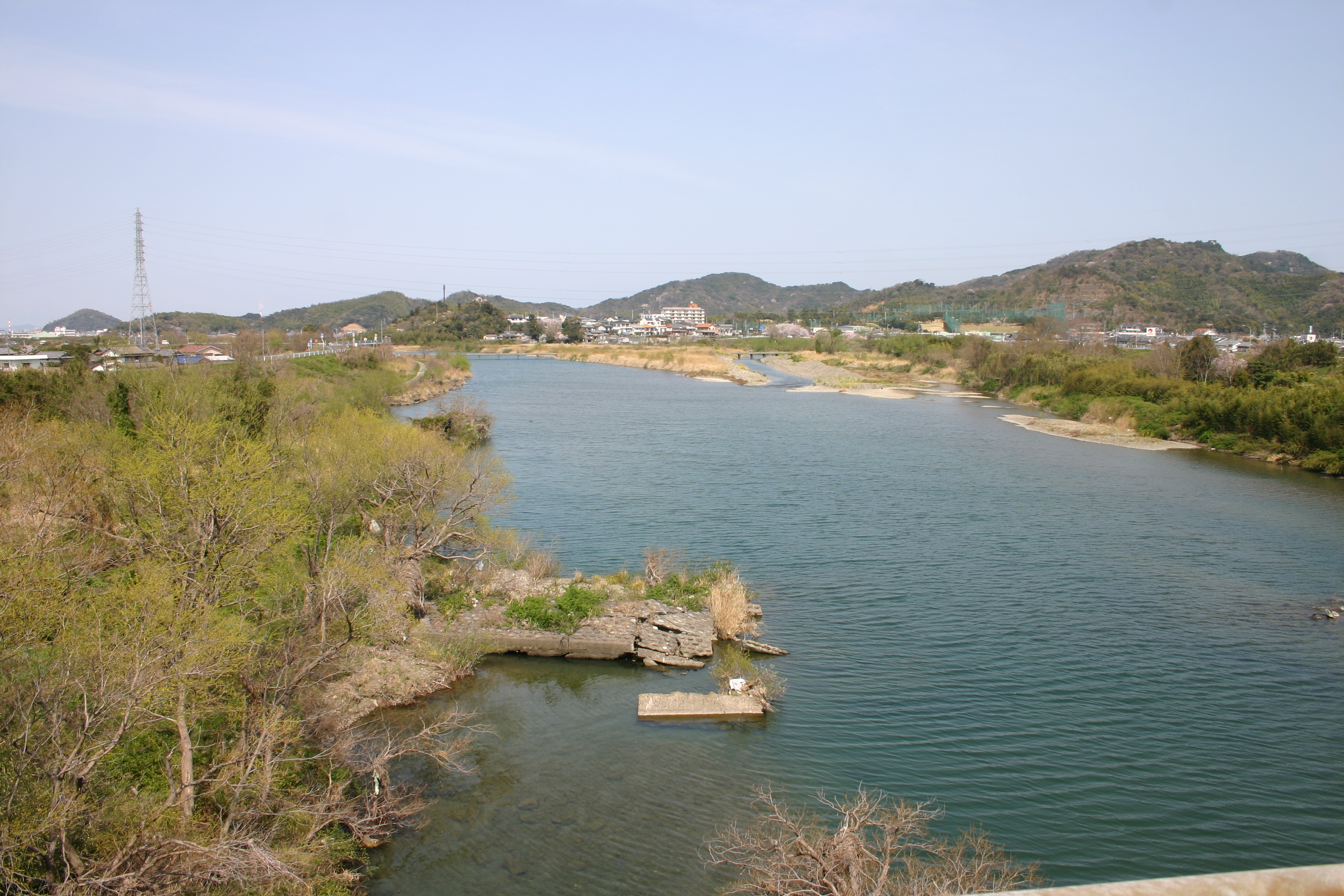
The Katsuura River, said to be the main site of the battle.

The legend exists in several variations across different sources, possibly due to the influence of later kōdan narratives on the original oral traditions.

- Rokuemon's Daughter: Rokuemon's daughter is named Koyasuhime (小安姫). Deeply in love with Kinchō, she pleaded with her father not to attack him. When her pleas failed, she committed suicide to protest her father's actions and express her guilt. However, her death only fueled Rokuemon's hatred for Kinchō. Upon learning of the death of Koyasu, who had loved him, Kinchō's resolve to defeat Rokuemon hardened.
- Scale of the Battle: The main battle occurred across the Katsuura River, with Kinchō's army numbering over 600 tanuki and Rokuemon's also exceeding 600. The fierce fighting lasted for three days and three nights.
- Other Participants: Shibaemon-tanuki, a famous bake-danuki from Awaji Island, is said to have headed towards Awa to join the battle. (One tale relates that Shibaemon stopped at Kannō-ji temple in Nikenya disguised as a samurai to watch a play, but was bitten by a dog and killed, his corpse remaining in samurai form for three days. This episode likely borrows from a similar story associated with Shibaemon at the Naka-za theater in Osaka.)
- Kinchō's Death: One version states that despite suffering fatal wounds, Kinchō desperately made his way back to Higaino to express his gratitude to Moemon one last time before dying. Moved by Kinchō's loyalty, Moemon enshrined him as a Daimyōjin (Great Luminous Deity).
- Kinchō's Spirit: Another variation claims that the dying Kinchō became a spirit, possessed Mankichi, and vowed to eternally protect Moemon's household as a deity out of gratitude even after death. Deeply moved, Moemon enshrined him as a Daimyōjin.
- Aftermath: After the deaths of Kinchō and Rokuemon, a second conflict, a "mourning war" (弔い合戦, tomurai gassen), erupted between Kinchō's successor (often considered his son or the second Kinchō) and Rokuemon's son. However, the great bake-danuki Tasaburō-tanuki (also known as Yashima no Hage) from Yashima in Sanuki Province (now Yashima, Takamatsu, Kagawa) intervened and mediated, finally bringing the conflict to an end.

== Origins ==
One theory suggests the legend originated from an existing local tale of animal gratitude (動物報恩譚, dōbutsu hōontan) from the Tenpō era, where a tanuki saved by the Yamatoya shop owner repaid the kindness. Later, the factual event of a large number of tanuki carcasses being found on the banks of the Katsuura River one year was incorporated. These elements were then supposedly combined and dramatized, possibly in the style of kōdan, into the story of a great clash between the two tanuki powers, Kinchō and Rokuemon.

Alternatively, some interpret the story as an allegory for human conflicts. The struggles, tragic love, and rivalries depicted are common in human society, suggesting the tanuki war might be a projection of real-world human events onto animal characters.

Specific historical conflicts have been proposed as models:

- Shugendō Conflict: Disputes existed between different sects of Shugendō practitioners based on Tokushima's sacred mountains. The manuscript Furudanuki Kinchō Giyū Chinsetsu mentions rock-throwing (投石, tōseki), a combat tactic used since the Middle Ages. This leads to the theory that the tanuki war represents a conflict between Shugendō groups associated with Tairyū-ji temple (represented by Kinchō) and Mount Tsurugi (represented by Rokuemon). This could reflect a clash between a Tairyū-ji-based group attempting to expand north and a Mount Tsurugi-based group moving south.
- Aizome Sand Dispute: Tokushima Prefecture was a center for aizome (Japanese indigo dyeing), a process requiring sand. Sand from the Tsudaura area was considered ideal. This theory posits the tanuki war symbolizes a conflict over access to these valuable sand resources between communities on opposite sides of the Katsuura River.
- Fishing Rights Dispute: Another theory suggests the legend is based on disputes over fishing rights between the Tsuda district and Komatsushima. Asakawa Yasutaka, the head priest of Tsuda-ji Temple (home to Rokuemon-related sites), supports this fishing rights theory.

If these theories based on human conflicts are correct, the somewhat endearing tanuki characters might actually be reflections of foolish human behavior.

While the veracity of the tanuki war itself is legendary, Moemon is confirmed to have been a real person. The 1939 film Awa Tanuki Gassen was based on both the kōdan transcriptions and oral accounts passed down within the family of Moemon's direct descendants. Furthermore, some suggest that the incident of the tanuki possessing Mankichi was a real, separate event, later woven into the tanuki war narrative by kōdan storytellers.

== Related Lore ==
According to tradition in Tokushima Prefecture, during the era of the Tokushima Domain, a toki no taiko (time-keeping drum) was used to announce the hour. However, in the Tomita Ōmichi area of the castle town (now Ōmichi, Tokushima City), the drum was never struck at the Hour of the Serpent (around 10 AM, corresponding to "four" in older counting), and in the Teramachi area, it was never struck at the Hour of the Monkey (around 4 PM, corresponding to "six"). This was supposedly because Kinchō's successor (the second Kinchō) was enshrined as "O-Yotsu-san" ("Mr./Ms. Four") at a subsidiary shrine of the Konpira Shrine in Tomita Ōmichi, and a female tanuki connected to the war was enshrined as "O-Roku-san" ("Mr./Ms. Six") at Myōchō-ji Temple in Teramachi. It was believed that striking the drum at the hour corresponding to their names would invoke a curse. An alternative explanation for the silence at the sixth hour in Teramachi is that Rokuemon's successor (the second Rokuemon) was enshrined there.

== Historical Sites and Landmarks ==
=== Kinchō Jinja ===
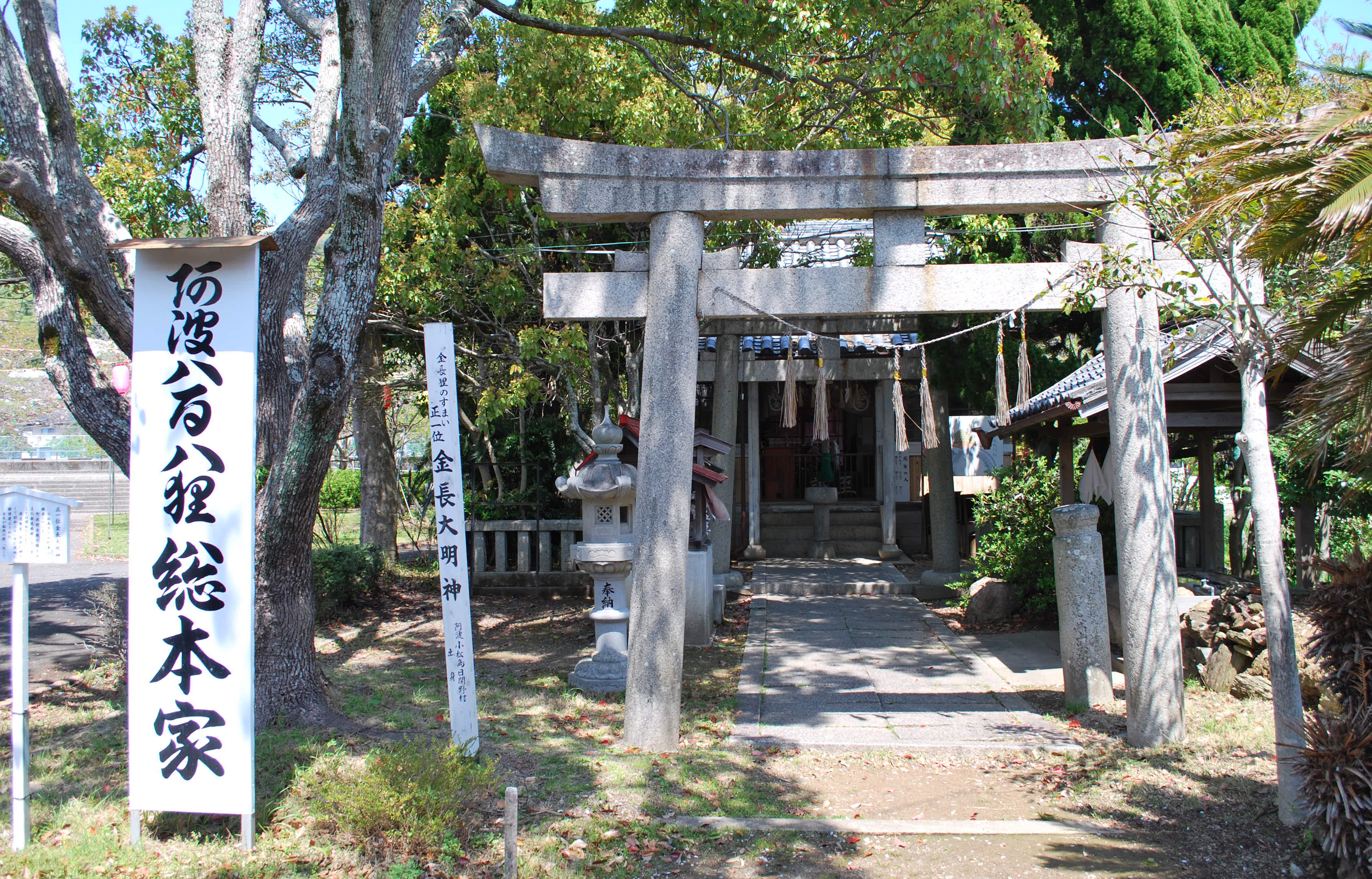
Kinchō Jinja shrine in Nakata-chō, Komatsushima

In May 1939 (Shōwa 14), following the massive success of the film Awa Tanuki Gassen, Kinchō Jinja Shrine (later known as Kinchō Jinja Hongū - the original shrine) was established in the mountains of Mount Himi (日峰山, Himine-san) as an expression of gratitude. The annual "Kinchō Rei Taisai" (Kinchō Grand Festival) began at the shrine in 1946 (Shōwa 21), and in 1955 (Shōwa 30), the "Kinchō Hōsankai" (Kinchō Reverence Association) was formed to organize the yearly festival honoring Kinchō.

In 1956 (Shōwa 31), Komatsushima City, seeking to honor Kinchō's virtue of profound gratitude and loyalty (報恩感謝, hōon kansha) and to develop him as a tourism resource, requested the relocation of the Kinchō Daimyōjin shrine, which until then had been a private household shrine (屋敷神, yashikigami) in the garden of Moemon's descendants, the Umeyama family. The shrine was moved to Nakata-chō within the city, and the new Kinchō Jinja was formally established the following year, 1957 (Shōwa 32). Nagata Masaichi, who had been the studio head at Shinkō Kinema during the production of the 1939 film and was president of Daiei Film at the time of the shrine's construction, regarded Kinchō as the savior who rescued the nearly bankrupt Shinkō Kinema. He donated a then-staggering one million yen, which covered most of the construction costs. The names of Nagata, as well as popular actors like Ramon Mitsusaburō, Kazuo Hasegawa, and Machiko Kyō, are inscribed on the shrine's ornamental fence (玉垣, tamagaki).

Kinchō Daimyōjin is revered as the "Hōtoku Tanuki" (報徳狸, Gratitude-Repaying Tanuki) for his loyalty to Moemon, and is also known as a god of good fortune and protection (開運守護, kaiun shugo). He is particularly believed to grant blessings for business prosperity. It is one of the most representative tanuki shrines in Tokushima. Locals often refer to him affectionately as "Kinchō-san," interacting with him with a familiarity distinct from typical deities. The shrine appears in the Studio Ghibli animated film Pom Poko. Reflecting Kinchō's protection of the Yamatoya, descendants of Moemon have served as the shrine's priests (宮司, gūji) since its establishment. As of 2014, the priest was the 6th generation descendant from Moemon.

Being more accessible than the original shrine (Hongū) deep in the mountains, the Kinchō Jinja in Nakata-chō attracts worshippers not only from Tokushima but also from the Kansai region. It continues to receive visitors even in recent years. Meanwhile, the Kinchō Jinja Hongū on Mount Himi is less known today due to its mountain location, and the fact that there are two Kinchō shrines in Komatsushima is not widely recognized.

In 2017 (Heisei 29), facing potential demolition due to urban redevelopment plans in Komatsushima, a group of volunteers formed the "Kinchō Jinja o Mamoru Kai" (Association to Protect Kinchō Jinja). They conduct activities, including using blogs and Twitter, under the names "Kotaka" (小鷹, Little Hawk) and "Kumadaka" (熊鷹, Bear Hawk), who were Kinchō's tanuki followers in some versions of the legend, to raise awareness and support for preserving the shrine.

=== Other sites ===
Relating to Rokuemon's side:

- Tsuda-ji Temple (津田寺): Located in Tsuda Nishimachi, Tokushima City, the temple grounds contain a cave known as Ana Kannon (穴観音, Cave Kannon), said to have been Rokuemon's stronghold. Rokuemon himself is enshrined nearby as Rokuemon Daimyōjin in a small shrine (祠, hokora), which is frequently visited and maintained by locals. Shrines dedicated to his son, Senjutarō (千住太郎), and daughter, Kanoko (鹿の子), also exist, indicating the entire family is venerated as deities.
- Gon'emon's Shrine: Tsuda-ji also enshrines a tanuki named Gon'emon (権右衛門), who is said to have lived at the temple and fought and died as a general for Rokuemon during the war. A stone statue marks his shrine.
- Ōhara-chō Battlefield Site: In Chiyogamaru, Ōhara-chō, the purported site where Kinchō and Taka fought Rokuemon's pursuers and Taka was killed, is marked as the "Awa Tanuki Kosenjō Ato" (阿波狸古戦場跡, Site of the Old Awa Tanuki Battlefield). Shrines to Taka Daimyōjin and Manri Daimyōjin (萬狸大明神, Myriad Tanuki Great Deity) are located here.
- Shinhama Honchō Battlefield Site: Near 2-chōme, Shinhama Honchō, Tokushima City, on the north side of the Katsuura River, another marker designates the "Awa Tanuki Gassen Kosenjō" (阿波狸合戦古戦場, Awa Tanuki War Old Battlefield). A shrine to Takabōzu Daimyōjin (高坊主大明神) stands here. This area is considered the main battlefield where, after fierce fighting, tanuki corpses supposedly filled the riverbed.

== Related works and cultural impact ==
=== Kōdan (Narrative Storytelling) ===
In the late Meiji period, Kanda Hakuryū, a prominent kōdan storyteller active in Osaka, performed the legend on stage, bringing it to national attention as urban entertainment. His performances were transcribed by the stenographer Maruyama Heijirō and published in 1910 (Meiji 43) as a three-volume set: 『実説古狸合戦』 (Jissetsu Furudanuki Gassen, True Tale of the Old Tanuki War), 『古狸奇談津田浦大決戦』 (Furudanuki Kidan Tsudaura Dai-kessen, Strange Tale of the Old Tanuki: The Great Tsudaura Decisive Battle), and 『古狸奇談日開野弔い合戦』 (Furudanuki Kidan Higaino Tomurai Gassen, Strange Tale of the Old Tanuki: The Higaino Mourning War). Around the same time, another popular tanuki kōdan was the tale of Inugami Gyōbu from Matsuyama, Iyo Province (now Ehime Prefecture), titled 『松山騒動八百八狸物語』 (Matsuyama Sōdō Happyakuya-danuki Monogatari). However, that story featured human protagonists, whereas Hakuryū's Awa Tanuki Gassen was notable for centering on the tanuki themselves as main characters.

Hakuryū's kōdan largely followed the oral tradition's plot but enhanced it with detailed descriptions of actions and added dialogue, increasing the realism of battle scenes. A key feature was portraying the tanuki not just as comical animals but as warriors with human-like emotions and motivations. Many scenes absent from the original legends appear in the kōdan, likely creative additions. For example, the kōdan includes a detailed battle between the second-generation Kinchō and Rokuemon, featuring complex military strategies unlikely for tanuki. Since no pre-kōdan sources describe this, it is considered a fabrication by the storyteller, who specialized in military chronicles (軍記物, gunki-mono). Hakuryū himself acknowledged that parts of his version differed from the original sources.

The kōdan's popularity coincided with the period of the First Sino-Japanese War, a time when tales of military campaigns, bravery, and revenge resonated with the public. The narrative of tanuki helping each other, fighting honorably, and sometimes dying heroic deaths likely felt relatable to audiences. Additionally, tanuki leaders like Kinchō and Rokuemon, often enshrined as local deities and featured in numerous anecdotes, were familiar figures. Sharing stories about these local heroes may have strengthened community bonds among those who shared the same knowledge and regional identity.

Over 80 years later, in 1996 (Heisei 8), a renewed version titled "Ritai Kōdan Awa Tanuki Gassen" (立体講談・阿波狸合戦, Three-Dimensional Kōdan: Awa Tanuki War) was performed in Komatsushima. In 1998 (Heisei 10), Komatsushima City initiated a project to train citizens as storytellers (語り部, kataribe) to preserve this cultural heritage. Professional kōdan performers and scriptwriters were invited from Tokyo to lead workshops. A recital held in 1999 was highly successful. After the official program ended in 1999, twenty graduates formed the "Komatsushima Kataribe Kyōkai Otogi-shū" (小松島語り部協会・御伽衆, Komatsushima Storytellers Association - Narrators Group) the same year. They performed kōdan and humorous skits at nursing homes and community events, eliciting both laughter and tears. However, due to aging membership and other factors, by 2008 only the group's original representative remained active as a storyteller.

=== Film ===
Kōdan's peak popularity faded around 1904 (Meiji 37), and the tanuki story found new life in the emerging medium of film.

- Awa Tanuki Gassen (1939): Produced by Shinkō Kinema, directed by Suzu Kita Rokuhei, starring Ramon Mitsusaburō. The film was a major box-office success, credited with saving the studio from impending bankruptcy. Its title is also seen as solidifying "Awa Tanuki Gassen" as the standard name for the legend, which had previously been known by various names like Awa no Tanuki Gassen or Ashū Tanuki Gassen.
- Zoku Awa Tanuki Gassen (続阿波狸合戦, Awa Tanuki Gassen Sequel, 1940): Also by Shinkō Kinema, directed by Suzu Kita Rokuhei, starring Ōtani Hideo. This sequel was also a big hit.
- Awa Tanuki Yashiki (阿波狸屋敷, Awa Tanuki Mansion, 1952): Produced by Daiei Film, directed by Kōzō Saeki, starring Yūji Hori.
- Awa Odori Tanuki Gassen (阿波おどり狸合戦, Awa Dance Tanuki War, 1954): Produced by Daiei Film, directed by Bin Kato, starring Kurokawa Yataro. A remake of the 1939 film.
- Awa Tanuki Henka Sōdō (阿波狸変化騒動, Awa Tanuki Transformation Commotion, 1958): Produced by Shintōhō, directed by Masaki Mōri, starring Jūzaburō Akechi.
- Pom Poko (平成狸合戦ぽんぽこ, Heisei Tanuki Gassen Ponpoko, 1994): An animated film by Studio Ghibli. While set in the Tama Hills outside Tokyo, it draws heavily on tanuki folklore, featuring elder tanuki from Shikoku named the Sixth Kinchō (六代目金長, Rokudaime Kinchō), Tasaburō Hage-tanuki, and Inugami Gyōbu. Kinchō plays a central role, and Kinchō Jinja appears in the film.

Tanuki-themed films continued to be produced and remained popular through the 1950s and 1960s.

In 2011 (Heisei 23), the Media Design Department of the Faculty of Human Life Sciences at Tokushima Bunri University produced an animated adaptation of the Awa Tanuki Gassen. The project was suggested by painter and professor emeritus Iihara Kazuo. As part of a regional revitalization initiative, screenings of the first part were held in December 2011, and it was also shown during Iihara's painting exhibition at the Tokushima Castle Museum in 2012 (Heisei 24).

=== Other Media ===
The legend continues to be adapted into new formats. In 2015 (Heisei 27), an e-book version was released, produced by students at Tokushima Bunri University with illustrations and text by Iihara Kazuo. It is accessible for free without registration on the Tokushima City Digital Library website.

== Influence on Local Communities (Machizukuri) ==
=== Komatsushima City ===
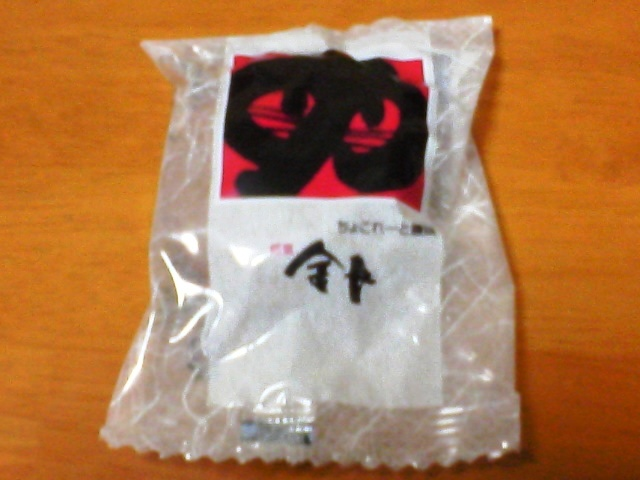
Kincho Manjū confectionary

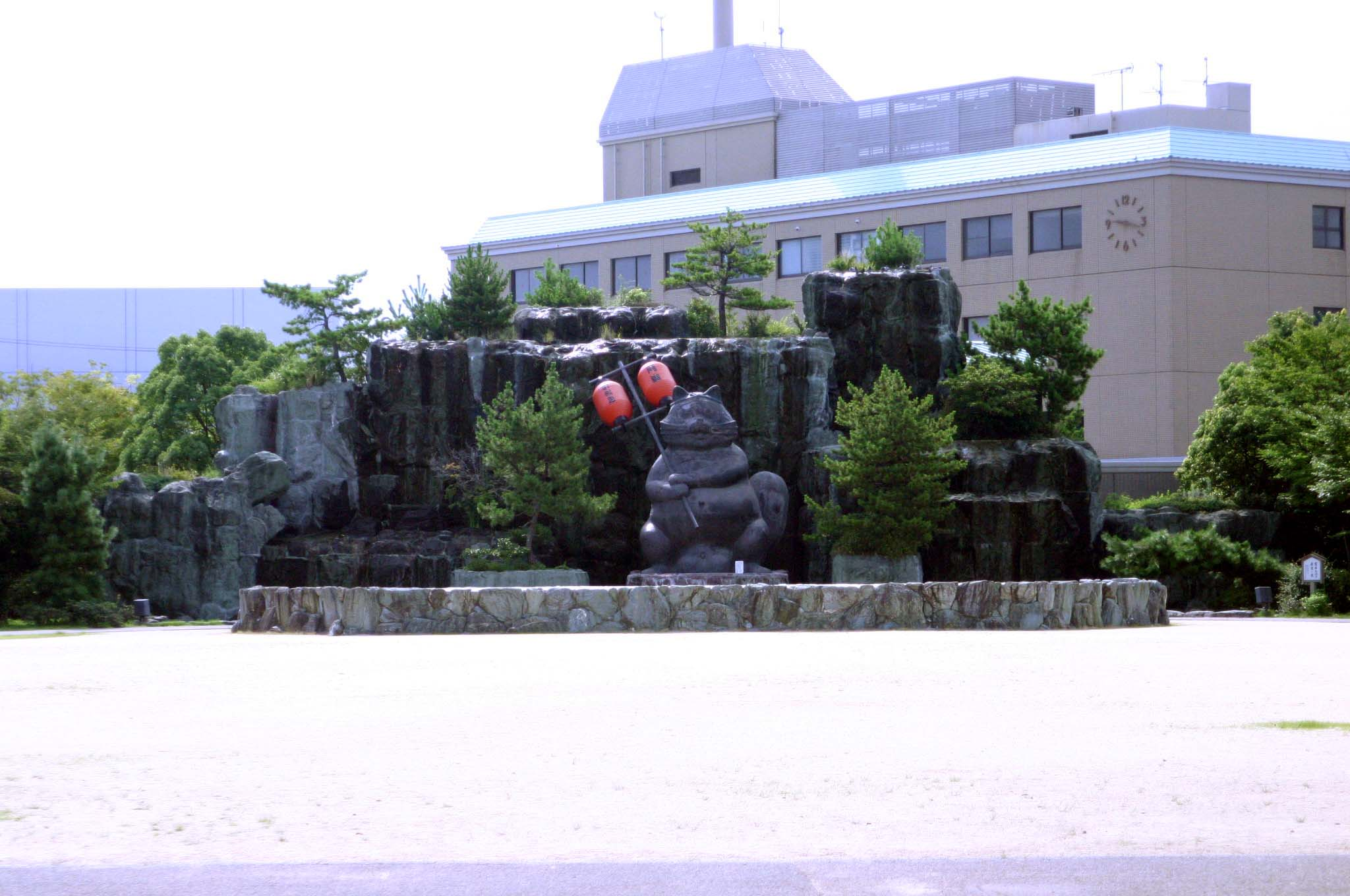
Komatsushima Station Park with the giant Kinchō statue

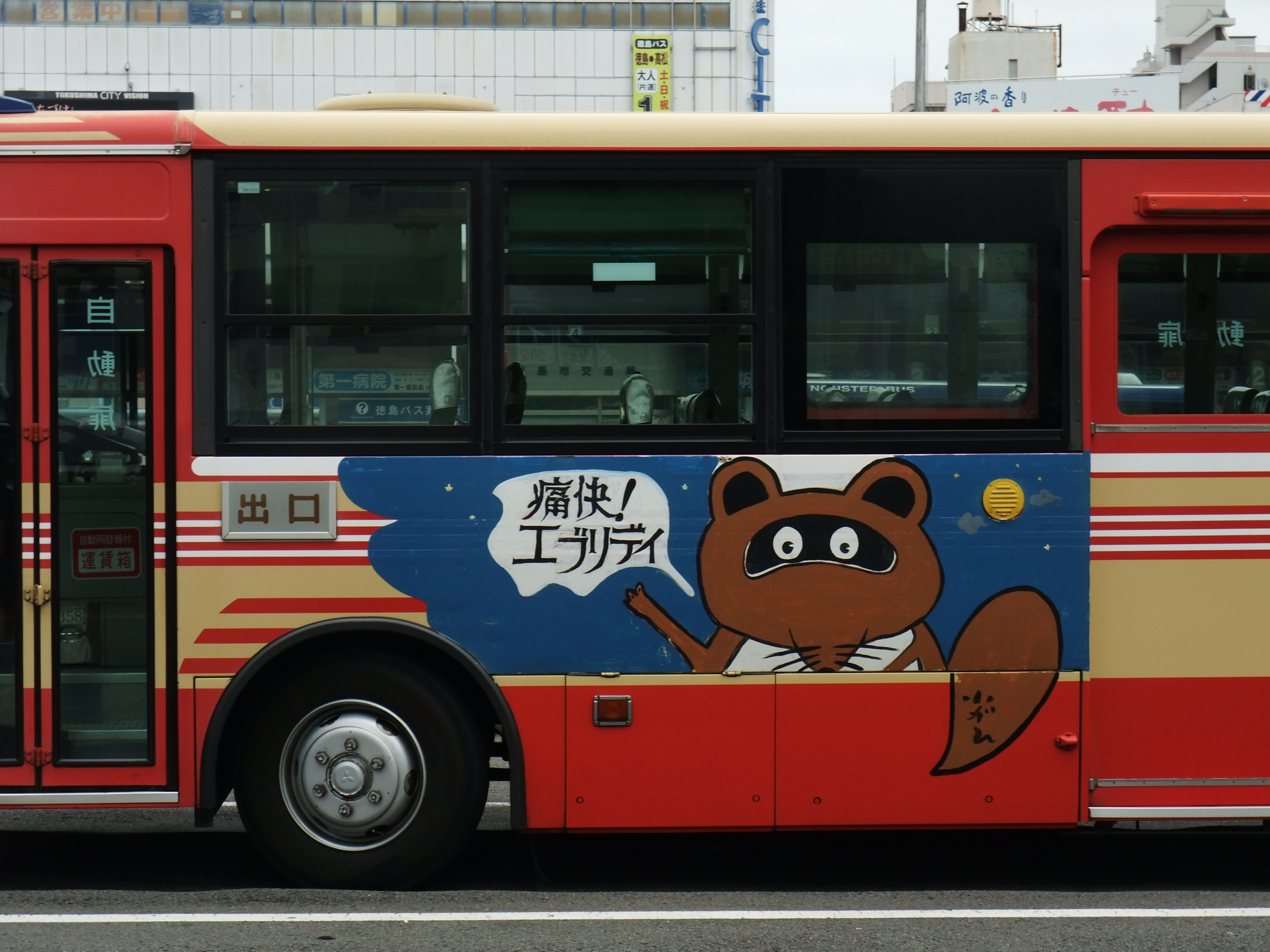
A tanuki-themed bus operated by the Komatsushima City Transportation Department

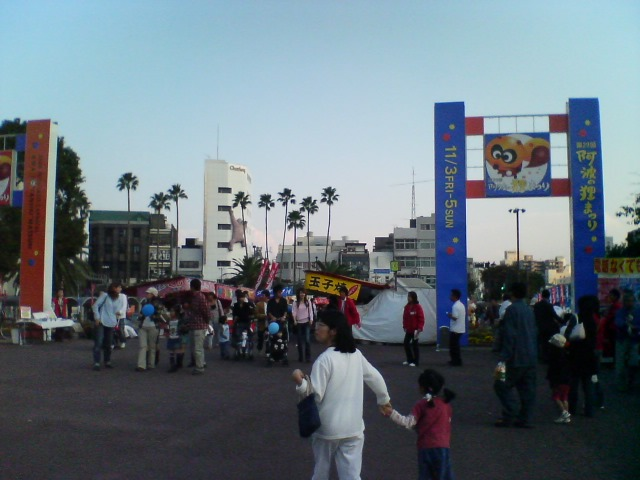
Awa no Tanuki Matsuri

Komatsushima City actively utilizes the Awa Tanuki Gassen legend and related sites for community development (machizukuri). Tanuki serve as the town's symbol, with monuments and wall art visible throughout the city.

- Kincho Manjū: This confectionary, themed after Kinchō and produced by Hallelujah Confectionary, is a representative souvenir of Komatsushima. Created with the idea "Komatsushima means Kinchō Tanuki," it became hugely popular, riding the wave of the 1939 film's success.
- Post-Railway Revitalization: The closure of the former JNR Komatsushima Line in 1985 (Shōwa 60) spurred discussions about regional revitalization centered around local folklore. The loss of this railway line, which connected the port city to the main Mugi Line at Chūden Station, was seen as a potential major blow to the local economy. This prompted increased efforts in revitalization, leading to the proliferation of tanuki-related initiatives.
- Kincho Tanuki Post Office: One early initiative was the renaming of the "Komatsushima Shin-minato Post Office" to "Kincho Tanuki Yūbinkyoku" (金長だぬき郵便局) in 1989 (Heisei 1). It became the first post office in Japan named after an animal, generating national attention. The then-postmaster, inspired by the 1939 film, had been promoting Kinchō through postcards and other activities. With support from local organizations, his proposal to rename the post office during renovations was approved by the Shikoku Postal Services Bureau (now Japan Post Shikoku Branch), recognizing his long-standing efforts. Approval involved considerable debate within the Ministry of Posts and Telecommunications due to the lack of precedent. Tanuki-themed postcards, stamps, and postmarks issued for the opening attracted huge interest from philatelists nationwide. Mailboxes adorned with tanuki statues can also be found in the city.
- Kincho Daiko: In 1991 (Heisei 3), a group of young locals formed the "Kincho Daiko" (金長太鼓) taiko drumming group, inspired by Kinchō Tanuki. Their performances are described as cheerful, bright, and entertaining, breaking the mold of traditional taiko.
- Komatsushima Station Park Statue: In 1993 (Heisei 5), the world's largest bronze statue of Kinchō was unveiled in Komatsushima Station Park. Standing 5 meters tall, with a circumference of 5 meters and weighing 5 tons, it serves as a symbol of Komatsushima and is popular with tourists. While Shigaraki ware tanuki figurines are famous, and Shigaraki (now Kōka City, Shiga Prefecture) has an 8-meter tall ceramic tanuki, the Komatsushima statue is the world's largest bronze tanuki. The park also features stone statues of other tanuki from the legend.
- Tanuki Buses: In 1994, coinciding with the release of Pom Poko, city buses operated by the Komatsushima City Transportation Department (小松島市運輸部) were decorated with tanuki designs as part of a wall art project. Due to positive reception, more buses were decorated, eventually reaching five, which operate within the city.
- Festivals: The "Kincho Matsuri" (金長まつり) is held around Kinchō Jinja during the Golden Week holidays in May, featuring events like a tanuki mikoshi parade and Kincho Daiko performances. The Awa no Tanuki Matsuri (阿波の狸まつり), held annually in November, is a major event attracting over 200,000 visitors. Tokushima Vortis, the local professional soccer team whose mascot is a tanuki, participates with booths, contributing to the festive atmosphere.
- Koma-pon Mascot: In 2012 (Heisei 24), the city introduced "Koma-pon" (こまポン), a yuru-chara (mascot character) based on Kinchō. The name was chosen from suggestions submitted by local elementary school students. Koma-pon depicts Kinchō dressed in armor inspired by Minamoto no Yoshitsune, wielding a chikuwa made from bamboo (a local specialty) instead of a sword. He serves as Komatsushima's tourism PR mascot, promoting the city via Facebook and other activities. That same year, a dish called "Koma-pon Yaki," featuring bamboo chikuwa, was developed by the city's Urban Revitalization Committee.

=== Tokushima City (Tsuda District) ===
In the Tsuda district of Tokushima City, Kinchō's rival, Rokuemon, is embraced as the local symbol. In the legend, Kinchō is often portrayed as righteous and loyal (due to repaying Moemon's kindness), while Rokuemon, partly due to the influence of the 1939 film, has often been cast as the villain. This portrayal has caused dissatisfaction among some Tsuda residents. However, perceptions have evolved; even in Komatsushima, where Rokuemon was once strongly viewed negatively, the post-war era of peace has led some to re-evaluate him, acknowledging his role as Kinchō's teacher.

- Rokuemon Manjū: As a counterpart to the Kincho Manjū, the Yoshimoto Kogetsudō confectionary shop in Tsuda Nishimachi produces "Rokuemon Manjū" (六右ヱ門饅頭), which is their signature product. Unlike their legendary counterparts, the creators of the two manjū were colleagues and friends. Yoshimoto Toshiaki (d. 1982), founder of Yoshimoto Kogetsudō and creator of the Rokuemon Manjū, and Oka Takeo (d. 1996), founder of Hallelujah Confectionary and creator of the Kincho Manjū, reportedly discussed their ideas when Oka was launching his product, as Yoshimoto had already begun selling his.
- Rokuemon Matsuri: Since 1995 (Heisei 7), the Tsuda District Social Welfare Council has organized the "Rokuemon Matsuri" (六右衛門まつり) as a community revitalization event. It features food stalls, children's taiko performances, Awa Odori dancing, and performances of the "Tsuda no Bon Odori," a prefecturally designated Intangible Folk Cultural Property, enjoying popular acclaim.
- Symbolic Reconciliation: At the 20th Rokuemon Matsuri in 2014 (Heisei 26), with cooperation from the Komatsushima Chamber of Commerce, a "Declaration of Exchange between Rokuemon Tanuki and Kinchō Tanuki" was announced. A Rokuemon costumed character appeared and shook hands with Komatsushima's Koma-pon mascot, symbolizing a "reconciliation" between the rival tanuki factions after 170 years of legendary conflict.
