= Brian George =

Israeli-British actor (born 1952)

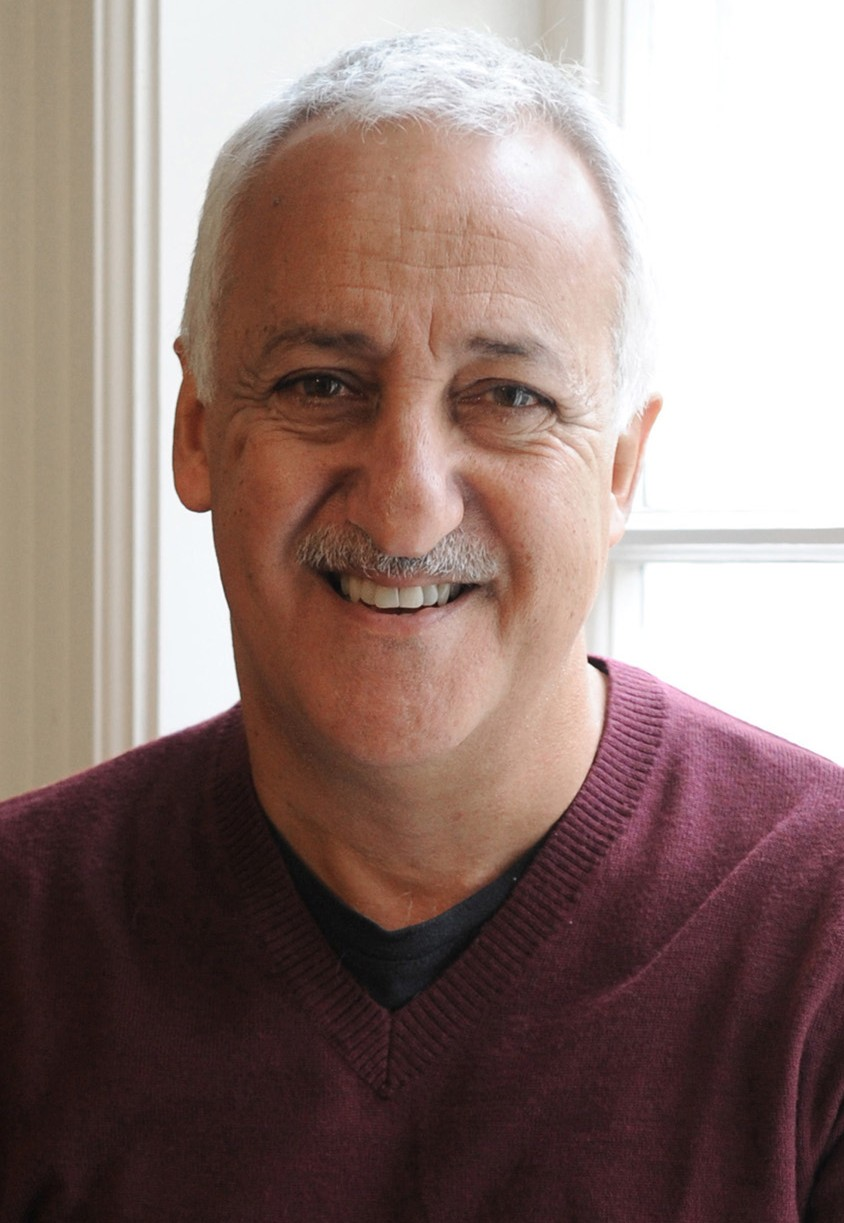
- George at the 2011 Canadian Film Centre
- Born: 1 July 1952 (age 74); Nahariya, Israel
- Education: University of Toronto
- Occupation: Actor
- Years active: 1984–present

Brian George (born 1 July 1952) is an Israeli British actor.

== Early life ==
George was born on 27 July 1952 in Nahariya, Israel, to Mizrahi Jewish parents of Indian-Jewish and Iraqi-Jewish descent, who immigrated to Israel. His father was born in Iraq and grew up in Mumbai, India, in a multi-religious family, with his half-sister being Muslim. His mother was born in India. A year after his birth, the family moved from Israel to London and then, in 1966, to Toronto, Ontario, Canada.

The youngest of four siblings, George attended an all-boys school in London and then a public co-ed high school when the family moved to Toronto. He attended the University of Toronto, where he was active in theatre productions. He left before graduation and formed a theatre group. When it failed to succeed, he moved on to join The Second City, where he trained with John Candy, among others.

== Career ==
George appeared as a United Nations secretary in Austin Powers: International Man of Mystery, as Julian Bashir's father in the Star Trek: Deep Space Nine episode "Doctor Bashir, I Presume?", and on a recurring basis as Raj's father in The Big Bang Theory. In 2006, he landed a recurring role as Sasan's father Omid in So NoTORIous. He also provided the voice of Bob Fish in the last two series of Bob and Margaret.

He appeared on numerous other sitcoms, including three episodes of Seinfeld as Babu Bhatt. He also appeared in two episodes of Ellen as Ranjit, a member of the book club that gathers in Ellen's book shop.

He had a recurring role as newsman Hugh Persons on Doctor, Doctor during its second season.

He made a guest appearance in the first season of Gene Roddenberry's Andromeda as Wayist religious leader Vikram Singh Khalsa. He also appeared in One Tree Hill as Brooke's taxi driver when she goes to launch her clothes line in New York.

George has done voiceover work in animated shows such as Batman: The Animated Series (as musician turned gangster Jimmy "The Jazzman" Peake); Handy Manny; Kim Possible as antagonist Duff Killigan, a Scotsman who uses exploding golf balls when attacking Kim and Ron Stoppable, Kim's sidekick; Avatar: The Last Airbender as Guru Pathik; Batman Beyond; Justice League (voicing Parasite, in a style similar to the first voice actor of Parasite, Brion James), Morgan Edge and President George W. Bush), MASK, Invader Zim, and Jedi Master Ki-Adi Mundi in Season 2 of Star Wars: The Clone Wars. He has also appeared in video games like Star Wars: Knights of the Old Republic, Baldur's Gate, Ultimate Spider-Man, Mass Effect 3, EverQuest II and Final Fantasy XIV. Early in his acting career, he was among the cast of 1985's The Care Bears Movie, and made guest appearances in the Canadian television series The Edison Twins, The Littlest Hobo, Comedy Factory and King of Kensington.

He also took over the voice of Bob Fish in the Anglo-Canadian animated comedy series Bob and Margaret and Pugg in the 1993 revival series of The Pink Panther. He played a guru in the film Inspector Gadget who trains with Inspector Gadget.

He also made a small guest appearance in the second season of The Mentalist in episode 16 entitled "Code Red". He played a professor working at the Northern California Technology Institute. His other appearances include the role of Mr. Pashmutt on Desperate Housewives (in the 2005 episode "You Could Drive a Person Crazy") and Ali on American Dad! (in the 2005 episode "Stan of Arabia: Part 2"). He also appeared on The 4400 in the third-season episode "The Starzl Mutation". Also appeared in the St. Valentine's Day episode of Grey's Anatomy as a carrier waiter in love with another patient.

He also voiced Sahin the Falcon, Stuart Black and Colonel Edwardson in the Age of Empires III series. He plays a short tempered convenience store owner in the 2001 film Ghost World. He also plays the role of "Iqbal" in the 2006 film Employee of the Month. He also voiced Captain Barbossa in the video game Kingdom Hearts II, a role he would reprise in Pirates of the Caribbean: The Legend of Jack Sparrow, Pirates of the Caribbean: At World's End, Disney Infinity, and Kingdom Hearts III.

He played "Pushpop", an Indian ice cream vendor, in the 2001 film Bubble Boy. He also played the culturally diverse (Sikh-Catholic-Muslim mix with Jewish in-laws) bartender who counselled the priest played by Edward Norton through a crisis of faith in the 2000 film Keeping the Faith. In the 2008 indie romantic comedy Shades of Ray, he played the overbearing Pakistani father to a half-Pakistani, half-Caucasian (Zachary Levi) in the midst of questioning his prior policy of only dating white women.

He also was the foster father of Ricky in the television series The Secret Life of the American Teenager.

In The Penguins of Madagascar, George guest stars as the zoo doctor in "Needle Point", "I Was a Penguin Zombie", "Operation: Cooties", "Love Hurts", and "I Know Why the Caged Bird Goes Insane".

He also appeared on Disney Channel show That's So Raven as Dr. Sleevemore, a "psychic doctor" who treats Raven's vision-related problems. He appeared in two episodes.

He also appeared on the Disney Channel show Phineas and Ferb on the hour long special "Summer Belongs To You" as Uncle Sabu, voiced Mr. Kumar on the Disney Junior show Handy Manny, and voiced a character on the Disney Channel show Mickey Mouse.

George regularly voiced several characters on DC Nation's Green Lantern: The Animated Series, including Appa Ali Apsa, LANOS, and Brother Warth. He also appeared in Beware the Batman as the villain Professor Pyg, and in Sly Cooper: Thieves in Time as Sly's ancestor Salim Al-Kupar.

In 2013, George took up a recurring role in Once Upon a Time in Wonderland as an unnamed prisoner who is later revealed to be the Sultan of Agrabah and father of Jafar.

He guest starred in SpongeBob SquarePants in the episode "Drive Happy" as Coupe, an arrogant and sarcastic sentient car that SpongeBob buys.

George reprised his role as Doctor Sleevmore in the That's So Raven spin-off Raven's Home for a three episode special.

== Filmography ==
=== Film ===
Year	Title	Role	Notes
1985	The Care Bears Movie	Mr. Fetuccini, additional voices	Voice
1987	Roxanne	Doctor	
1987	Blind Date	Maitre d'	
1988	Palais Royale	Gus	
1989	Speed Zone	Valentino Rosatti	
1993	Robin Hood: Men in Tights	Dungeon Maitre'D	
1994	Pom Poko	Kincho Daimyoujin the Sixth, Yashimano Hage	2005 English dub
1997	Austin Powers: International Man of Mystery	UN Secretary	
1998	Batman & Mr. Freeze: SubZero	Additional voices	Direct-to-video
1999	Inspector Gadget	Sore Guru	
2000	The Prime Gig	Nasser	
2000	Keeping the Faith	Paulie Chopra	
2001	Ghost World	Sidewinder Boss	
2001	Bubble Boy	Push Pop	
2004	Touch of Pink	Hassan	
2006	Crumbs	Dry Cleaner	
2006	Employee of the Month	Iqbal Raji	
2008	Batman: Gotham Knight	O'Fallon, Arman, Scruffy Man	Voice, direct-to-video
2009	Superman/Batman: Public Enemies	Gorilla Grodd	Voice, direct-to-video
2010	Batman: Under the Red Hood	Ra's al Ghul Assistant	Voice, direct-to-video
2012	Justice League: Doom	Mayor	Voice, direct-to-video
2012	Hotel Transylvania	Suit of Armor	Voice
2012	Delhi Safari	Bat	English dub
2014	Batman: Strange Days	Hugo Strange	Voice, short; uncredited
2014	Postman Pat: The Movie	Ajay Baines	Voice
2014	The Boxtrolls	Boulanger	Voice
2014	Beethoven's Treasure Tail	Trentino	
2016	Batman: The Killing Joke	Alfred Pennyworth	Voice
2019	Batman vs. Teenage Mutant Ninja Turtles	Alfred Pennyworth	Voice
2023	Batman: The Doom that Came to Gotham	Alfred Pennyworth	Voice
2023	Merry Little Batman	Penguin	Voice; direct-to-streaming film
2025	The Witcher: Sirens of the Deep	Barkeep, Herald	Voice

=== Television ===
==== Live-action performances ====
Year	Title	Role	Notes
1984–1986	The Edison Twins	Sgt. Paganee	13 episodes
1988	227	Jonathan Forsythe	Episode: "The Butler Did It"
1991	Married... with Children	Chef	Episode: "Look Who's Barking"
1991–1998	Seinfeld	Babu Bhatt	3 episodes
1992	Quantum Leap	Ben	Episode: "Moments to Live"
1992–1993	Coach	Rami	3 episodes
1993	Northern Exposure	Arthur Prabnanda	Episode: "The Jaws of Life"
1993	The Nanny	Butler Inspector #2	Episode: "The Butler, the Husband, the Wife and Her Mother"
1994	Melrose Place	Client	Episode: "Love, Mancini Style"
1994	Blossom	Shakir	Episode: "Oh, Baby"
1994	Step by Step	Dean of Admission	Episode: "My Bodyguard"
1994–1996	Weird Science	Mr. Palate	6 episodes
1995	Ellen	Ranjit	2 episodes
1997	Lois & Clark: The New Adventures of Superman	Misha	Episode: "The Family Hour"
1997	Caroline in the City	Mr. Tedescu	
1997	Star Trek: Deep Space Nine	Richard Bashir	Episode: "Doctor Bashir, I Presume?"
1997	Boy Meets World	Eduardo	Episode: "Chasing Angela"
1999	JAG	The Director	Episode: "War Stories"
2000	The X-Files	Project Doctor	Episode: "The Sixth Extinction II: Amor Fati"
2000	Star Trek: Voyager	Ambassador O'Zaal	Episode: "Drive"
2001	The Chris Isaak Show	Ramu Banerjee	2001 Mysterious Ways
2003, 2006	That's So Raven	Dr. Sleevemore	2 episodes
2005	Two and a Half Men	TV Narrator	Episode: "Those Big Pink Things with Coconut"
2006	One Tree Hill	Dauod	Episode: "All Tomorrow's Parties"
2007	NCIS	Ameen Temani	Episode: "Trojan Horse"
2007	The 4400	Claudio Borghi	Episode: "The Starzi Mutation"
2007–2019	The Big Bang Theory	V.M. Koothrappali	Recurring role
2008	Numb3rs	Sanjay Ramanujan	Episode: "Pay to Play"
2008–2013	The Secret Life of the American Teenager	Dr. Shakur	14 episodes
2010	Grey's Anatomy	Emile Flores	Episode: "Valentine's Day Massacre"
2010	The Mentalist	Professor	Episode: "Code Red"
2012	Burning Love	Titi's Dad	
2012	NCIS: Los Angeles	Indian Restaurant Manager	Episode: "Skip Deep"
2013	Once Upon a Time in Wonderland	Old Prisoner/Sultan	10 episodes
2013	Dog with a Blog	Monty Cathcart	Episode: "A New Baby?"
2015	Elementary	Santhosh	2 episodes
2015–2017, 2022	The Expanse	Arjun Avasarala	Michael Benyaer recast for the role in 2019; reprised the role in a voice cameo in a 2022 episode
2017	The Orville	Dr. Aronov	Episode: "Old Wounds"
2017	New Girl	Uncle Naseer	Episode: "The Hike"
2017	Prison Break	Judge	Episode: "The Prisoner's Dilemma"
2018	The Resident	Tejan Pravesh	4 episodes
2018	Raven's Home	Dr. Sleevemore	3 episodes
2018	I Feel Bad	Sonny Kamala	Main role
2022	The Really Loud House	Dr. Simmons	2 episodes
2025–2026	Deli Boys	Ahmad	Main role

==== Voice performances ====
Year	Title	Role	Notes
1986	MASK	Ali Bombay, Lester Sludge	8 episodes
1986	Dennis the Menace	Various	
1987	Lady Lovely Locks and the Pixietails	Shinning Glory, Pixieshine, Hairball	Various
1991	Darkwing Duck	Talking Guitar	Episode: "A Revolution in Home Appliances"
1992	Batman: The Animated Series	Jazzman	Episode: "I Am the Night"
1992–1993	Super Dave	Additional Voices	Unknown
1993–1995	The Pink Panther	Pugg	6 episodes
1995–1996	Freakazoid!	Mr. Snarzetti, Warden Riba, Doctor	3 episodes
1996	Superman: The Animated Series	Kryptonian Councilman, Eugene	2 episodes
1996	Saban's Adventures of Oliver Twist	Fagin, Narrator	Credited as Bob MacGarva
1996	Pinky and the Brain	Sir Niles, Drake, Critic #1	3 episodes
1996	Road Rovers	Lieutenant Skeam	Episode: "Where Rovers Dare"
1996–2002	The Sylvester & Tweety Mysteries	Masocks Mashoes, Commissar Lanuk, Diesel, Farmer, Conductor, Tour Guide, Immigration Agent	
1998	Walter Melon	Walter Melon	Main role; credited as Richard Bell
1999–2001	Batman Beyond	Samir, Police Lieutenant, Jace, Dr. Pandu Banjahri	4 episodes
1999–2001	Mike, Lu & Og	Haggis Cuzzlewit, Pirate Captain	5 episodes
2000–2001	Bob and Margaret	Bob Fish	Seasons 3 and 4
2001–2004	Lloyd in Space	Station	23 episodes
2001–2004	Justice League	Parasite, President	3 episodes
2002–2007	Kim Possible	Duff Killigan	14 episodes
2002	Samurai Jack	Brotok	Episode: "Jack and the Spartans"
2002–2003	Fillmore!	Librarium Lendrum	3 episodes
2003	Kim Possible: A Sitch in Time	Duff Killigan	Television film
2006–2007	Avatar: The Last Airbender	Guru Pathik	4 episodes
2007	Maya and Miguel	Dr. DasGupta	Episode: "Paging Dr. Maya"
2008–2009	The Spectacular Spider-Man	Aaron Warren, Miles Warren	7 episodes
2008–2014	Star Wars: The Clone Wars	King Katuunko, Ki-Adi-Mundi	
2009–2011	The Penguins of Madagascar	Zoo Doctor	5 episodes
2009	The Secret Saturdays	Grosshomme	Episode: "The Return of Tsul'Kalu"
2010	Phineas and Ferb	Uncle Sabu	2 episodes
2010	Handy Manny	Mr. Kumar	
2011–2013	Green Lantern: The Animated Series	Appa Ali Apsa, Brother Warth, LANOS	13 episodes
2014	Shazam!	Tawky Tawny, Solomon	2 episodes
2013–2014	Beware the Batman	Professor Pyg, Liam Taylor	4 episodes
2015	Guardians of the Galaxy	Pyko	Episode: "We Are Family"
2016	Steven Universe	Mr. Frowney	Episode: "Future Boy Zoltron"
2016–2017	Pickle and Peanut	Pickle's Father, additional voices	4 episodes
2018, 2022	SpongeBob SquarePants	Coupe, Guru	2 episodes
2018	Big City Greens	Doctor	Episode: "Cricketsitter"
2019	Pup Academy	D.O.G.	3 episodes
2019	Carmen Sandiego	Ibrahim Al Sibaq	Episode: "The Need for Speed Caper"
2020–2021	The Simpsons	Pubgoers, Londoners	2 episodes
2022	Star Wars: Tales of the Jedi	Ki-Adi-Mundi	Episode: "Choices"
2023	Kamp Koral: SpongeBob's Under Years	Sal	Episode: "Are You Smarter Than a Smart Cabin?"
2023	Unicorn: Warriors Eternal	Darvish	2 episodes

=== Video games ===
Year	Title	Role	Notes
1998	Baldur's Gate	Belt, Coran, Oublek	
2000	Diablo II	Gheed, Drognan, Alkor	
2001	Fallout Tactics: Brotherhood of Steel	Ghoul Merchant Hieronymus, Chief Scientist DuBois, Tesla Robot, Service Robot	
2001	Return to Castle Wolfenstein	Egyptian No. 2, Prologue German No. 2 (PS2 version)	
2001	Tarzan: Untamed	Professor Porter	
2002	Superman: Shadow of Apokolips	Parasite, Male Scientist, Warden	
2002	Law & Order: Dead on the Money	Saheed Singh	
2003	Star Wars: Knights of the Old Republic	Master Zhar Lestin, Mysterious Man, Eli Gand, Sith Interrogator, Czerka Officer	
2003	Command & Conquer: Generals Zero Hour	Rodall "Demo" Juhziz	General's Challenge
2003	Medal of Honor: Rising Sun	Pvt. Battersby, Sgt. Gupta	
2003	Armed & Dangerous	Roman	
2004	Fallout: Brotherhood of Steel	Ghoul Merchant, Chief Scientist, Tesla, Service Robot	
2004	Ground Control II: Operation Exodus	Centurion Cezarus	
2004	The Bard's Tale		
2004	EverQuest II	Garion Dunam, Scribe Varion Smitelin, Armsdealer Barrik	
2004	The Lord of the Rings: The Battle for Middle-earth	King Théoden	
2005	Medal of Honor: European Assault	Additional voices	
2005	Ultimate Spider-Man	Shocker, Adrian Toomes	
2005	Age of Empires III	Sahin; Stuart Black	
2005	True Crime: New York City		
2006	Kingdom Hearts II	Hector Barbossa	
2006	The Lord of the Rings: The Battle for Middle-earth II	King Théoden	
2006	Pirates of the Caribbean: The Legend of Jack Sparrow	Hector Barbossa, Fort Guard, Captured Pirate #5	
2006	Cars	Piston Cup Racers	
2006	The Lord of the Rings: The Battle for Middle-earth II: The Rise of the Witch-king	King Théoden	
2007	Pirates of the Caribbean: At World's End	Hector Barbossa	
2007	Age of Empires III: The Asian Dynasties	Colonel George Edwardson	
2007	Mass Effect	Rear Admiral Kahoku, Chairman Burns, Dr. Saleon, Dr. Wayne, Rogue Al, Samesh Bhatia, businessman, Elcor Diplomat, Refugee, Salarian Soldier, Turian Customer	
2007	Cars Mater-National Championship	Fillmore	
2009	The Lord of the Rings: Conquest	Théoden, Elven Officer No. 2, Old Male Hobbit	
2009	Night at the Museum: Battle of Smithsonian	Napoleon Bonaparte, Guard No. 2	
2009	Dragon Age: Origins	Knight-Commander Greagoir, Ser Otto, Bann Sighard, Blood Mage Leader, Howe Estate Guard, Howe Estate Craftsman	
2010	Command & Conquer 4: Tiberian Twilight	Additional voices	
2010	The Lord of the Rings: Aragorn's Quest	King Théoden, Barliman Butterbur	
2011	Dragon Age II	Larius – Legacy DLC	
2011	Star Wars: The Old Republic	Devotek, additional voices	
2012	Mass Effect 3	General Oleg Petrovsky – Omega DLC	
2012	Diablo III	Abd al-Hazir	
2012	Rush: A Disney–Pixar Adventure	Chef Skinner	
2013	Sly Cooper: Thieves in Time	Salim Al-Kupar, Panther, Tiger	
2013	Disney Infinity	Hector Barbossa	
2013	DuckTales Remastered	Flintheart Glomgold	
2014	Diablo III: Reaper of Souls	Abd al-Hazir	
2014	Disney Infinity: Marvel Super Heroes	Hector Barbossa	
2014	Skylanders: Trap Team	Bernie	
2014	Far Cry 4	Additional voices	
2014	Game of Thrones: A Telltale Games Series	Ser Royland Degore; Tazal	
2015	Disney Infinity 3.0	Hector Barbossa	
2016	World of Warcraft: Legion	Lord Jorach Ravenholdt	
2018	Lego DC Super-Villains	Ganthet	
2019	Kingdom Hearts III	Hector Barbossa	
2020	Marvel's Avengers	Yusuf Khan	
2022	Voodoo Detective	Benny	
2022	Tactics Ogre: Reborn	Duke Juda Ronway	
2024	Disney Speedstorm	Hector Barbossa	
