= Pom Poko =

1994 animated film directed by Isao Takahata

- Theatrical release poster

Japanese name
- Kanji: 平成狸合戦ぽんぽこ
Transcriptions
- Revised Hepburn: Heisei Tanuki Gassen Ponpoko
- Directed by: Isao Takahata
- Written by: Isao Takahata
- Produced by: Toshio Suzuki
- Starring: Kokontei Shinchō; Makoto Nonomura; Yuriko Ishida; Norihei Miki; Nijiko Kiyokawa; Shigeru Izumiya; Hayashiya Shōzō IX; Akira Fukuzawa; Gannosuke Ashiya; Beichō Katsura; Katsura Bunshi V; Kosan Yanagiya
- Cinematography: Atsushi Okui
- Edited by: Takeshi Seyama
- Music by: Shang Shang Typhoon
- Production company: Studio Ghibli
- Distributed by: Toho
- Release date: July 16, 1994
- Running time: 119 minutes
- Country: Japan
- Language: Japanese
- Box office: ¥4.47 billion (Japan)

Pom Poko (Note: Japanese: 平成狸合戦ぽんぽこ, Hepburn: Heisei Tanuki Gassen Ponpoko; lit. 'Heisei-era Raccoon Dog War Ponpoko') is a 1994 Japanese animated fantasy film written and directed by Isao Takahata, animated by Studio Ghibli for Tokuma Shoten, Nippon Television Network and Hakuhodo, and distributed by Toho.

The film centers around a colony of Japanese raccoon dogs living in the outskirts of Tokyo as they work to combat the growing deforestation of their home. Takahata's third film for Ghibli, Pom Poko was released on July 16, 1994, to critical and commercial success. The film was Japan's submission to the 67th Academy Awards for the Academy Award for Best Foreign Language Film, but was not accepted as a nominee. Studio Ghibli began experimenting with computer-generated imagery during the film's production.

== Background ==
The story features tanuki, or Japanese raccoon dogs (incorrectly referred to as "raccoons" in the English dialog). In Japanese folklore, tanuki are considered to be bake-danuki (化け狸), magical creatures capable of shapeshifting into people or other objects. They are a highly sociable, mischievous species, too fun-loving and fond of tasty treats to be a real threat – unlike kitsune (fox spirits) and other bake-danuki shapeshifters.

The phrase "Pom Poko" in the title refers to the sound of tanuki drumming their bellies, from a 1919 poem by Ujō Noguchi which became a popular children's song when it was set to music in 1925.

Shigeru Sugiura, Hisashi Inoue and Shigeru Mizuki were credited as additional crews, as designs of tanuki and various yokai and parts of the plot were based on their works. A character based on Mizuki also appeared as the commentator in the film.

== Plot ==
The story begins in late 1960s Japan. A group of tanuki are threatened by a giant suburban development project called New Tama, in the Tama Hills on the outskirts of Tokyo. The development is cutting into their forest habitat and dividing their land. The story resumes in early 1990s Japan, during the first few years of the Heisei era. With limited living space and food decreasing every year, the tanuki begin fighting among themselves for the diminishing resources, but at the urging of the matriarch Oroku, they decide to unify to stop the development.

Several tanuki lead the resistance, including the aggressive chief Gonta, the old guru Seizaemon, the wise-woman Oroku, and the young and resourceful Shoukichi. Using their illusion skills (which they must re-learn after having forgotten them), they stage a number of diversions including industrial sabotage. These attacks injure and even kill people, scaring construction workers into quitting, but more workers immediately replace them. In desperation, the tanuki send out messengers to seek help from various legendary elders from other regions.

After several years, one of the messengers returns bringing a trio of elders from the distant island of Shikoku, where development is not a problem and the tanuki are still worshipped. In an effort at re-establishing respect for the supernatural, the group stages a massive ghost parade to make the humans think the town is haunted. The strain of the massive illusion kills one of the elders and his spirit is lifted up in a raigō, and the effort seems wasted when the owner of a nearby theme park takes credit for the parade, claiming it was a publicity stunt.

With this setback, the unity of the tanuki finally fails and they break up into smaller groups, each following a different strategy. One group led by Gonta takes the route of eco-terrorism, holding off workers until they are wiped out in a pitched battle with the police, and finally, fused into the form of a tsurube-otoshi, killed while blocking the path of an oncoming dekotora. Another group desperately attempts to gain media attention through television appearances to plead their case against the habitat's destruction. One of the elders becomes senile and starts a Buddhist dancing cult among the tanuki who are unable to transform, eventually sailing away with them in a ship that takes them to their deaths. The other elder investigates joining the human world as the last of the transforming kitsune (foxes) have already done.

When all else fails, in a last act of defiance, the remaining tanuki stage a grand illusion, temporarily transforming the urbanized land back into its pristine state to remind everyone of what has been lost. Finally, with their strength exhausted, the tanuki most trained in illusion follow the example of the kitsune: they blend into human society one by one, abandoning those who cannot transform. While the media appeal comes too late to stop the construction, the public responds sympathetically to the tanuki, pushing the developers to set aside some areas as parks. However, the parks are too small to accommodate all the non-transforming tanuki. Some try to survive there, dodging traffic to rummage through human scraps for food, while others disperse further out to the countryside to compete with the tanuki who are already there.

One day, Shoukichi, who also joined the human world, is coming home from work when he sees a non-transformed tanuki leaping into a gap in a wall. Shoukichi crawls into the gap and follows the path, which leads to a grassy clearing where some of his former companions are gathering. He joyfully transforms back into a tanuki to join them. Shoukichi's friend, Ponkichi, addresses the viewer, asking humans to be more considerate of tanuki and other animals less endowed with transformation skills, and not to destroy their living space. As the view pulls out and away, their surroundings are revealed as a golf course within a suburban sprawl.

== Voice cast ==
Character name	Japanese voice actor	English voice actor
Shoukichi (正吉)	Makoto Nonomura	Jonathan Taylor Thomas
Gonta (権太)	Shigeru Izumiya	Clancy Brown
Oroku (おろく婆, Oroku-baba)	Nijiko Kiyokawa	Tress MacNeille
Tsurukame Oshō (鶴亀 和尚)	Kosan Yanagiya	Andre Stojka
Seizaemon (青左衛門)	Norihei Miki	J. K. Simmons
Ponkichi (ぽん吉)	Hayashiya Shōzō IX	David Oliver Cohen
Tamasaburo (玉三郎)	Akira Kamiya	Wally Kurth
Bunta (文太)	Takehiro Murata	Kevin Michael Richardson
Sasuke (佐助)	Megumi Hayashibara	Marc Donato
Ryutaro (竜太郎)	Akira Fukuzawa	John DiMaggio
Okiyo (おキヨ)	Yuriko Ishida	Jillian Bowen
Kinchō Daimyōjin VI	Beichō Katsura	Brian George
Yashimano Hage	Katsura Bunshi V	Brian George
Inugami Gyōbu	Gannosuke Ashiya	Jess Harnell
Otama (お玉)	Yorie Yamashita	Russi Taylor
Hayashi (林)	Osamu Katō	Brian Posehn
Koharu (小春)	Yumi Kuroda	Olivia d'Abo
Narrator (語り, Katari)	Kokontei Shinchō	Maurice LaMarche
Reporter (アナウンサー, Anaunsā)	Makiko Ishikawa; Masanobu Iwakuma; Toshimi Ashizawa; Minako Nagai; Masahiro Hosaka; Katsuhiro Masukata	Mark Moseley
News Anchor (キャスター, Kyasutā)	Sawako Agawa; Naruhito Iguchi	Mark Moseley

Additional voices in the English dub include Newell Alexander, Jeff Bennett, Mitch Carter, Holly Dorff, Zac Gardner, Sherry Hursey, Jordan Orr, Philece Sampler, Alyson Stoner, Erica Beck, Reeve Carney, David Cowgill, Ike Eisenmann, Richard Steven Horvitz, Hope Levy, Mary Mouser, Peter Renaday, Audrey Wasilewski, and Adam Wylie.

== Release ==
The film was released in Japan on July 16, 1994. It was released on DVD on August 16, 2005, in North America by Walt Disney Studios Home Entertainment along with My Neighbors the Yamadas. Optimum Releasing released the film on DVD in the United Kingdom, a year later. Disney released a Blu-ray disc on February 3, 2015. GKIDS re-issued the film on Blu-ray and DVD on February 6, 2018, under a new deal with Studio Ghibli.

== Reception ==
=== Box office ===
Pom Poko was the number one Japanese film on the domestic market in 1994, earning ¥2.63 billion in distribution income, and grossing ¥4.47 billion in total box office revenue.

=== Critical response ===
Pom Poko has an approval rating of 86% on review aggregator website Rotten Tomatoes, based on 14 reviews, and an average rating of 6/10. Metacritic assigned the film a weighted average score of 77 out of 100, based on 8 critics, indicating "generally favorable reviews".

=== Awards and nominations ===
It was chosen as the Japanese submission for the Academy Award for Best Foreign Language Film for that year. It won Best Animation Film at the 49th Mainichi Film Awards. It won the Grand Prix in the feature film category at the Annecy International Animation Film Festival in 1995.

== See also ==
- Cinema of Japan
- List of submissions to the 67th Academy Awards for Best Foreign Language Film
- List of Japanese submissions for the Academy Award for Best Foreign Language Film
