= Bake-danuki =

Yokai

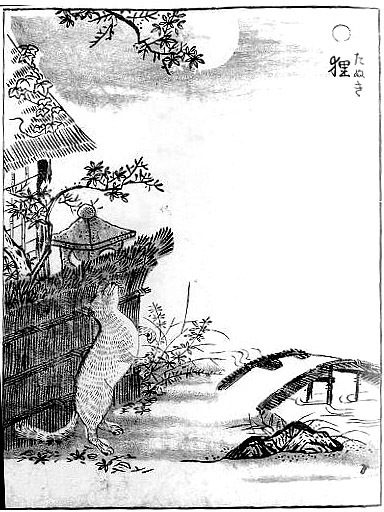
"Tanuki" from Gazu Hyakki Yagyo by Sekien Toriyama

Bake-danuki (化け狸) are a kind of yōkai (supernatural beings) found in the classics and in the folklore and legends of various places in Japan, commonly associated with the Japanese raccoon dog or tanuki.

Although the tanuki is a real, extant animal, the bake-danuki that appears in literature has always been depicted as a strange, even supernatural animal. In some regions of Japan, bake-danuki are reputed to have abilities similar to those attributed to kitsune (foxes): they can shapeshift into other things or people, and can possess human beings.

Many legends of tanuki exist in the Sado Islands of Niigata Prefecture and in Shikoku, and among them, like the Danzaburou-danuki of Sado, the Kinchō-tanuki and Rokuemon-tanuki of Awa Province (Tokushima Prefecture), and the Yashima no Hage-tanuki of Kagawa Prefecture, the tanuki that possessed special abilities were given names, and even became the subject of rituals. Apart from these places, tanuki are treated with special regard in a few cases.

== History ==
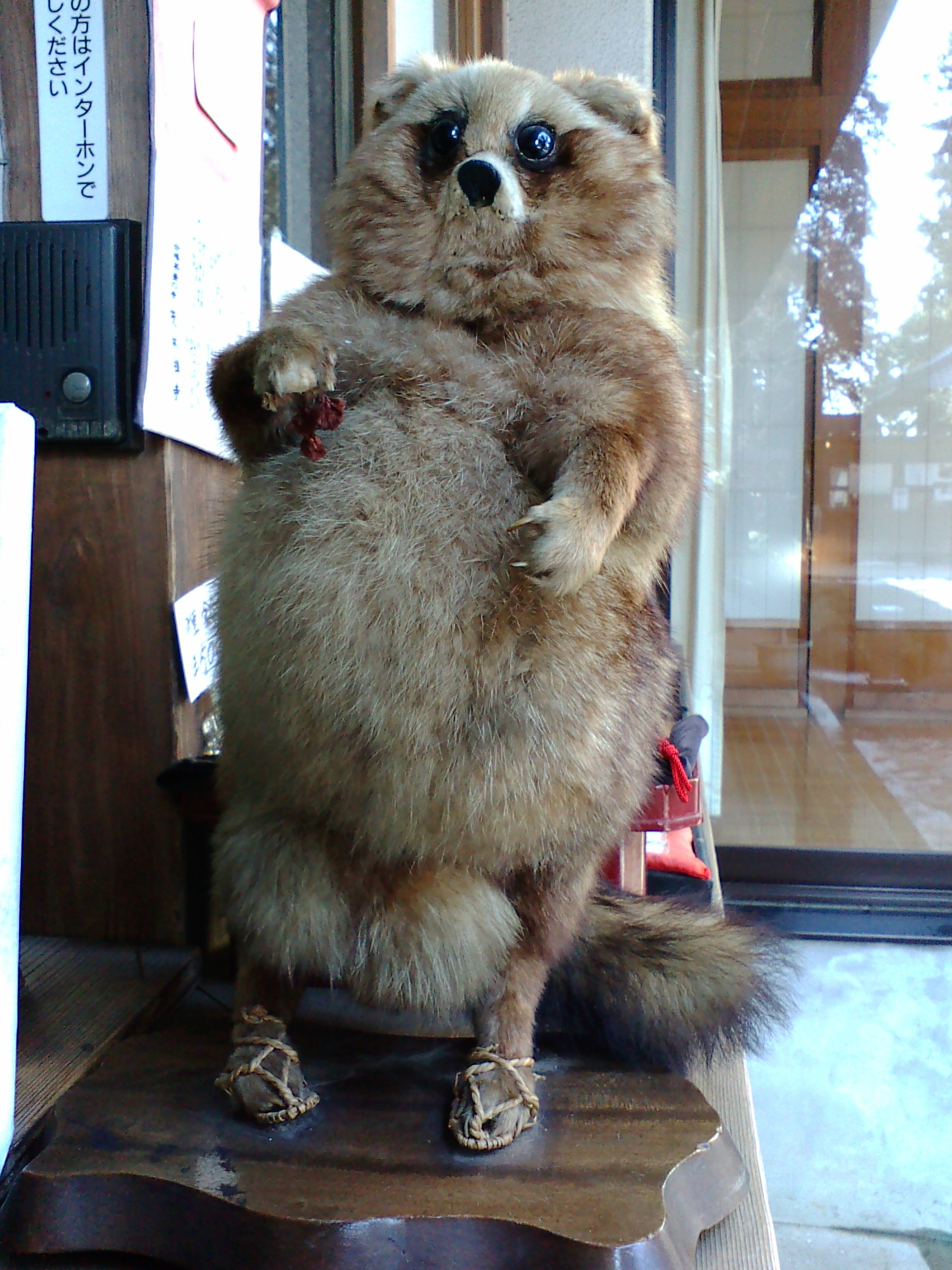
Taxidermy of a Japanese raccoon dog, wearing waraji on its feet: This tanuki is displayed in a Buddhist temple in Japan, in the area of the folktale "Bunbuku Chagama".

The earliest appearance of the bake-danuki in literature, in the chapter about Empress Suiko in the Nihon Shoki, written during the Nara period, is the passages "in two months of spring, there are tanuki in the country of Mutsu (春二月陸奥有狢), they turn into humans and sing songs (化人以歌)." Bake-danuki subsequently appear in such classics as the Nihon Ryōiki and the Uji Shūi Monogatari.

The Chinese character "狸", pronounced lí in modern Mandarin, was originally a collective name for medium-sized mammals resembling cats in China, with the leopard cat as its nucleus. When this character was brought to Japan, it could not be suitably applied to any animals. Japanese intellectuals used the character to signify tanuki, stray cats, wild boars, Japanese badger, weasels, and Japanese giant flying squirrels. However, since Japanese tanuki do not have the fearsome image that the leopard cats of China do, unlike in China, their image is that of a more comical type of monster.

== Traits ==
In folktales like "Kachi-kachi Yama", and "Bunbuku Chagama", they often played the part of foolish animals. Compared with kitsune (fox), which are the epitome of shape-changing animals, one saying is "the fox has seven disguises, the tanuki has eight (狐七化け、狸八化け)". The tanuki is thus superior to the fox in its disguises, but unlike the fox, which changes its form for the sake of tempting people, tanuki do so to fool people and make them seem stupid. Also, a theory is told that they simply like to change their form. The animal name mujina (貉) also sometimes meant the Japanese raccoon dog, with overlapping folklore.

The comical image of the tanuki having a large scrotum is thought to have developed in Kanazawa, likely during the Edo Period, where goldsmiths would use tanuki pelts for the process of hammering gold nuggets into leaf. Tanuki may be shown with their testicles flung over their backs like travelers' packs, or using them as drums.

Tanuki are also said to drum on their bellies, making sounds such as "pom poko" or "ponpon", and typically depicted as having large bellies. Tanuki may or may not be the cause of mysterious drumming sounds tanuki-bayashi.

== Bake-danuki by area ==
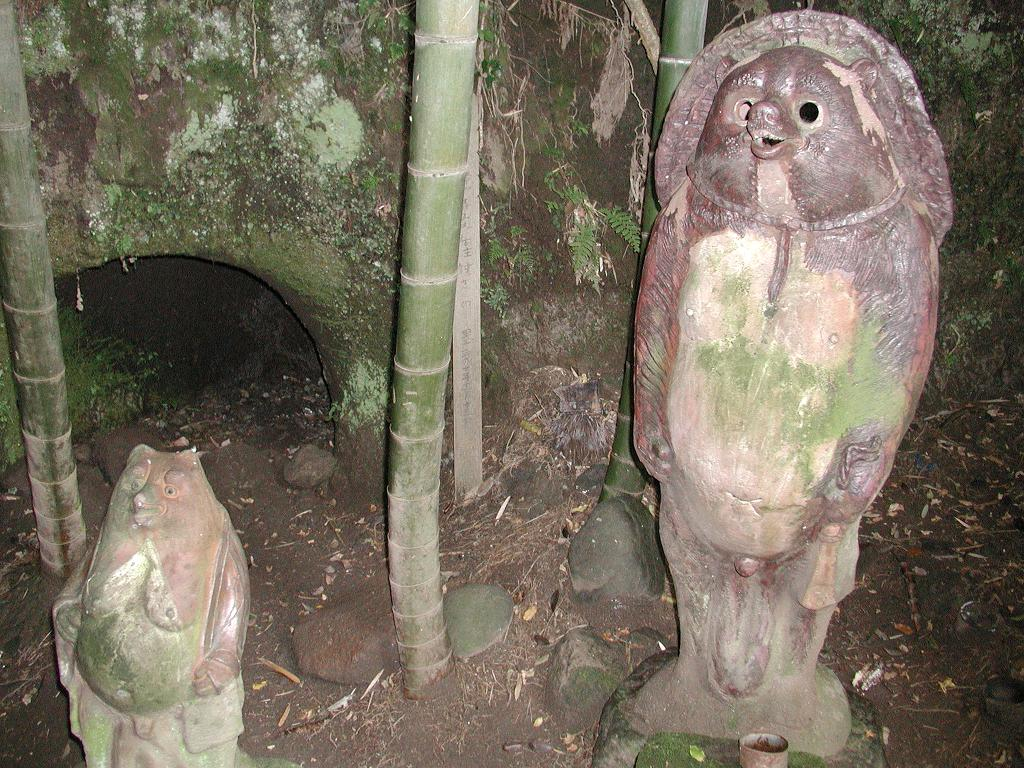
Tanuki statues at a temple in Kamakura, Kanagawa, Japan

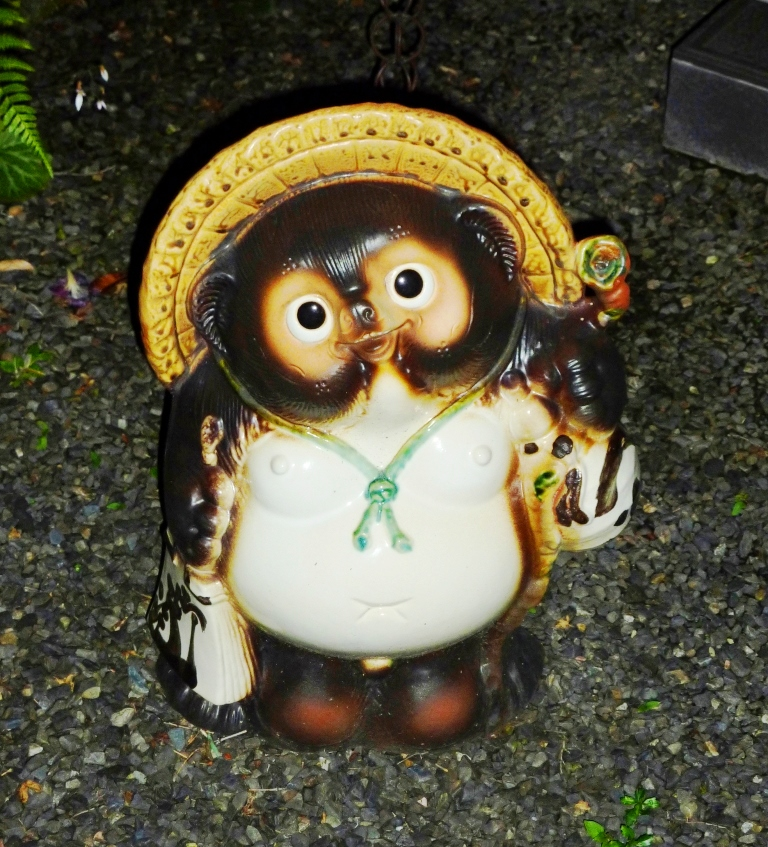
Tanuki or raccoon dog statue. Banna-ji. Ashikaga, Tochigi.

Stories of bake-danuki are told in each area of Japan, especially in Shikoku, and whenever mysterious events occur, it would be the work of a tanuki. There are also ones known internationally like the Inugami Gyoubu and his 808 followers of his household.

Three famous tanuki of Japan
Danzaburou-danuki (Sado island, Niigata Prefecture), Shibaemon-tanuki (Awaji Island, Hyōgo Prefecture), Yashima no Hage-tanuki (Yashima, Kagawa Prefecture)
Bunbuku Chagama (文福茶釜; lit. "Bunbuku tea-kettle")
In the folklore of the Morin-ji, in Tatebayashi, Gunma Prefecture, a tanuki was disguised as a teapot belonging to a monk named Shukaku, and boiled tea that would never run out no matter how much one draws from it. In the Morinji no Kama from Konjaku Hyakki Shūi by Toriyama Sekien, it was named "Bunbuku" from the expression "Bunbukuka" (文武火), meaning "literary and military fire", where the literary fire means the fire for reading by, and the military fire means destructive fire.
Sōko-tanuki (宗固狸; lit. "religion adherence tanuki")
In the Gugyō-ji in Iinuma, Ibaraki Prefecture, there is a grave for this tanuki. It disguised as a monk for the temple, but one day, it took a nap and showed its true form. However, it was said that due to working there for a long time, this tanuki was then made a page.
Tanuki-bayashi (狸囃子; lit. "tanuki rhythm")
In Edo, as one of the seven mysteries of the town, there were sounds of a drum that come from nowhere that can be heard in the middle of the night that were called "tanuki-bayashi". It was the basis for the nursery rhyme, Shōjō-ji no Tanuki-bayashi, passed down at Shōjō-ji.
Fukurosage (袋下げ; lit. "dangling bag")
Oomachi town, Kitaazumi District, Nagano Prefecture (now Ōmachi city). It was a tanuki who climbed a large tree, caught the attention of passersby, and dangled white bags.
Owarezaka (負われ坂; lit. "carry me hill")
Minamikawachi District, Osaka Prefecture. Upon passing by a certain hill during the night, there would be a voice saying "will you carry me on your back, will you carry me (oware yo ka, oware yo ka)," and when a brave man replied "should I bear, should I bear (outaro ka, outaro ka)," a huge pine log fell on his back. When he returned home to chop it with a hatchet, an old tanuki revealed its true form and apologized.
Jūbakobaba (重箱婆; lit. "jūbako old woman")
Tamana District, Kumamoto Prefecture and Hyūga, Miyazaki Prefecture. It is said that the old tanuki would disguise itself as an old woman with a jūbako in her hand. In Kumamoto, the jūbakobaba would furthermore, while saying "as a jūbakobaba (old woman with a jūbako), do you need a treat or not," deceive people with a rock-like object.
Fūri (風狸; lit "wind beast")
The fūri can be seen in the Gazu Hyakki Yagyō, the Wakan Sansai Zue, and the Bencao Gangmu, with statements like "like wind among rocks, it climbs trees, and has a swiftness like flying birds." It is said that by looking for a particular kind of grass and holding it out to a bird, it can serve as bait.
Akadenchū (赤殿中; lit. "red vest")
Horie village, Itano District, Tokushima Prefecture (now Naruto). In the middle of night, it would disguise itself as a child in a red denchū (a sleeveless hanten), who insistently begs to be carried on one's back. Since it seems pleasant even when one carries it on one's back, it would beat on that person's shoulders.
Kasasashi-tanuki (傘差し狸; lit. "tanuki carrying an umbrella")
Ikeda, Miyoshi District, Tokushima Prefecture (now Miyoshi). During times like rainy evenings, it would disguise itself as a person and invite people to shelter under its umbrella. When a person who doesn't have an umbrella goes under it, it is said that they'd be taken to an unbelievably out-there place.
Kubitsuri-tanuki (首吊り狸; lit. "neck-hanging tanuki")
Yutani, Hashikura, Miyoshi District, Tokushima Prefecture (now Miyoshi). It is said to lure people and cause them to be hanged by the neck.
Kozō-tanuki (小僧狸; lit. "young priest tanuki")
Gakushima, Oe District, Tokushima Prefecture (now Yoshinogawa). It would disguise itself as a young priest and stand in the way of passersby, and if one gets angry and cuts it with a sword, it would multiply in numbers all night long.
Bōzu-tanuki (坊主狸; lit. "shaven-head tanuki")
Handa, Mima District, Tokushima Prefecture (now Tsurugi). When people cross a bridge named "Bōzu Bridge", before they know it, they would find their hair shaven.
Shirodokkuri (白徳利; lit. "white wine bottle")
Hyūgadani Muyachō Kokuwajima, Naruto, Tokushima, Tokushima Prefecture. This tanuki would disguise itself as a white wine bottle, but when people try to pick it up, it would roll around making it impossible for people to catch it.
Usagi-tanuki (兎狸; lit. "rabbit tanuki")
Tokushima Prefecture. On the small hill of Takaoka along the Yoshino River, it would disguise itself as a rabbit and run at ease, and when people find it and think of it as a suitable catch, they would end up running around Takaoka hill several times.
Uchiwata-danuki (打綿狸; lit. "strike cotton tanuki")
Kagawa Prefecture. It would transform its appearance into a piece of cotton and roll along the roadside, but when people try to pick it up, it would start to move and rise to the sky.

== Ongoing popular tradition ==
=== In artisanry ===
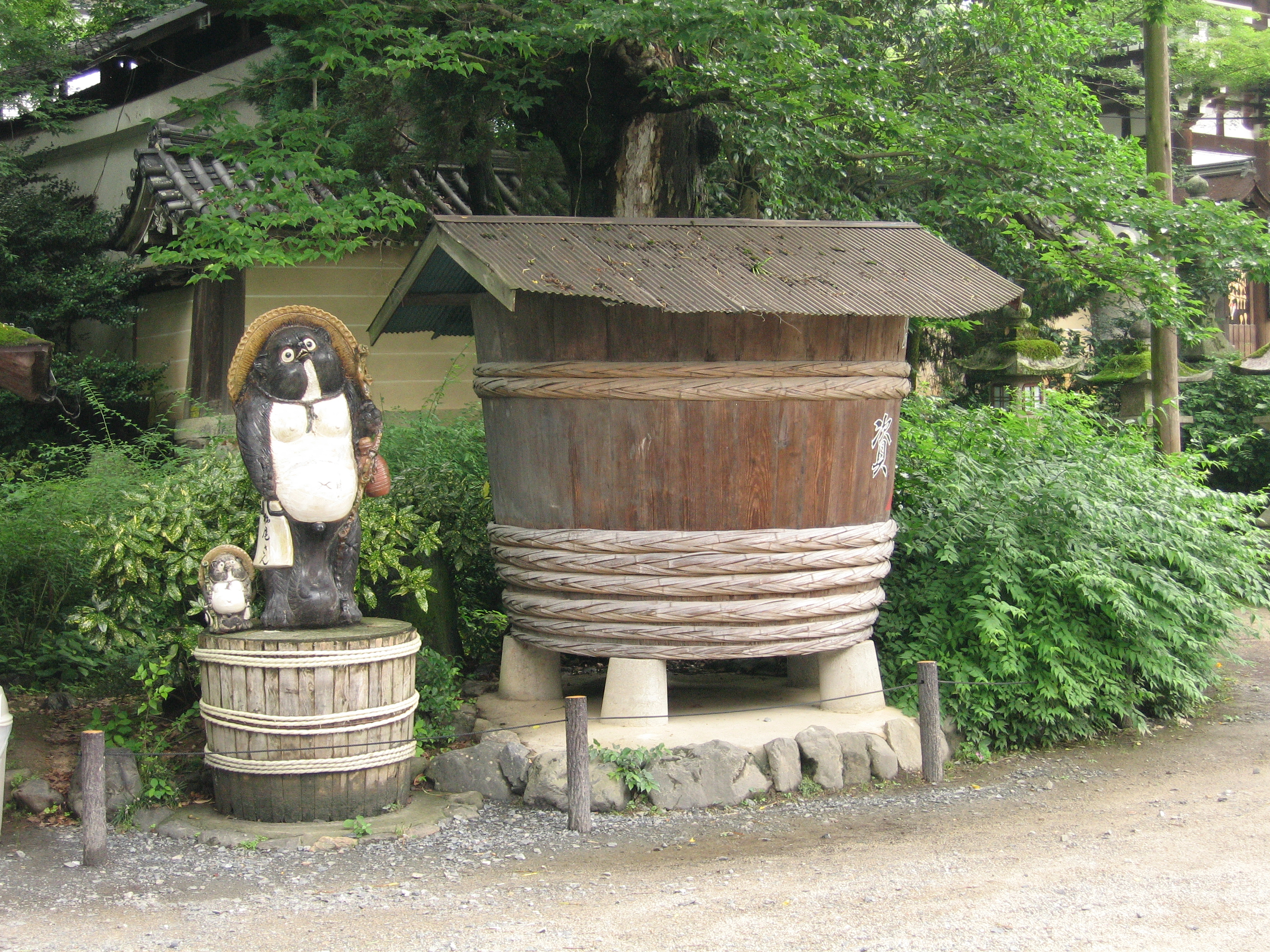
Tanuki next to a shrine

The statues seen all over Japan of the tanuki are Shigaraki ware, a style of pottery long associated with tanuki imagery. According to Alice Gordenker, the modern version of the tanuki was developed by a potter named Tetsuzo Fujiwara, who moved to Shiga Prefecture in 1936 and whose pottery was admired even by the emperor.

The popular figurine of the tanuki is associated with eight special traits that bring good fortune, invented in 1952 by a Buddhist monk. These are:

- a hat to be ready to protect against trouble or bad weather;
- big eyes to perceive the environment and help make good decisions;
- a sake bottle that represents virtue;
- a big tail that provides steadiness and strength until success is achieved;
- an oversized scrotum that symbolizes financial luck;
- a promissory note that represents trust or confidence;
- a big belly that symbolizes bold and calm decisiveness; and
- a friendly smile.

=== In verse ===
A common schoolyard song in Japan makes explicit reference to the tanuki's testicles:

Japanese:

Tan-tan-tanuki no kintama wa,
Kaze mo nai no ni,
Bu-ra bura

English translation:

Tan-tan-tanuki's bollocks,
Even without wind,
They swiiing-swing!

to the melody of Shall We Gather at the River?. It continues for several verses, with many regional variations.

=== In film ===
The plot of the 1994 animated film Pom Poko features ''bake-danuki including their shape-shifting abilities.
