= Naruhito (given name) =

- Gender: Male

Origin
- Origin: Japanese
- Meaning: Different meanings depending on the kanji used

Naruhito is a masculine Japanese given name. Notable people with the name include:

- Naruhito (徳仁; born 1960), 126th and current Emperor of Japan
- Prince Kan'in Naruhito (閑院宮 愛仁親王; 1818–1842), head of the imperial Kanin-no-miya household
- Naruhito Iguchi (井口 成人; born 1951), Japanese actor and voice actor
