= Tanuki-bayashi =

Sound phenomenon in Japanese legends

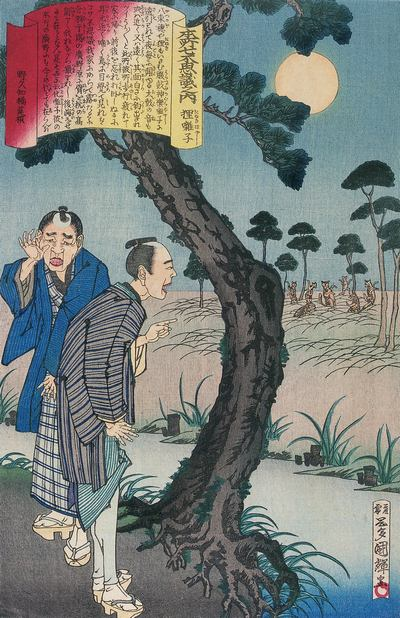
"Tanuki-bayashi", from the Seven Wonders of Honjo. Painting by Utagawa Kuniteru III

Tanuki-bayashi (狸囃子) are strange sonic phenomena, described in legends from all over Japan. They manifest as musical sounds, heard in the middle of the night and resembling those of flutes or drums, yet having no discernible source.

== Outline ==
In the Edo period, in Honjo, Sumida, Tokyo, they are also called baka-bayashi (馬鹿囃子) and as a ghost story that takes place in Honjo, they are counted as one of the Seven Mysteries of Honjo. When one thinks that one has heard the sound of an orchestra, even if one tries to walk towards where the sound is coming from, the sound goes further away as if it were trying to flee, so that it would be impossible to know the source of the sound. If dawn comes while one is following the sound, it is said that one would notice that one is in a place one has never seen before. Matsura Seizan, the lord of the Hirado Domain, also encountered this strange phenomenon and ordered people to find the source of the sound, but the sound disappeared near Warigesui, so that it was not possible to continue following it. Just like its name, it is said to be the work of a tanuki and searches for tanuki were also conducted around locations where the sound was heard, but no traces of tanuki were able to be found either.

There are also legends of tanuki-bayashi in the Shōjō-ji in Kisarazu, Chiba Prefecture, and like the Bunbuku Chagama and the Tale of the Eight Hundred and Eight Tanuki, it is also counted as one of the "big three tanuki legends of Japan" and is also well known as a nursery rhyme. The tale is called the Shōjō-ji no Tanuki-bayashi.

In Sumida, Tokyo, near to Koume and Terashima, there was a farming area around that time, and because of that, the sounds from the autumn festival, a harvesting ritual, rode the wind, overlapped with each other and became a strange rhythm and timbre, and it was also thought that the winds would allow the sounds of shamisen and drums from around Yanagibashi to be heard from afar.

== In popular culture ==
The 1994 anime Pom Poko (平成狸合戦ぽんぽこ) directed by Isao Takahata, animated by Studio Ghibli, features tanuki and their bayashi. The song the tanuki play as they carry one of their number, Gonta Takagemori, to the temple is adapted from the song "Shojoji no Tanuki Bayashi".
