= Danzaburou-danuki =

Bake-danuki passed down in stories on Sado Island

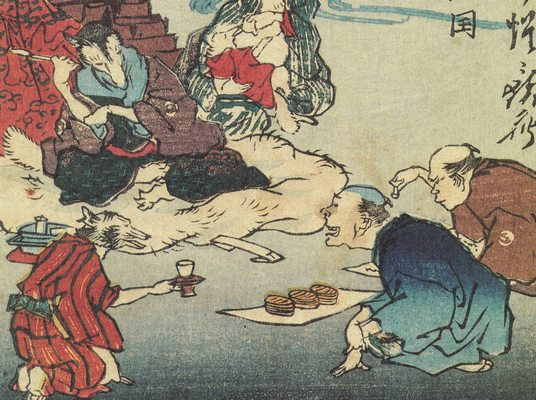
Danzaburou-danuki (upper left) lends money to human merchants in the painting Danzaburou-danuki of Sado Province (佐渡国同三狸) by Kawanabe Kyōsai; from the book 100 Images by Kyōsai.。

Danzaburou-danuki (団三郎狸, Danzaburō-danuki) is a bake-danuki passed down in stories on Sado Island, particularly in Aikawa and Niigata. In Sado, tanuki were called "mujina (狢)", thus he was also referred to as Danzaburou-mujina (団三郎狢). In the Ukiyo-e, its name was written as 同三狸." Together with the Shibaemon-tanuki of Awaji Island, and the Yashima no Hage-tanuki of Kagawa Prefecture, they form the "three famous tanuki" of Japan.

== Legend ==
The supreme commander of the tanuki on Sado Island, most tales of Danzaburou focus on his trickery of humans. He would create wall-like structures to block people's paths at night, fooled people with mirages and sold leaves from trees by making them look as if they were made of gold. He also created mirages to lure people into his lair (said to be a hole in the ground or a cellar), making it appear as a splendid estate. If he ever became ill, Danzaburou would disguise himself as a human and visit human doctors for treatment.

His reputation was not all bad, however. He was said to have often lent money to people struggling with financial troubles, though said funds were in all likelihood obtained by him fooling people into working for him, or otherwise embezzled. Some tales actually purport that Danzaburou would repay what he stole; a story from the town of Orito (near Aikawa), reported that the tanuki left a sealed promissory note with the victim's name, the sum of money taken and the date it was to be returned. When the day came, the victim found the note had disappeared and the payment was left in its place. Afterwards, Danzaburou was deified in Aikawa as Futatsuiwa Daimyoujin (二つ岩大明神), into which people heartily put their faith.

It has been said that the reason why there are no kitsune (foxes) in Sado is that Danzaburou drove them out, detailed in two legends:

- While Danzaburou was on a journey, he met a kitsune and was requested to "Bring me to Sado." Danzaburou replied, "I'll bring you there, but it'll be difficult if you look like that. Please shapeshift into my zōri." The kitsune thus shapeshifted into a zōri, and wearing that, Danzaburou rode on a boat. Before long, Danzaburou rode on a ship to Sado, and right in the middle of the sea, he took off his zōri and tossed them into the sea. Ever since, kitsune have never considered trying to cross over to Sado again.
- While Danzaburou was on a journey, he met one kitsune. As opposed to the kitsune who boasted of his techniques, Danzaburou said, "I'm good at disguising myself as the daimyo's procession, so I'll threaten you," and disappeared. Soon after that, the daimyo's procession arrived. The kitsune jumped under a basket of a feudal lord within the procession, and mocked, "You surely disguised yourself well," as the kitsune was seized at once and put to the sword for the crime of causing a disturbance. The procession was not Danzaburou, but the real thing, and he knew beforehand that the procession was about to pass by.

There are several more tales of Danzaburou's antics, but also a legend that he once lost to a man in a battle of wits, and ceased tricking humans.

- Danzaburou found a young peasant, and to trick him, he disguised himself as a young woman and pretended to be in a poor state of health. The young peasant called out, and Danzaburou replied, "I can't move because of my stomachache." The peasant thus took responsibility for sending the woman, but he somehow had a hunch that it was Danzaburou, and tied the woman up with rope. The peasant answered to the startled Danzaburou, "It's so you won't slide off." Danzaburou, feeling a sense of danger, desperately pleaded, "Let me off." The peasant asked "Even though you're in bad health, why do you want to get off?" and did not let Danzaburou off, and Danzaburou replied "... I want to go pee," but the peasant laughed, "If a beautiful girl like you will pee, I want to see it. Do it on my back," and did not let Danzaburou off at all. Before long, they arrived at what was the peasant's house. Danzaburou said, "Isn't this my home?" and the peasant said, "Danzaburou, I know who you actually are!" and harshly chastised the earnestly apologizing Danzaburou. Ever since, Danzaburou did not try fooling humans again.

== Possible origin ==
In Meireki 3 (AD 1657), tanuki were farmed and their skins were used in the crafting of bellows. Danzaburou was the name of a human merchant in Echigo, who purportedly began caring for and trying to conserve the tanuki in Sado, and became widely respected on the island. Theory states that the tanuki itself was later worshiped as an ujigami.

== In popular culture ==
- Danzaburou appears as a boss character in the 2013 video game Muramasa Rebirth. He takes several forms over the course of the battle, including a cyclops and a pair of rokurokubi.
- Danzaburou-danuki appears as a playable character in multiple Kemono Friends games.
- Danzaburou was released as a playable character in the game Smite, announced on the game's official Twitter account on November 16, 2020.
- Mamizou Futatsuiwa, the extra stage boss of Touhou 13: Ten Desires is based on Danzaburou-danuki.
