= Shibaemon-tanuki =

Supernatural being in Japanese folklore

Shibaemon-tanuki, or Shibaemon-danuki (芝右衛門狸 or 柴右衛門狸) is a bake-danuki told in the legends of Awaji island, Hyōgo Prefecture. Along with Danzaburou-danuki of Sado island and the Yashima no Hage-tanuki of Kagawa Prefecture, he is counted among the "three famous tanuki of Japan." He is also written about in the colorful stories collection of the Edo period, the Ehon Hyaku Monogatari. While disguised as a human and in the middle of performing an act, he was attacked by a dog and killed, but the details of the tale differ depending on region and literature.

== Legend in the Hyōgo prefecture ==
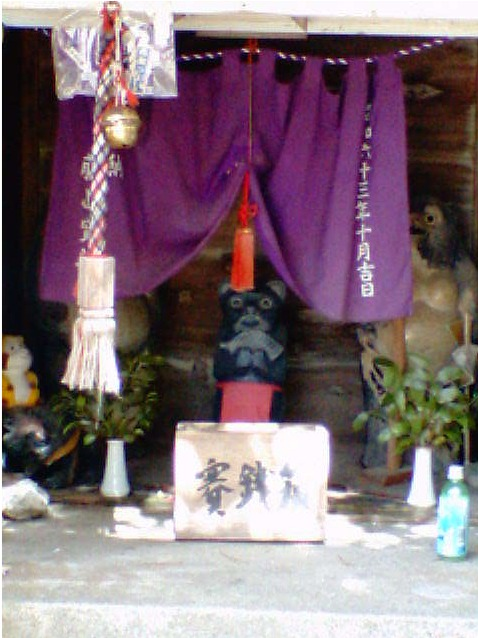
芝右衛門狸の祠

While Shibaemon-tanuki was at the summit of Mt. Mikuma (三熊山) behind the city of Sumoto, Awaji island, he lived with his wife Omasu (お増) and on moonlight nights with good weather, he drummed his belly. He performed mischief such as disguising himself as a human and making tree leaves seem like gold and sell them, but at the same time he did kind deeds such as guiding along humans who stumbled into the mountain while drunk, so nobody hated him. The people he has been kind to made offerings of 1 sho bottles of sake to where he dwelled.

One time, Shibaemon heard that there was a very popular play called Nakaza that was being performed in Naniwa (now Osaka city) and disguised himself and Omasu both as humans to Osaka. The two became quite cheerful while sightseeing around Osaka, which they have never been to before, and had a contest of disguises. The Omasu disguised herself as one of the daimyo's procession and passed in front of Shibaemon. Next up was Shibaemon to disguise himself. In front of the Omasu, there proceeded a long procession of feudal lords. Omasu praised, "you're good, you're good" and was immediately cut down by one of the warriors in the procession. The procession was not Shibaemon, but the real thing.

Shibaemon, who was stricken with grief, was about to return to Awaji, but decided to at least watch the play that Omasu wanted to see and used a technique to change tree leaves into gold and went to the theater. However, at the theater, there were tree leaves that were mixed in with the admission fees, so they suspected that a bake-danuki has slipped in among the guests and a guard dog was put on alert.

When Shibaemon was finally about to go to the see the theater and then return to Awaji for the day, when Shibaemon came to the theater, there was a big dog. Shibaemon hid his fear and passed through the entrance, but within a gap of his confidence, the dog rushed to attack. Shibaemon immediately returned to his appearance as a tanuki, was chased around by the people who brought the dog and finally hit in the head and killed. The rumor that a bake-danuki was killed in Osaka reached Awaji and since they did not hear Shibaemon drum his belly, they understood that he was killed and the people severely hated the fact that he died.

After Shibaemon's death, the people who came to see Nakaza decreased and there was a rumor that "it was a curse from having killed Shibaemon," so when the theater deified Shibaemon, the number of guests returned. Afterwards, Shibaemon, as a popular god, was deeply worshipped by many actors such as Nakamura Ganjirou, Kataoka Nizaemon and Fujiyama Kanbi. Afterwards, in what was called Shibaemon's return home, the Shrine of Shibaemon was built in Sumoto due to Nizaemon, Kanbi and others's donations. Now, the Shrine of Shibaemon is near the castle ruins of Sumoto at the peak of Mt. Mikuma and due to the legend of Shibaemon, who liked theater, there are many performers who visit the shrine even now. The Shibaemon Daimyoujin (柴右衛門大明神) that was deified in Nakaza also had a "return home" in the year 2000 and is now deified in the Sumoto Hachiman-jinja.

== Legend in the Tokushima prefecture ==
In the Edo period, at the base of Mount Seimi (勢見山) in Awa Province (now Tokushima prefecture), there was a theater business at the grounds of Kan'on-ji, and it earned great popularity.

However, one night, the dogs that were supposed to perform merely barked at the guest seats, and did not perform at all. Finally, one of the dogs jumped towards the guest seats, rushed to attack a warrior and gnawed through his throat, bringing about his death. They thought that a big incident occurred, but when the government officials examined the remains of the warrior, the note in his pocket wrote that his name was "Tanshuu Sakiyama Shibaemon," but there did not exist any such warrior by that name in Tanshuu. Furthermore, there were ten brushwood leaves in his pocket.

The next morning, when the government officials visited to inspect again, the soldier's appearance turned into a bloodstained tanuki. It was Shibaemon-tanuki. At the same time, there was the great war between the two great tanuki forces in Awa, the Awa Tanuki Gassen, and both armies wanted reinforcements, it was rumored that Shibaemon visited Awa Island in order to lend power to one of the armies.

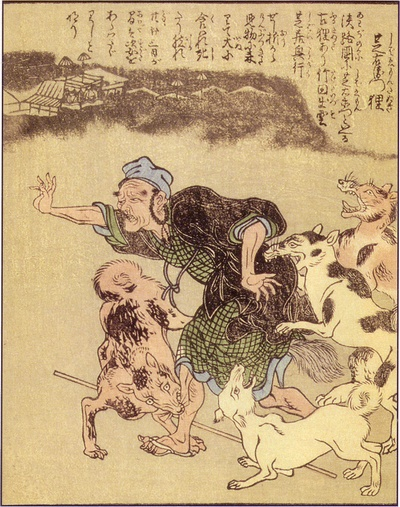
竹原春泉画『絵本百物語』より「芝右衛門狸」

== Ehon Hyaku Monogatari ==
In the past, in Awaji, there was a peasant called Shibaemon, and an old tanuki came to him and requested for food scraps, and feeling pity, he expressly left some food for the tanuki.

One day, Shibaemon amused the tanuki saying "try disguising yourself as a human" and the tanuki changed his appearance into that of a human around 50 years of age, and the tanuki came to visit Shibaemon day by day. Thus, he was informed about various legends and ancient events in great detail, and Shibaemon became greatly knowledgeable as a result, and was extravagantly praised by people.

At that time, there was a business that came from Naniwa to visit Awaji to perform a play titled "Takeda Izumo," so the tanuki disguised as an old man also went, but due to bad luck, was bitten by a dog on his way back and died. However, there was only an old tanuki, and even half a month after death his real identity did not show, and it only around the 24th and 25th of that month that the tanuki showed its true identity.

== True Identity ==
There are theories that reality of the legend of Shibaemon-tanuki is that it was an excuse for the Kougo Jihen, a struggle that broke out between Sumoto and Awa, or that it was a Dutch person who washed ashore to Japan and hid himself in a castle, and was thought of by the people beneath the castle, who have never seen foreigners before, as a tanuki who disguised as a human, among other theories.

== See also ==
- List of legendary creatures from Japan
