= Yashima no Hage-tanuki =

Legendary tanuki

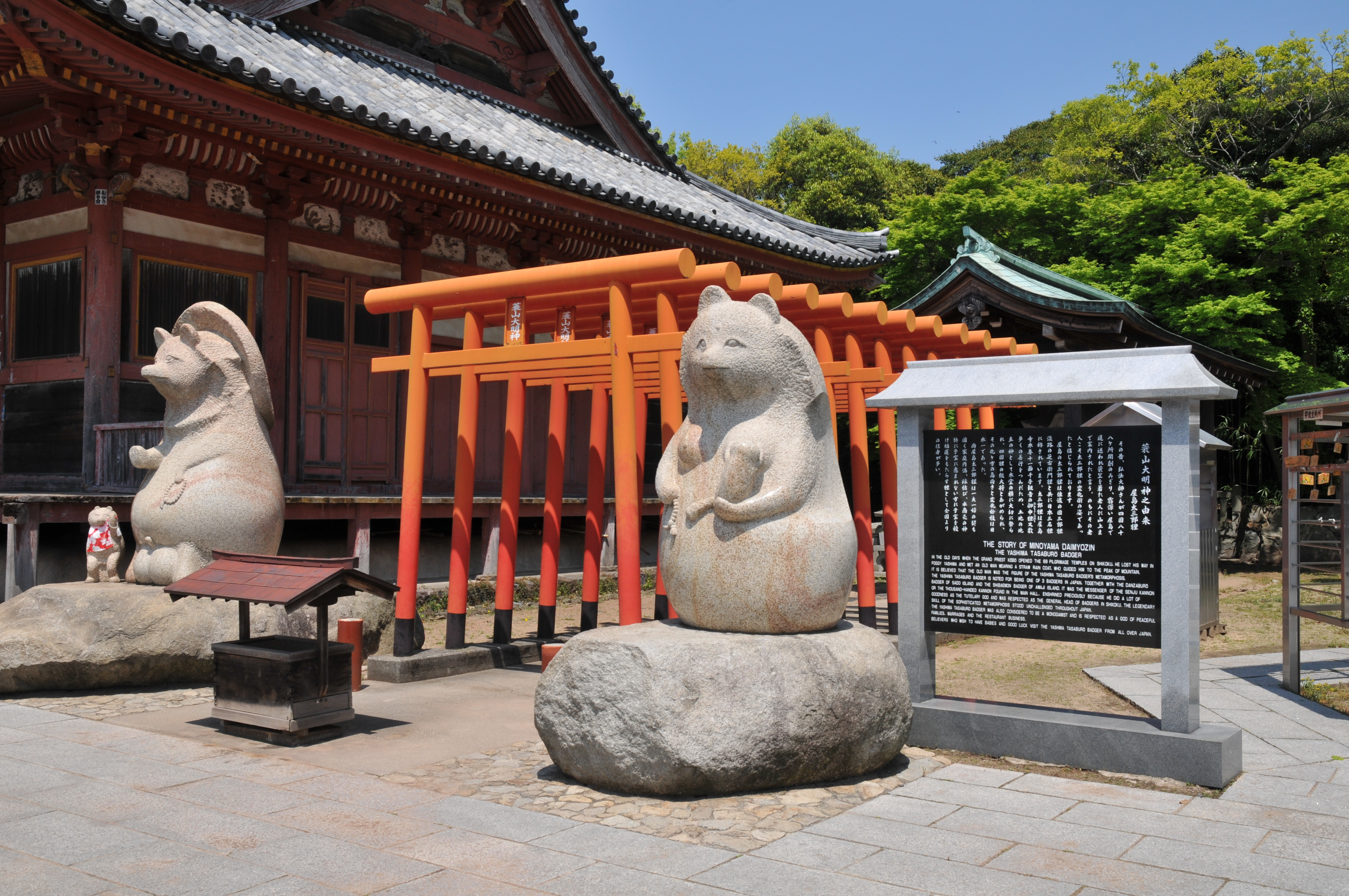
Minoyama Daimyōjin on the grounds of Yashima-ji

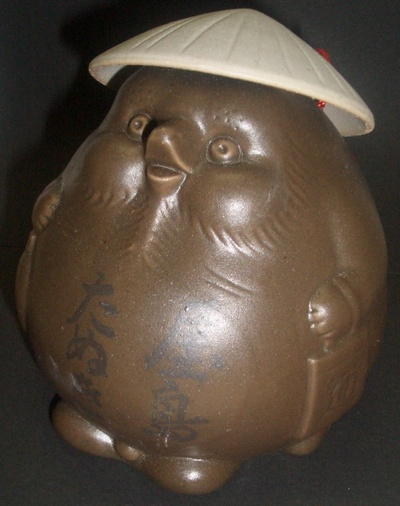
A wine bottle of Yashima-tanuki

Yashima no Hage-tanuki (屋島の禿狸) is a Bake-danuki (化け狸, Supernatural raccoon dog), who appears in the legends of Yashima, Takamatsu, Kagawa Prefecture. He is also called Tasaburō-tanuki (太三郎狸), Yashima no Hage, and Yashima no Kamuro (屋島の禿). He is counted as one of the "three famous tanuki of Japan", along with Danzaburou-danuki of Sado and Shibaemon-tanuki of Awaji. He is also famous due to his appearance in the Studio Ghibli animated movie, Heisei Tanuki Gassen Ponpoko.

== Legend ==
In the past, there was a tanuki who was wounded by a fatal arrow shot, but was saved by Taira no Shigemori. To pay his debt of gratitude, the tanuki swore to protect the Taira clan. This wounded tanuki's descendant is said to be Yashima no Hage-tanuki.

After the Taira clan was ruined, Hage-tanuki became the protector deity of Yashima-ji, the 84th temple on the Shikoku 88-temple pilgrimage. His skill at transformation was called the best in Japan, and he achieved the rank of supreme commander of the tanuki in Shikoku. In times of extreme cold, 300 tanuki of his household would gather together, and he would show phantom magic to Minamoto no Yoshitsune's Yasō Tobi (八艘飛び) and Yumi Nagashi (弓流し), as happened during the Genpei War.

One story of Hage-tanuki's death is that he was shot and killed by a hunter. In another version, he died in a contest of disguises with Shibaemon-tanuki of Awaji.

According to the latter story, while the three famous tanuki were all boasting about how they were the best in Japan, Hage-tanuki embarked towards Awaji, and challenged Shibaemon-tanuki to a contest of disguises. On the day of the match, Shibaemon saw countless naval ships appearing at sea. While Shibaemon was still in a state of surprise, believing war had broken out, the boats disappeared, and Hage-tanuki appeared. The fleet had been Hage-tanuki's disguise, successfully tricking Shibaemon. In response to Hage-tanuki's boasts of victory, Shibaemon-tanuki said that he would disguise himself as the daimyō's royal procession. On the next day, a splendid procession appeared. Hage-tanuki praised Shibaemon in a loud voice, but was reprimanded by a soldier for his insolence and was killed by a spear; it had been the real Daimyo's procession. Shibaemon, who thought this unfortunate, courteously gave him a funeral service.

After Hage-tanuki's death, his spirit moved to dwell in Awa Province (now Tokushima Prefecture), and started to possess humans. In the years of Kaei, in Hayashimura, Awa district (now Awa city), he possessed a female hairdresser, made predictions, and was said to have dropped a tanukitsuki (tanuki possession).

In the great war between tanuki that occurred in the closing years of the Edo period, the Awa Tanuki Gassen, in the village of Higaino (now Komatsushima city), spoke through possessed people and told of an event involving Hage-tanuki. After Kinkyō-tanuki and Rokuemon-tanuki killed each other, their offspring were about to try to take revenge on each other, and Yashima no Hage-tanuki arbitrated between them and settled the issue. Afterwards, in the First Sino-Japanese and Russo-Japanese wars, Hage-tanuki departed with many of his followers towards Manchuria.

Yashima no Hage-tanuki performed many good deeds, so now in Takamatsu he is called Minoyama Daimyōjin (蓑山大明神). He is the god of family happiness, marriage, and the entertainment business; and is believed to bring about good fortune to children. He has many believers from all provinces.
