= Yashima-ji =

Buddhist temple in Kagawa Prefecture, Japan

- 屋島寺
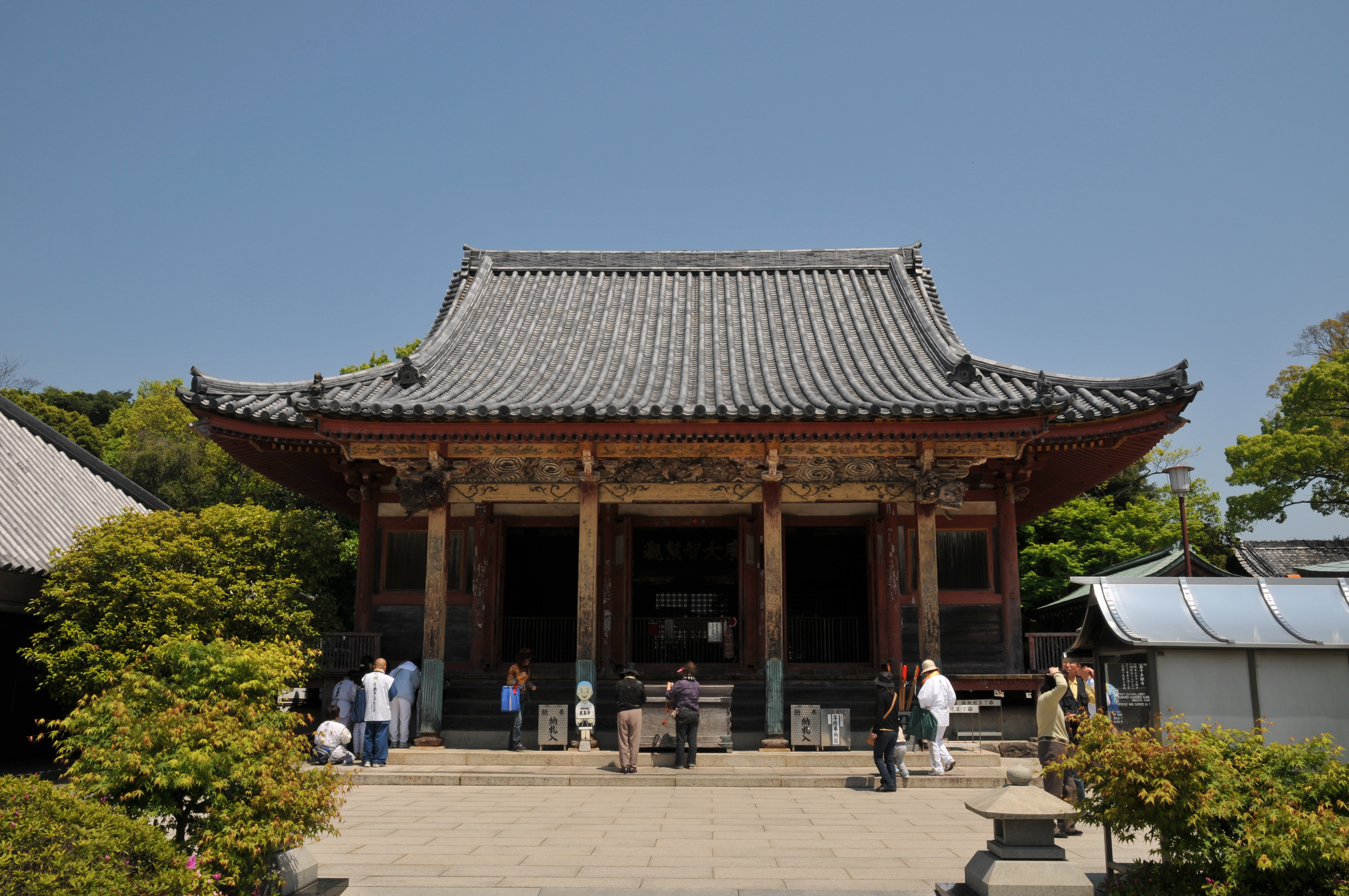
- Yashima-ji Hondō (1618), an Important Cultural Property

Religion
- Affiliation: Buddhist
- Sect: Shingon Buddhism
- Prefecture: Kagawa Prefecture

Location
- Location: 1808 Yashima Higashimachi, Takamatsu, Kagawa 761-0111
- Country: Japan
- Interactive map of Yashima-ji
- Prefecture: Kagawa Prefecture
- Coordinates: 34°21′28.5″N 134°6′4.5″E

Architecture
- Completed: 754

Website
- 88shikokuhenro.jp/en/nanmenzan-senkoin-yashimaji/

Map around Yashima-ji

Yashima-ji (屋島寺) is a Shingon temple in Yashima, a lava plateau to the northeast ofTakamatsu, Kagawa Prefecture, Japan. A branch temple of Ninna-ji in Kyoto, it is the eighty-fourth temple on the Shikoku 88 temple pilgrimage. It is said to have been founded as a Ritsu school temple by Ganjin in 754, and to have been converted by Kōbō Daishi. The 5x5 bay irimoya-zukuri tiled Hondō (1618) has been designated an Important Cultural Property. A Heian period wooden seated statue of Senjū Kannon and the temple bell (1223) are also Important Cultural Properties. There is a museum of temple treasures and items relating to the Battle of Yashima.

== See also ==
- Shikoku 88 temple pilgrimage
- Battle of Yashima
- Yashima no Hage-tanuki
- Geographic data related to Yashima-ji at OpenStreetMap
