= Yashima Station =

Yashima Station is the name of two train stations in Japan:

- Yashima Station (Kagawa) (屋島駅)
- Yashima Station (Akita) (矢島駅)
