= Inugami Gyōbu =

Legendary Japanese tanuki

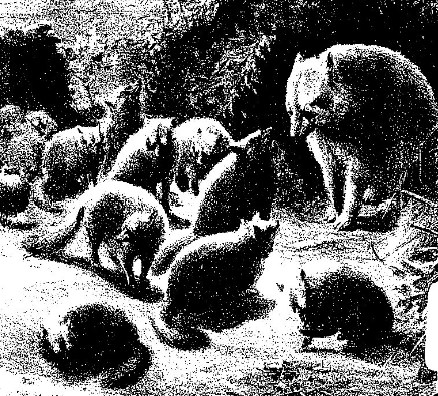
講談本『八百八狸 松山奇談』

Inugami Gyōbu (隠神刑部) or Gyōbu-danuki (刑部狸) is a bake-danuki (a monster tanuki) told about in legends passed down in Matsuyama, Iyo Province (now Ehime Prefecture). He appears in the "Tale of the Matsuyama Disturbance and the Eight Hundred and Eight Tanuki" (松山騒動八百八狸物語, Matsuyama Sōdō Happyakuya-danuki Monogatari), which is considered one of the big three tanuki tales along with the Shojoji no Tanuki-bayashi and Bunbuku Chagama.

== Outline ==
The "Tale of the Matsuyama Disturbance and the Eight Hundred and Eight Tanuki" was based on the historical record "Iyo Nagusa" (伊予名草) that told of the O-Ie Sōdō, which occurred during the Great Gyōhō Famine in 1805, and in the Edo period, and according to the kōshaku storyteller Nanryū Tanabe, it was a ghost story that added elements of tanuki and yōkai to it and became known through kōdan. For this reason, there are several variations depending on which particular kōdan storyteller told it, but the story mainly went as follows.

In Shikoku, there are many folk tales and legends about tanuki, but the tanuki of Matsuyama in particular has a history of them that goes back to the beginning of history in the ages of Emperor Tenji, and as a result of tanuki giving birth to tanuki, there were 808 of them. Its leader was Inugami Gyōbu. He lived in an old cave in Kumayama, and was a bake-danuki that continued to protect the Matsuyama Castle, and from his household of 808 tanuki, was also called "Eight Hundred and Eight Tanuki (八百八狸, Happyakuya-danuki)." He was said to have the greatest divine power in Shikoku.

The part of his name "Gyōbu"(刑部: lit. penal affairs) was a title awarded by an ancestor of the lords of the Matsuyama Castle, and he received faith from the vassals in the castle, and had a deep connection with the local people. In the era of Matsuyama Oki no Kami (松山隠岐守), the O-Ie Sōdō occurred, and Inugami Gyōbu was used by the rebel side, and he gave commands to his follower tanuki to cause strange occurrences to support the insurrection.

However, in the ghost story Inōmono no Roku, the feudal warrior Inō Budayū (稲生武太夫) punished Inugami Gyōbu with a divine rod that he received from Usa Hachiman Dai-bosatsu, and as a result, Inugami Gyōbu and the 808 of his household was sealed in Kumayama. The cave remains even today in Kutaninagumi (久谷中組), Matsuyama city, and is known as Yamaguchi Reishin (山口霊神).

== Variation ==
As stated previously, the "Tale of the Matsuyama Disturbance and the Eight Hundred and Eight Tanuki" has several variations, and because Inugami Gyōbu, who was supposed to have been the protector of the castle, supported the O-Ie Sōdō, there are various tales about the particulars of how Inugami Gyōbu was defeated by Budayū.

- As a result of the attempt by young samurai Gotō Kogenta Masanobu (後藤小源太正信) who was on the rebel side, to slay Inugami Gyōbu who he believed was getting in the way, they made a non-aggression pact that "as long as Inugami Gyōbu lends a hand to Kogenta's crises from then on, Kogenta will not kill Inugami Gyōbu," so when the rebels started to make their moves, Inugami Gyōbu had no choice but to causes strange disturbances in order to fulfill the pact. When Budayuu appeared below the castle, Inugami Gyōbu became fearful of Budayū's divine rod, because when although he wanted to avoid confronting Budayuu as an enemy and transformed him, Budayū became angry that he was transformed in this way, and made an enemy of the rebels.
- Inugami Gyōbu, who didn't think pleasantly of the castle lord at that time who was neglecting the traditions, became close to Kogenda and formed an alliance with him, and began to act to crush the castle's lord. Budayū, who was given a request to defeat the rebellion, entered Matsuyama and headed towards Inugami Gyōbu to make negotiations, found out that he was working for the rebel side, and defeated him.
- The rebel side deceived Inugami Gyōbu and treated him as an ally, but it was actually a trap, and when Inugami Gyōbu started his secret maneuvers, and since it was told to the castle lord that all the bad occurrences in the castle Inugami Gyōbu's deeds, he was made out to be a bad guy, and Budayū, who was called to help, defeated him.
- Budayū did not use a divine rod, but rather a wooden mallet that he received from the head yōkai, Sanmoto Gorōzaemon (山本五郎左衛門).

Just the opposite of Inugami Gyōbu being defeated by Budayuu, there are also stories where Inugami Gyōbu stood with the righteous side, but since he was not able to make a dent to the forces of the rebel side, he called Budayuu for help. There are also other variations, including stories where Budayuu does not play a part.

== See also ==
- List of legendary creatures from Japan
