= Yashima (surname) =

Yashima is a Japanese surname. Notable people with the surname include:

- Norito Yashima (born 1970), Japanese actor
- Taro Yashima (1908–1994), Japanese-American author and illustrator

Fictional characters:

- Mirai Yashima, character in Mobile Suit Gundam
