= Naruhito Iguchi =

Japanese actor, reporter, and voice actor

- 井口 成人
- Born: January 15, 1951 (age 75); Minamiuonuma, Niigata, Japan
- Occupations: actor, reporter, voice actor

Naruhito Iguchi (井口 成人, Iguchi Naruhito; born January 15, 1951) is a Japanese actor, reporter, and voice actor.

== Filmography ==
- The Rose of Versailles (1979), La Salle
- Ashita no Joe 2 (1980), Referee/reporter
- Maya the Honey Bee (1982), Hines
- Sasuga no Sarutobi (1982), Vice-principal

=== Dubbing ===
- Gunfight at the O.K. Corral (1975 TV Tokyo edition), Billy Clanton (Dennis Hopper)
