= Kōdan =

Style of traditional oral Japanese storytelling

Kōdan (講談; formerly known as kōshaku (講釈)) is a style of traditional oral Japanese storytelling. The form evolved out of lectures on historical or literary topics given to high-ranking nobles of the Heian period, changing over the centuries to be adopted by the general samurai class and eventually by commoners, and eventually, by the end of the Edo period, declining in favor of new types of entertainment and storytelling such as naniwa-bushi. It was at this time that the term kōshaku was abandoned and kōdan adopted. Today, after a failed attempt to revive the art in 1974, there are four schools of kōdan and only a very few performers between them. The three traditional classifications of kōdan are Gundan, Gokirokumono, and Sewamono; meaning war stories, true stories, and contemporary stories respectively.

Kōdan is usually performed sitting behind a desk or lectern, and using wooden clappers or a fan to mark the rhythm of the recitation. The original kōdan performances were recitations of Buddhist scriptures or Shinto texts, as well as other classical literatures. Performances were originally given to a mainly aristocratic audience.

During the Muromachi period (1333–1568), the form was adopted or revived by the general samurai class for educational purposes. Performances during this time were called Zashikigōshaku (Kōshaku in a room) and were performed in the homes of Daimyō. Instead of the traditional Buddhist or Shinto texts, the works read in this period were the war stories of the 12th century such as the Taiheiki, Heike Monogatari, and Genpeiseisuiki. By the beginning of the Edo period in 1600, the form had developed even further and spread to become even more commonplace. Masterless samurai (rōnin) would often support themselves by performing dramatic readings of Taiheiki or other chronicles and tales. It was at this time that the form expanded to include not just the classic standard chronicles but general historical events as well, which were not codified into a set written form. Where readers of the Heian period read directly from classical texts, kōshakushi of the Edo period prided themselves on their knowledge of history and told stories both contemporary and historical. They memorized not the precise words and phrases of a story, but the details of the events themselves, which could then be formed into a story, somewhat different each time it is told. Soon the stories began to center not around samurai and nobles, but around townsfolk, thieves, and vigilantes; the storytellers adapted to their own tastes, their own knowledge, and that of their audience, which was increasingly townsfolk and not nobility.

Not many notable practitioners are known, but an important one was Amakasu Hōin. Amakasu founded the Taiheikiba (Place where the Taiheiki is recited) at the end of the 17th century, as well as being known to perform for Tokugawa Ieyasu. Another important Kōdan storyteller was Fukai Shidōken, who lived during the early 18th century. Fukai’s style of Kōdan was more comedic and ironic, which contrasted to other contemporaneous practitioners who were more serious.

In 1700, a man by the name of Nawa Seizaemon opened the Taiheiki-ba in the Akasaka section of Edo (now Tokyo), becoming the first professional kōshakushi. Kōdan remained strong for many years, and gained a new popularity after the Meiji Restoration (1868), which, being a quite major event, supplied the performers with much new material. At one point, there were fifty performance halls in Tokyo devoted primarily or exclusively to kōdan. By the beginning of World War II, there were still six or seven.

Though the arrival of movies, records, and other forms of entertainment eclipsed kōdan in the early 20th century, the art form contributed heavily to various forms of Japanese theater and to the development in Japan of the modern popular fiction novel.

== See also ==
- Yose
