= Yashima, Kagawa =

Yashima
- District of Takamatsu City
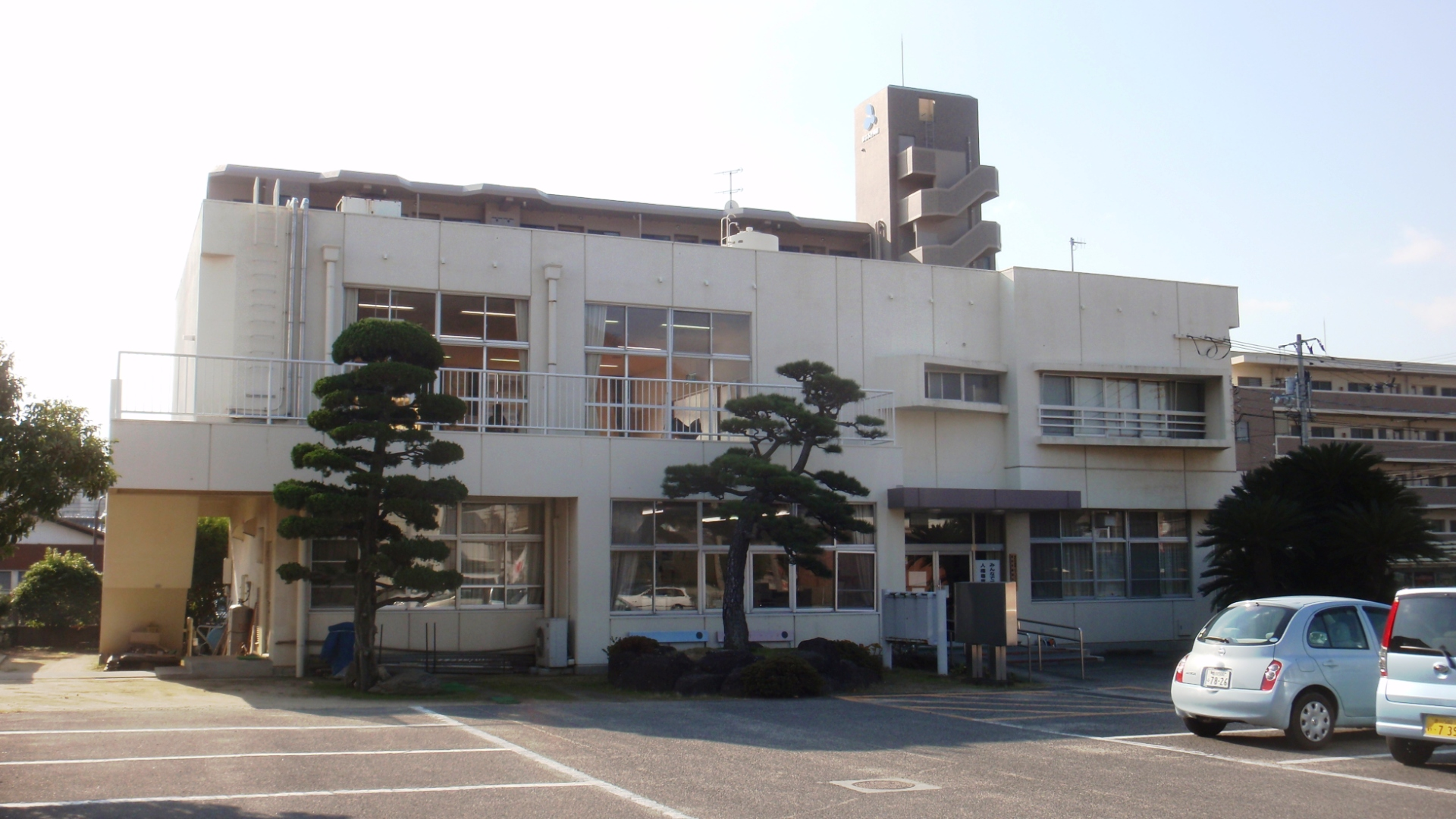
- Takamatsu City Office Yashima Branch Office

- Location within Japan
- Country: Japan
- Region: Shikoku
- Prefecture: Kagawa Prefecture
- City: Takamatsu

Area
  - Total: 10.44 km^{2} (4.03 sq mi)

Population
  - Total: 21,115
  - Density: 2,022.51/km^{2} (5,238.3/sq mi)
- Time zone: UTC+9 (JST)

Yashima (屋島地区, Yashima chiku) is a district of Takamatsu, Kagawa, Japan. At the summit, an observation deck can be found overlooking the Seto Inland Sea and the city of Takamatsu. The mountain is also noted for Yashima-ji, the 84th temple of the Shikoku 88 temple pilgrimage.

Yashima was also a decisive battleground in the Genpei War (1180–1185) between the Taira and Minamoto clans.

== See also ==
- Battle of Yashima
- Shikoku 88 temple pilgrimage
