= Tanuki statue =

Japanese figure of a raccoon dog

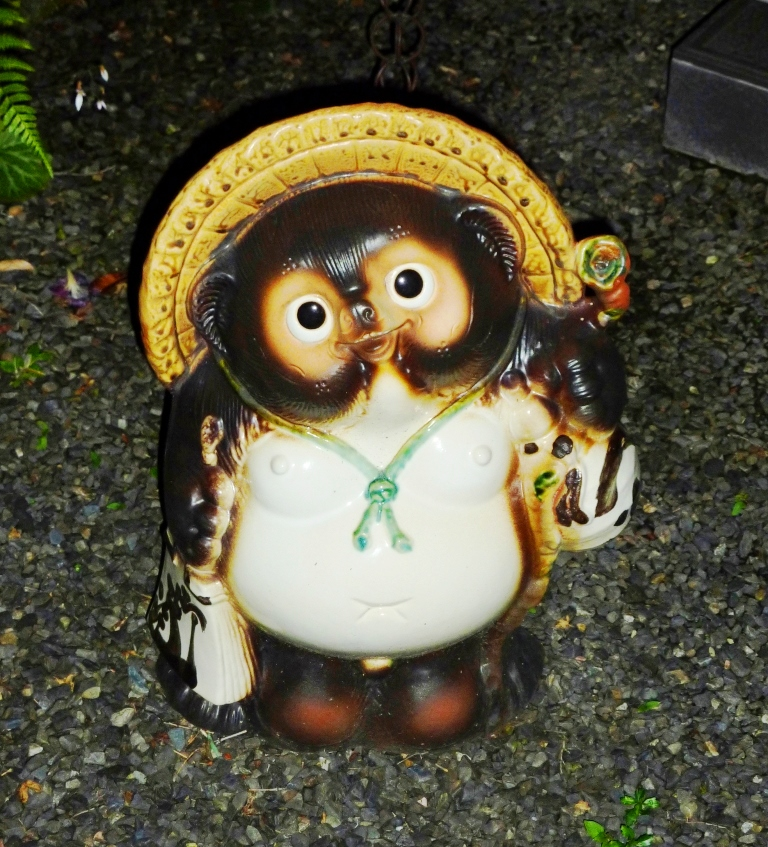
A tanuki statue in Ashikaga, Tochigi Prefecture.

A tanuki statue (狸の置物, tanuki no okimono) is a traditional Japanese figurine representing a chubby, smiling Japanese raccoon dog (tanuki), usually wearing a straw hat, holding a bottle of sake, a promissory note, and an exaggerated scrotum. Originating in local folklore from the Kansai region, these okimono, usually made of ceramic, are an omnipresent element of Japanese craftsmanship. Considered a symbol of luck and prosperity, they can be seen throughout Japan, especially in rural areas and near establishments such as shops, inns, and places of worship.

== Overview ==
=== Names and etymology ===
The name tanuki no okimono (狸の置物) simply means "tanuki ornament." It is also sometimes referred to as Shigaraki-yaki tanuki (信楽焼狸; "Shigaraki ceramic tanuki"), since these sculptures mainly come from the small town of Shigaraki in Shiga Prefecture. In fact, the figurine does not have a single standardized name, and there is no clear consensus across translations.

== Description ==
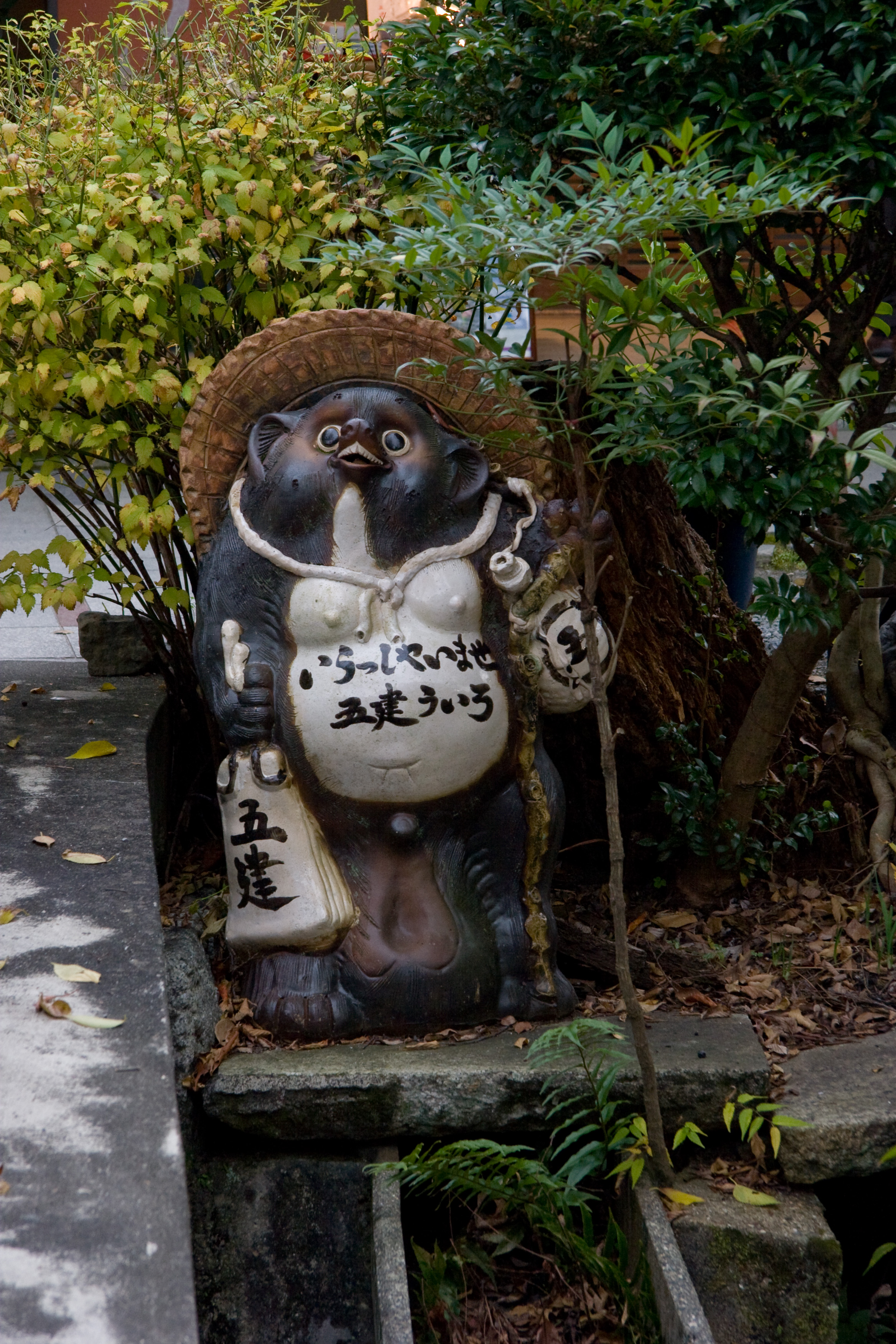
A tanuki statue on the Philosopher's Path in Kyoto.

The statues are usually brown in color, ranging from light brown to nearly black. The ears are generally rounded on the sides of the head, but some older statues without straw hats have more pointed, upright ears positioned on top of the head.

=== Attributes and symbolism ===
Among the tanuki’s attributes are:

- the straw hat (笠, kasa), made of rice straw, protecting against rain, sometimes with a string to carry it on the back. It symbolizes the virtue of foresight and preparedness against misfortune or unexpected troubles. The word 笠 (kasa) is a homophone of 傘 (kasa), meaning umbrella;
- the belly (腹, hara), representing the virtues of self-control, serenity, confidence, and boldness. In some cases it is called 大腹 (daifuku, “big belly”), a homophone of 大福 (daifuku, “great fortune”);
- the tail (尾, o), symbolizing constant effort, unshakable determination, and perseverance. It embodies the idea of carrying out one’s goals with resolve while renouncing selfish interests;
- the promissory note (通, tsū), representing sincerity, honesty, and the ability to earn others’ trust;
- the eyes (目, me), symbolizing discernment, vigilance, awareness, and the ability to make sound judgments based on clear understanding;
- the face (顔, kao), symbolizing grace, kindness, and a welcoming attitude, as well as amiability and benevolence;
- the tokkuri (徳利, a small flask for sake), symbolizing gratitude for daily food and drink, as well as the virtues of moderation for a long life. It also embodies a virtuous, moral, and honorable lifestyle;
- the money bag (金袋, kinbukuro), a euphemism for the scrotum (kintama キンタマ; “golden balls”), symbolizing the promise of increasing wealth or financial prosperity.

In addition to the eight attributes, the tanuki also carries symbolic meaning in its name, which sounds like ta-nuki (他抜き; “to surpass others”), with the idea that even if the animal faces stronger opponents, it can use kindness, cunning, or humility to escape bad situations.

== History ==
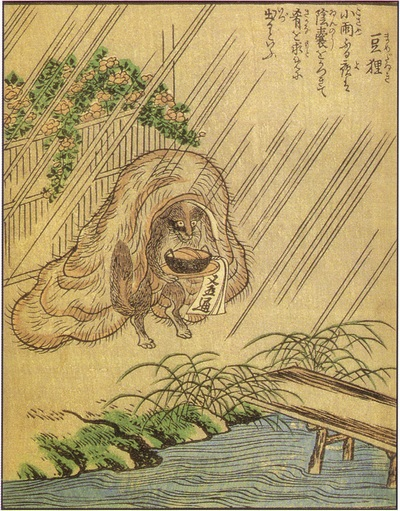
Illustration of a mame-danuki carrying a sake flask and promissory note, protected from the rain by its large scrotum, in the Ehon Hyaku Monogatari.

The general public often mistakenly believes that tanuki statues are ancestral relics of old Japan, confusing them with the Shigaraki ceramics called tsubo (壷), whose crafting techniques date back to the 12 century. Since these statues are widespread throughout Japan, they are sometimes associated with a “standard” form of bake-danuki, the mythical form of the raccoon dog in Japanese folklore.

The iconography of the tanuki holding a sake flask originates in the association of raccoon dogs with the Nada region, located between Osaka and Kobe. Called mameda (豆狸; “bean field animal”) and later mame-danuki (豆狸; “bean-tanuki”), it was described as a yōkai with a strong liking for red beans and sake, to the point of stealing them from humans on rainy days. A belief among brewers in the region held that only mamedanuki could produce good sake, reinforcing the association between tanuki and alcohol production.

By the late 16th century, Nada was already a major sake-producing area. Locals would bring flasks to fill directly from brewers’ barrels. Children often accompanied their parents or were tasked with filling the flasks, sometimes failing to honor the promissory notes given in exchange. Such tales inspired stories and songs about mamedanuki carrying a sake flask in one hand and a promissory note it never repaid in the other.

The first known tanuki statues date back to the late 19th century and were called Sake kai kozō no tanuki (酒買い小僧の狸; “tanuki boy buying sake”) or simply Sake kai tanuki (酒買い狸; “sake-buying tanuki”), though their precise origin remains unclear.

These statues borrowed elements from the folkloric bake-danuki, such as the large belly and oversized scrotum, which in reality were associated with the use of tanuki skin in percussion instruments or metalworking. More modern elements appeared, like the straw hat—likely inherited from depictions of mamedanuki sheltering from the rain with lotus leaves, umbrellas, or their own scrotum, though hats are absent in the oldest depictions.

The current standardized representation, now widespread in Japan, was reportedly developed by Fujiwara Tetsuzō, a potter who settled in Shigaraki in 1936 and devoted his career to tanuki statues, inspired by seeing a bake-danuki perform belly drumming as a child in Kyoto. In 1951, during an imperial visit, the town prepared a row of tanuki statues waving flags. Emperor Hirohito was so charmed by the welcome that he wrote a poem about it. The story, widely covered by the media, greatly contributed to the statues’ popularity.

== Influence ==
=== Variants ===
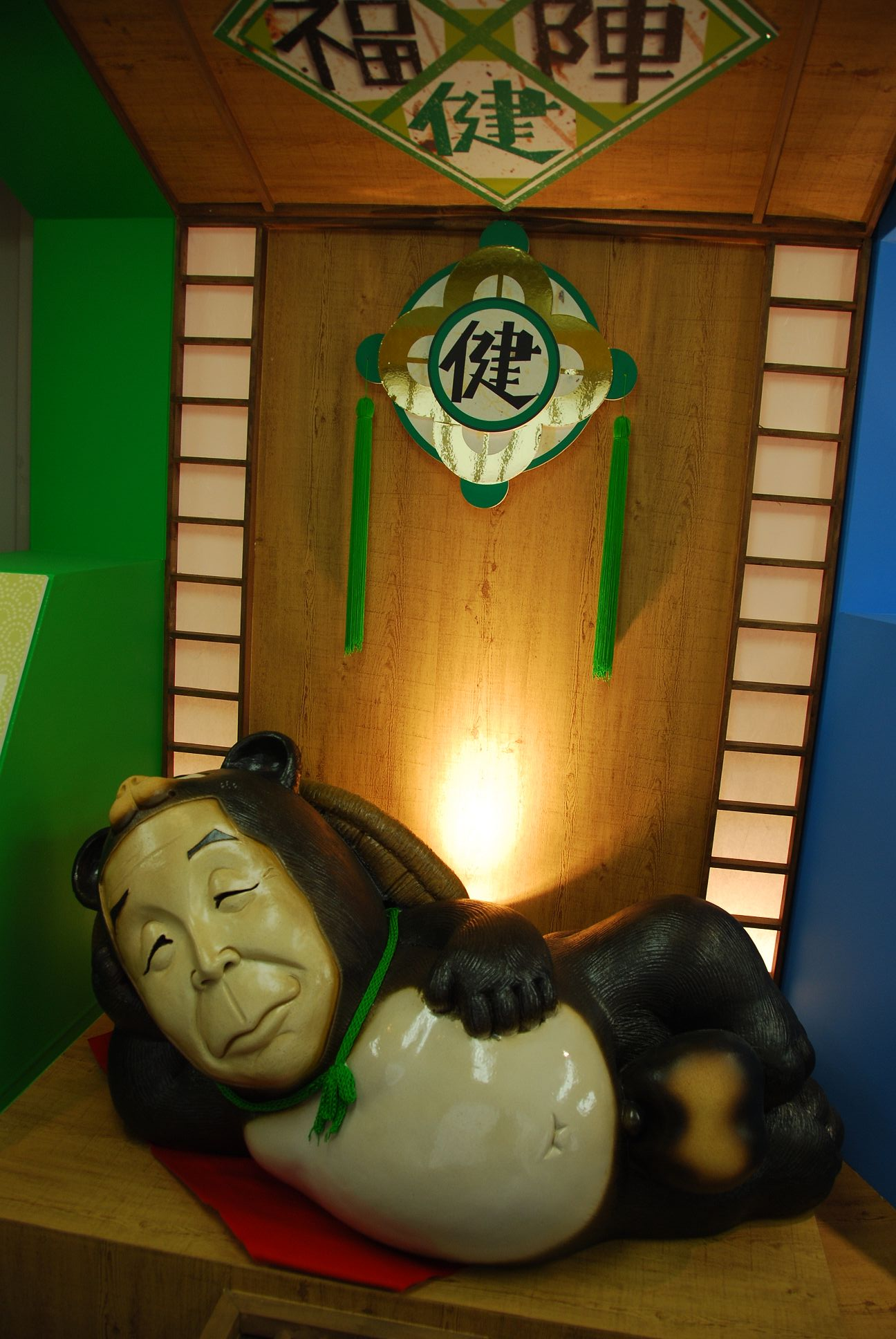
A Shigaraki ceramic tanuki statue with the face of Japanese actor Kanpei Hazama, at Osaka Castle.

Though traditionally depicted standing with a round belly and male attributes, tanuki statues exist in many variants. Some adopt alternative postures, such as reclining or crossing arms, while others are inspired by local folktales such as Bunbuku chagama. Female tanuki statues exist, sometimes with breasts or carrying babies, as well as statues holding various objects such as lanterns or other animals, especially owls. Many statues wear costumes, most often monks’ robes or even Santa Claus outfits. Some incorporate hybrid features, such as raccoon-striped tails, or depict other animals or humans, including caricatured celebrities.

=== Other domains ===
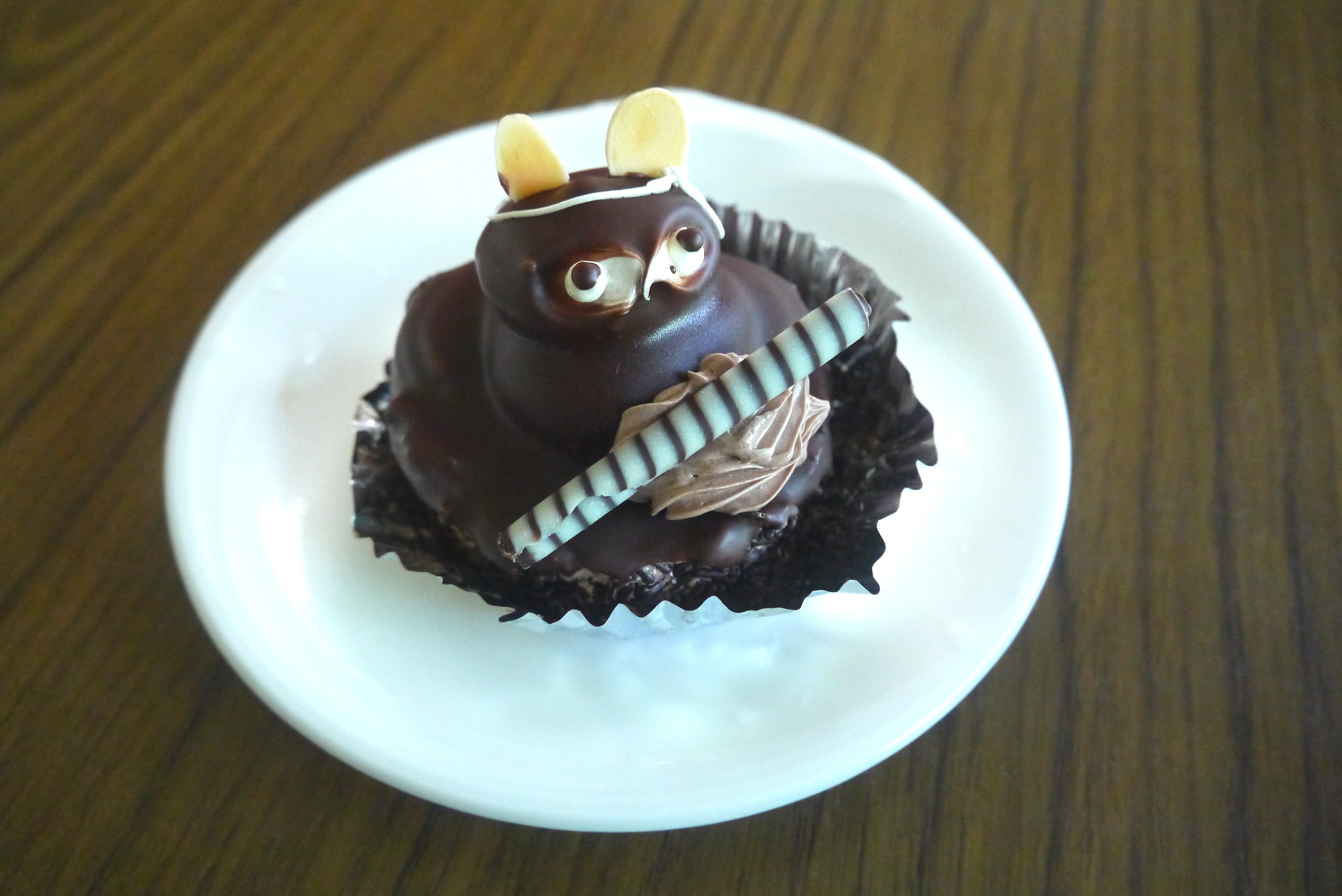
A tanuki kēki.

Since 2012, November 8 has been celebrated as "Shigaraki Tanuki Day" (信楽たぬきの日; Shigaraki tanuki no hi). The event, created to honor the tanuki’s role in local culture, also promotes other aspects of Shigaraki production, with festivities lasting several weeks.

In confectionery, tanuki kēki (狸ケーキ; “tanuki cake”) is a small cake resembling the ceramic figures, made of custard cream covered in chocolate, placed on a pastry base such as a cupcake, tart, or fondant. It is sometimes sold under names like pompoko, badjā (“badger”) or burerō (blaireau, french for badger) but mistranslations often lead to retaining the name "tanuki."

== Gallery ==
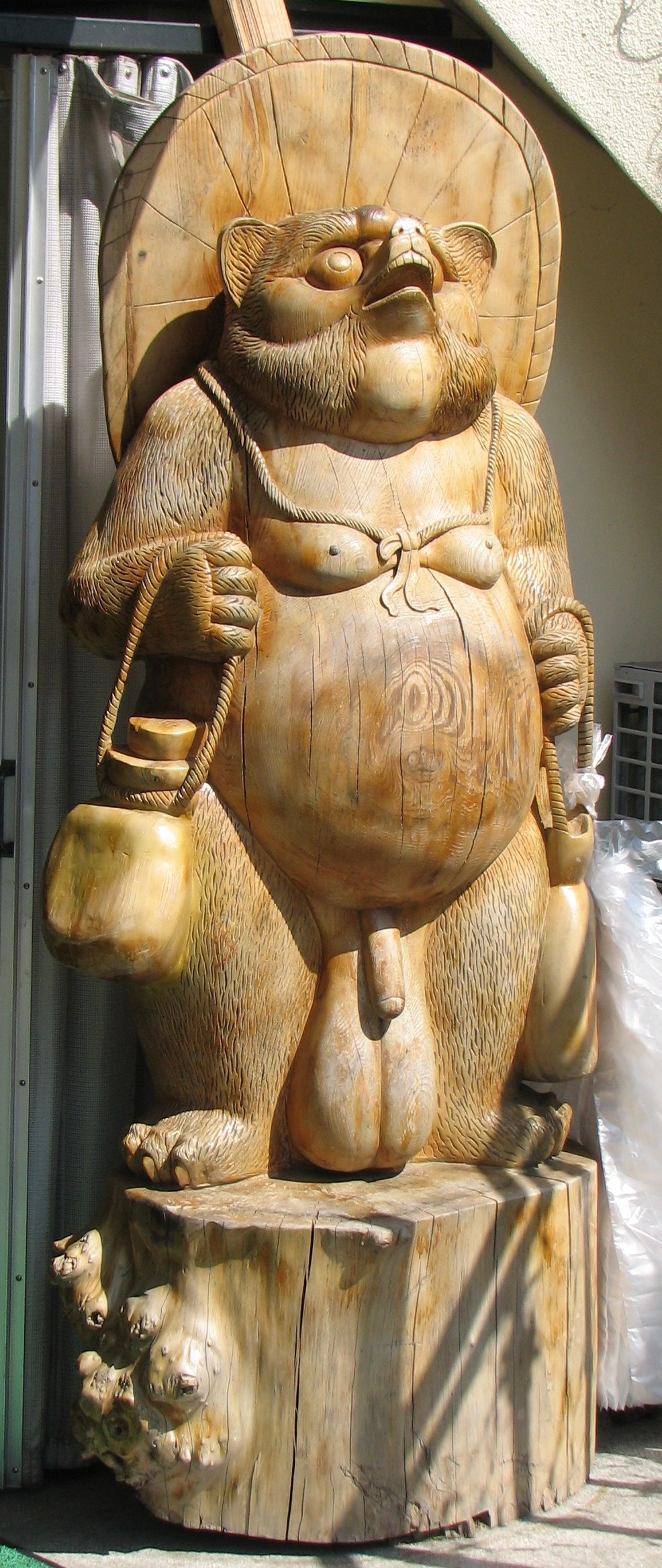
A wooden tanuki sculpture in Unzen.

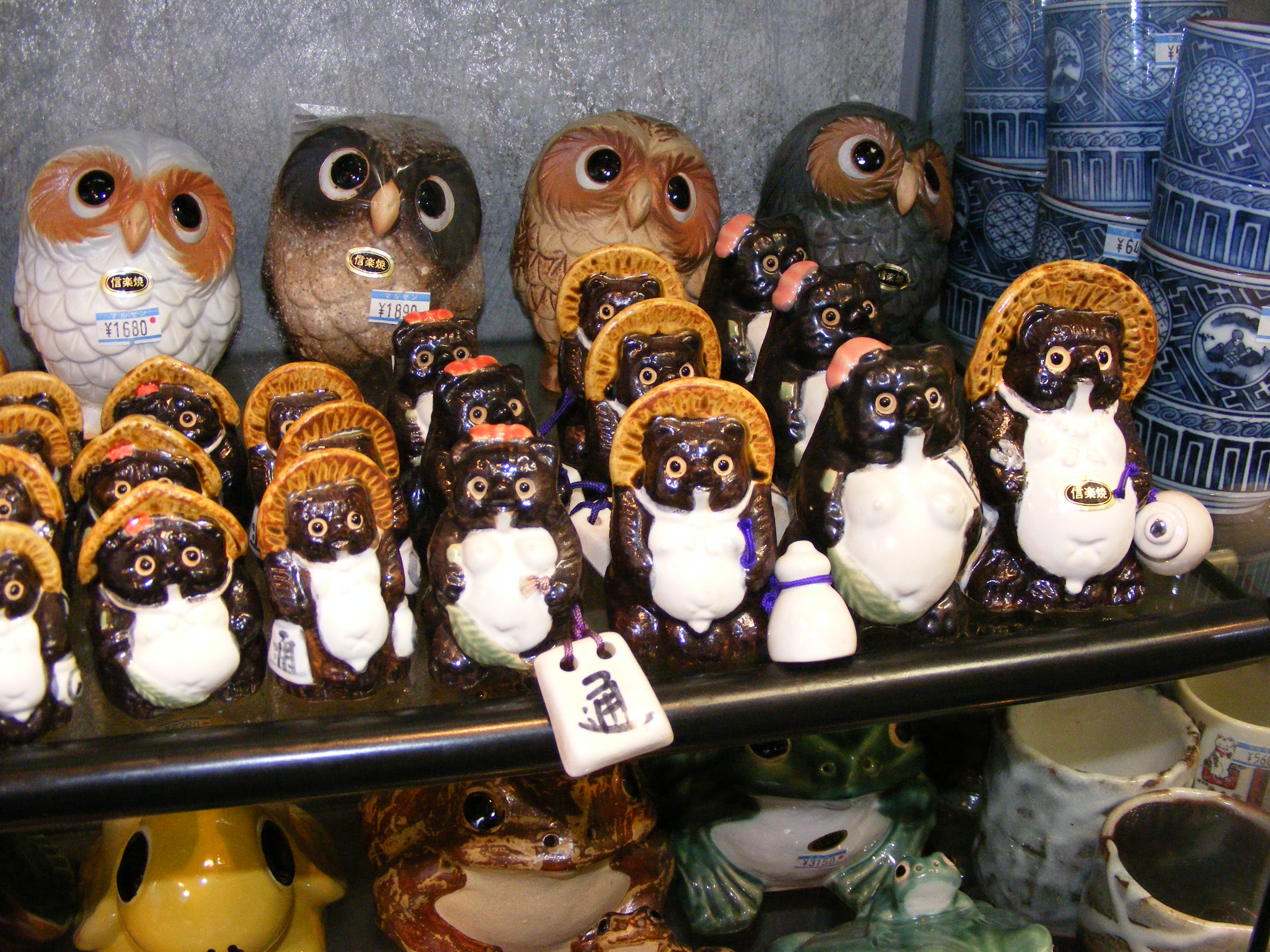
Small Shigaraki ceramic tanuki statues, with owls.

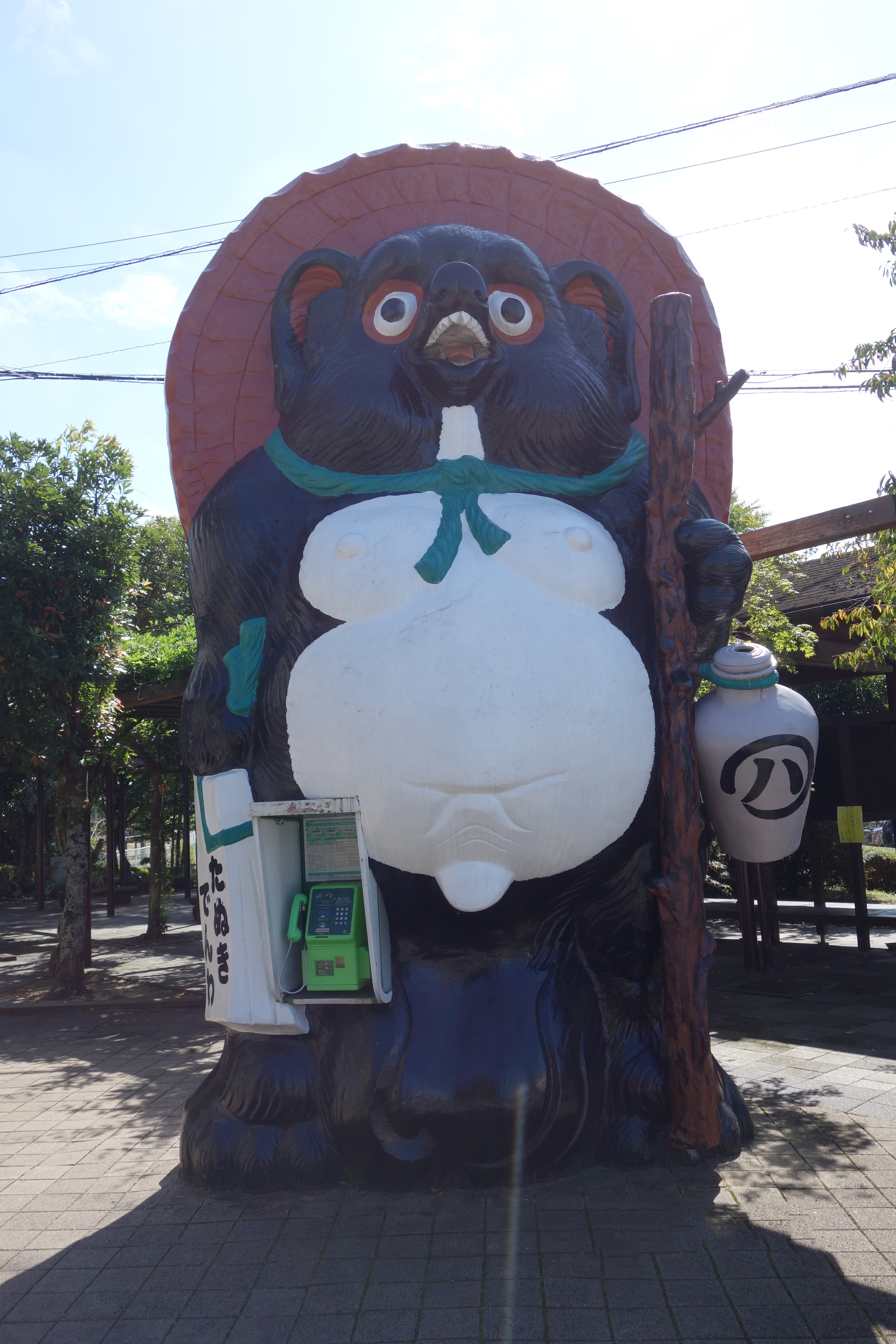
A phone booth shaped like a giant tanuki at Shigaraki Station.

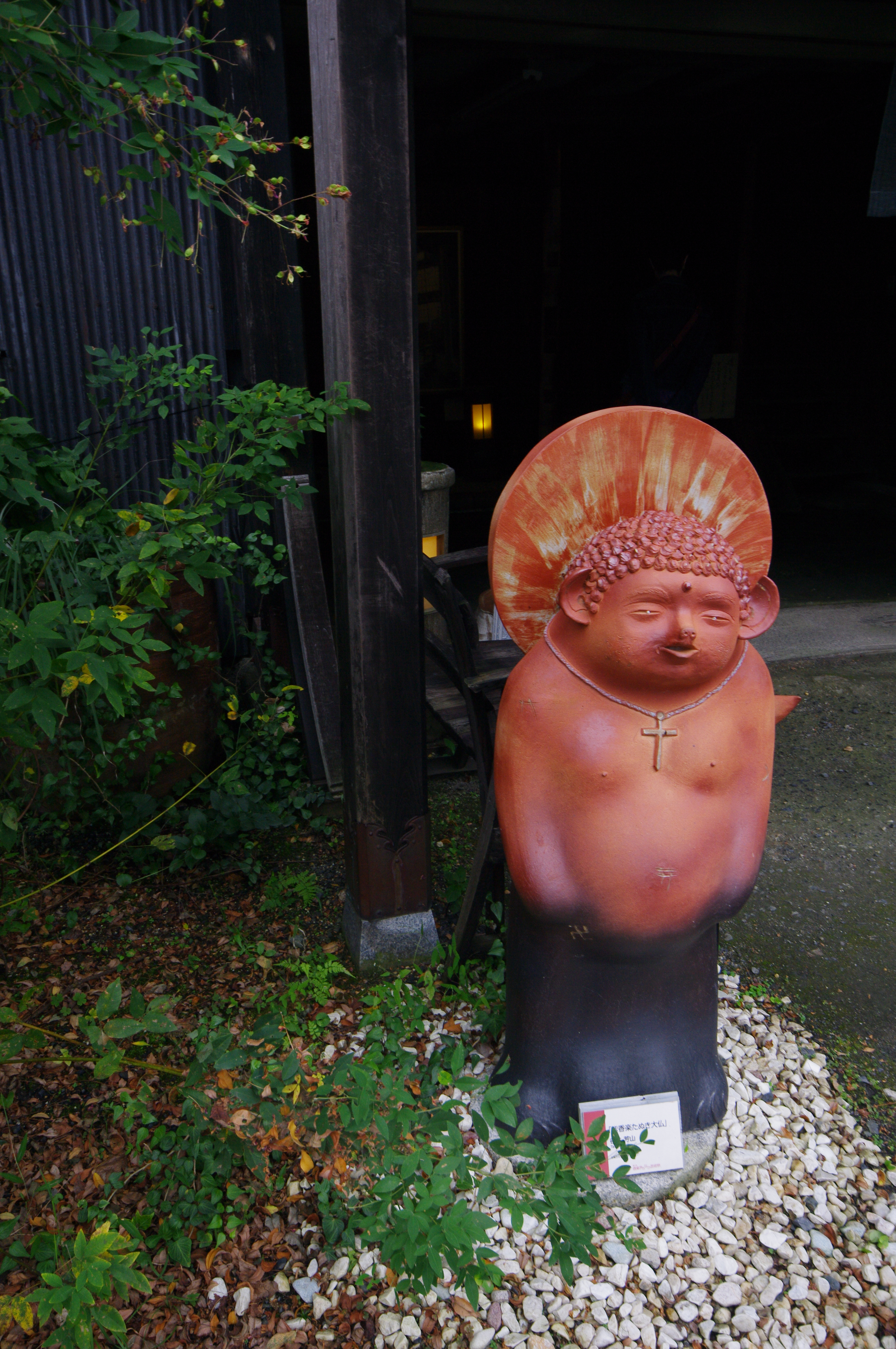
A tanuki statue modeled after a Buddha.

== See also ==
- Japanese raccoon dog
  - Bake-danuki
- Okimono
- Maneki-neko
- Shigaraki ware
