= Bunbuku Chagama =

Japanese folk tale

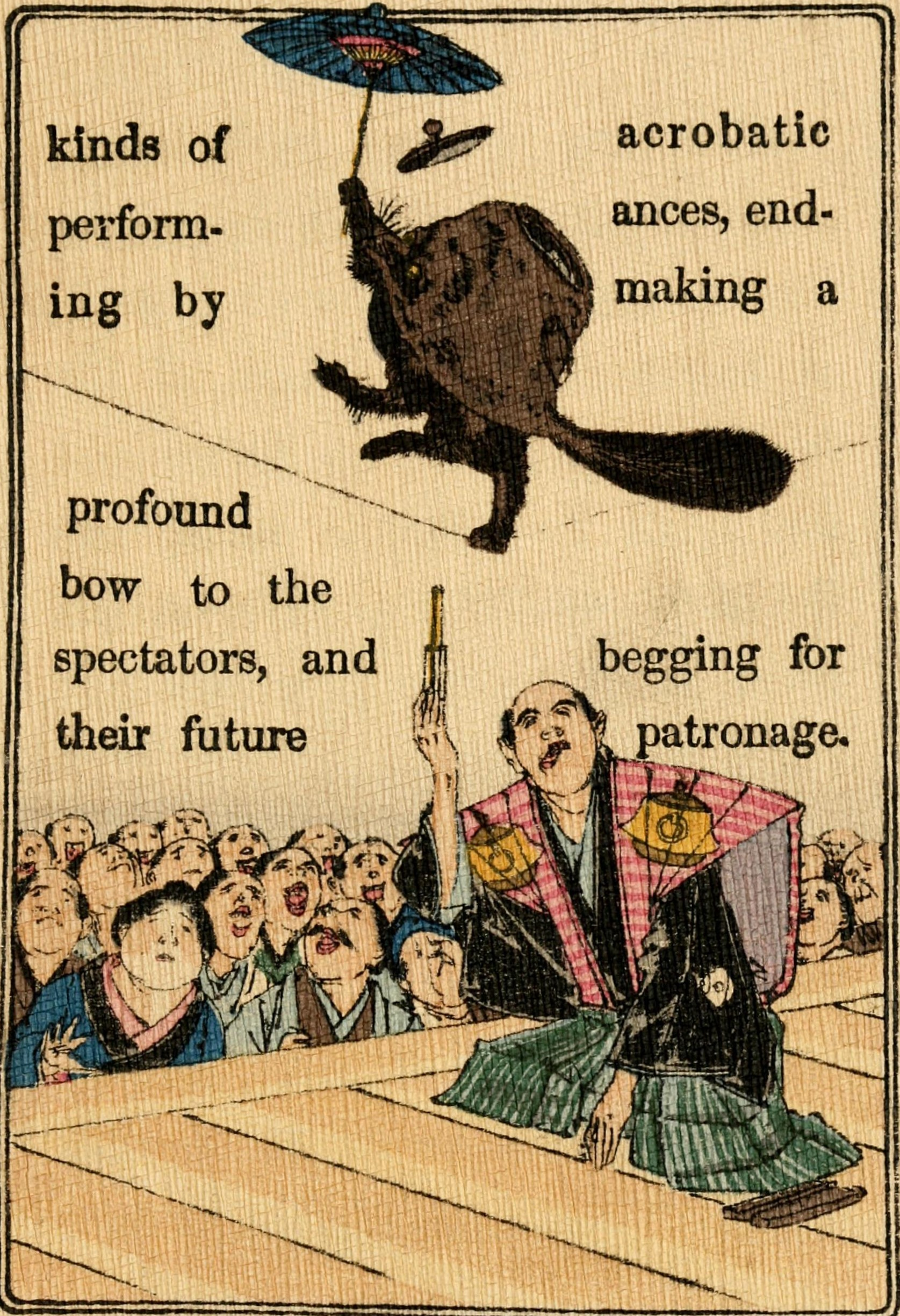
Bunbuku chagama performing tightrope. ―Mrs. T. H. James, "The Wonderful Tea Kettle" (1886)

Bunbuku Chagama (分福茶釜 or 文福茶釜) , literally "Bunbuku tea-kettle", is a Japanese folktale or fairy tale about a tanuki (raccoon dog), that uses its shapeshifting powers to reward its rescuer for his kindness.

== Overview ==
The fairy tale version has been translated into English as "The Accomplished and Lucky Teakettle" (1871) by Mitford and as "The Wonderful Tea Kettle" (1886) in the crepe-paper book series published by T. Hasegawa. The raccoon dog is ill-treated as a tea-kettle at a temple and sold off; it later performs a dance and tightrope walking routine, and the subsequent owner turned showman acquires great wealth.

In most folk tale versions, the raccoon dog or fox transforms into a kettle so that its human friend or benefactor can make profit by selling the fake kettle, typically to a priest.

In legend, Bunbuku chagama is the name of a tea kettle owned by priest Shukaku who turned out to be an ancient raccoon dog or mujina, the supposed kettle still on view at Morin-ji temple which Shukaku served.

== Etymology ==
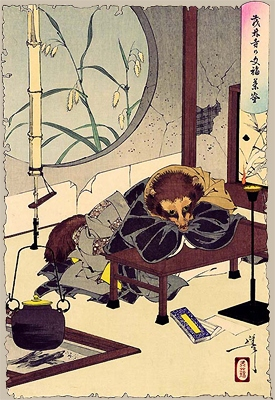
The fairy tale originated from the legend of the raccoon dog priest (Shukaku) of Morin-ji, who owned a magic "luck-sharing" tea kettle Bunbuku chagama. ―Tsukioka Yoshitoshi, 1889-1892.

One suggested hypothesis is that bunbuku is an onomatopeic word mimicking the sound of boiling water, while the character buku (fuku) in the name denotes "good luck" or "good fortune".

A second explanation is that bunbuku when written as 分福 means "sharing (bun) the wealth/fortune/luck (fuku)". This is according to the origin tale (engi) surrounding Morin-ji, and the essay Kasshi yawa. (Note: Kasshi yawa interpolates a verbatim copy of the origin tale.)

Yet another theory claims that the correct name is Bunbuka (文武火), with bunka signifying a mild flame and buka signifying an intense flame. This explanation is given, for example, by Toriyama Sekien.

== Fairy tale ==
The following summary is based on three early English translations of the fairy tale version. (Note: The story-line of the Iwaya Sazanami otogi banashi (fairy tale) version, as well as the early English translation by Mitford (1871) and the translation by Mrs. T. H. James (1880s) for the crepe paper book series.)

At a temple called Morin-ji in Kōzuke Province (now Gunma Prefecture), (Note: "province of Jôshiu" (Mitford); "province of Kotsuke" (James); "province of Kodzuke" (Iwaya/Riddell)) the master priest (abbot) (Note: A high priest (oshō).) owns a chagama (tea kettle). When the priest sets the kettle on a hearth, (Note: Iwaya Sazanami gives ro (爐) "hearth, furnace", translated as "fire", which is vague, but in other Japanese texts it is given as irori or sunken hearth, and the illustrations in Mitford or James's translations depict an irori.) the kettle sprouts a head and a tail (or legs as well), and turns into a half-badger, half tea-kettle creature. What is loosely translated as a "badger" here is strictly speaking a tanuki or raccoon dog.

The priest and his novices (Note: novices (James trl, Riddell tr.); pupils (Mitford); kobōzu (小坊主) (Iwaya)) subdue it, and since it reverts to the form of an ordinary kettle, they sell it to a traveling tinker or rag-peddler. (Note: Iwaya here gives kuzuya (屑屋) or "junk dealer", the translation given in Sakade (2012) [1958]. Murai (1868) also gives kuzuya (くづや). The profession of this merchant could vary from kamikuzuya (紙屑屋) "paper scrap dealer" to furudōguya (古道具屋) "used hardware dealer" to ikakeya (鋳掛屋) "tinker".) The kettle reveals its half-tanuki form to the peddler, (Note: And introduces itself as Bunbuku Chagama ("Bumbuku-Chagama"), James's tr.)) and the merchant acts on a friend's advice to command the beast to perform tricks, or, is persuaded by the tanuki itself, which bargains to perform acrobatics in exchange for being well-treated. The peddler agrees to neither put it over hot flame nor stow it away in a stuffy box, and share what food he has.

The man sets up a circus-like roadside attraction and charges admission for people to see the tea-kettle badger walking a tightrope to the tune of music. The man becomes wealthy, and returns the kettle to Morin-ji temple.

== Translations ==
A. B. Mitford published a version of it entitled "The Accomplished and Lucky Teakettle" in Tales of Old Japan (1871), illustrated by woodcuts from drawings by the artist "Ôdaké".

A similar (slightly more elaborate) plot is found in "The Wonderful Tea Kettle" (June 1886), the retelling by Mrs. T. H. James (Kate James), published by Hasegawa Takejirō as Japanese Fairy Tale Series No. 16 (these books are classed in the chirimen-bon or "crepe-paper books" genre). The artist, who was not credited in print, has been identified as Yoshimune Arai (新井芳宗) from the signature on the cover art.

Also of similar plot is the Japanese version retold by Iwaya Sazanami, also published in English as "The Tea-Kettle of Good-Luck" in the anthology Iwaya's Fairy Tales of Old Japan (1903) translated by Hannah Riddell. Iwaya's version that appeared in Nihon Otogibanashi is said to have established enduring recognition of the tale in Japan.

The tale has also been referred to as "The Lucky Tea-Kettle" by Basil Hall Chamberlain, under a handbook entry for "Fairy tales".

== Folktale ==
The tale group "Bunbuku chagama (Bunbuku Tea-kettle)" has been categorized as Types of Japanese Folktales No. 130 by Keigo Seki. Seki here treats the tale group as one involving the fox, and summarizes as follows:

The fox is captured or tricked by a man and transforms into a tea kettle; the man then sells the kettle, typically to a high priest (oshō). When the kettle is scrubbed, it yells "ouch", and when placed on fire, it yells "hot" and starts dancing. Subsequently it flees, or returns to the seller, and/or performs dances in tea-kettle form to profit the owner.

The dancing raccoon dog, which is a familiar motif in the fairy tale, is comparatively rare among folk tales.

=== Fox and tanuki ===
Seki's Japanese publications (Nihon mukashibanashi shūsei and Nihon mukashibanashi shūsei) classes the tale group as number 237B, and allows either fox or tanuki for the role.

Indeed, there are both fox or tanuki folktale examples.

One example involving a "badger" (raccoon dog (狸, tanuki)) is the English-summarized folktale "Bunbuku Teakettle" collected from Shimoina District, Nagano. (Note: A full text of the tale in Japanese is given in Seki, Nomura & Oshima (1978), Nihon mukashibanashi taisei 6, honkaku mukashibanashi V, pp. 113–114.) This tale is quite similar to the untranslated fox tale "Bage-chagama (化げ茶釜)" ("Shapeshifting teakettle") from Shiwa District, Iwate: in either case, the beast-kettle is sold for 3 ryō and flees to the mountains in the end.

=== Fuzzy classification ===
It was the opinion of Kunio Yanagita that tales in this Bunbuku group (Note: Yanagita-Mayer #122. "Bumbuku Teakettle"; Seki's type No. 130 "Bunbuku chagama") and "Fox Harlot" (狐遊女, kitsune yūjo) tale group[s] (Note: Yanagita-Mayer #123 "The Fox Harlot"; Types of Japanese Folktales No. 131 "The Fox and the Horse Dealer" and No. 132 "The Fox Prostitute" in Seki's scheme.) are of a common type in the wider sense and not quite distinguishable. This is because "Fox Harlot" not only transforms into harlot, but in some cases may change into a teakettle, horse, and harlot, exhibiting three transformation motifs in all. (Note: "The gratitude of the fox" (狐報恩, kitsune hōon) from Kamihei District, Iwate which Kunikida lists has the three transformation motifs.) (Note: Seki in Shūsei and Taisei classes the tale of the fox that performs three transformations as type "327A Bunbuku chagama".) One folktale Seki entitled "The Good Fortune kettle" is such a case, where the fox transforms into a kettle, girl, and horse.

Seki also expressed opinion similar to Yanagita's, saying that tale types such as "Bunbuku chagama", "The Fox and Horse-dealer", and "The Fox Prostitute/Harlot" all belong to a larger group of tales known in the West as the "Sorcerer's Apprentice" type (ATU 325).

== Origins ==
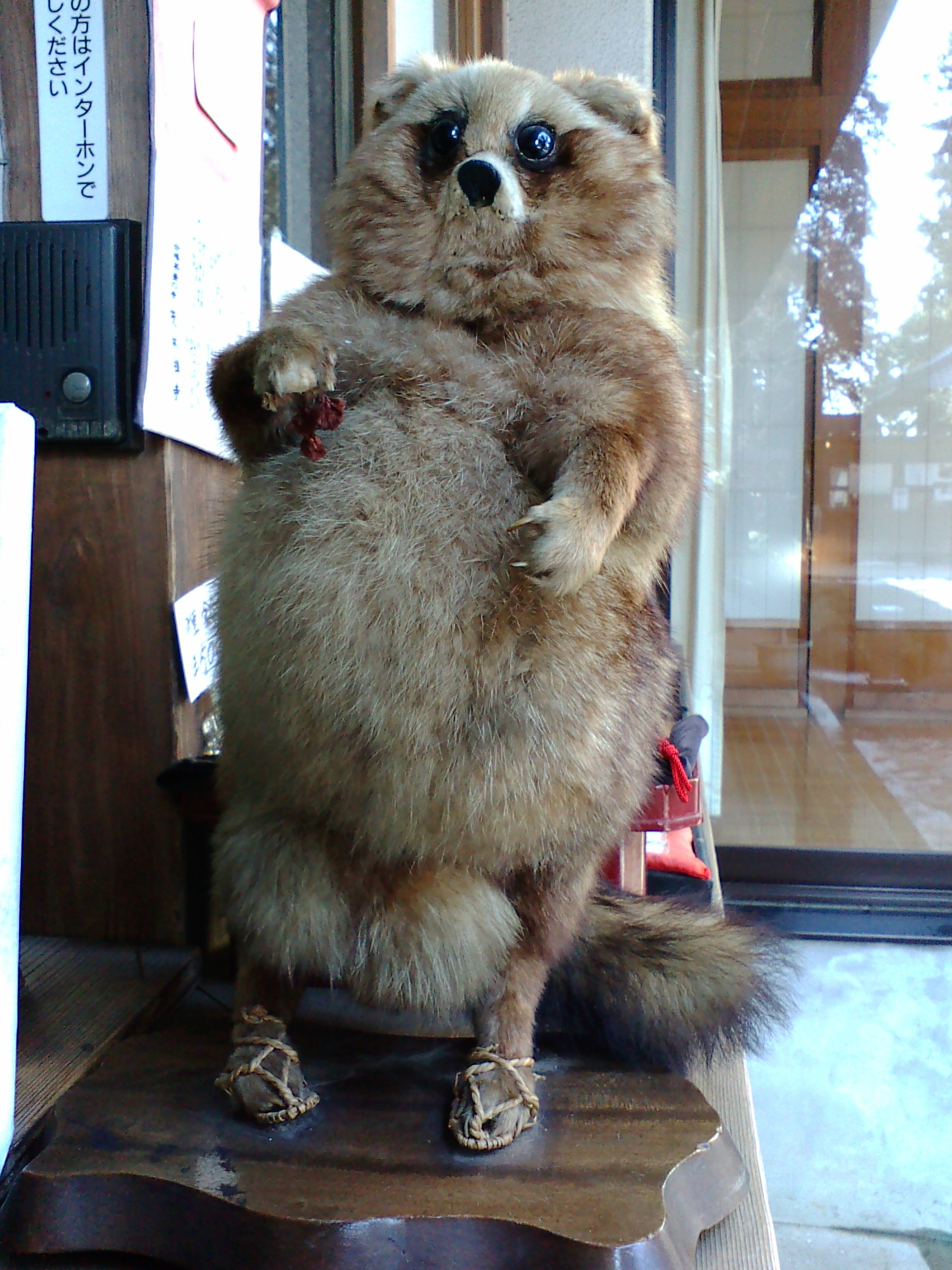
Taxidermy of a raccoon dog (tanuki), with waraji on its hind feet, displayed at Morin-ji.

The fairy tale version is thought to be connected to the legend about an inexhaustible tea kettle at the temple Morin-ji in Tatebayashi, Gunma, owned by a priest named Shukaku (守鶴) who turned out to be an ancient mujina (raccoon dog or badger).

The nineteenth century fairy tale (such as represented by Iwaya Sazanami's version) may also be descended from the seventeenth to eighteenth century Edo Period popular fiction of the akahon type.

=== Morin-ji legend ===
The priest Shukaku (who later turned out to be a raccoon dog) had accompanied the priest who founded the Morinji-temple during the Ōei era (year 1426); then while serving the 7th abbot Shukaku brought out an inexhaustible tea-kettle or cauldron (chagama), able to supply hot water day and night without running out, and thus was able to serve tea to over one thousand priests (the occasion was a thousand-man Buddhist service held in 1570). Shukaku said the kettle was called Bunbuku chagama because it had eight virtues and shared (bun) its fortunes (fuku); it imparted immunity from thirst ailment, virtue in both scholarly and martial arts, intelligence, fearlessness, popular affection, luck and advancement, and longevity.

==== Shukaku ====
As to what became of Shukaku, during the tenure of the 10th abbot at the temple, rumors began to circulate that he would all of a sudden grow furry in his limbs and sprout a tail. Shukaku then confessed to being a mujina aged several thousand years. He had heard the preaching of the Buddha Sakyamuni at Holy Eagle Peak, moved to the Tang Empire and has lived in Japan these 800 or so years. Before he left he showed his friends conjured up visions of the Battle of Yashima and the Buddha preaching before a crowd of Buddhist saints (rakan).

The aged raccoon dog first living in India and China before coming to Japan resembles the circumstance of Tamamo-no-Mae, the legendary female nine-tailed fox, and the motif is thought to be modeled on that vixen legend.

In variant recensions, Shukaku was a nassho (納所) "sexton", and the revelation of his tea kettle occurred at the gathering in Tenshō 10 or 7 (1582 or 1579). Here, his past reached further into remote antiquity since he says he came to Japan with Jofuku 1800 years before, after living India for 500 years and in China for 1000 years. (Note: Recensions containing these variant details include the texts interpolated into two historical romances (gunkimono) on the Taikō, or Toyotomi Hideyoshi, the Shinsho taikōki and Taikō shinkenki)

==== Sources of Morin-ji legend ====
This legend is documented in origin-tales (engi) concerning Morinji and the tea-kettle, published in several editions by Morin-ji temple. The title Bunbuku chagama ryakuengi (分福茶釜略縁起) is borne by the earliest edition (nominally 1587, but probably dating to around the Genroku era or c. 1700) as well as later undated editions (possibly c. 1800).

The text of the later edition of Bunbuku chagama ryakuengi contains more detail (motifs), and is identical to the account found in the essay Kasshi yawa (1821–1841) by Kiyoshi Matsura.

=== Edo period fiction ===
Bunbuku chagama exist in popular fiction or kusazōshi format, from the akahon or "red book" period (late 17th to early 18th century).

One example is an edition of Bunbuku chagama printed by Urokogataya, dating to c. 1735–45. (Note: The work mentions the kabuki play Aioi-jishi, first performed in 1734.) The storyline is as follows. A monk named Bunbuku serving Lord Higashiyama in Kyoto (Note: Higashiyama-dono refers to Ashikaga Yoshimasa at his residence Jishō-ji Ginkaku.) captures an old raccoon dog (mujina) by causing the creature to lower its guard by joining the monk in dance. Bunbuku and his comrades, the four tea monks, decide to butcher the creature and make it into soup (suimono). (Note: Whereas suimono is a clear soup flavored with salt or soy sauce, tanuki-jiru recipe calls for a miso soup.) The creature flees but is cornered and turns itself into a tea kettle. The monks place the kettle on fire and are amused to see it turn halfway back into the furry creature, and it escapes. The lord hears of this incident, and declares this to be disgraceful, ordering the monks to be stripped of clothes and cast out. The old raccoon dog finds the monks and decides to stretch out the skin of its testicles and cover them up like a blanket (fusuma), by way of revenge. The monks were slightly discomfited, but when they woke up, captured the beast and presented it to their lord, and are restored to his good grace.

This Urokogata edition is considered a remake from Kondō Kiyoharu's Bunbuku chagama, dating to the Kyōhō era (1716–1736). This text follows a similar story-line except it is a fox which is imperiled with being cooked by the Higashiyama priests and turns into a tea kettle, and the fox entrusts the revenge to the raccoon dog. This work too has its precedence, a similar tale dating back to around the Enpō or Tenna eras (1673–1684), and entitled Kyō Higashiyama bake gitsune (『京東山ばけ狐』).

== In popular culture ==
An animated movie based on the tale was produced in 1928 by Yokohama Cinema Shoukai.

Passing reference to this story occurs in the animated film Pom Poko (1994, Studio Ghibli).

In the Naruto series, Shukaku, the One-Tail, who is modeled after a tanuki, is mentioned to have originally been sealed into a teapot. It is revealed later that his former jinchūriki (human container) was an old man named Bunbuku.

In Ichiro by Ryan Inzana, the legend of the tanuki teapot (chagama) is woven into a side-story of an American teenager.

During the Google Doodle Champion Island Games, one of the champions, referred either as "Tanooki" or "Tanuki", is based on the titular character of this tale.

== See also ==
- Kachi-kachi Yama, another Japanese folktale on the tanuki
