= Chagama =

Japanese kettle

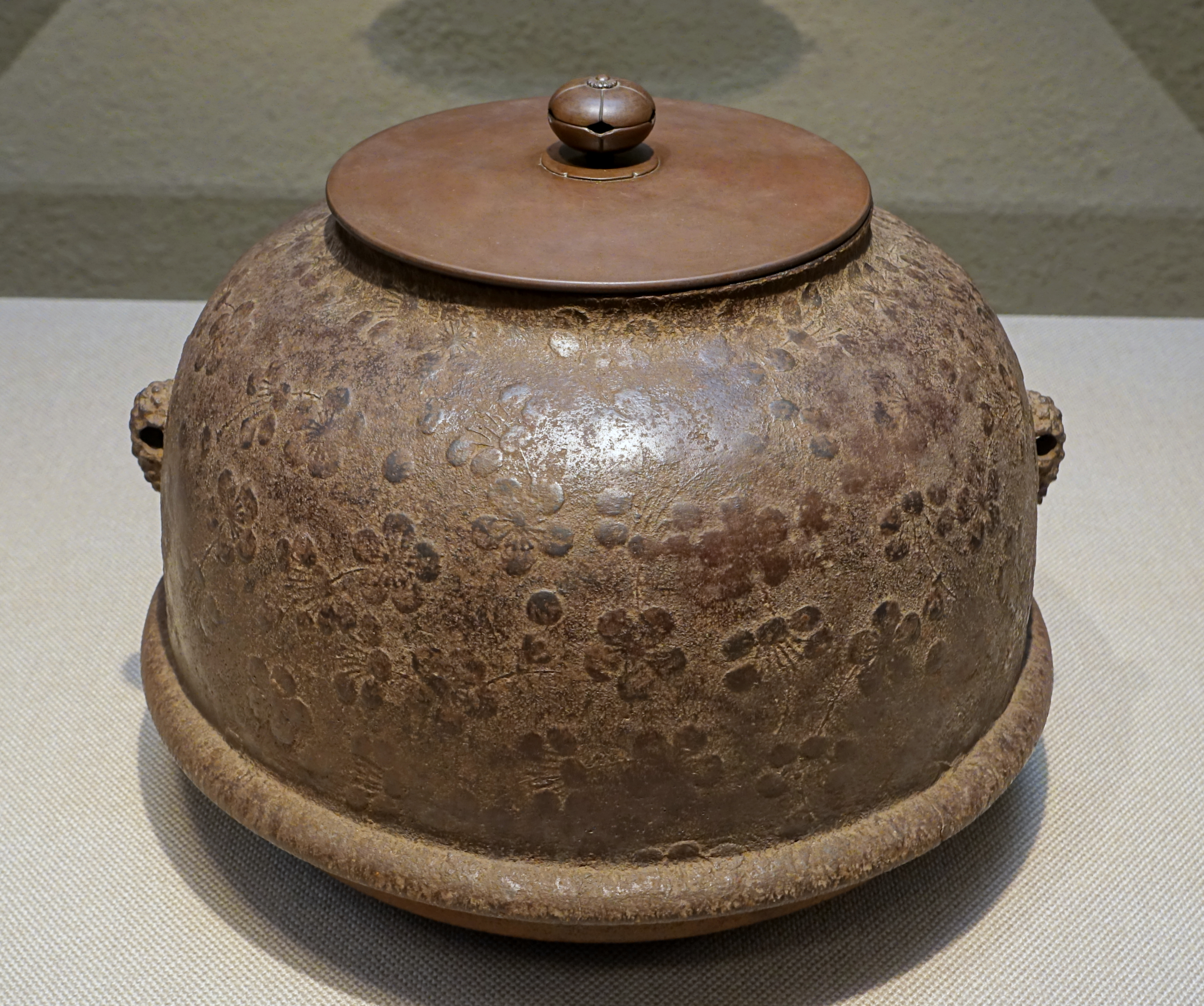
Chagama kettle with Japanese kerria design, Ashiya ware, Shinnari type, 1400s Muromachi period, iron (Registered Important Work of Art)

Chagama (kanji : 茶釜, hiragana : ちゃがま, "tea kettle") is a Japanese term referring to the metal pot or kettle used in the Japanese tea ceremony. Kama are made of cast iron, and are used to heat the water used to make tea.

== Description ==
In the tea room, the kama is either heated over a tea stove (風炉, furo) which a kind of portable brazier or in a sunken hearth (ro) built into the floor of the tea room, depending on the season.

Kama are often round or cylindrical, and have a lug on each side, for inserting metal handles called kan. These are used to carry the kama and/or hang it over the ro. Otherwise, or when using a brazier, a tripod may be used to support the kettle over the heat source (Sen, 1979, p. 22). There are also brazier sets in which the kama is designed to be used without a tripod. Kama (釜) is a Japanese term meaning metal pot or kettle. The specific term for a kama used in the Japanese tea ceremony is chagama (茶釜, "tea kettle"). Kama are made of cast iron or copper and are used to heat the water used to make tea.

The ro (sunken hearth) is used during autumn and winter when it is cold. In the Tatami flooring of the tea rooming a hole is created to put the kama in, over the fire. This hole is surrounded by a box-like frame called the robuchi (炉縁, ro frame). The Kama in such a hole will warm up faster and stay warm longer. Moreover, it provides an image of warmth during the colder seasons. In case of the ro, the incense used is called Neriko (練香), which are small kneaded balls from a mixture of woods, spices, and herbs, instead of Kouboku (香木) incense made from aromatic wood, used in spring and summer.

The furo (portable brazier) is used during spring and summer. They have a variety of shapes and the earliest ones were made of bronze but later iron and clay braziers became more common. The unglazed clay Furo coated with black lacquer was preferred for formal use. It was placed on a lacquered board to prevent heat damage. The iron type was set on a paving tile. A bed of ashes, called Hai (灰), is laid beforehand inside the furo and the sumi placed on top is lit. On the edge of a Furo a fire window or cut-out opening provides the necessary draft to keep the Sumi (charcoal) burning properly. The Kama is then set directly on the bronze or iron brazier, but a trivet is used for a clay brazier. Kama for furo are slightly smaller than those used for ro (Sen, 1979, p. 22).

The preparation ritual will be slightly different when using the ro or the furo, but the basics are the same.

== See also ==
- Bunbuku Chagama
