= Nyctereutes urartuensis =

Nyctereutes urartuensis Temporal range: Late Pliocene

Scientific classification
- Kingdom: Animalia
- Phylum: Chordata
- Class: Mammalia
- Infraclass: Placentalia
- Order: Carnivora
- Family: Canidae
- Genus: Nyctereutes
- Species: †N. urartuensis

Binomial name
- †Nyctereutes urartuensis Bartolini-Lucenti et al., 2026

Extinct species of Nyctereutes

Nyctereutes urartuensis is an extinct species of caniform carnivoran in the genus Nyctereutes that lived in Armenia during the Piacenzian stage of the Pliocene epoch.

== Etymology ==
The specific epithet urartuensis references the Iron Age Kingdom of Urartu, whose territory spanned the Caucasus, Asia Minor, and Mesopotamia.
