= Nyctereutes abdeslami =

Nyctereutes abdeslami Temporal range: Pliocene

Scientific classification
- Kingdom: Animalia
- Phylum: Chordata
- Class: Mammalia
- Order: Carnivora
- Suborder: Caniformia
- Family: Canidae
- Subfamily: Caninae
- Genus: Nyctereutes
- Species: †N. abdeslami

Binomial name
- †Nyctereutes abdeslami Geraads, 1997

Species of mammal (fossil)

Nyctereutes abdeslami is an extinct relative of the raccoon dog from the Pliocene. A jaw from the species was found in Morocco. Scientists have noticed that Nyctereutes abdeslami had much larger molars than other species of its genus, suggesting a larger body.
