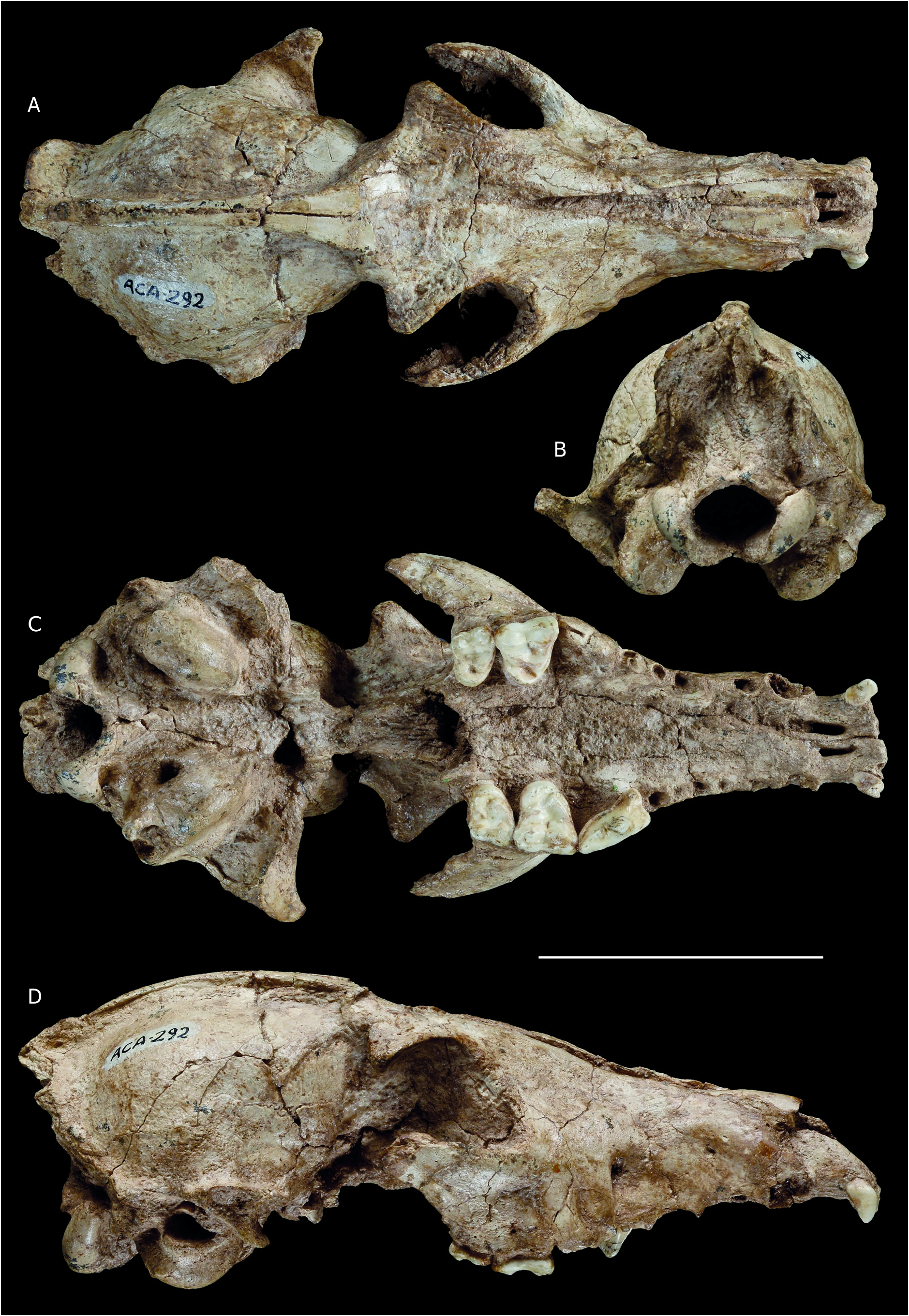
- Fossil of Nyctereutes donnezani from Çalta, central Turkey, early Pliocene
- Illustration of Nyctereutes donnezani from "History of Polish Canidae (Carnivora, Mammalia) and Their Biochronological Implications on the Eurasian Background" (Marciszak et al., Genes, 2023)

Scientific classification
- Kingdom: Animalia
- Phylum: Chordata
- Class: Mammalia
- Infraclass: Placentalia
- Order: Carnivora
- Family: Canidae
- Genus: Nyctereutes
- Species: †N. donnezani

Binomial name
- †Nyctereutes donnezani (Depéret, 1890)
- Range map

= Nyctereutes donnezani =

Nyctereutes donnezani Temporal range: Pliocene

Species of mammal

Nyctereutes donnezani is an extinct relative of the raccoon dog. It has been found in Spain, Poland, Greece, and Turkey.
