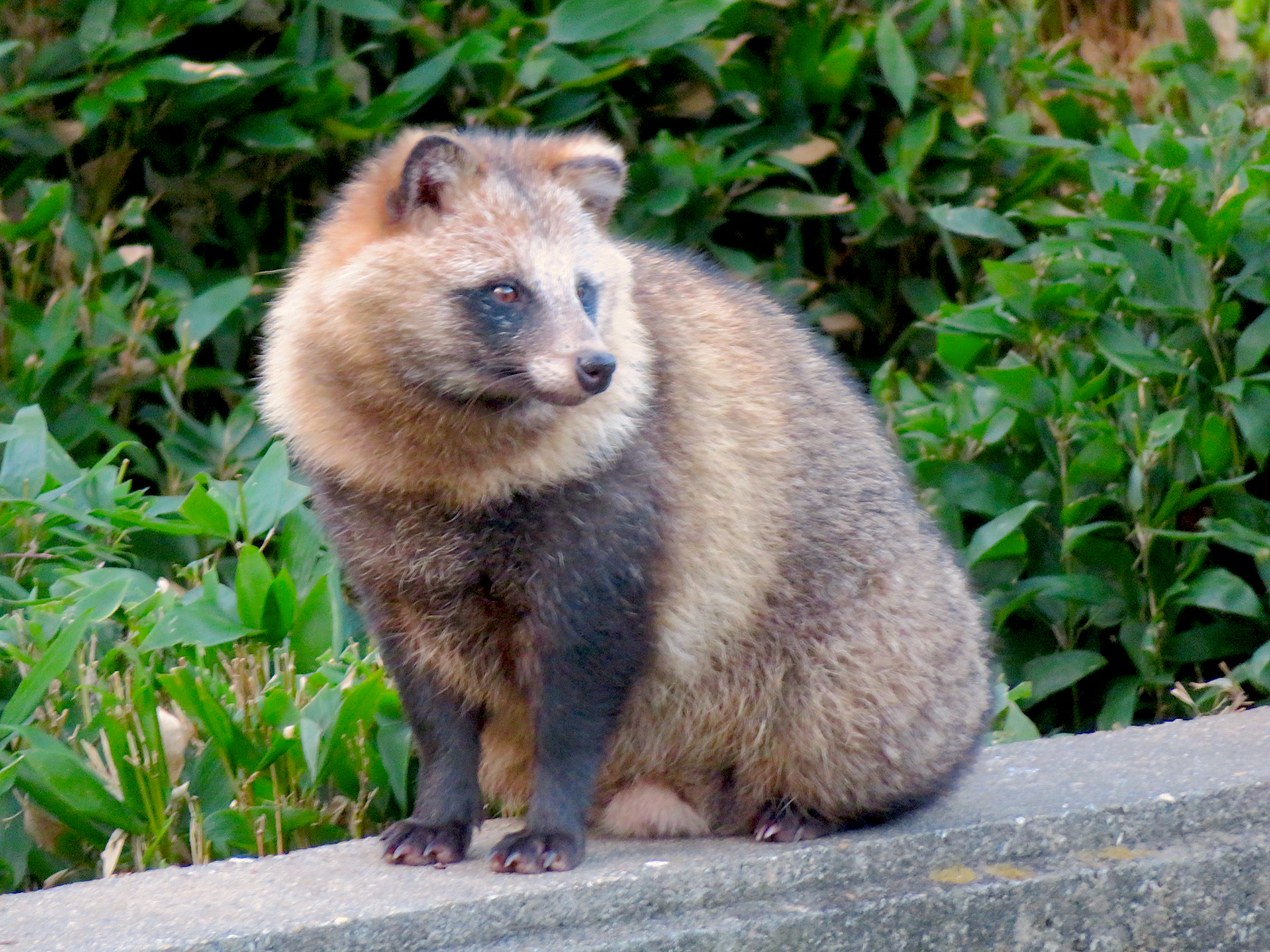
- In Higashiyama Zoo and Botanical Gardens

Conservation status
- Least Concern (IUCN 3.1)

Scientific classification
- Kingdom: Animalia
- Phylum: Chordata
- Class: Mammalia
- Order: Carnivora
- Family: Canidae
- Genus: Nyctereutes
- Species: N. viverrinus

Binomial name
- Nyctereutes viverrinus (Temminck, 1838)

Synonyms
- Nyctereutes procyonoides viverrinus

= Japanese raccoon dog =

Species of canid endemic to Japan

The Japanese raccoon dog (Nyctereutes viverrinus), also called the tanuki, is a species of canid that is endemic to Japan. It is one of two species in the genus Nyctereutes, alongside the common raccoon dog (N. procyonoides), of which it is considered to be a subspecies by some taxonomic authorities.

In Japan, raccoon dogs have had a prominent role in folklore since ancient times. They are reputedly mischievous and jolly, masters of disguise and shapeshifting, but somewhat gullible and absent-minded. The animals are common in Japanese art, particularly as statues.

== Etymology ==
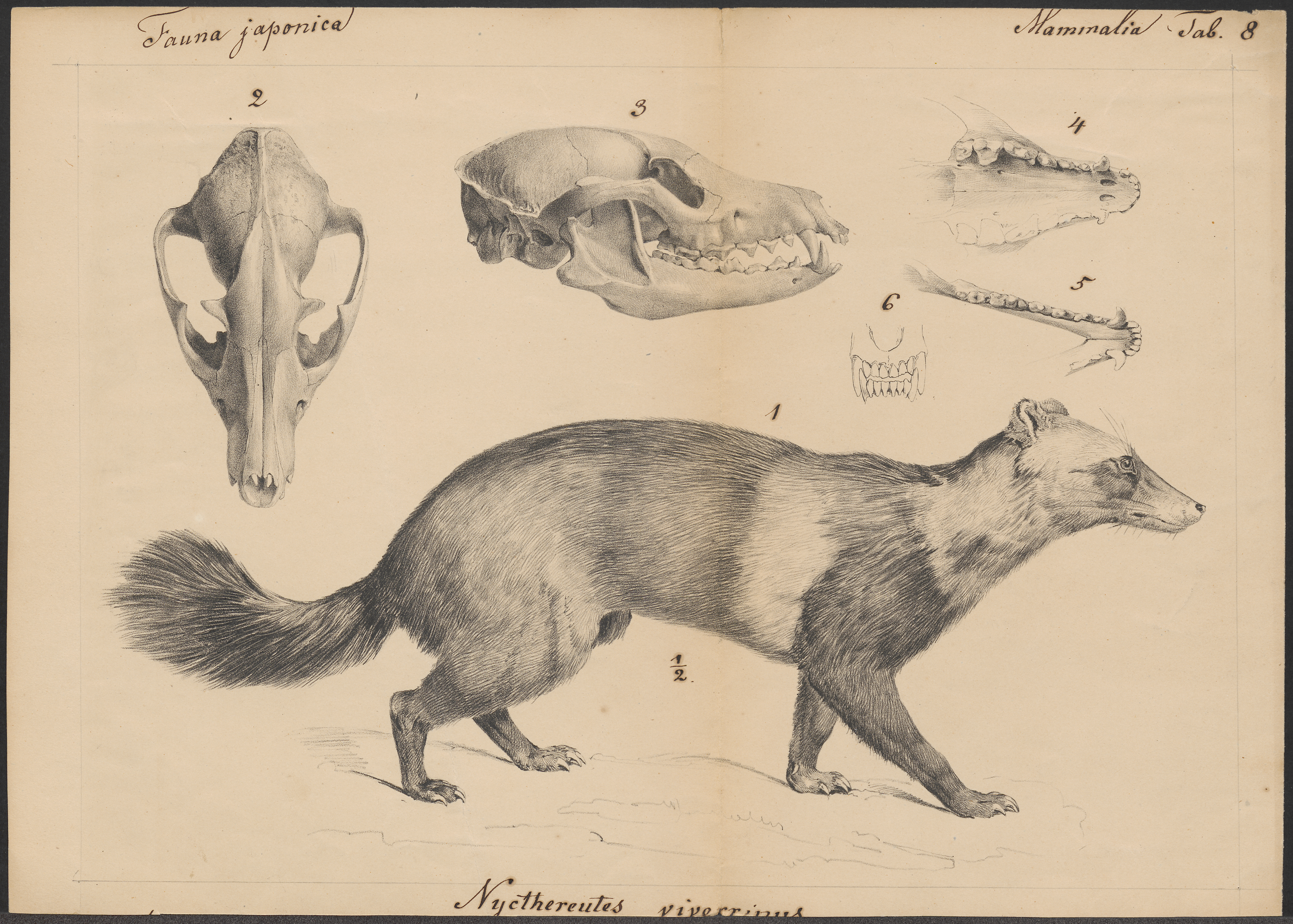
Illustration of the "Nyctéreute viverrin" (in French) in the first edition of Fauna Japonica, published in 1842.

The species was first described in Western literature by the naturalist Coenraad Jacob Temminck, based on specimens sent from Japan by Philipp Franz von Siebold during his travels in the 1820s. It was regarded as a distinct species on the basis of its fur colour. The term viverrinus refers to animals of the genus Viverra from India, to which the species bears some resemblance. A translation of this scientific name has previously appeared in English as "Viverra dog". It was later adopted in certain Western languages, such as the Italian "Cane viverrino", but most notably in the French term "Chien viverrin".

The Japanese name tanuki (タヌキ, 狸, tanuki), sometimes written "tanooki" or "tanouki", of uncertain etymology, may derive from the words taneko (田猫; "field cat"), tanoke (田之怪; "apparition of fields"), tanuki (手貫; "hand guard"), dashinuki (出し抜き; "playing dead") or tamashinuki (魂抜き; "losing one's soul"), the latter two referring to the animal's use of thanatosis as a defense mechanism.

== Description ==
The Japanese raccoon dog has a smaller stomach and shorter fur of lesser insulation value than mainland raccoon dogs. A white color type is rare. In mainland Japan, oculocutaneous albinism is caused by a mutation in the third and fifth exon of the TYR nucleotide sequence, which is responsible for melanin pigmentation.

== Behavior ==
The Japanese raccoon dog is mainly nocturnal. It vocalizes by growling or with groans that have pitches resembling those of the domesticated cat. Like the cat, its back arches to intimidate other animals. It assumes a defensive posture similar to that of other canids, showing submission by lowering its body and showing its belly.

Usually, social groups are limited to a breeding pair, but the individual Japanese raccoon dog may stay in a group of non-paired individuals until finding a mate.

The species is predominantly monogamous. The breeding period for the species is synchronized between females and males and lasts between February and April. A litter (typically with 4–6 pups) is born after a gestation period of 9 weeks. The parents look after their pups at a den for around one month, and then for another month after the pups leave the den.

Japanese raccoon dogs live for 7–8 years in the wild and have reached the age of 13 in captivity.

They have been observed climbing trees to forage for fruits and berries, using their curved claws to climb.

== Taxonomy ==
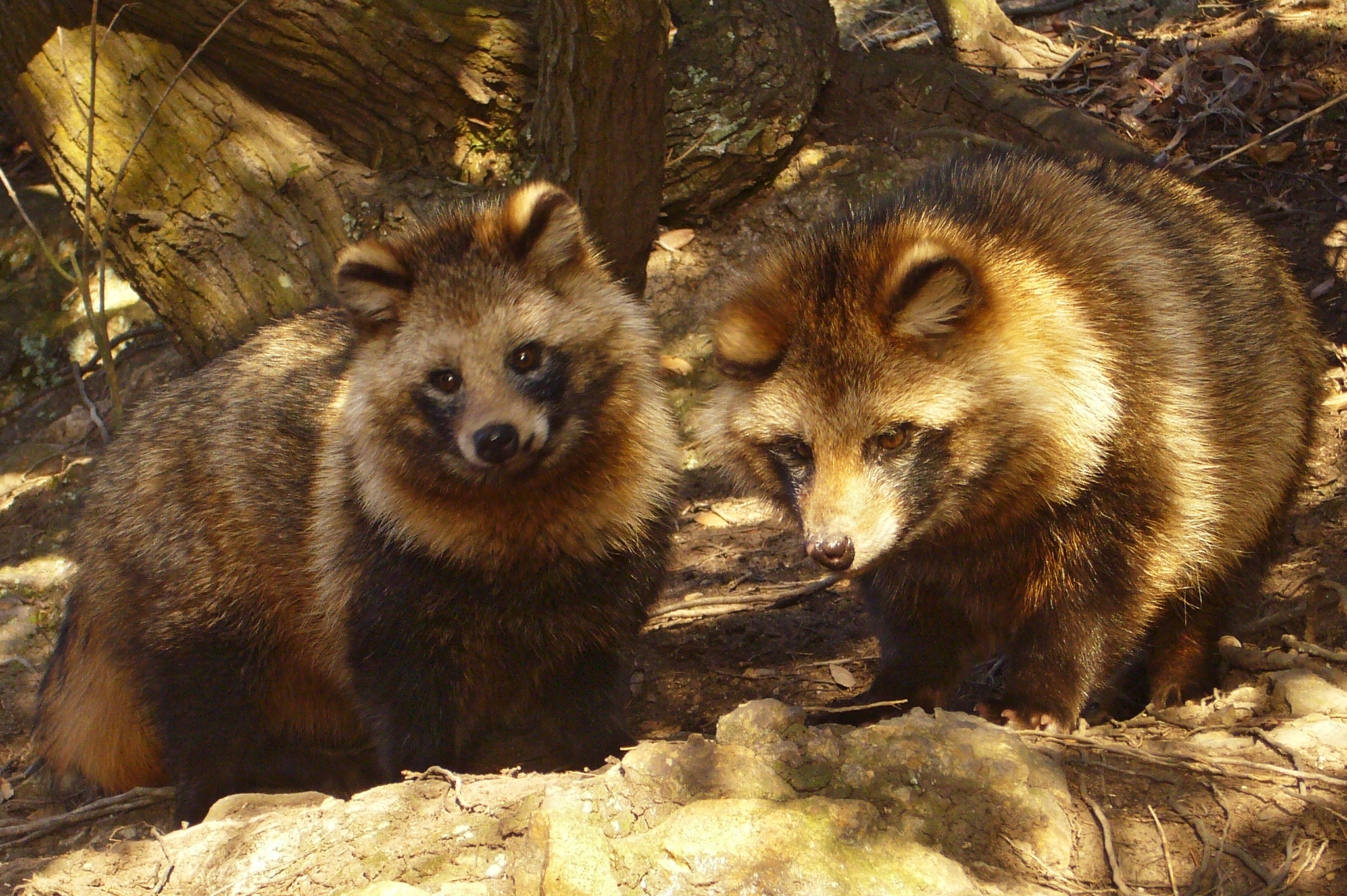
Japanese raccoon dogs at Fukuyama, Hiroshima

Several raccoon dogs are at Tobu Zoo in Saitama prefecture.

=== Ranking as a species ===
The Japanese raccoon dog is being increasingly classified as its own distinct species due to unique chromosomal, behavioral, and morphological characteristics absent in mainland raccoon dogs. Its status is still disputed, in part due to its elastic genome. Aggregators on mammal taxonomy are inconsistent on the issue. Both the IUCN Canid Group's Canid Biology and Conservation Conference (2001) and Mammal Species of the World (2005) consider the Japanese raccoon dog to be a subspecies of the common raccoon dog (N. procyonoides), whereas the American Society of Mammalogists includes N. viverrinus as a valid species in its Mammal Diversity Database.

Genetic analyses based on mtDNA and nuclear DNA show that the Japanese raccoon dog is more different from the continental raccoon dog populations than the continental populations are from each other, supporting the idea of classifying it as a distinct isolation species. The time of divergence according to mtDNA molecular clock is 0.59–0.67 million years ago (Mya), slightly older than the Y-chromosomal ZFY gene estimate of 0.19–0.46 Mya. In either case, this timing suggests that the ancestor of the Japanese raccoon dog crossed into modern-day Japan from continental regions before the last glacial period of the Pleistocene and has been isolated and adapting on its own since then.

The karyotype of Japanese raccoon dogs is also different from that of the mainland raccoon dogs, which is suggestive of their degree of isolation from each other. The Japanese raccoon dogs (2n = 38 + 3-4 B) have eight Robertsonian translocations compared to the mainland ones (2n = 54 + 2-3 B). Though it is unknown whether mainland raccoon dogs and Japanese raccoon dogs can produce fertile offspring, it is assumed that the chromosomal differences between them would have deleterious effects on the fertility of the potential offspring and this would be indicative of speciation.

=== Infraspecific taxa ===
Researchers suggest that raccoon dogs of Japan could be further divisible into separate subspecies as N. p. procyonoides and N. p. albus, but both views are controversial. The raccoon dogs from Hokkaido are sometimes recognized as the subspecies Nyctereutes viverrinus albus, a taxon that is synonymized with N. p. viverrinus in Mammal Species of the World, but comparative morphometric analysis supports recognizing the Hokkaido population as a distinct subspecific unit.

== Conservation ==
The IUCN places the raccoon dog at "least concern" status due to the animal's wide distribution in Japan and abundant population, including as an introduced species throughout northeastern Europe. In many European countries, it is legal to hunt raccoon dogs, as they are considered a harmful and invasive species. In Japan, the species is hunted mainly to prevent crop damage; however, its fur is desired for use in calligraphy brushes and was exported chiefly to the United States before the outbreak of World War II. The animal suffers a conservative estimate of up to 370,000 deaths by vehicles each year in Japan. In satoyama areas, invasive raccoons (Procyon lotor) have caused the tanuki to incorporate more fruit into its diet. Due to differences in habitat usage and diurnal activity between native tanuki and invasive raccoons, interspecies competition may be limited. In Hokkaido, a study found that invasive raccoons preferred inhabiting agricultural land at the forest periphery while tanuki preferred forest cores.

== In folklore and tradition ==
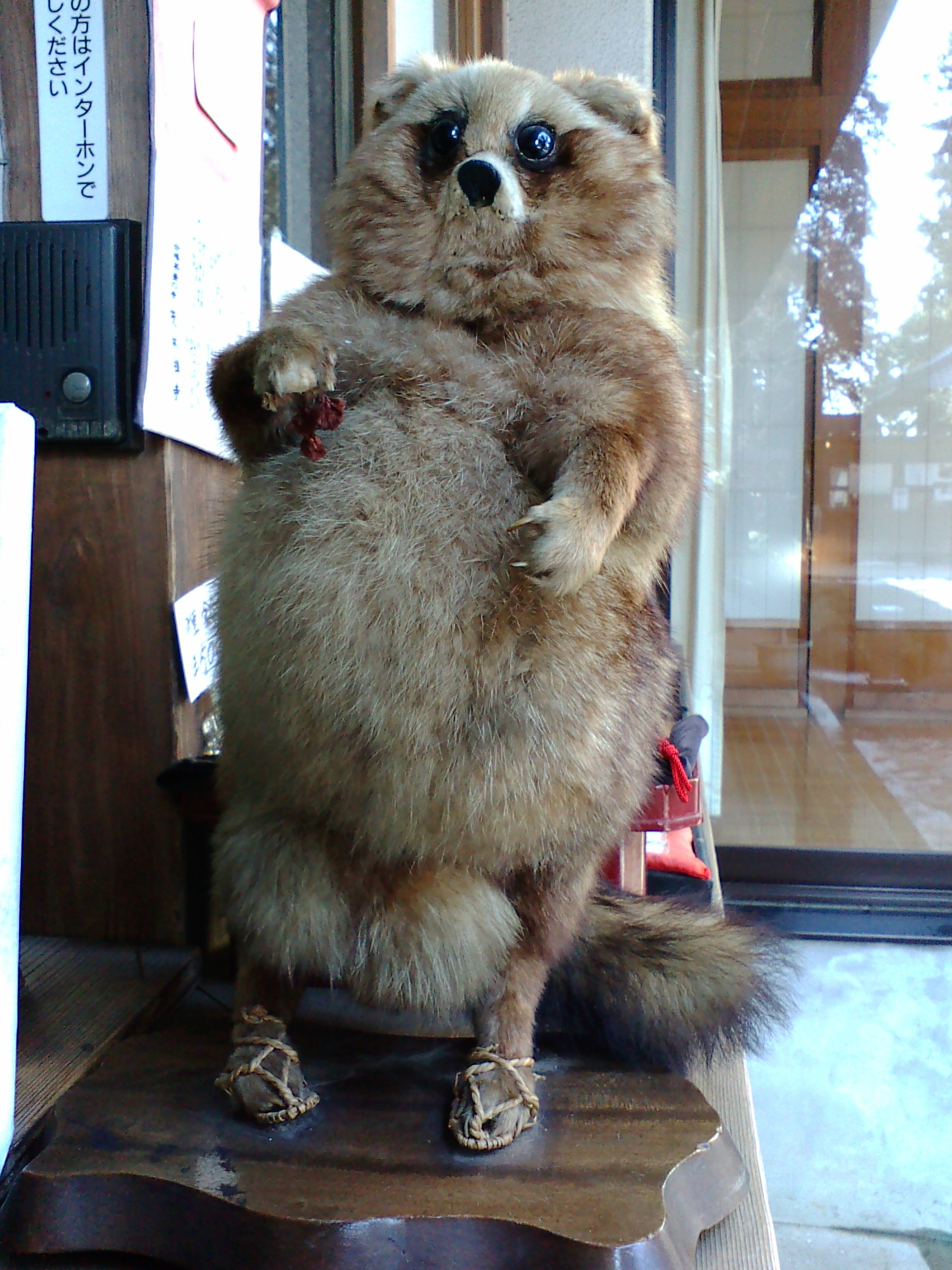
Taxidermy of a Japanese raccoon dog, wearing waraji on its feet. This tanuki is displayed in a Buddhist temple in Japan, in the area of the folktale "Bunbuku Chagama".

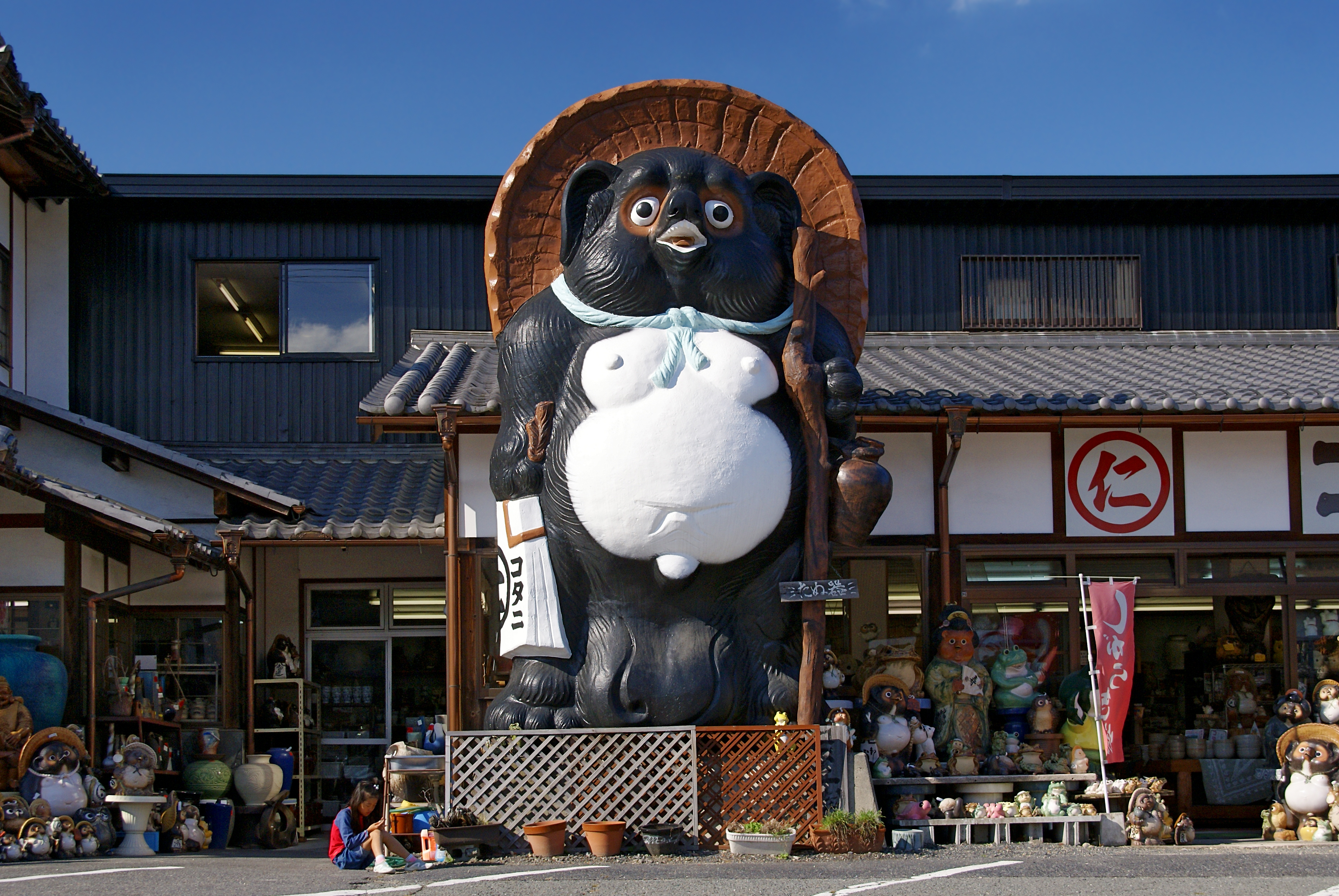
Tanuki statue at Shigaraki, Kōka, Shiga prefecture.

Raccoon dogs, known in Japanese as tanuki, have a long history in Japanese legend and folklore. Bake-danuki is a kind of supernatural being in the classics, folklore, and legends of various places in Japan.

Although the raccoon dog is a real animal, the bake-danuki that appears in literature has always been depicted as a strange or supernatural creature. Its earliest appearance in literature is in the chapter about Empress Suiko in the Nihon Shoki written during the Nara period, with such passages as "in two months of spring, there are tanuki in the country of Mutsu, they turn into humans and sing songs". Bake-danuki subsequently appear in such classics as the Nihon Ryōiki and the Uji Shūi Monogatari. In some regions of Japan, bake-danuki reputedly have abilities similar to those attributed to foxes, in that they can shapeshift into other things or people, and can possess human beings.

Many legends of raccoon dogs are from the Sado Islands of Niigata Prefecture and in Shikoku. They include the Danzaburou-danuki of Sado, the Kinchō-tanuki and Rokuemon-tanuki of Awa Province (Tokushima Prefecture), and the Yashima no Hage-tanuki of Kagawa Prefecture. The tanuki with special abilities were given names, and became the subject of rituals.

== In popular culture ==
The Japanese raccoon dog (or its folklore version bake-danuki) is a recurring theme in Japanese popular culture. The first exposure of non-Japanese to tanuki usually comes through exported Japanese media. In translation, they are often described or assumed as the raccoon.

- In Nintendo's video games, Mario can wear a Tanooki Suit with the appearance of a tanuki, so he can fly and shapeshift into an Ojizō-sama statue, much like a bake-danuki. This power-up is based on the mythology of tanuki using leaves to transform.
- The 1994 Studio Ghibli film Pom Poko features a group of tanuki using shapeshifting powers to defend their habitat against human developers.
- A running joke in the One Piece manga and anime series is that the character Tony Tony Chopper, a shape-shifting reindeer, is frequently mistaken for a tanuki by other characters. In return, he angrily corrects them that he is a "tonakai" (Japanese for "reindeer").
- The 2020 Studio Trigger TV anime BNA: Brand New Animal features main protagonist Michiru Kagemori, a humanoid shape-shifting tanuki who is often mistaken as a raccoon.
- In Nintendo's Animal Crossing video game series, Tom Nook is an anthropomorphic tanuki who operates the village store (or the Resident Services building in Animal Crossing: New Horizons).
- A shapeshifting, anthropomorphized tanuki plays a major role in Tom Robbins's novel Villa Incognito.
