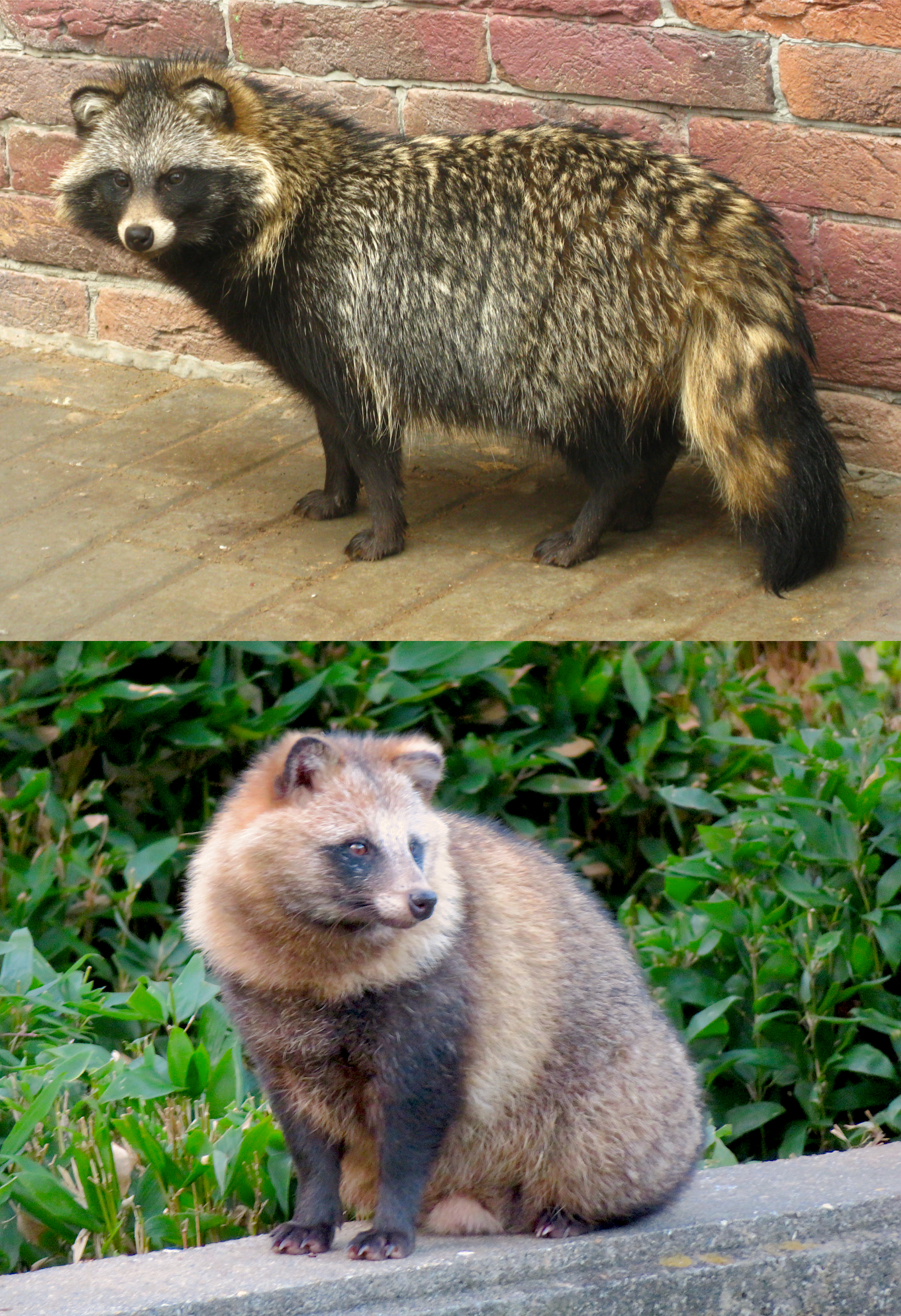
- Common and Japanese raccoon dog

Scientific classification
- Kingdom: Animalia
- Phylum: Chordata
- Class: Mammalia
- Order: Carnivora
- Family: Canidae
- Tribe: Vulpini
- Genus: Nyctereutes; Temminck, 1838

Type species
- Canis viverrinus Temminck, 1838

Species
- N. procyonoides N. viverrinus

= Nyctereutes =

Raccoon dog Temporal range: 5.332–0 Ma Late Miocene - recent

Genus of carnivores

Nyctereutes (Ancient Greek: νύξ, νυκτ- [nýx, nykt-] 'night' + ἐρέυτης [eréutēs] 'wanderer') is a genus of Asian canid with two extant species, the raccoon dogs: the common raccoon dog (Nyctereutes procyonoides) and the Japanese raccoon dog (Nyctereutes viverrinus).

Nyctereutes entered the fossil record 5.5 million years ago (Mya) in northern China. It was one of the earliest canines in the Old World. All but two species became extinct before the end of the Pleistocene. A study suggests that the evolution of Nyctereutes was influenced by environmental and climatic changes, such as the expansion and contraction of forests and the fluctuations of temperature and precipitation. The two extant species diverged around 0.5 million years ago, which is before the last glacial period of the Pleistocene.

Captive common raccoon dogs are one of the leading possibilities for the 2019 transmission of SARS-CoV-2, the virus that caused the COVID-19 pandemic, from animals to humans.

== Characteristics ==
They are typically recognized by their short snouts, round crania and the shaping of their molars, specifically the ratio between M1 and M2. Nyctereutes is considered mainly an opportunistic carnivore, feeding on small mammals, fish, birds, and insects, alongside occasional plants, specifically roots. Their diet is mostly influenced by environmental factors. Japanese raccoon dogs are considered distinct from the mainland species because of the larger skull size found in Russian and Hokkaido raccoon dogs and molecular divergence.

== Taxonomy ==
The following cladogram is based on figures by Lindblad-Toh et al., 2005:

Nyctereutes within Canidae
- Canidae
  - - - - Vulpes
        - Nyctereutes
      - Otocyon
    - - Cerdocyonina
      - Canina
  - Urocyon

=== Extant species ===
Genus Nyctereutes – Temminck, 1838 – two species
Common name	Scientific name and subspecies	Range	Size and ecology	IUCN status and estimated population
Common raccoon dog	Nyctereutes procyonoides (Gray, 1834) Four subspecies: N. p. procyonoides; N. p. koreensis; N. p. orestes; N. p. ussuriensis	Mongolia, Russian Far East, China, Korea, Vietnam; introduced to Europe	Size: Habitat: Diet:	LC
Japanese raccoon dog	Nyctereutes viverrinus (Temminck, 1838)	Japan	Size: Habitat: Diet:	LC

=== Extinct species ===
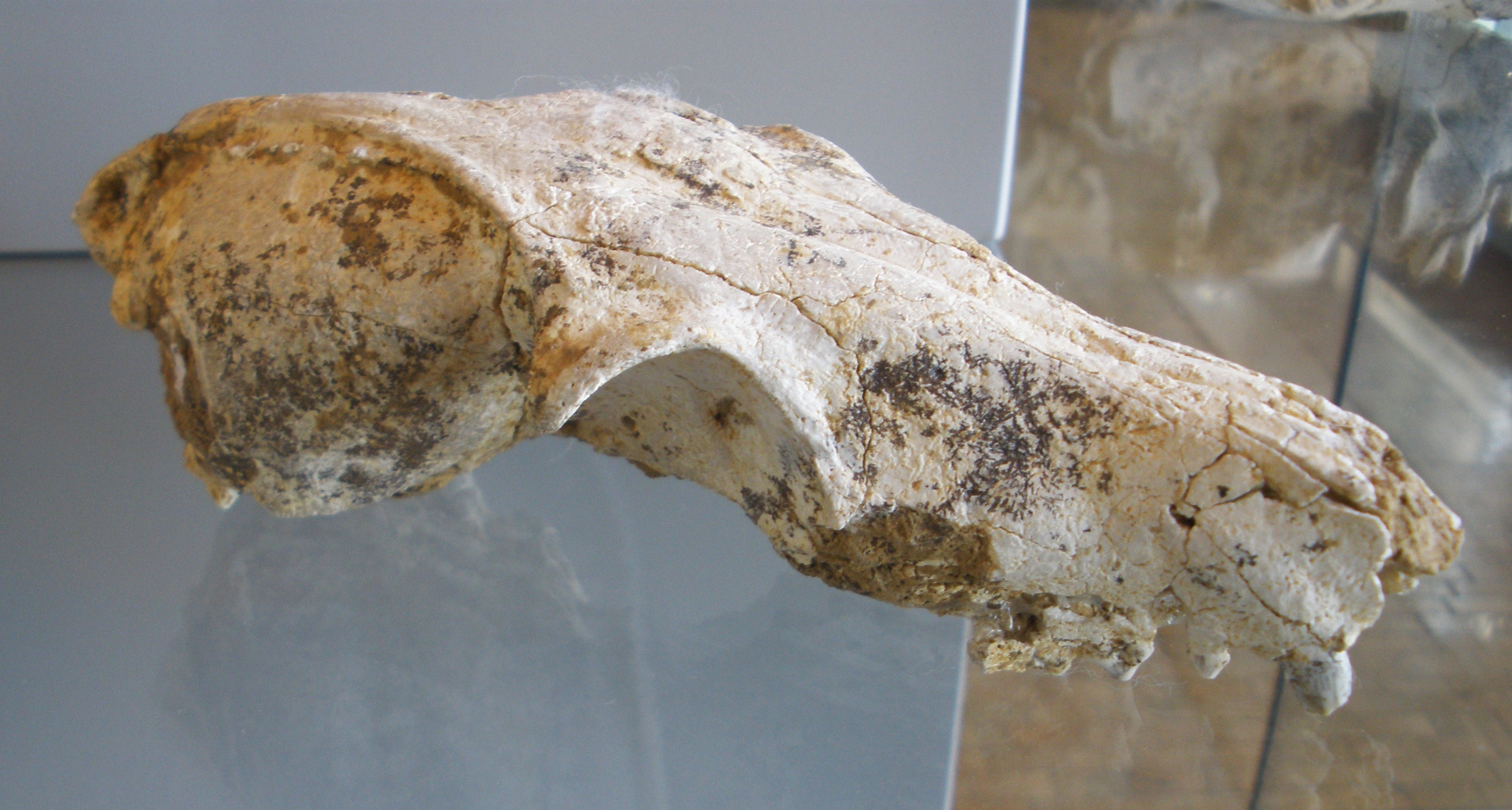
Nyctereutes megamastoides fossil skull

- †Nyctereutes abdeslami 3.6—1.8 Mya (Morocco)
- †Nyctereutes donnezani 9.0—3.4 Mya (Eastern Europe, Spain)
- †Nyctereutes lockwoodi 3.42—3.2 Mya (Ethiopia)
- †Nyctereutes megamastoides (Europe)
- †Nyctereutes sinensis 3.6 Mya—781,000 years ago (Eastern Asia)
- †Nyctereutes tingi
- †Nyctereutes urartuensis
- †Nyctereutes vinetorum
