= Odori =

Odori may refer to:

- Odori, a Japanese traditional dance
- Odori ebi (sometimes just called odori): sushi prawns that are alive and still moving when served.
- The title of second album by Japanese jazz fusion band Hiroshima.
- Ōdōri Station, a major subway interchange station in Sapporo

Odori can also refer to

- Bon Odori, meaning simply "Bon dance" is an event held during Bon Festival, the Japanese Buddhist holiday to honor the departed spirits of one's ancestors.
- Awa Odori, a traditional Japanese dance from Tokushima also a feature of the Koenji Awa Odori festival in Koenji, Suginami, Tokyo which takes place on the last weekend in August each year.
- Kasa Odori, dance with paper umbrellas performed at Tottori City's Shan-shan festival.
