= Aibahama Park =

Park in Tokushima City, Japan

Coordinates: 34°04′27″N 134°32′49″E

- 藍場浜公園
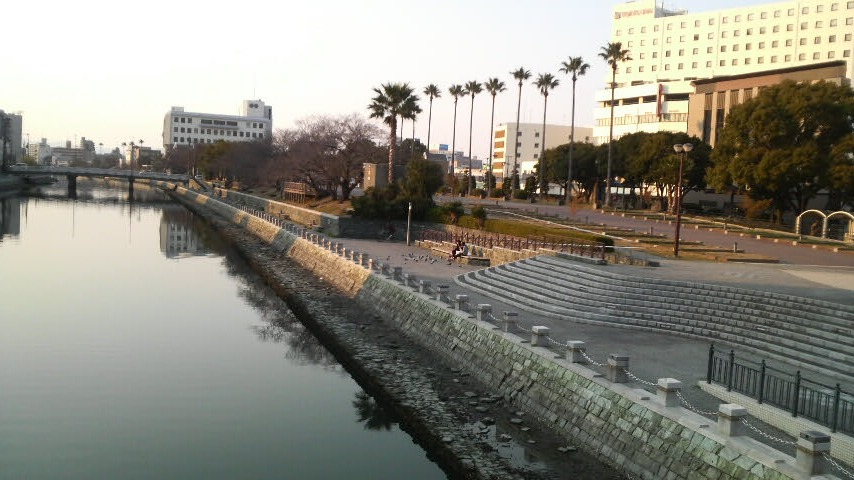
- The park seen from near the Shinmachi River
- Interactive map of Aibahama Park
- Type: General Parks
- Location: Japan; Aiba-cho, Tokushima City, Tokushima Prefecture

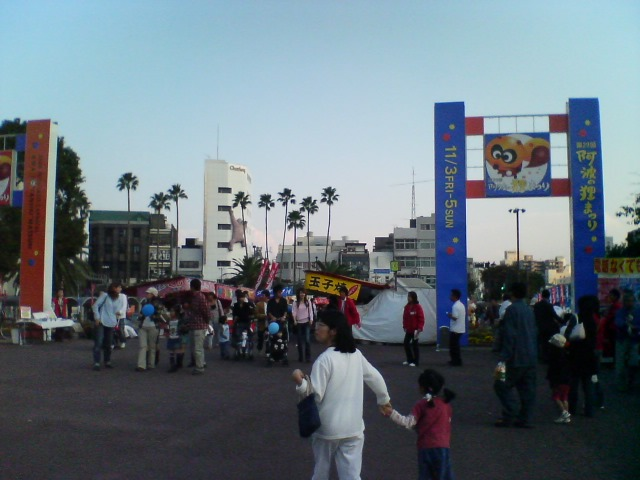
The grounds for the Awa no Tanuki Festival （November 5, 2006）

Aibahama Park (藍場浜公園) is a park in Aiba-cho in Tokushima City in Tokushima Prefecture.

== Overview ==
Found alongside the Shinmachi River that winds its way through the middle of Tokushima City, the Aibahama Park grounds are known as a popular place for events. In April there is the Hana Haru Festa, and the grounds are also used for one of the dancing stages in Awa Odori held during O-bon. The park is the location for fireworks during Suito Festival. Aibahama Park is also used during the local Awa no Tanuki Festival in November each year and is the permanent home for the Tokushima Arts Foundation for Culture.

- Local buildings / facilities - Tokushima Sogo、Tokushima CITY、Poppo-gai、Tokushima Press

== Facilities on the grounds ==
- The Tokushima Arts Foundation for Culture
- The Shinmachi River

== Access ==
- Five minutes walk from the JR Tokushima Station and bus terminal area.
