= Tokino (disambiguation) =

Tokino may refer to:

- Tokino Minoru, a Japanese racehorse
- Tokino Minoru Kinen, alternative name for the Kyodo Tsushin Hai
- Tokino Sora, a Hololive Japanese VTuber
