= Masaichi Nagata =

Japanese film producer

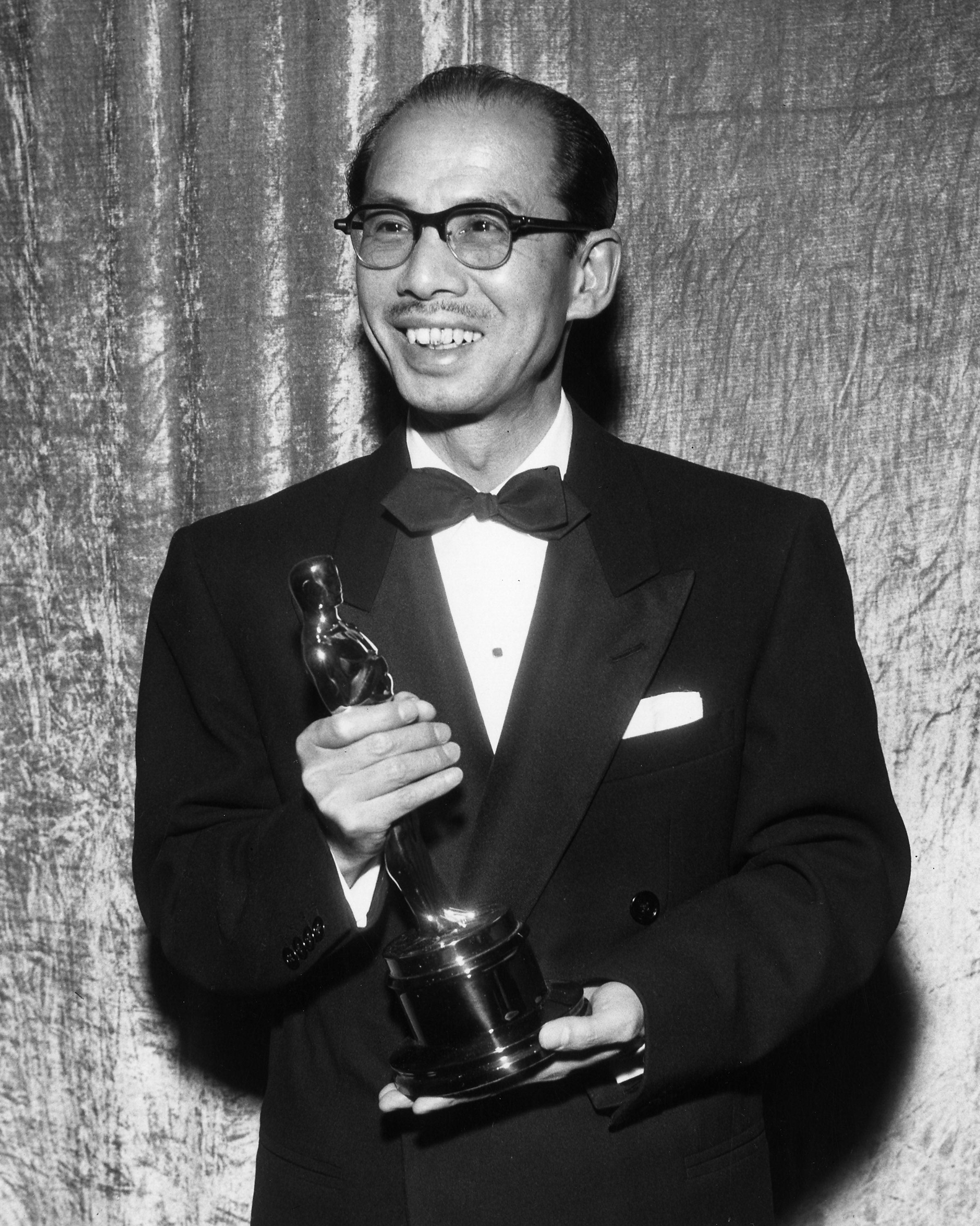
- Nagata at the 27th Academy Awards
- Born: 21 January 1906; Kyoto, Japan
- Died: 24 October 1985 (aged 79); Tokyo, Japan
- Occupations: Daiei president, film producer, baseball executive
- Years active: 1925–1980
- Children: 2
- Baseball career

Member of the Japanese

Baseball Hall of Fame
- Induction: 1988

Masaichi Nagata (永田 雅一, Nagata Masaichi; 21 January 1906 – 24 October 1985) was a Japanese businessman, film producer, race horse owner, and a professional baseball team owner. He served as president of Daiei Film and was the self-proclaimed creator of the kaiju Gamera, and was also the owner of the Chiba Lotte Marines-predecessor Daiei Stars, and the first president of the Pacific League.

== Overview ==
Masaichi Nagata was a prominent businessman among variety of fields in life. His achievements to contribute in the golden era of Japanese film industries granted a title "Father of the cinema" (Japanese: 映画界の父, Hepburn: Eigakai no Chichi) in Japan, (Note: Not to confuse with Shōzō Makino, who was known as "Father of the Japanese film" (Japanese: 日本映画の父, Hepburn: Nihon Eiga no Chichi). Nagata's relationships with Shōzō and the Makino Family became a stepping stone for Masaichi's entry into the film industry.) while his well-known nicknames "Nagata Trumpet" (Japanese: 永田ラッパ, Hepburn: Nagata Rappa) and "Fixer of the political world" (Japanese: 政界の黒幕, Hepburn: Seikai no Kuromaku) were given due to his boasting behaviors and connections with political circles. He had additional nicknames "Movie Demon" (Japanese: 映画の鬼, Hepburn: Eiga no Oni) and "The Last Activist" (Japanese: 最後の活動屋, Hepburn: Saigo no Katsudōya).

Either Masaichi or Hideo Matsuyama, the inventor of the "Silver Week", was also the inventor of the advertising slogan "Golden Week".

He had never married in life, yet had engaged in multiple love affairs and had biological children and grandchildren. One of his alleged mistresses was the actress Machiko Kyō. He had a particularly close lover who was a student of odori dance under the actor/comedian Yukitarō Hotaru. She had introduced Yukitarō to Nagata, and Yukitarō's apprentice Yukijirō Hotaru (Note: Yukijirō appeared in the Heisei Gamera trilogy due to Yukitarō's involvement in Gamera vs. Gyaos.) believed she was the actual spouse of Nagata.

His biological and non-biological relatives include Hidemasa Nagata (son), a film and television producer Mamoru Nagata (grandson), Masashi Nagata (grandson) who is the current chairman of Nagata Kikaku founded by Masaichi, a businessman Masao Nagata (great-grandson) known as the YouTuber "Nagata Trumpet", Ichikawa Raizō VIII's wife Masako Ōta (adopted daughter), and his nephew-in-law Masayuki Tayayama is the first professional taiko player in Japan.

== Careers ==
=== Early life ===
Masaichi was born into a ton'ya for yūzen and dye in Kyoto, however his family underwent misfortunes since when Masaichi was three-years-old, and eventually fell apart; loss of the factory by a fire, an elopement by a kozō (employee) and a jochū (housemaid) who stole money when they escaped, and the bankruptcy due to his father being a joint guarantor of his friend. Masaichi attempted to became a kozō for one of his relatives (an executive director of Tokyo Stock Exchange) to reconstruct the family for his parents. To gain a sufficient educational attainment, he attended the Ōkura College of Commerce (now Tokyo Keizai University), however lost his father due to an intracranial hemorrhage and dropped out the school in despair. As a member of a local seinendan (youth voluntary groups for social contributions), he diligently contributed in the cleaning of damaged cites following the Great Kantō Earthquake, and subsequently returned to Kyoto.

Nagata was gradually influenced by socialism due to his admire for heroism, and joined a local yakuza Senbongumi afterwards. He, along with Jun Okamoto, became one of apprentices of Suezaburō Sasai, (Note: Suezaburō was the third son of Sanzaemon who was widely known for his stance as a yakuza (so called "katagi yakuza") with a regular occupation and not engaging in any gamblings, the head of Senbongumi. Suezaburo was the last head of the yakuza, and eventually dissolved the group. "Aratora Senbongumi", a yakuza syndicate indirectly involved in the Kominto Incident, was derived from the Senbongumi.) while Nagata defended Suezaburō and his father and the crime boss Sanzaemon; Sanzaemon was a renowned kyōkaku known as the ""Fierce Tiger" (Japanese: 荒虎, Hepburn: Aratora)", and Nagata claimed Sanzaemon definitely not being an actual yakuza, and Suezaburō was the 10th highest taxpayer in Kyoto back then. However, Masaichi's mother strongly deplored the fact that her son became a subject of surveillance by the police, and she expelled Masaichi from the family.

- It was not uncommon for yakuza syndicates to have connections with show business and entertainment industries, including the below-mentioned Japan Pro Wrestling Alliance, so as the Sasai family. The three (Nagata and Okamoto and Suezaburō) later joined those industries, where Nagata and Okamoto subsequently co-worked in Daiei Film, and various notable filmmakers and actors later emerged under Suezaburō.

=== Film industry ===
He joined the Nikkatsu studio in 1925 due to his relationships with the aforementioned Shōzō Makino and the Makino Family, and after working as a location manager, rose to become head of production at the Daiei Kyoto studio. As a fledgling handyman, Nagata was noticed for his eloquence and social skills, and was favored by notable figures (such as Yoshirō Fujimura, Nobuo Asaoka, Mochizuki Keisuke, and so on), and developed a relationship with the political world. Experiencing conflicts with the Nikkatsu president, he left the company in 1934, taking many Nikkatsu stars with him, to form Daiichi Eiga. While short-lived, that studio created such masterpieces as Kenji Mizoguchi's Sisters of the Gion (1936) and Osaka Elegy (1936).

When Daiichi Eiga folded, Nagata became head of the Kyoto studio of Shinkō Kinema until the government reorganized the industry during World War Two. Against a government plan to combine the fiction film companies into two studios, Nagata fought hard for the alternative option of creating a third studio. His efforts resulted in the creation of the Daiei Motion Picture Company, where he first served as an executive. He rose to become president in 1947 and, apart from a brief period when he was purged by Occupation authorities, remained in that position until 1971.

Under his reign, Daiei produced Akira Kurosawa's Rashomon (1950) and entered it in the Venice Film Festival, where it won the grand prize and became the first Japanese film to win an international award, thus introducing Japanese cinema to the world. Nagata also spurred the production of Teinosuke Kinugasa's Gate of Hell (1953), the first Japanese color film to be shown abroad, earning both an honorary Academy Award for Best Foreign Language Film and the Palme d'Or at the Cannes Film Festival. Nagata also produced such renowned films as Mizoguchi's Ugetsu (1953) and Sansho the Bailiff (1954), as well as Jokyo (1960) which was entered into the 10th Berlin International Film Festival. On the popular front, Nagata's Daiei was also known for such successful film series as the Zatoichi films starring Shintaro Katsu, the Sleepy Eyes of Death series featuring Raizō Ichikawa, and the Gamera movies. In the early 1950s, Nagata attempted to export Japanese films to obtain foreign currencies for the post-war reconstruction of the Japanese economy; his later efforts to save the declining Japanese cinema resulted in the establishment of a governmental association to export Japanese films and to support productions of kaiju and tokusatsu genres in particular for foreign currencies. For the Gamera franchise, Nagata produced the second film Gamera vs. Barugon, with the remainder of the Showa Gamera films produced instead by his son Hidemasa Nagata.

However, Daiei Film's business model had a weak foundation due to multiple factors, including Nagata's imprudent managements, and Daiei particularly suffered significant decline among the eroding film industry, and it eventually went bankrupt in 1971. On the other hand, Nagata continued as an independent producer for some years after that. He produced more than 160 films during his career.

=== Disney-related businesses ===
Nagata was also known for his friendship with Walt Disney where Disney called him a "brother"; Nagata became an avid fan of the Disneyland and subsequently assumed the presidency of the Disney Japan. He had also associated in other Disney-related businesses such as domestic distributions and dubbings of Disney films by Daiei, publication of Bambi, a Life in the Woods, (Note: The 2006 film Gamera the Brave was also an homage to Bambi, a Life in the Woods.) promotion of the Tokyo Disneyland, construction of the Nara Dreamland (which also affected the opening of the Yokohama Dreamland), and so on. Nagata also established Daiei's department of western films due to influences from Disney, and had started distributing foreign films. Additionally, he produced a documentary film White Mountains (白い山脈, Shiroi Sanmyaku) as he was inspired by Walt Disney Productions' True-Life Adventures series.

=== Baseball ===
During the age when many Japanese film studios owned professional baseball teams, Nagata served as owner first of the Daiei Stars, and then of the Daimai Orions when the Stars merged with the Mainichi Orions in 1958. He promoted the two-league system, helped build Tokyo Stadium, and became the first president of the Pacific League in Japan. He was inducted into the Japanese Baseball Hall of Fame in 1988.

=== Miscellaneous ===
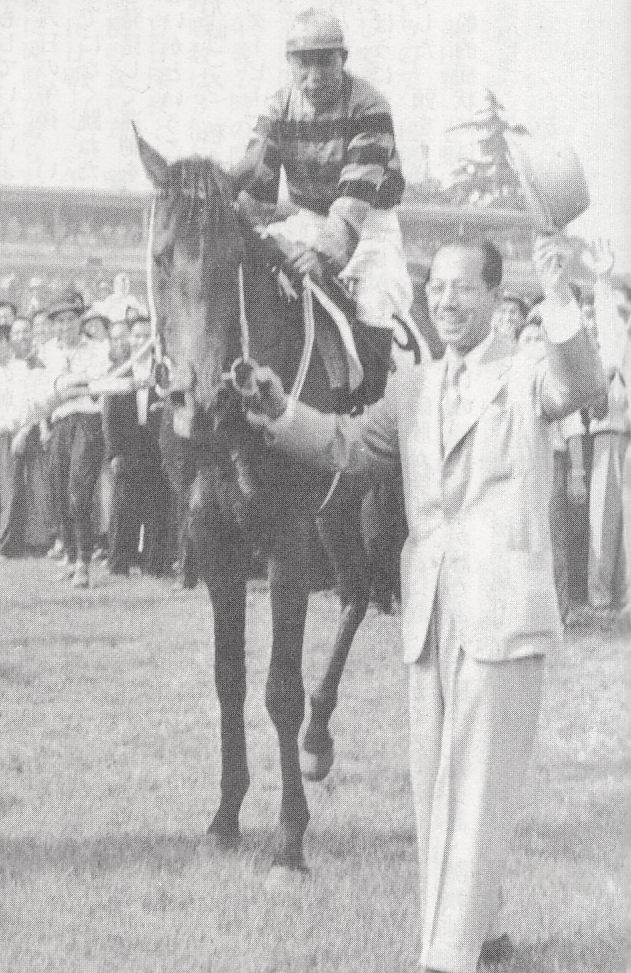
Masaichi with Tokino Minoru, one of his renowned racehorses.

Masaichi had engaged in various other businesses most notably horse racing. He began owning horses in 1934, and owned several notable horses such as Yamaichi, a foal of Kurifuji, Toast, the mare of Lucky Ruler, Otemon, and Tokino Minoru; Masaichi later produced the 1955 drama film The Phantom Horse based on the life of Tokino Minoru. Masaichi later became the second president of the Tokyo Racehorse Owners' Association, and contributed in the establishment of the Japan Racing Association as a commissioner.

Nagata's competence for managements were also demonstrated in his performances as the first president and a temporal manager of the sports newspaper Tokyo Sports (due to his connection with Yoshio Kodama) to make it into a major national daily, as the business delegate and the owner of Pepsi-Cola Company in Japan, as a sodanyaku of the Japan Pro Wrestling Federation, and as a commissioner (jp) of the Japan Sumo Association.

Nagata was also a patronage of Schools of the Sacred Heart in Japan (jp), and contributed in its expansion notably by contriving resources through managing the palace of the Kuni-no-miya house.

Nagata also became an influential figure on political circles and was regarded as a political fixer. Nagata used his connections with the political world to establish The Japanese Film Export Promotion Association (Japanese: 日本映画輸出振興協会, Hepburn: Nihon Eiga Yusyutsu Shinkō Kyōkai), a governmental incorporated association to support declining Japanese film industries due to a recession of Japanese economy and the prosperity of television industries, however his position also made him as one of 14 suspects for the corruption of the Bushu Railway (jp), however five of them including Nagata were eventually acquitted.

Due to influences from his mother, Masaichi himself became an enthusiastic Buddhist of Nichiren-shū. He was also an influential figure and became the representative of worshippers (jp), and Kazuo Hasegawa and Futabayama Sadaji were two of his attendants. Masaichi declared producing films theming the life of Nichiren is his lifework; he produced Nichiren and the Great Mongol Invasion (1958) and Nichiren (1979), and a number of worshippers of Nichiren-shū were appointed for the latter.

== Legacy ==
The 2015 novel Holy Beast War Chronicle: White Shadow (聖獣戦記 白い影, Seijū Senki – Shiroi Kage) was a tribute to Masaichi, which themed Gamera and Nichiren and the Mongol invasions of Japan and set Nichiren as the current summoner of the "Black Tortoise" (Gamera).

The aforementioned actor Yukijirō Hotaru played Nagano, a character based on Masaichi in the 2020 biopic film Nezura 1964, which focused on the production of Giant Horde Beast Nezura (jp), the scrapped predecessor of Gamera, the Giant Monster.

== Selected filmography ==
- Sisters of the Gion (1936)
- Osaka Elegy (1936)
- Rashomon (1950)
- Miss Oyu (1951)
- Tetsu no tsume (1951) aka Claws of Steel
- The Tale of Genji (1951)
- Ugetsu (1953) aka Tales of Ugetsu
- Gate of Hell (1953)
- Sansho the Bailiff (1954)
- The Crucified Lovers (1954)
- Princess Yang Kwei-Fei (1955)
- The Phantom Horse (1955)
- Shin Heike Monogatari (1955)
- Warning from Space (1956)
- Street of Shame (1956)
- Zangiku monogatari (1956)
- Suzakumon (1957)
- The Loyal 47 Ronin (1958)
- The Snowy Heron (1958)
- Enjō (1958)
- Floating Weeds (1959)
- Fires on the Plain (1959)
- Odd Obsession (1959)
- Jokyo (1960)
- Her Brother (1960)
- An Actor's Revenge (1963)
- Gamera (1965)
- The Hoodlum Soldier (1965)
- Shiroi Kyotō (1966)
- Gamera vs. Barugon (1966)
- Daimajin trilogy (1966)
- Zatoichi the Outlaw (1967)
- Manhunt (1976)
- Nichiren (1979)

== Awards ==
- Kikuchi Kan Prize (1954)
- Japanese Medal of Honor with purple ribbon (1955)
- Ordre des Arts et des Lettres (1961)
- Japanese Medal of Honor with blue ribbon (1966)
- Japanese Baseball Hall of Famer (1988)

== Bibliography ==
- Nagata, Masaichi (1953). Eigadō masshigura. Tokyo: Surugadai Shobō.
- Nagata, Masaichi (1957). Eiga jigakyō. Tokyo: Heibon Shuppan.
