= Hana Haru Festa =

Annual festival in Tokushima, Japan

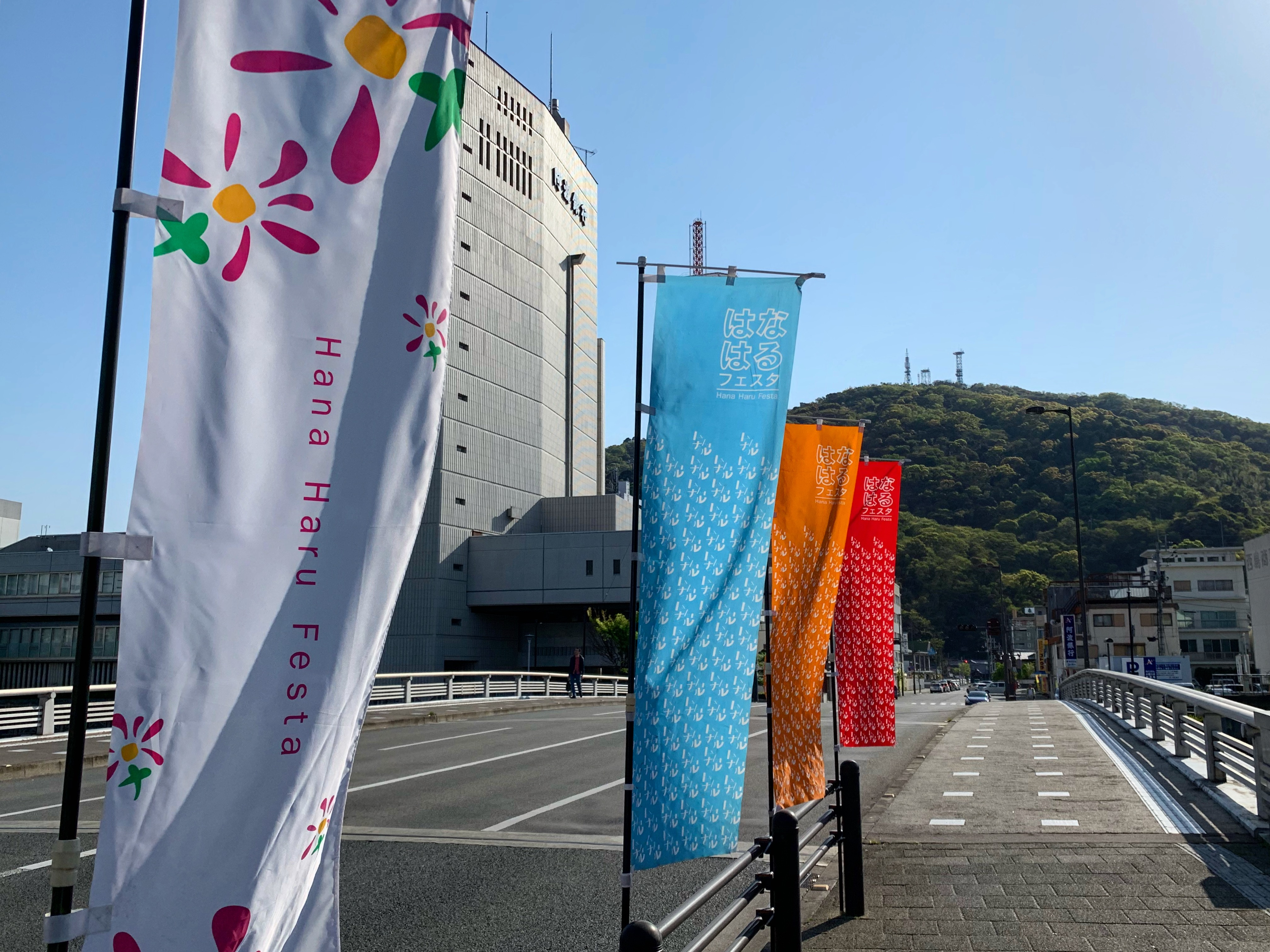
The Hana Haru Festival banners

The Hana Haru Festival Japanese: Hana Haru Festa (はな・はる・フェスタ) is a large-scale event held each year in April in the Aibahama Park in Shinmachi Riverside, Tokushima City, Tokushima Prefecture.

Each year celebrities such as the members of Chatmonchy, Under Graph and DEPAPEPE are invited to make appearances, and many of the famous Awa Odori dancing troupes perform displays.

Events include ramen road, Awa dance, traditional craft workshops where one can make paper or pottery for free, street dancing contests, concerts, and battle of the bands.
