= Awa no Tanuki Festival =

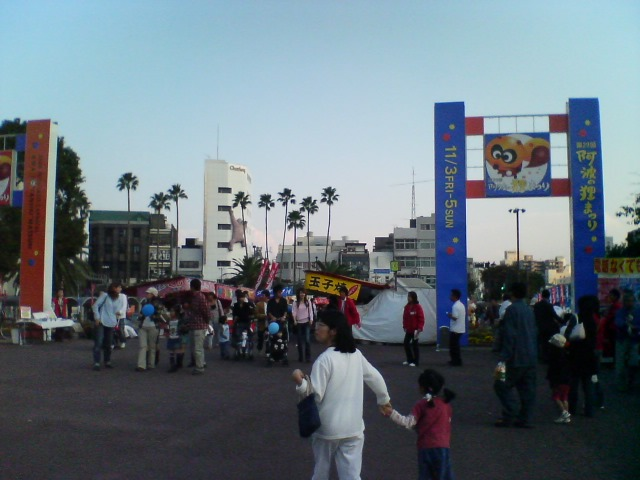
Grounds for the Awa no Tanuki Festival in Aibahama Park, Tokushima City (November 5, 2006)

The Awa no Tanuki Festival (阿波の狸まつり) is a festival held each year in early November in Tokushima City, Tokushima Prefecture.

== Overview ==
The Awa no Tanuki festival was first started in 1978 with the aims of promoting local culture, and has since grown into Tokushima's main Autumn festival. In 2006, the event saw good weather for all three days it was held, and the coincidence with a public holiday drew over 260,000 visitors. This is roughly the same size as the population of Tokushima City.

While the festival is popularly known as the 'Tanuki Festival', Tokushima has been home to many tales of the tanuki since long past. Several of these tales talk of the interaction between tanuki and the local town residents, with the tanuki often acting as positive, changing forces. It should come as no surprise, then, that the tanuki was chosen as a symbol to energise local culture in this way.

At current, the event's main grounds are the Aibahama Park grounds in Tokushima City, and the Tokushima Arts Foundation for Culture becomes a place for sale of local regional produce from around the prefecture. Several of the large industries in Tokushima hold events over the three days of the festival, and special stages are open for karaoke competitions, Awa Odori, Awa Puppet Theatre and other local cultural traditions as well. The festival is particularly popular with children.

The festival is officially run by the 'Furusato Carnival Executive Committee', but receives large assistance from the prefecture.
