= Shinmachi River =

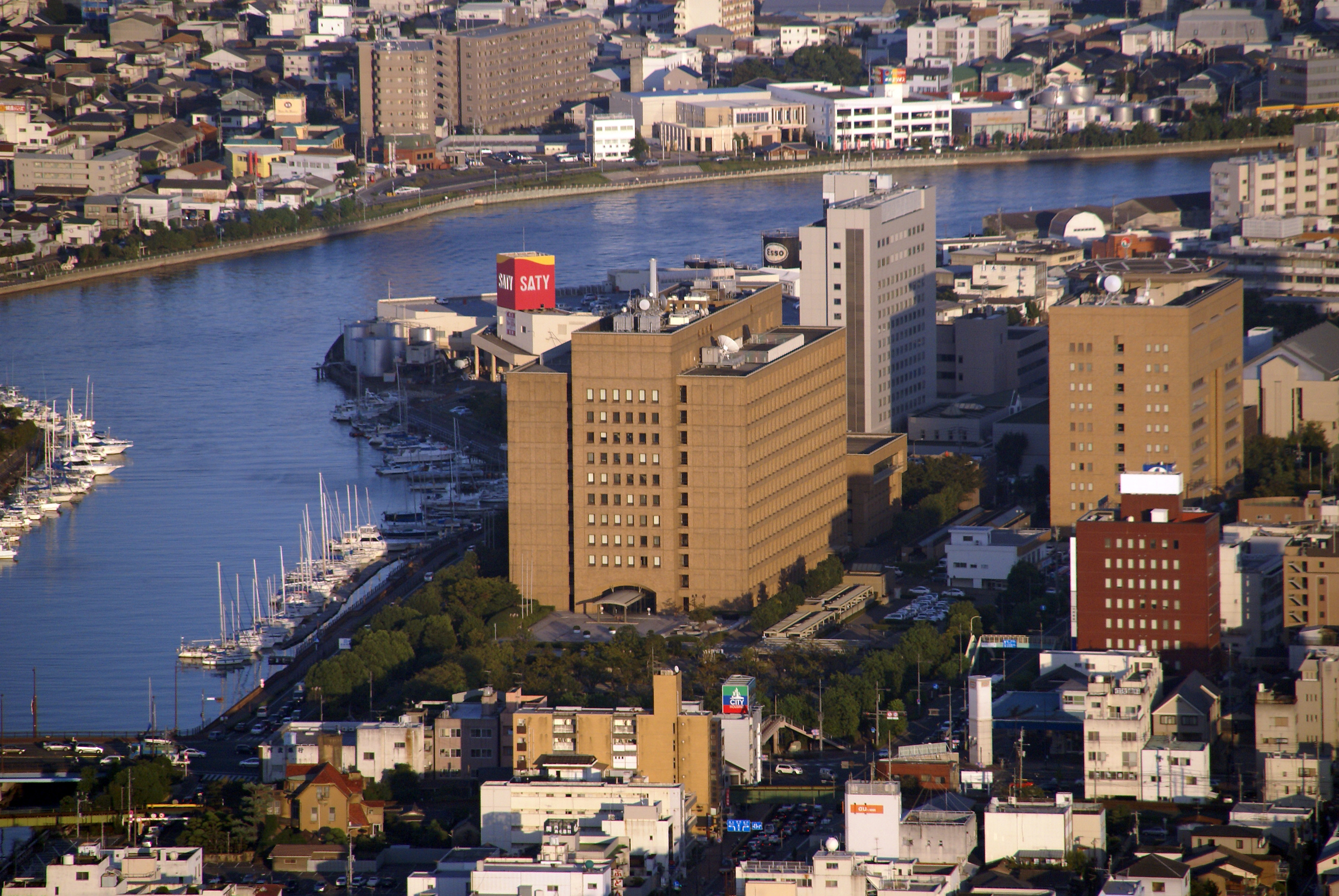
- The point where the Shinmachi and Suketō Rivers meet on the east side of Hyotan-jima. The building in the middle is the Tokushima Prefectural Government Office

Location
- Country: Japan

Physical characteristics
- Source
  - location: Tokushima City
- Mouth
  - coordinates: 34°03′09″N 134°35′33″E
  - elevation: sea level
- Length: 6.9 km (4.3 mi)

The Shinmachi River (新町川, Shinmachigawa) is a river found in the heart of Tokushima City in Tokushima Prefecture. The Suketō River, Tamiya River, Sako River, and Sumiyoshijima River are its tributaries.

At current, the non-profit organization Shinmachi Preservation Committee is in charge of keeping the river clean and holding tours around the river via boat.

== History ==
During the Edo period the Shinmachi River was a very busy area due to the travel of boats carrying indigo dyeing wares, one of the main trades supporting finance in the region at the time.

== Geography ==
The Shinmachi River runs through the middle of Tokushima, and passes by many well known tourist spots within the city area.

== Water ==
Up until the early Shōwa period, the condition of the river was so good as to allow people to swim there during the summertime. However, in the coming years the river became increasingly polluted and thus unsuitable for swimming. Efforts in recent years to clean up the river have improved its overall condition greatly, but there still remains some sludge on the bottom of the river and it has yet to return to its former glory.

== Main events along the waterway ==
=== Events ===
The Aibahama Park and Mizugiwai Park areas along the riverside are popular spots for events. The river itself is also used during an event each Christmas, in which people dressed in Santa suits distribute gifts to children along the riverside from atop boats. Over 3,000 presents are given out each year.

Event	Location	Date
The Hana Haru Festa	Aibahama Park	Three days during late April
The Tanabata Balloon Release	The Shinmachi Bashi Higashi Park	July 7 (Tanabata)
Awa Odori	Various areas alongside the river	Four days in mid-August
Awa no Tanuki Festival	Aibahama Park	Three days in early November
Winter Swimming in the Shinmachi River	Near the Mizugiwai Park	Winter
The Hyotan-jima River Festival	The Shinmachi Boardwalk	

=== Tourist spots ===
Tokushima City is home to many different historical sites due to its long history as the capital city in the region.

Name	Genre	Notes
Hyotan-jima Boat Cruise	Boat Cruise	The only free boat cruise in Japan.
Tokushima Castle Remains	Castle Remains	The remains of the castle built by the Hachisuka clan in years long past.
Washi no Mon	Historical Remains	Once used as the main gate to Tokushima Castle.
Tokushima Castle Garden	Garden	Nationally designated as one of the most famous gardens in all Japan.
Tokushima Castle Museum	Museum	A museum found in the middle of Tokushima Central Park and the remains of Tokushima Castle.
