= The Phantom Horse =

1955 Japanese film

- Film poster
- Directed by: Koji Shima
- Written by: Hiroaki Fujii; Kimiyuki Hasegawa; Koji Shima
- Produced by: Masaichi Nagata; Kazuo Tsukaguchi
- Starring: Bontarô Miyake; Ayako Wakao; Yukihiro Iwatare; Yoshiro Kitahara; Koreya Senda; Eijirō Yanagi; Akihiko Yusa
- Cinematography: Michio Takahashi
- Edited by: Tōyō Suzuki
- Music by: Seitarō Ōmori; Kōji Shima
- Distributed by: Daiei
- Release date: 20 July 1955 (Japan)
- Running time: 90 minutes
- Country: Japan
- Language: Japanese

The Phantom Horse (Japanese: 幻の馬, Hepburn: Maboroshi no uma) is a 1955 color (Eastmancolor) Japanese drama film directed by Koji Shima. The film was entered into the 1956 Cannes Film Festival.

The film is loosely based on the life of Tokino Minoru, a race horse whose life was cut short not long after winning the Tōkyō Yūshun and was owned by Masaichi Nagata.

== Plot ==
Takeru was born at Jiro’s Shiraishi Ranch just as the morning sun began to shine over the pure white winter fields. His mother was a gentle mare named Chidori. At the neighboring Onishi Ranch, a foal named Wakaarashi had also just been born. Jiro’s father, Yasuke, his older sister, Yukie, and his older brother, Ichiro—who aspired to become a jockey—were all overjoyed. Yukie, who was dating Tokio, the son of the Onishi family who had just returned home after graduating from veterinary school in Tokyo, also looked delighted.

One day, a man came from Tokyo to Onishi Ranch to buy a racehorse. And so, Wakaarashi was sold. Around that time, a fire broke out in a nearby forest, and Takeru—who had been eating chidori and young grass—was engulfed by the smoke. Yasuke leaped into the flames to save Takeru, but he tripped over a stump, suffered severe burns, and died. Eventually, Takeru also went to the Ishikawa Stable along with Ichiro, who was entering a jockey training school. Jiro wept bitterly at the thought of parting ways, but his sister Yukie comforted him, saying, “It’s for Takeru’s sake,” and he managed to hold back his tears.

When the time came for Takeru’s debut race, he seemed to be haunted by memories of the terrifying wildfire and didn’t perform well, resulting in a disqualification. However, thanks to Ichiro’s efforts to acclimate him to loud noises, Takeru went on to win all ten of his subsequent races. Just before the Derby, however, a fire broke out at the stable, and Takeru became so agitated that he injured his leg. Yukie, Jiro, and Tamotsu all traveled to Tokyo to care for him. With a mix of anxiety and anticipation, they awaited the Derby.

== Cast ==
- Bontarō Miyake as Yasuke Shiraishi
- Ayako Wakao as Yuki Shiraishi
- Yukihiro Iwatare as Jiro Shiraishi
- Yoshiro Kitahara as Toki Onoshi
- Koreya Senda as Hamamura
- Eijirō Yanagi as Hyogoro Onishi
- Akihiko Yusa as Ichiro Shiraishi
