= Suketō River =

Coordinates: 34°04′01″N 134°33′50″E

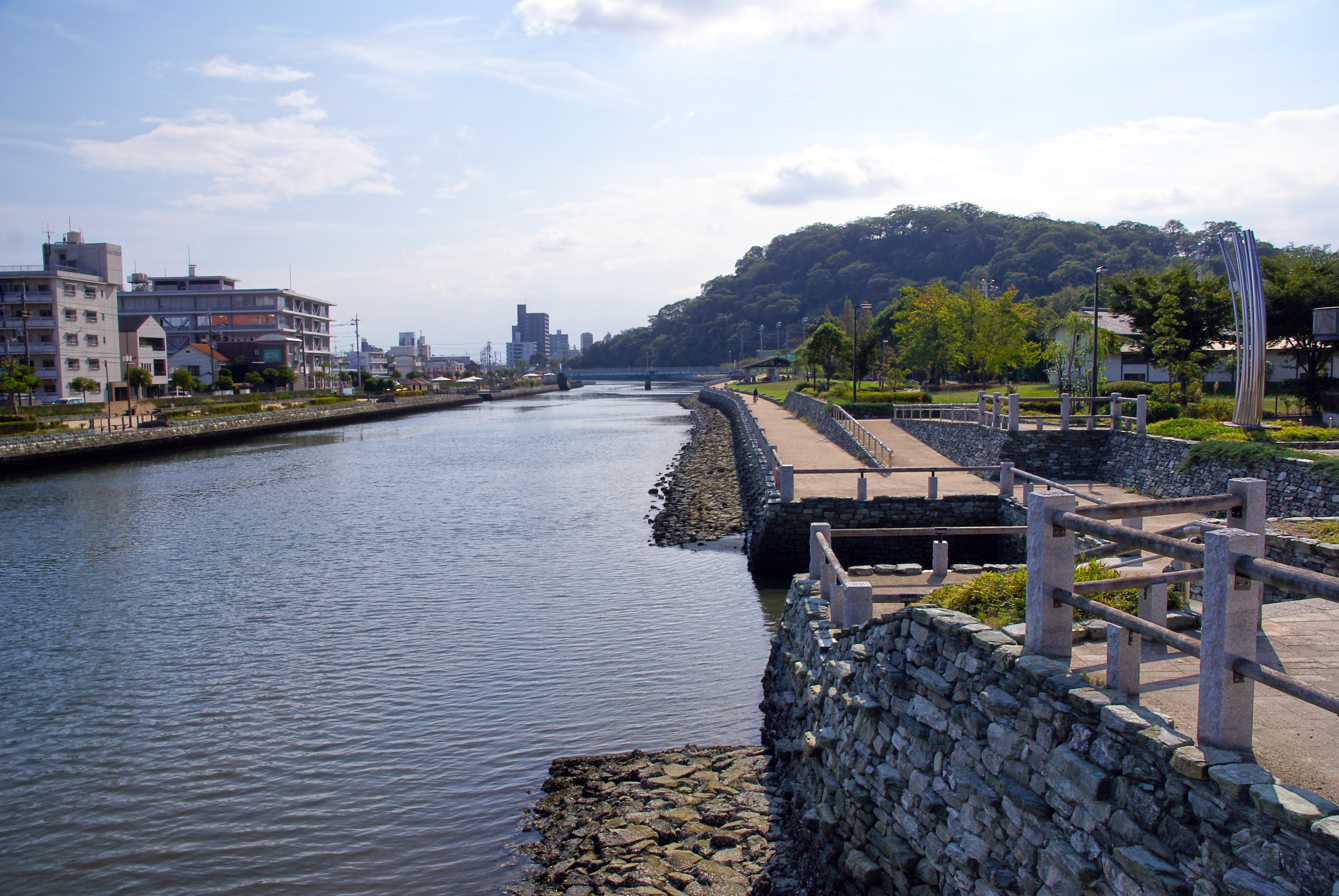
- The Suketō River, one of the rivers running through the center of Tokushima City.

Location
- Country: Japan
- Region: Tokushima City in Tokushima Prefecture

Physical characteristics
- Source
  - location: Runoff from the Shinmachi River
- Mouth
  - location: Shinmachi River

The Suketō River (助任川; Suketō-gawa), also called the Fukushima River, is a river in Tokushima Prefecture, Japan.

== Course ==
It starts on the western side of Hyōtan-jima where the Shinmachi River hits the Mitsuai Bridge and runs around to meet the river again to the east. The river passes through the Maegawa, Suketō, Fukushima, and Hyōtan-jima districts, as well as several others. In midstream, the Suketō River branches out into the Ōokagawa and Sumiyoshi-jima Rivers, and is known by some people as the "Fukushima River" in the area where it passes by the district of the same name. The Suketō River is crossed by the Mitsuai, Maegawa, Nishi no Maru, Suketō, New Suketō, Myōjin, Tokusumi, Fukushima, Sumiyoshi, New Fukushima, Nakazu and several other bridges.

== Ecology ==
According to research in the year 2006, the river has a chemical oxygen demand of around 4–5 parts per million, making it slightly dirtied, but the water is clear to 50 cm in depth and still relatively clean. The Shinmachi Preservation Committee is working towards keeping the river and its waterways clean.

In the year 2007, a stingray was found living in the waters of the river. While the details remain unknown, it is said to have made its way there from the mouth of the Yoshino River .

== Fukushima River ==
The Fukushima River is another name for the Suketō River, mostly supported by those living further downstream of the river than the Fukushima Bridge. While the name 'Fukushima' refers to one of the prefectures in Japan, it is also a suburb in Tokushima City. The river is recorded as "Suketō River" on the Fukushima Bridge, and as "Fukushima River" on the New Fukushima Bridge.
