= Tokushima Arts Foundation for Culture =

Coordinates: 34°4′30.4″N 134°32′46.2″E

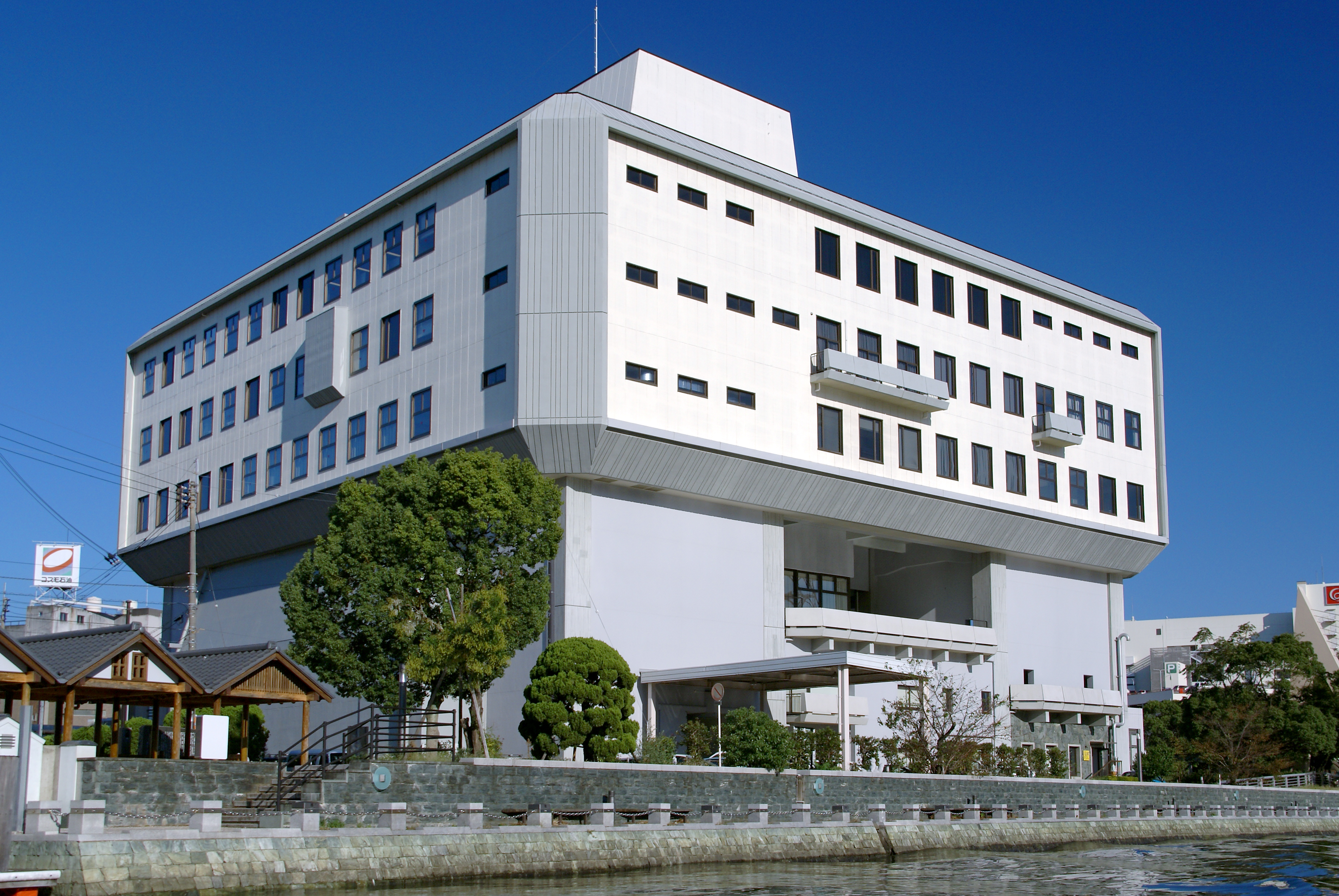
The Tokushima Arts Foundation for Culture

The Tokushima Arts Foundation for Culture (徳島県郷土文化会館) is a multi-purpose cultural facility found in the Aiba-cho district in Tokushima City, Tokushima Prefecture. It sits on the grounds of the Aibahama Park and runs alongside the Shinmachi River.

== Overview ==
=== Location ===
- 〒770-0835 Tokushima Prefecture, Tokushima City, Aiba-cho 2-14 (徳島県徳島市藍場町2丁目14番地)
- TEL - 088-622-8121
- FAX - 088-622-8123
- Open Hours - 9:00～21:30 (Exhibitions until 17:00)
- Open Period - January 4 to December 28 every year.

== Facilities ==
- 1F - Multi-purpose hall (792 seats)
- 2F - Special exhibition room
- 3F - Exhibition room
- 4F - Meeting rooms, etc.
- 5F - Meeting rooms, etc.

== Access ==
- Just eight minutes walk from the JR Tokushima Station.
