= Nichiren to Mōko Daishūrai =

Nichiren and the Great Mongol Invasion
- Theatrical release poster
- Directed by: Kunio Watanabe
- Written by: Fuji Yahiro; Kunio Watanabe
- Produced by: Masaichi Nagata
- Starring: Kazuo Hasegawa
- Cinematography: Takashi Watanabe
- Edited by: Miyata Mitsuzo
- Music by: Eiichi Yamada
- Production company: Daiei Film
- Distributed by: Daiei
- Release date: October 1, 1958
- Running time: 145 minutes
- Country: Japan
- Language: Japanese
- Budget: ¥500 million
- Box office: ¥35.12 million

Nichiren and the Great Mongol Invasion (日蓮と蒙古大襲来, Nichiren to Mōko Daishūrai) is a 1958 Japanese drama film directed by Kunio Watanabe. This and the 1979 film Nichiren were produced by Masaichi Nagata for his devotion to Nichiren and the Nichiren-shū.

== Plot ==
Nichiren, a famous Japanese Buddhist monk who returns from his studies to create a new form of Buddhism in preparation for fighting the Mongol invaders during the 1200s. A Buddhist sect and their government supporters target him and he is persecuted for it. Will Nichiren be able to survive before the Mongols threaten Japanese shores?

== Cast ==
- Kazuo Hasegawa as Nichiren
- Raizo Ichikawa
- Shintaro Katsu
- Narutoshi Hayashi
- Shoji Umewaka
- Yatarō Kurokawa
- Takashi Shimura
- Takanobu Hozumi
- Kunie Tanaka

== Crew ==
=== Special effects ===
- Yonesaburo Tsukiji - director
- Tōru Matoba
- Hiroshi Imai (cinematographer)
- Yoshiyuki Kuroda - assistant director
- Yonesaburo Tsukiji
- Narumi Honma
- Genkon Nakaoka
