= Nichiren (film) =

1979 Japanese film

- Film poster
- Directed by: Noboru Nakamura
- Screenplay by: Noboru Nakamura
- Based on: Nichiren; by Matsutarō Kawaguchi
- Produced by: Masaichi Nagata
- Starring: Kinnosuke Yorozuya
- Cinematography: Hiroshi Takemura
- Edited by: Zen Ikeda
- Music by: Yasushi Akutagawa
- Production company: Masakazu Nagata Production
- Distributed by: Shochiku
- Release date: 10 March 1979 (Japan)
- Running time: 143 minutes
- Country: Japan
- Language: Japanese

Nichiren (Japanese: 日蓮) is a 1979 Japanese historical drama film written and directed by Noboru Nakamura. Based on Matsutarō Kawaguchi's novel of the same name, the film chronicles the life of Nichiren, a Japanese Buddhist monk of the Kamakura period. It was the last film Nakamura directed.

It was produced by Masaichi Nagata, who had previously produced Nichiren and the Great Mongol Invasion by Daiei Film in 1958.

== Cast ==
- Kinnosuke Yorozuya as Nichiren
- Kyoko Kishida as Mother of Nichiren
- Takahiro Tamura as Father of Nichiren
- Katsuo Nakamura as Nisshō
- Toshiyuki Nagashima as Nikkō Shōnin
- Kō Nishimura as Abutsu
- Harue Akagi as Wife of Abutsu
- Shinsuke Mikimoto as Nanbu Sanenaga
- Hideo Kanze as Hiki Yoshimoto
- Kunie Tanaka as Gyōdō
- Shinjirō Ehara as Kudo Yoshitaka
- Keiko Matsuzaka as Wife of Kudo Yoshitaka
- Tetsurō Tamba as Nichijō
- Yoko Nogiwa as Wife of Nichijō
- Goro Ibuki as Shijo Kingo
- Asao Koike as Tōjō Kagenobu
- Rinichi Yamamoto as Ichi Shigenao
- Takeshi Kato as Yozaburō
- Kimiko Ikegami as Daughter of Yozaburō
- Kanjūrō Arashi as Shogaki
- Hideji Ōtaki as Dōzen
- Sakae Umezu as Ninshō
- Asao Sano as Yadoya Mitsunori
- Akiji Kobayashi as Lanxi Daolong
- Ichirō Nakatani as Taira no Yoritsuna
- Ryosuke Kagawa as Hōjō Masamura
- Hiroki Matsukata as Hōjō Tokimune
- Ichikawa Somegorō VI as Hōjō Tokiyori
