= Hajime Matsumoto =

Hajime Matsumoto (松本 哉, Matsumoto Hajime; born October 17, 1974) is a Japanese activist, and owner of a second-hand goods shop in Koenji, Tokyo.

== Activism ==
Matsumoto founded the Association to Protect Poor Students of Hosei University while a student at Hosei University. He spent about four months in jail for throwing paint on the president of his university and is now mainly active in Koenji, Tokyo. He was one of the main originators of the artistic and social activist collective Amateur Revolt, which started in 2005 but became especially well known in 2011 for its anti-nuclear activism following quickly upon the heels of the Fukushima Daiichi nuclear disaster. He states his goal as creating a space where people can have fun without money.

He was denied entry to South Korea on September 30, 2010, on security grounds.
