= Kōenji Awa Odori =

Summer street festival in Tokyo, Japan

Kōenji Awa-Odori
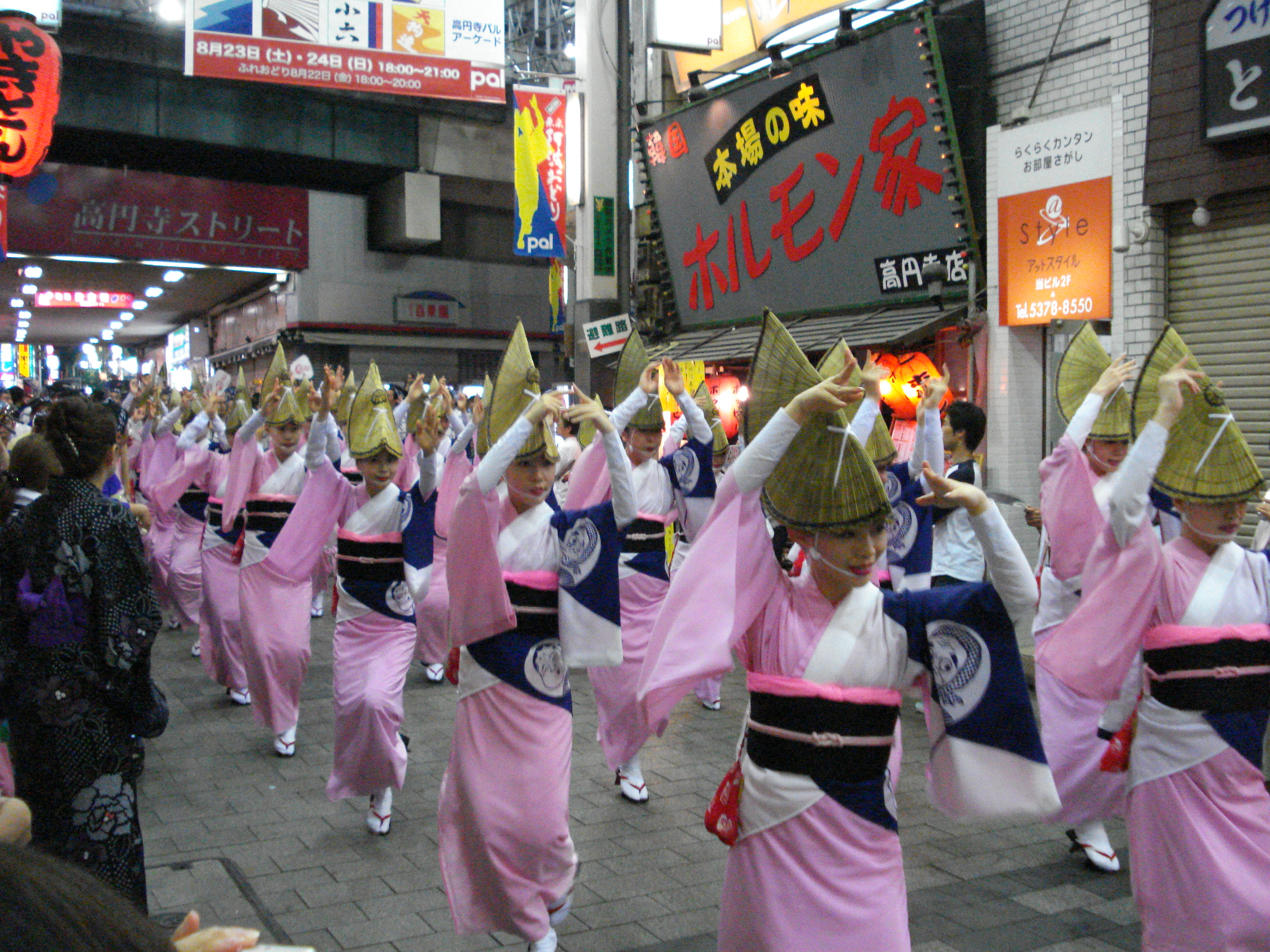
- Kōenji Awa-Odori
- Observed by: Tokyo
- Type: Local
- Date: Last Saturday and Sunday in August
- Related to: Tokushima Awa Odori

Kōenji Awa-Odori (高円寺阿波おどり) is one of Tokyo’s largest summer street festivals with up to 12,000 dance team participants and over 1.2 million visitors over the two day event.

Held on the last weekend of August in and around the neighbourhood of Kōenji, Suginami the Awa Dance Festival is the largest of its kind outside of Tokushima Prefecture.

The dance is performed by dance troupes, referred to as Ren (連) group of up to 100 musicians and dancers advancing in lines along the local streets to the accompaniment of shamisen, drums, flutes and cymbals. The dance troupes are mixed both in age and gender with women showcasing intricate formation dance steps wearing traditional yukata, geta and straw amigasa hats.

Local community groups and schools take part in the festivities, but to keep performance standards high the Kōenji Awa-Odori also has a competition element leading to dance troupes from across Japan applying to participate.

== Gallery ==
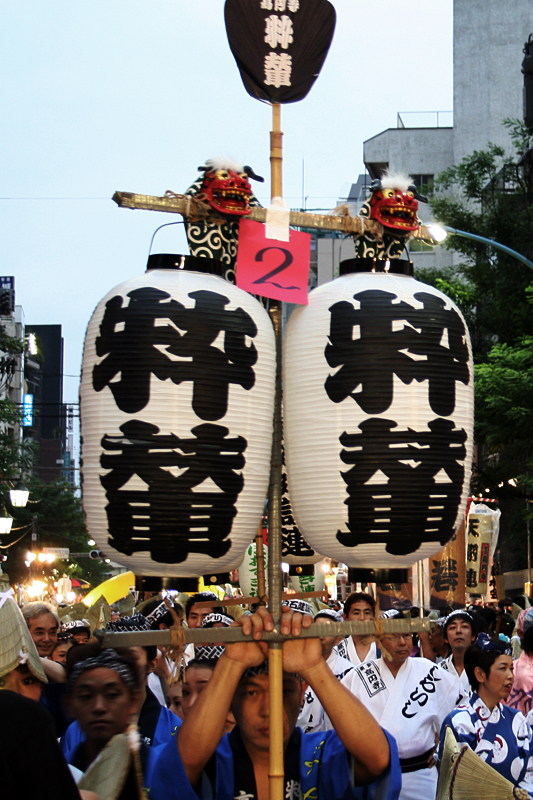
Banner displaying name of ren

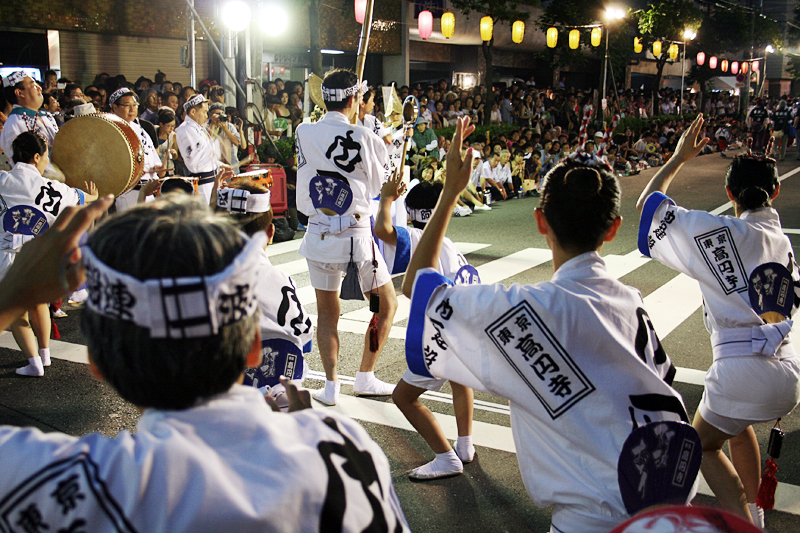
Lead (younger) dancers of a local Koenji ren

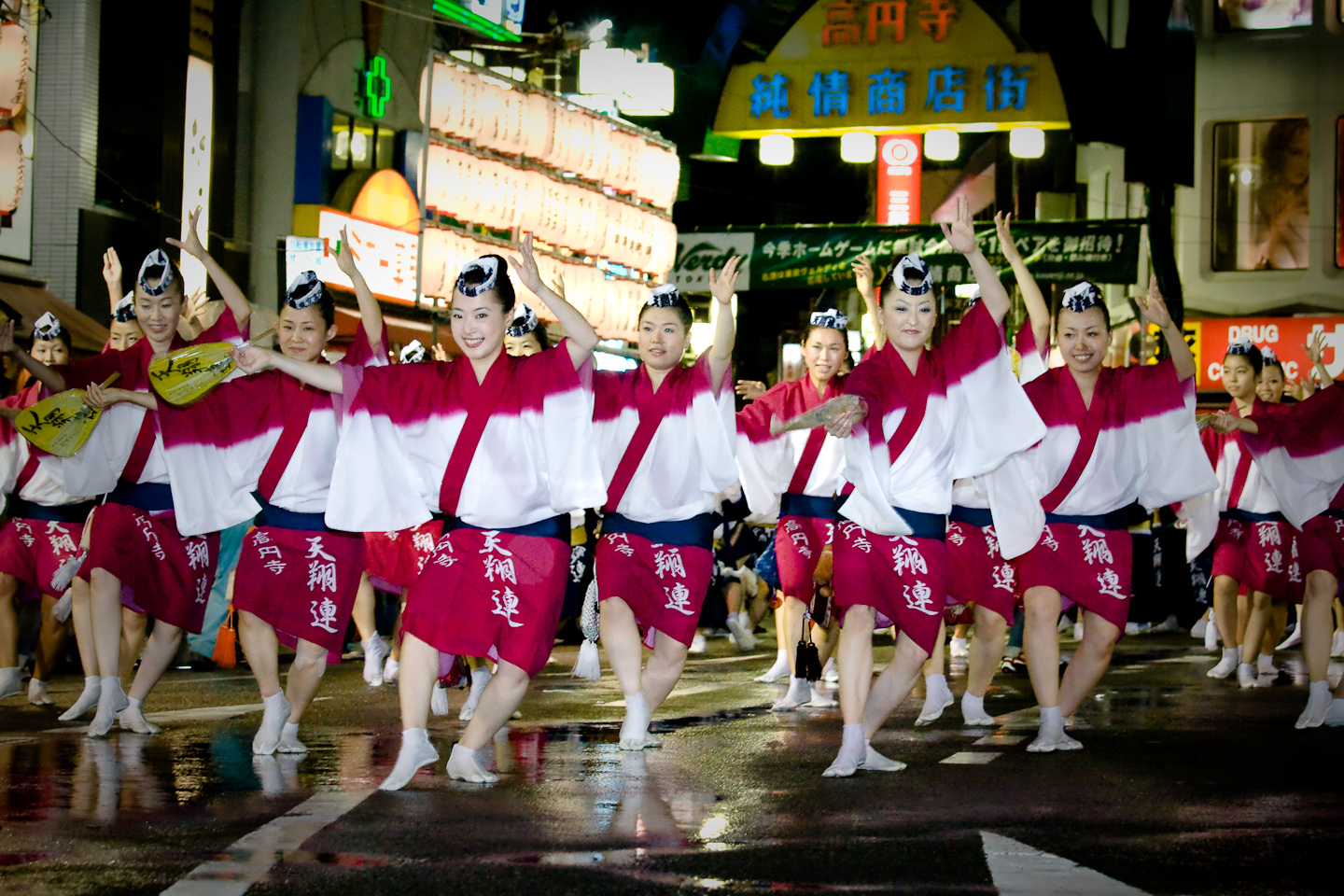
Female dance team (a component of the ren)

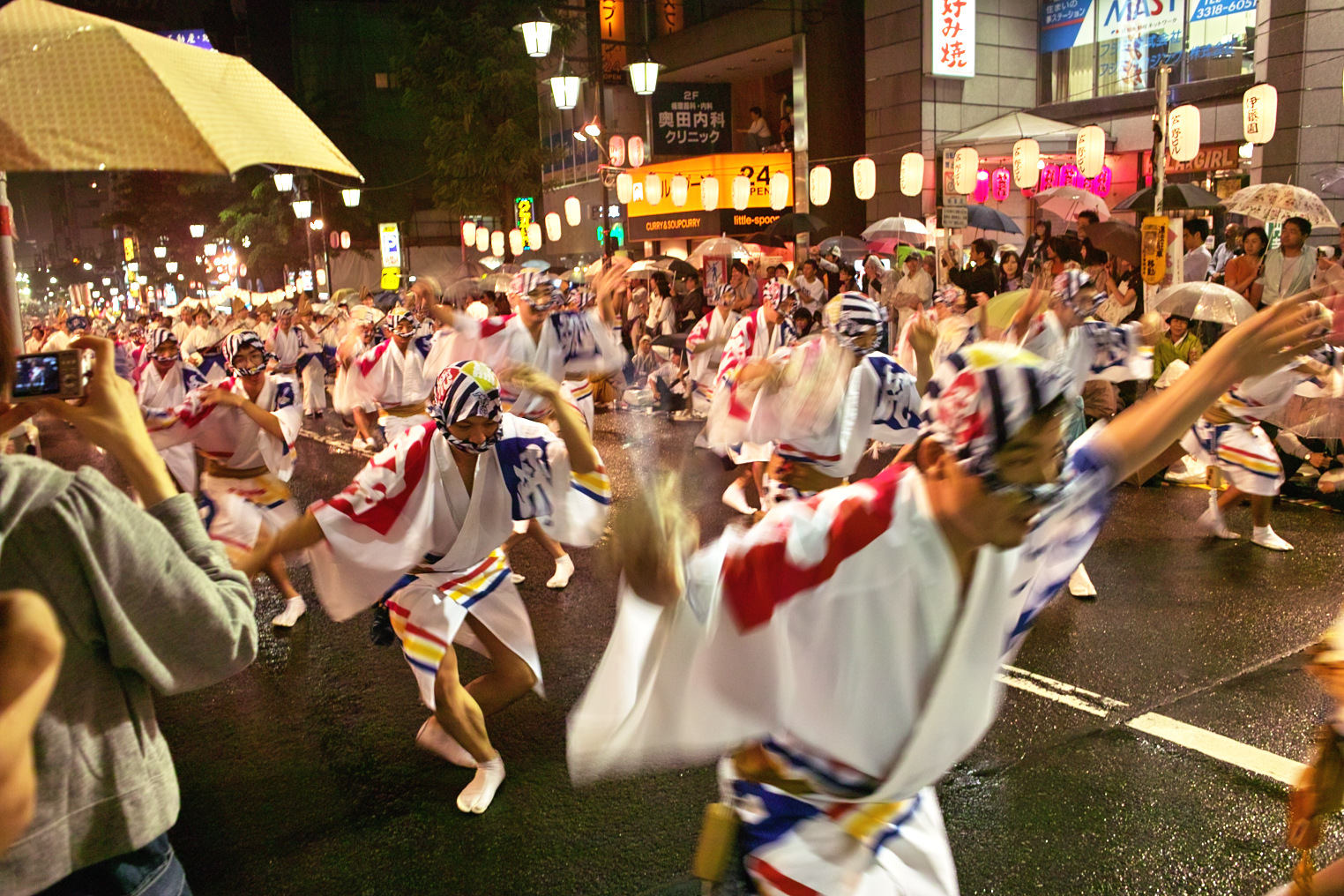
Male dance team (a component of the ren)

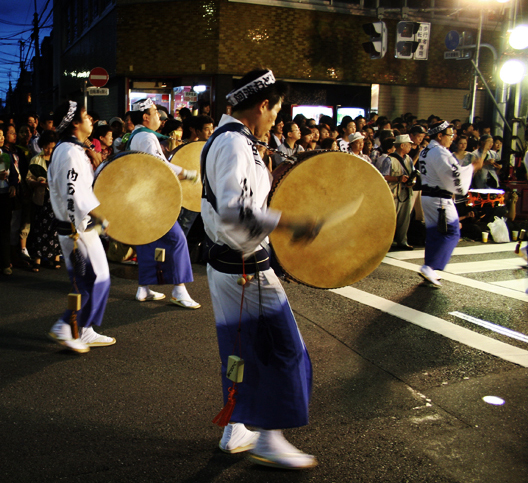
Musicians at the rear of the ren dance troupe

Kōenji Awa Odori（2017）
