= Tokino Minoru =

Japanese thoroughbred racehorse (1948–1951)

Tokino Minoru トキノミノル
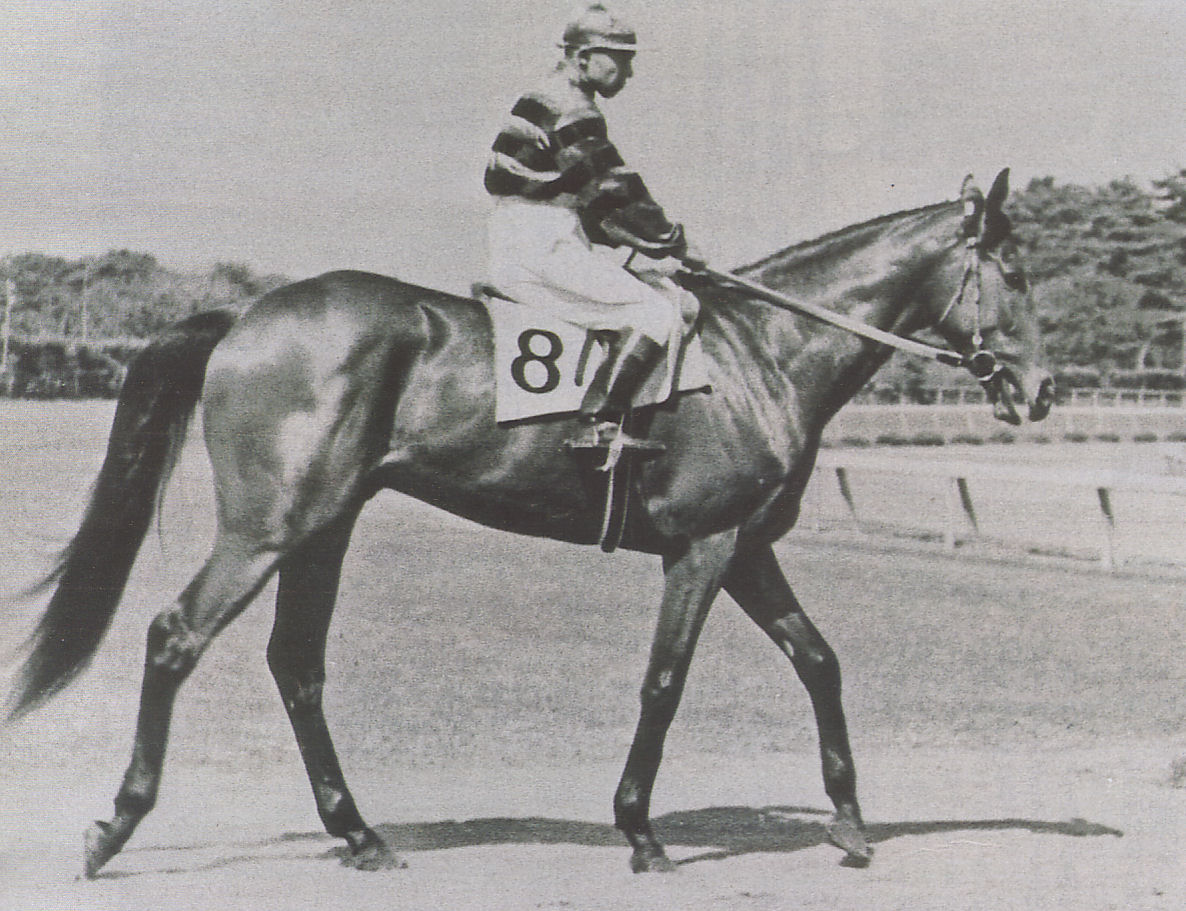
- Tokino Minoru at the 1951 Satsuki Sho.
- Breed: Thoroughbred
- Sire: Theft (IRE)
- Grandsire: Tetratema (IRE)
- Dam: Daini Tyrant's Queen (JPN)
- Damsire: Soldennis (IRE)
- Sex: Colt
- Foaled: 2 May 1948
- Died: 20 June 1951 (aged 3)
- Country: Japan
- Colour: Bay
- Breeder: Honkiri spread Co., Ltd.
- Owner: Masaichi Nagata
- Racing colours
- Trainer: Kazuichiro Tanaka
- Jockey: Mitsumasa Iwashita
- Record: 10: 10-0-0
- Earnings: 4,257,150 yen

Major wins
- Asahi Hai Sansai Stakes (1950); Japanese Classic Race wins: Satsuki Sho (1951); Tokyo Yushun (1951)

Honours
- Japan Racing Association Hall of Fame (1984)

Tokino Minoru (Japanese: トキノミノル, Hepburn: Tokino Minoru; May 2, 1948 – June 20, 1951) was a Japanese Thoroughbred racehorse and stallion who was undefeated in 10 race starts. With a record of 10 wins in 10 starts and seven record-breaking times, he won the Double Crown, but died suddenly of tetanus 17 days after the Tokyo Yushun and was dubbed the “phantom horse.” He is the only horse to have run 10 or more races in postwar Central Racing and maintain a perfect record. Mitsumasa Iwashita rode him in every race. In 1984, he was selected for the Japan Racing Association Hall of Fame.

== Background ==
Tokino Minoru was born on May 2, 1948, at the Honkiri Ranch in Mitsuishi, Hokkaido (now merged into Shinhidaka, Hokkaido). His sire, Theft, was the leading sire at the time, and his dam, Daini Tyrant's Queen, was the daughter of Tyrant's Queen, one of the foundation imported mares at Koiwai Farm and he was her sixth foal. His foal name was “Perfect.” Although seven broodmares were kept at Honkiri Ranch at the time, Perfect was the only foal born that year. For this reason, a colt of the same age was purchased from Chiba Prefecture to serve as a “playmate,” and the two spent their early years together.

According to the recollections of his breeder, Masahiko Kasagi, he was “a large, sturdy foal from the moment she was born.” However, at the time, Theft was viewed in Japan as a sire suited for short distances and since his siblings’ racing records were not impressive, Perfect did not find a buyer immediately. However, trainer Kazuichiro Tanaka, who had come from Tokyo, was captivated by the development of the horse’s hindquarters and recommended the purchase to Masaichi Nagata, president of Daiei Film. Although Nagata was initially reluctant, he was persuaded by Kasagi and purchased the horse, adding it to his own stable. Nagata paid Kasagi 500,000 yen as a deposit on the spot and later paid another 500,000 yen to complete the purchase for a total of 1 million yen. However, Nagata did not seem particularly attached to the horse and had not given it a racing name even by the time it reached the racing age of three. In response, Kasagi consulted with Tanaka, and the horse was reluctantly registered for racing under its pedigree name, “Perfect.”

== Racing career ==
Major racing wins

- 1950 Asahi Hai Sansai Stakes, Nakayama Turf 1100m
- 1951 Satsuki Sho (Japanese 2000 Guineas), Nakayama Turf 2000m
- 1951 Tokyo Yushun (Japanese Derby), Tokyo Turf 2400m

He died in 1951 from tetanus-related sepsis, just 17 days after winning the Derby.

== Honours ==
The Kyodo Tsushin Hai, a three-year-old stakes race held at the Tokyo Racecourse, was given the subtitle "Tokino Minoru Kinen (Memorial)" in his honour in 1969. Tokino Minoru was inducted into the Japan Racing Association Hall of Fame in 1984.

== In popular culture ==
The owner of Tokino Minoru, Masaichi Nagata, who was the President of Daiei Film, commissioned a movie based on his life, titled The Phantom Horse, which was released in 1955. The film title eventually became an informal epithet in the Japanese horseracing scene, denoting promising horses that earn key victories (for example: one/two Triple Crown title/s) or undefeated streaks in their first few races, only for their careers to be cut short by injury retirement or early deaths.

== Legacy and memorials ==
At the time of Tokino Minoru's debut, national horse racing was struggling financially, overshadowed by the boom in local horse racing. Because of this, it was uncertain if it was possible to continue running the Japanese Derby. Tokino Minoru, who attracted widespread public attention, was seen as a 'saviour' for national horse racing. Among the more over 70,000 spectators who came on Derby day, Kuniharu Hashimoto said that 'many fans just wanted to see Tokino Minoru race, even if only for a moment'. The writer Takashi Iwakawa described it as 'not merely gambling. Even those who had previously been indifferent to horse racing began to visit the racetrack to witness the earnest and selfless sprint of this one horse, a gift from Heaven.' Iwakawa referred to Tokino Minoru as 'the founder of the Derby's revival' and 'the protagonist of the first horse racing boom.'

Keijiro Okawa, a horse racing commentator, regarding the Derby, recalled "When Tokino Minoru surged at the third corner, the crowd erupted. I thought, everyone is cheering for Tokino Minoru," and after the finish, he reflected, "Ah, finally horse racing has become something for everyone." He also reminisced about the memorable commemorative photo surrounded by fans, stating, "I felt that postwar horse racing had become racing for the fans." Okawa further remarked, "In Japanese horse racing history, whenever the fan base expanded and attention grew, there would always appear a significant star horse at the key moments." He identified Tokino Minoru as the first example of this, with future examples being Shinzan, Takeshiba O, Haiseiko, and Oguri Cap. Hidetaka Takamizu commented, "He was one of the pivotal figures in the era when horse racing solidified its position as a gambling sport."

== Racing record ==
The following racing form is based on information available on JBIS search and netkeiba.com.

Date	Age	Racecourse	Race	Grade	Distance	Gate	Fav.	Fin.	Time	Jockey	Winner (Runner-Up)
1950/07/23	3	Hakodate	Newcomer Race	Maiden	Turf 800m	1	2	1st	48.1	Mitsumasa Iwashita	(Matterhorn)
1950/08/23	3	Sapporo	Three-Year-Old Open	OP	Dirt 1000m	5	1	1st	1:02.0	Mitsumasa Iwashita	(Fumiwaka)
1950/09/03	3	Sapporo	Sapporo Stakes	OP	Dirt 1200m		2	1st	1:13.1	Mitsumasa Iwashita	(Track O)
1950/10/01	3	Nakayama	Three-Year-Old Open	OP	Turf 1000m	2	1	1st	1:01.2	Mitsumasa Iwashita	(Shadai Blues)
1950/10/15	3	Nakayama	Three-Year-Olds Winners Race		Turf 1100m	3	1	1st	1:05.4	Mitsumasa Iwashita	(Happy Unebi)
1950/12/10	3	Nakayama	Asahi Hai Sansai Stakes	OP	Turf 1100m		1	1st	1:06.3	Mitsumasa Iwashita	(Issei)
1951/04/01	4	Nakayama	Four-Year-Olds Selection Handicap		Turf 1800m	4	1	1st	1:52.1	Mitsumasa Iwashita	(Issei)
1951/04/28	4	Tokyo	Four-Year-Old Open	OP	Turf 1800m	3	1	1st	1:52.4	Mitsumasa Iwashita	(Issei)
1951/05/13	4	Nakayama	Satsuki Sho	OP	Turf 2000m	8	1	1st	2:03.0	Mitsumasa Iwashita	(Issei)
1951/06/03	4	Tokyo	Tokyo Yushun	OP	Turf 2400m	9	1	1st	2:31.1	Mitsumasa Iwashita	(Issei)

== Pedigree ==
Pedigree of Tokino Minoru bay stallion 1948
Sire Theft (IRE) 1932	Tetratema	The Tetrarch*	Roi Herode
Sire Theft (IRE) 1932	Tetratema	The Tetrarch*	Vahren
Sire Theft (IRE) 1932	Tetratema	Scotch Gift	Symington
Sire Theft (IRE) 1932	Tetratema	Scotch Gift	Maund
Sire Theft (IRE) 1932	Voleuse	Volta	Valens
Sire Theft (IRE) 1932	Voleuse	Volta	Agnes Velasquez
Sire Theft (IRE) 1932	Voleuse	Sun Worship	Sundridge
Sire Theft (IRE) 1932	Voleuse	Sun Worship	Doctrine
Dam Daini Tyrant's Queen (JPN) 1934	Soldennis(IRE)	Tredennis	Kendal
Dam Daini Tyrant's Queen (JPN) 1934	Soldennis(IRE)	Tredennis	St.Marguerite
Dam Daini Tyrant's Queen (JPN) 1934	Soldennis(IRE)	Soligena	Soliman
Dam Daini Tyrant's Queen (JPN) 1934	Soldennis(IRE)	Soligena	St.Guntheirn
Dam Daini Tyrant's Queen (JPN) 1934	Tyrant's Queen (GB)	Phalaris	Polymelus
Dam Daini Tyrant's Queen (JPN) 1934	Tyrant's Queen (GB)	Phalaris	Bromus
Dam Daini Tyrant's Queen (JPN) 1934	Tyrant's Queen (GB)	Silver Queen	The Tetrarch*
Dam Daini Tyrant's Queen (JPN) 1934	Tyrant's Queen (GB)	Silver Queen	Princess Sterling (14)

* Tokino Minoru is inbred 3S x 4D to the stallion The Tetrarch, meaning that he appears third generation on the sire side of his pedigree and fourth generation on the dam side of his pedigree.

== See also ==
- List of leading Thoroughbred racehorses
