= Kōenji =

Town in Suginami ward, Tokyo

Coordinates: 35°42′19″N 139°39′04″E

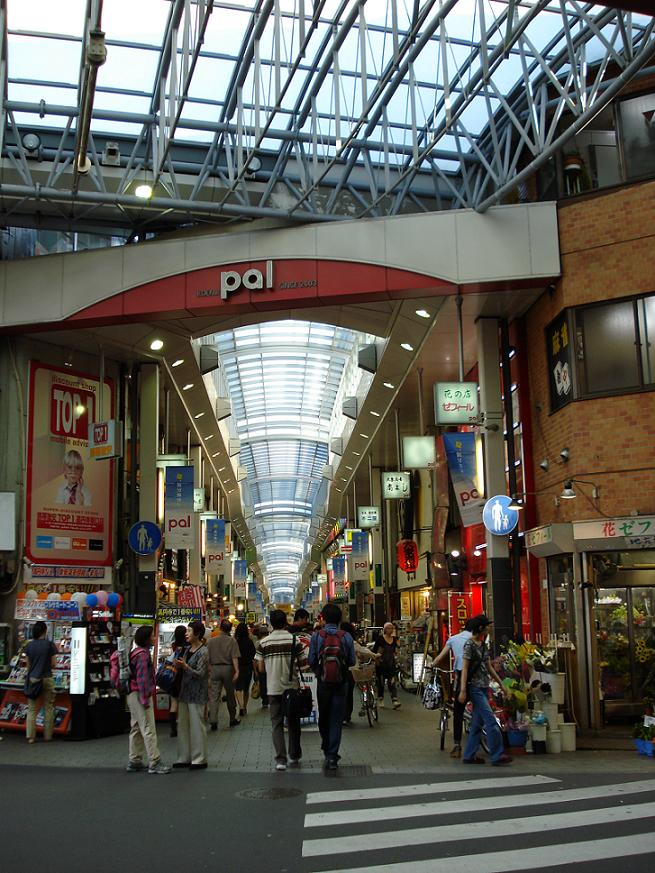
Koenji Pal Shopping Arcade

Kōenji (高円寺) is a district of Tokyo in the Suginami ward, west of Shinjuku. The district's name originates from the old temples in the area.

Kōenji is primarily a residential community with easy access to the Shinjuku and Tokyo stations. It was largely unaffected by the 1980s building boom and therefore many of the houses and shops in the area are small and reflect the character of "pre-boom" Japan. Due to its aging retail district and location on a major commuter route, the station area has become a center for small restaurants and "Live Houses" which offer live music. It is also known for having a young population and as a center for suburban underground culture including multiple used record and clothing shops. In 2006, when the Japanese PSE law went into effect restricting the sale of electronic goods built before 2001, Kōenji was chosen as the site for a protest due to its active "retro" culture and used equipment shops.

== History ==
The current division of Kōenji into north and south around Kōenji Station is a post-war arrangement. The whole area surrounding Shukuhōzan Kōenji temple used to be called Kōenji. There also used to be a town called Mabashi between Kōenji and nearby Asagaya, which has since been absorbed into Kōenji, although the name Mabashi is retained in some schools and shrines.

Koenji is reputed to be a bohemian hotspot since the 1960s, when folk rock stars like Takuro Yoshida (one of his songs is named “Koenji”) and Kosetsu Minami moved to the area. From the mid-1970s, live music venues opened throughout the neighborhood, turning it into a home for indie bands specializing in folk, psychedelic, punk and other forms of rock.

From 2018, the Suginami ward proposed to build a new road in the area, Auxiliary Road 227, which would run northward from Koenji Station through Nakano. The project would have resulted in the destruction of many buildings and shops. When the project was made public, demonstrations took place in Koenji to protest the construction of the road and the gentrification of the area. The 2018 demonstration was organised by Hajime Matsumoto, a leading figure in Heisei-era counterculture and famous for co-founding Shirōto no Ran ("Amateurs’ Riot" or "Amateurs’ Revolt").

The redevelopment of the area was planned for 2025, but it appears to have been abandoned for the time being.

== Entertainment ==
=== Shopping ===
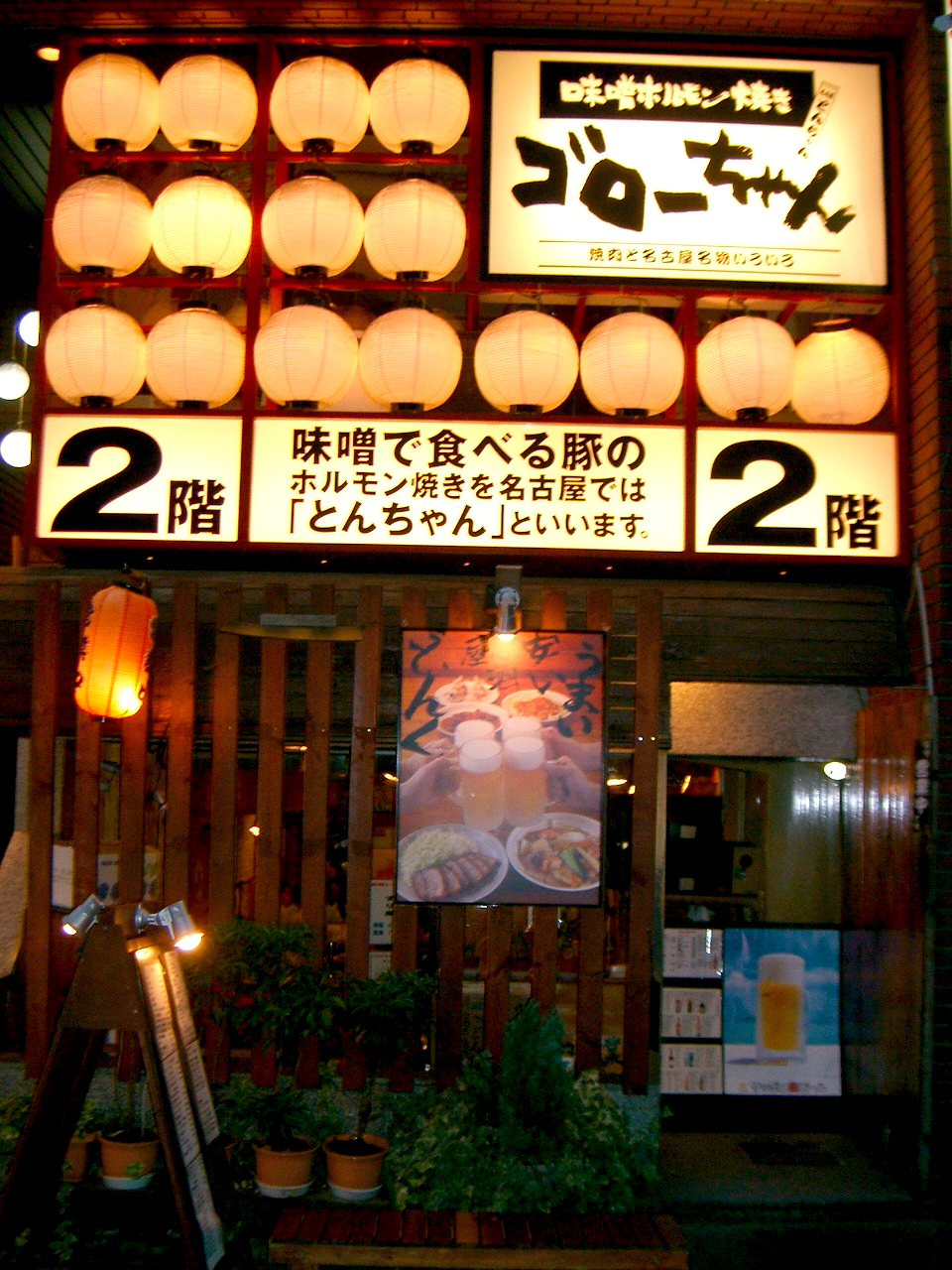
An izakaya in Higashi-Kōenji

After Harajuku and Shimokitazawa, Kōenji is the best-known area in Tokyo for used clothing shopping. The majority of the stores are on the south side of the JR station, on or near Look Shōtengai (ルック商店街).

South of the station is the "PAL" shopping arcade with many food, clothing, and discount goods shops. North of the station are two main shopping streets with used record shops, restaurants and cafes. West of the station, both north, south, and under the tracks, are many small yakitori restaurants and bars. The station itself was renovated in 2006, and a new Hotel Mets opened at the northern entrance in March 2007.

Between independent grocers and convenience chain stores there are also several large supermarkets, including Queen's Isetan (near Shin-Kōenji Station).

=== Eating and drinking ===
Dozens of yakitori restaurants, izakaya, ramen noodle restaurants, and bars can be found in the streets and alleys of north and south Kōenji, and under the elevated tracks near the JR station.

=== Awa Odori ===
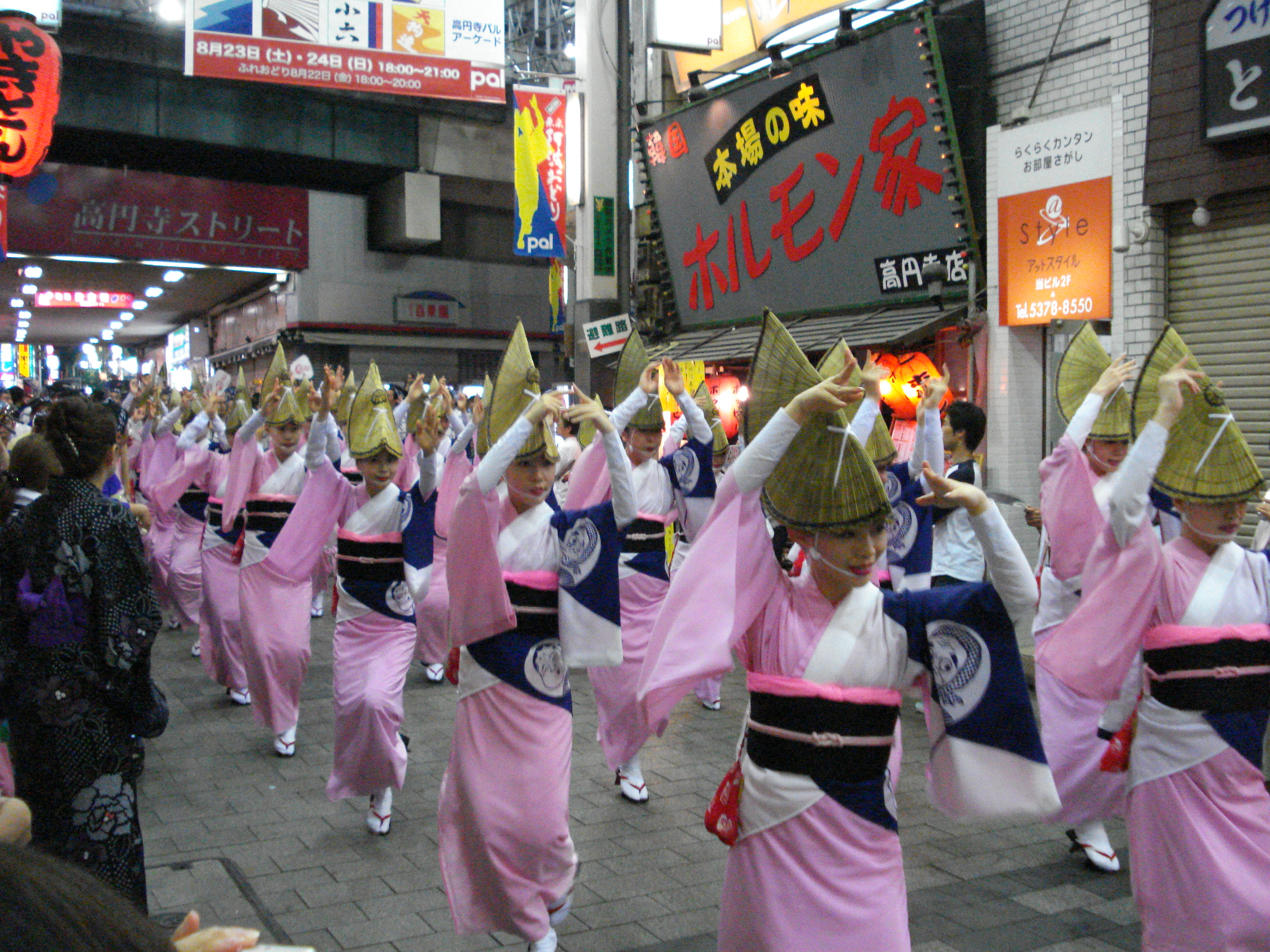
Kōenji Awa Odori

Kōenji Awa Odori, 2017

Each year in late August the Kōenji Awa Odori festival is held over two days. It has increasingly become a major tourist attraction for the area. It is the second largest Awa Dance Festival in Japan, with an average of 188 groups composed of 12,000 dancers, attracting 1.2 million visitors over the weekend.

The festival has its origins in Tokushima and was adopted by Kōenji post-war. A procession of groups performing traditional music and dance weaves its way through the streets on both sides of Kōenji Station, often with a dramatic conclusion at the "finish line".

=== Parks ===
There are several parks in the area, including Sanshi-no-mori (蚕糸の森), Mabashi Kōen (馬橋公園), and Wadabori Kōen (和田堀公園). Wadabori Kōen is the best in the immediate area for viewing cherry blossoms in spring, or for a stroll.

== Transport ==
The Kōenji area is accessible by the JR Chūō-Sōbu Line (Kōenji Station) and the Tokyo Metro Marunouchi Line (Shin-Kōenji Station or Higashi-Kōenji Station).

The major roads Waseda Dōri (早稲田通り), Kannana Dōri (環七通り) and Ōme Kaidō (青梅街道) also pass through the suburb.

== Education ==
Suginami City Board of Education operates public elementary and junior high schools.

Kōenji Kita and Kōenji Minami are zoned to different schools.
