= Awa Dance Festival =

Obon festival in Tokushima, Japan

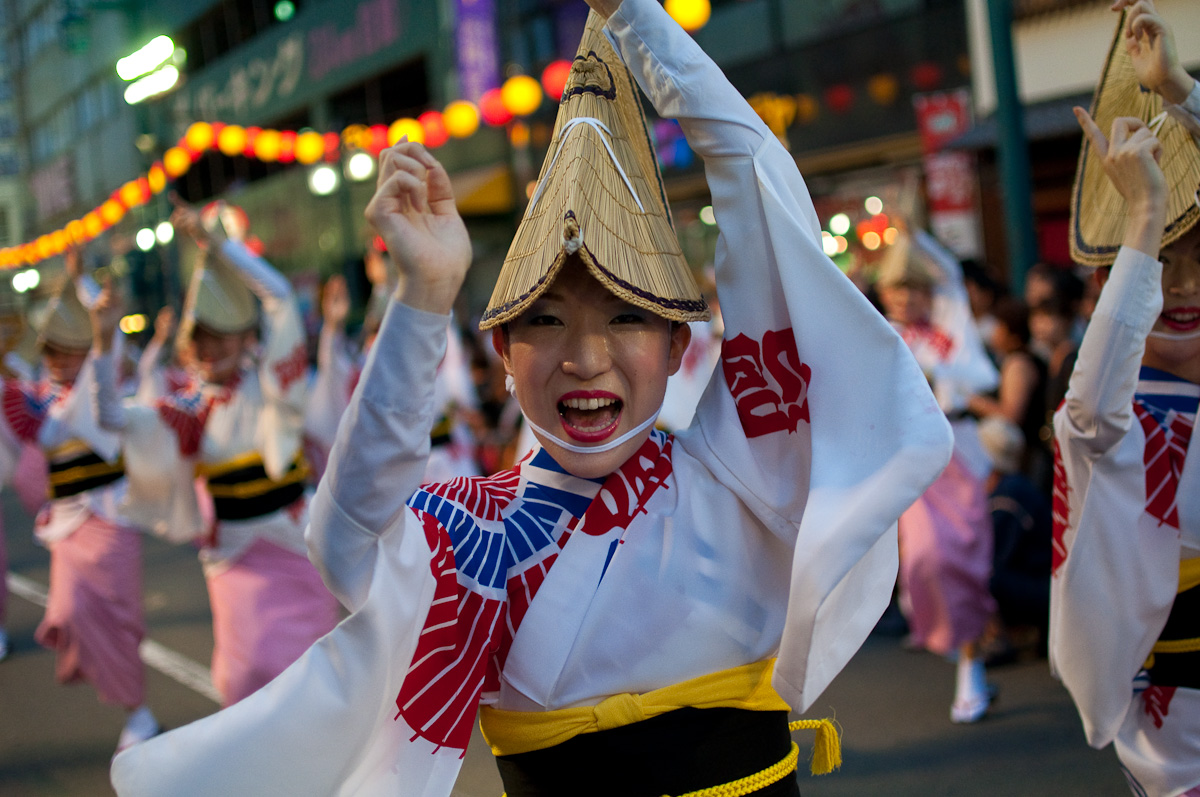
Awa Odori dancers (in Tokushima Prefecture, Shikoku)

The Awa Dance Festival (阿波踊り, Awa Odori) is held from 12 to 15 August as part of the Obon festival in Tokushima Prefecture on Shikoku in Japan. Awa Odori is the largest dance festival in Japan, attracting over 540 thousand tourists every year. Groups of choreographed dancers and musicians known as ren (連) dance through the streets, typically accompanied by the shamisen lute, taiko drums, shinobue flute and the kane bell. Performers wear traditional obon dance costumes, and chant and sing as they parade through the streets.

Awa is the old feudal administration name for Tokushima Prefecture, and odori means "dance".

== History ==
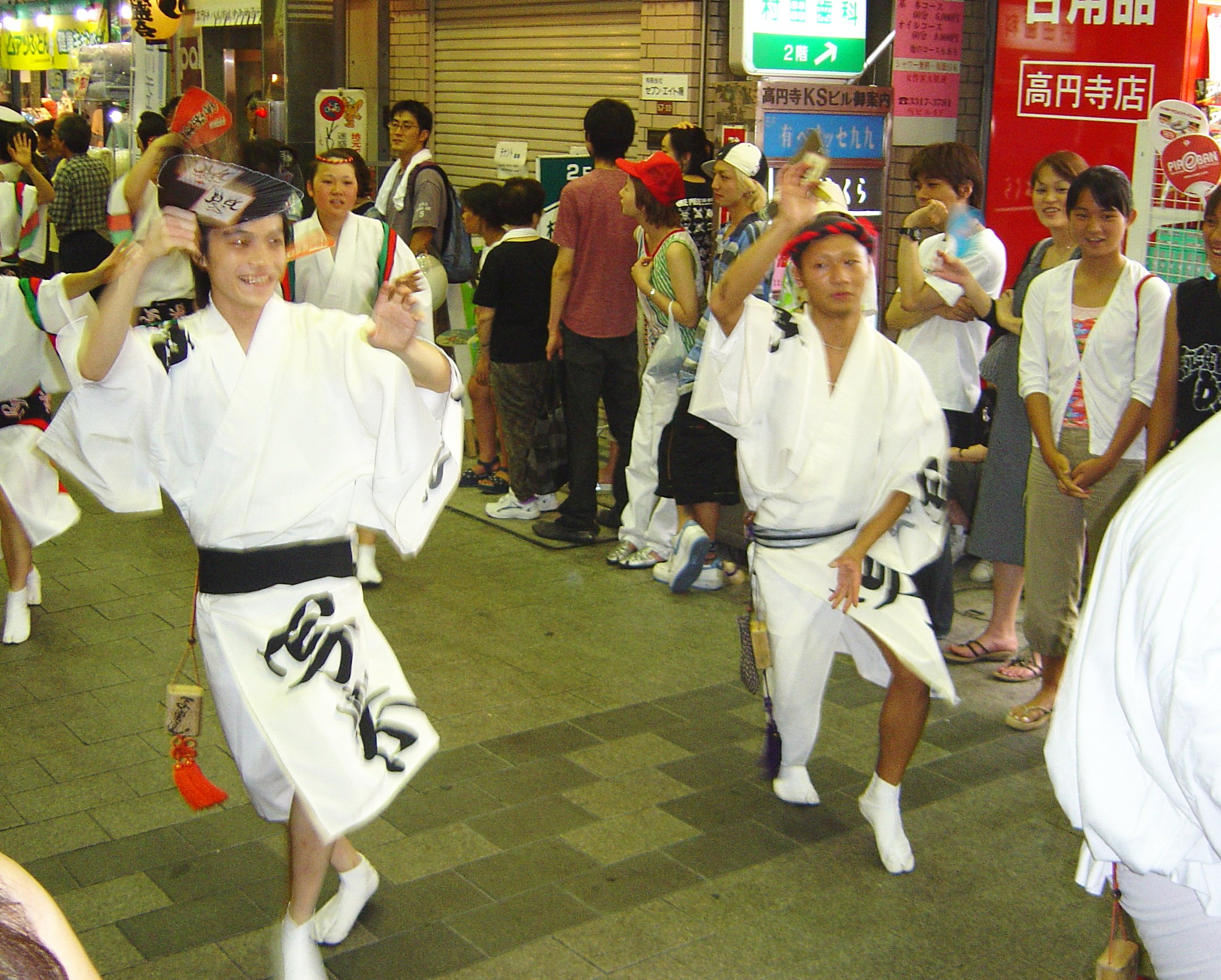
The Dance of Fools (in Kōenji, Tokyo)

The earliest origins of the dance style are found in the Japanese Buddhist priestly dances of Nembutsu-odori and hiji-odori of the Kamakura period (1185–1333), and also in kumi-odori, a lively harvest dance that was known to last for several days.

The Awa Odori festival grew out of the tradition of the Bon Odori which is danced as part of the Bon "Festival of the Dead", a Japanese Buddhist celebration where the spirits of deceased ancestors are said to visit their living relatives for a few days of the year. The term "Awa Odori" was not used until the 20th century, but Bon festivities in Tokushima have been famous for their size, exuberance and anarchy since the 16th century.

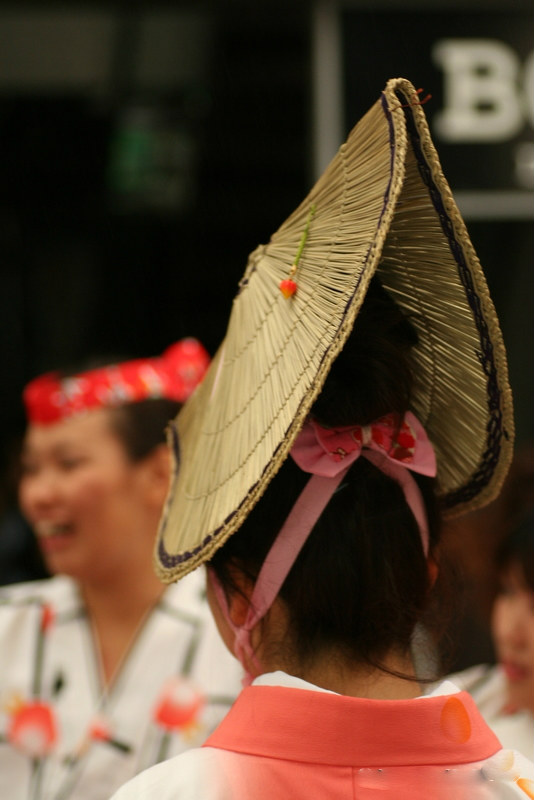
A dancer wearing an amigasa hat in Koenji, August 2009

Awa Odori's independent existence as a huge, citywide dance party is popularly believed to have begun in 1586 when Lord Hachisuka Iemasa, the daimyō of Awa Province hosted a drunken celebration of the opening of Tokushima Castle. The locals, having consumed a great amount of sake, began to drunkenly weave and stumble back and forth. Others picked up commonly available musical instruments and began to play a simple, rhythmic song, to which the revelers invented lyrics. The lyrics are given in the 'Song' section of this article.

This version of events is supported by the lyrics of the first verse of "Awa Yoshikono Bushi", a local version of a popular folk song which praises Hachisuka Iemasa for giving the people Awa Odori and is quoted in the majority of tourist brochures and websites. However, according to local historian Miyoshi Shoichiro, this story first appeared in a Mainichi Shimbun newspaper article in 1908 and is unsupported by any concrete evidence. It is unclear whether the song lyrics were written before or after this article appeared.

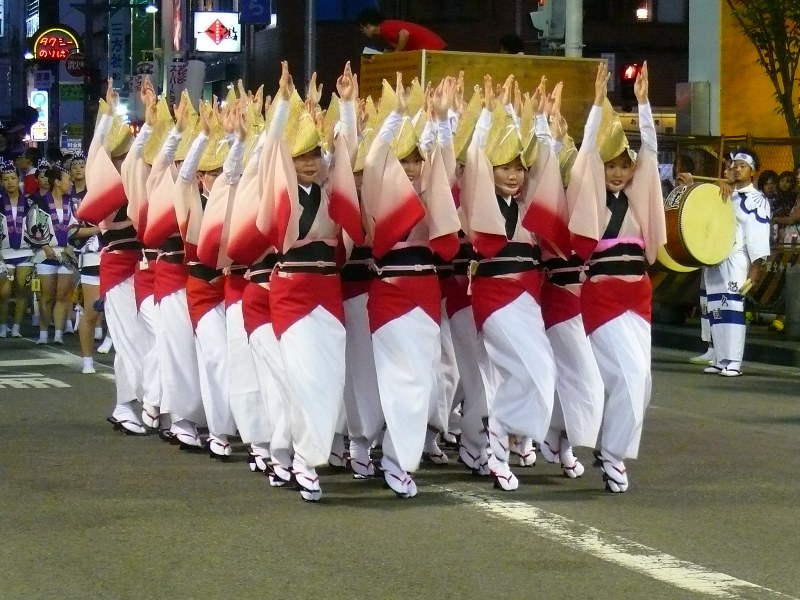
Awa Odori dancers in tight formation (in Tokushima Prefecture, Shikoku)

Some evidence of the festival's history comes from edicts issued by the Tokushima-han feudal administration, such as this one dating from 1671:

1. The bon-odori may be danced for only three days.
2. Samurai are forbidden to attend the public celebration. They may dance on their own premises but must keep the gates shut. No quarrels, arguments or other misbehaviour are allowed.
3. The dancing of bon-odori is prohibited in all temple grounds.

This suggests that by the 17th century, Awa's bon-odori was well established as a major event, lasting over three days—long enough to be a major disruption to the normal functioning of the city. It implies that samurai joined the festival alongside peasants and merchants, disgracing themselves with brawling and unseemly behaviour. In 1674, it was "forbidden for dancers or spectators to carry swords (wooden or otherwise), daggers or poles". In 1685 revelers were prohibited from dancing after midnight and dancers were not allowed to wear any head or face coverings, suggesting that there were some serious public order concerns.

In the Meiji period (1868–1912) the festival died down as the Tokushima's indigo trade, which had financed the festival, collapsed due to imports of cheaper chemical dyes. The festival was revitalised at the start of the Shōwa period (1926) when Tokushima Prefectural authorities first coined the name "Awa Odori" and promoted it as the region's leading tourist attraction.

== Song ==
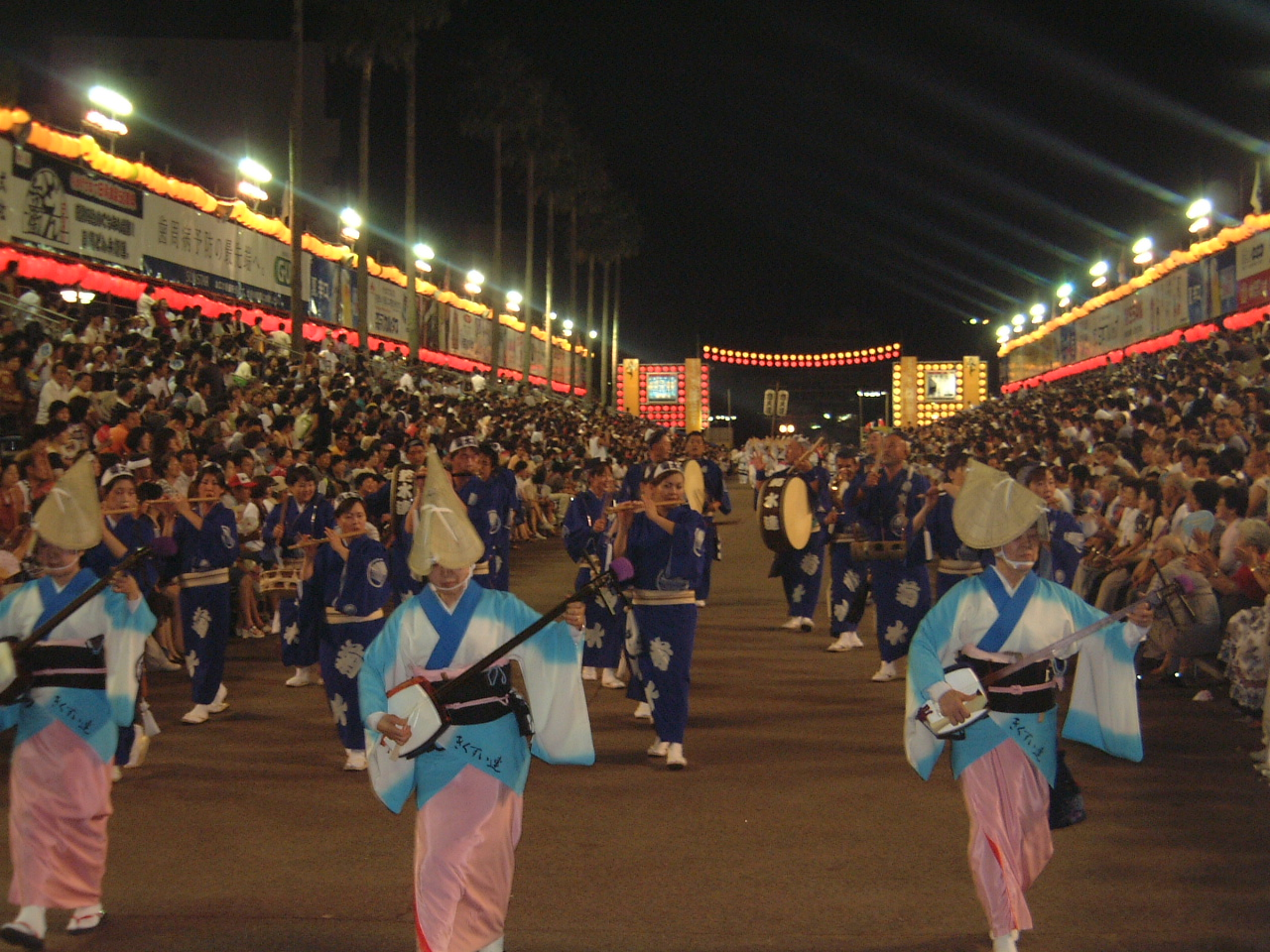
Narimono players (鳴り物, Narimono)

The song associated with Awa Odori is called Awa Yoshikono and is a localised version of the Edo period popular song Yoshikono Bushi. Parts of it are sung, and others are chanted. The origins of the melodic part have been traced to Kumamoto, Kyūshū, but the Awa version came from Ibaraki Prefecture, from where it spread back down to Nagoya and Kansai. The lyrics of the first verse are:

Awa no tono sama Hachisuka-sama ga ima ni nokoseshi Awa Odori
What Awa's Lord Hachisuka left us to the present day is Awa Odori

The song is usually sung at a point in the parade where the dancers can stop and perform a stationary dance — for example a street intersection or in front of the ticketed, amplified stands which are set up at points around the city. Not every group has a singer, but dancers and musicians will frequently break out into the Awa Yoshikono chant as they parade through the streets:

踊る阿呆に	Odoru ahou ni	The dancers are fools
見る阿呆	Miru ahou	The watchers are fools
同じ阿呆なら	Onaji ahou nara	Both are fools alike so
踊らな損、損	Odorana son, son	Why not dance?

The dancers also chant hayashi kotoba call and response patterns such as "Ayattosa, Ayattosa", "Hayaccha yaccha", "Erai yaccha, erai yaccha", and "Yoi, yoi, yoi, yoi". These calls have no semantic meaning but help to encourage the dancers.

== Dance ==
Dancers and musicians at Kōenji Awa Odori, 2017

During the daytime a restrained dance called Nagashi is performed, but at night the dancers switch to a frenzied dance called Zomeki. As suggested by the lyrics of the chant, spectators are often encouraged to join the dance.

Men and women dance in different styles. For the men’s dance: right foot and right arm forward, touch the ground with toes, then step with right foot crossing over left leg. This is then repeated with the left leg and arm. Whilst doing this, the hands draw triangles in the air with a flick of the wrists, starting at different points. Men dance in a low crouch with knees pointing outwards and arms held above the shoulders.

The women's dance uses the same basic steps, although the posture is quite different. The restrictive kimono allows only the smallest of steps forward but a crisp kick behind, and the hand gestures are more restrained and graceful, reaching up towards the sky. Women usually dance in tight formation, poised on the ends of their geta sandals.

Children and adolescents of both sexes usually dance the men's dance. In recent years, it has become more common to see adult women, especially those in their 20s, dancing the men's style of dance.

Some of the larger ren (dance groups) also have a yakko odori, or kite dance. This usually involves one brightly dressed, acrobatic dancer, darting backwards and forwards, turning cartwheels and somersaults, with freestyle choreography. In some versions, other male dancers crouch down forming a sinuous line representing the string, and a man at the other end mimes controlling the kite.

== Awa Dance Festivals elsewhere ==
Kōenji, an area of Tokyo, also has an Awa Dance Festival, modeled on Tokushima's, which was started in 1956 by urban migrants from Tokushima Prefecture. It is the second largest Awa Dance Festival in Japan, with an average of 188 groups composed of 12,000 dancers, attracting 1.2 million visitors.

The Japanese production company Tokyo Story produced a version of Awa Odori in 2015 in Paris by bringing dancers from Japan in order to promote Awa Odori and the Japanese "matsuri" culture abroad.

== In popular culture ==
Awa dance is a 2007 Japanese movie starring Nana Eikura. The festival is also prominently featured in the 2007 movie Bizan starring Matsushima Nanako. The novel series and anime Golden Time prominently features lead cast members along with their friends in their college club, the Japanese Festival Culture Research Society, performing the Awa dance multiple times during the story. Posters representing popular anime characters practicing the Awa dance are also printed every year for the festival. They featured "Fate/stay night", for example, in 2014.

In the 1994 Studio Ghibli film Heisei Tanuki Gassen Ponpoko (released as Pom Poko in English-speaking countries), during the scene where the film's tanuki use their transformation magic to put on a parade of yokai, part of their display includes a procession of tiny Awa dancers.

== See also ==
- Tourism in Japan
- Yosakoi
