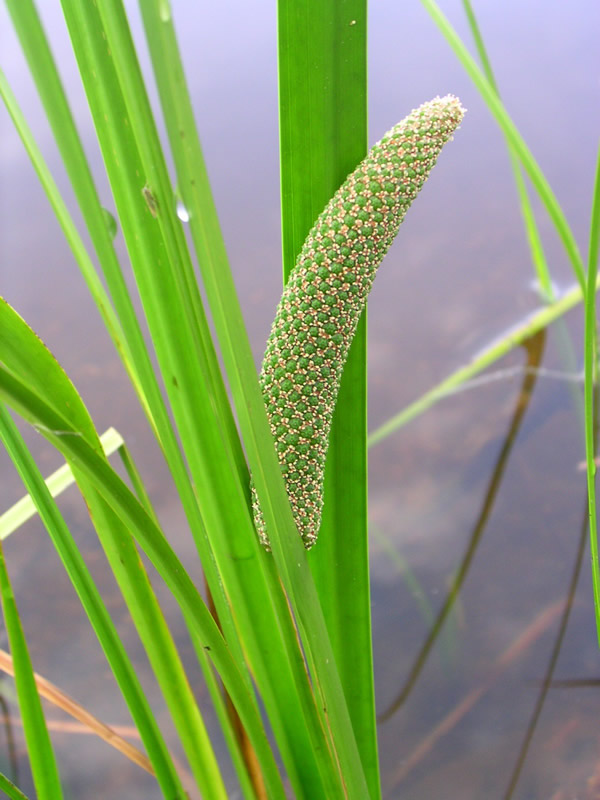

Conservation status
- Secure (NatureServe)

Scientific classification
- Kingdom: Plantae
- Clade: Tracheophytes
- Clade: Angiosperms
- Clade: Monocots
- Order: Acorales
- Family: Acoraceae
- Genus: Acorus
- Species: A. americanus

Binomial name
- Acorus americanus Raf.

= Acorus americanus =

American sweet flag

American sweet flag, a species of plant

Acorus americanus, the American sweet flag, is an emergent wetland plant native to the northern United States and Canada. This perennial plant has bright green blade-shaped leaves that arise directly from the rhizomes and sheath into each other at the base. Additionally the blades have 2–6 raised veins, and a swollen center when viewed in cross section. The foliage has a citrus-like spicy aromatic quality, and can be used to flavor beer. It is a flowering plant with inconspicuous flowers that are arranged on a lateral spadix (a thickened, fleshy axis) and the fertilized flowers produce berries with a jelly inside. This plant is protected as a state endangered species in Pennsylvania.

== Etymology ==
The name "Acorus" is derived from the Greek word 'acoron', a name used by Dioscorides, which in turn was derived from 'coreon', meaning 'pupil', because it was used in herbal medicine as a treatment for inflammation of the eye.

The species name, "americanus" simply indicates that this is an American species of this genus, differentiating it from the very similar European and western Asian species Acorus calamus.

== Taxonomy ==
Acorus americanus was formerly classified as Acorus calamus var. americanus. It differs only in being a fertile diploid (2n = 24)], whereas most of the A. calamus of Europe and Asia is a sterile triploid species, that only spreads asexually. Diploid plants in northern Asia may be representatives of A. americanus. Also as a diploid it does not produce β-asarone.

== Uses ==
This plant was used extensively by Native Americans and early European settlers.

== Chemistry ==
In 1968 the Food and Drug Administration banned Acorus calamus from being used as a food additive and as a medicinal as a result of lab studies that involved supplementing the diets of lab animals over a prolonged period of time with massive doses of isolated chemicals (β-asarone) from the Indian Jammu strain of Acorus calamus. The plant was labeled procarcinogenic. Wichtl says "It is not clear whether the observed carcinogenic effects in rats are relevant to the human organism." However, most sources advise caution in ingesting strains other than the diploid strain.

Like the diploid strains of Acorus calamus in parts of the Himalayas, Mongolia, and C Siberia, the Acorus americanus diploid strain does not contain the procarcinogenic β-asarone. Research has consistently demonstrated that "β-asarone was not detectable in the North American spontaneous diploid Acorus [Calamus var. Americanus]".

It is believed by some that calamus is a hallucinogen. This urban legend is based on two pages of a book written by Hoffer and Osmund entitled The Hallucinogens. The information on these two pages came from anecdotal reports from two individuals (a husband and wife) who reported that they had ingested calamus on a few occasions. None of the components in calamus are converted to TMA (trimethoxyamphetamine) in the human organism. To date there is no solid evidence of any hallucinogenic substances in Acorus calamus.

However, for Native Americans, specifically the Alberta Cree, it has been reported that "the root {was} chewed for the hallucinogenic effects," so perhaps more investigation is needed.

Calamus shows neuroprotective effect against stroke and chemically induced neurodegeneration in rats. Specifically, it has a protective effect against acrylamide induced neurotoxicity.
