= Nurikabe =

Yōkai in Japanese folklore

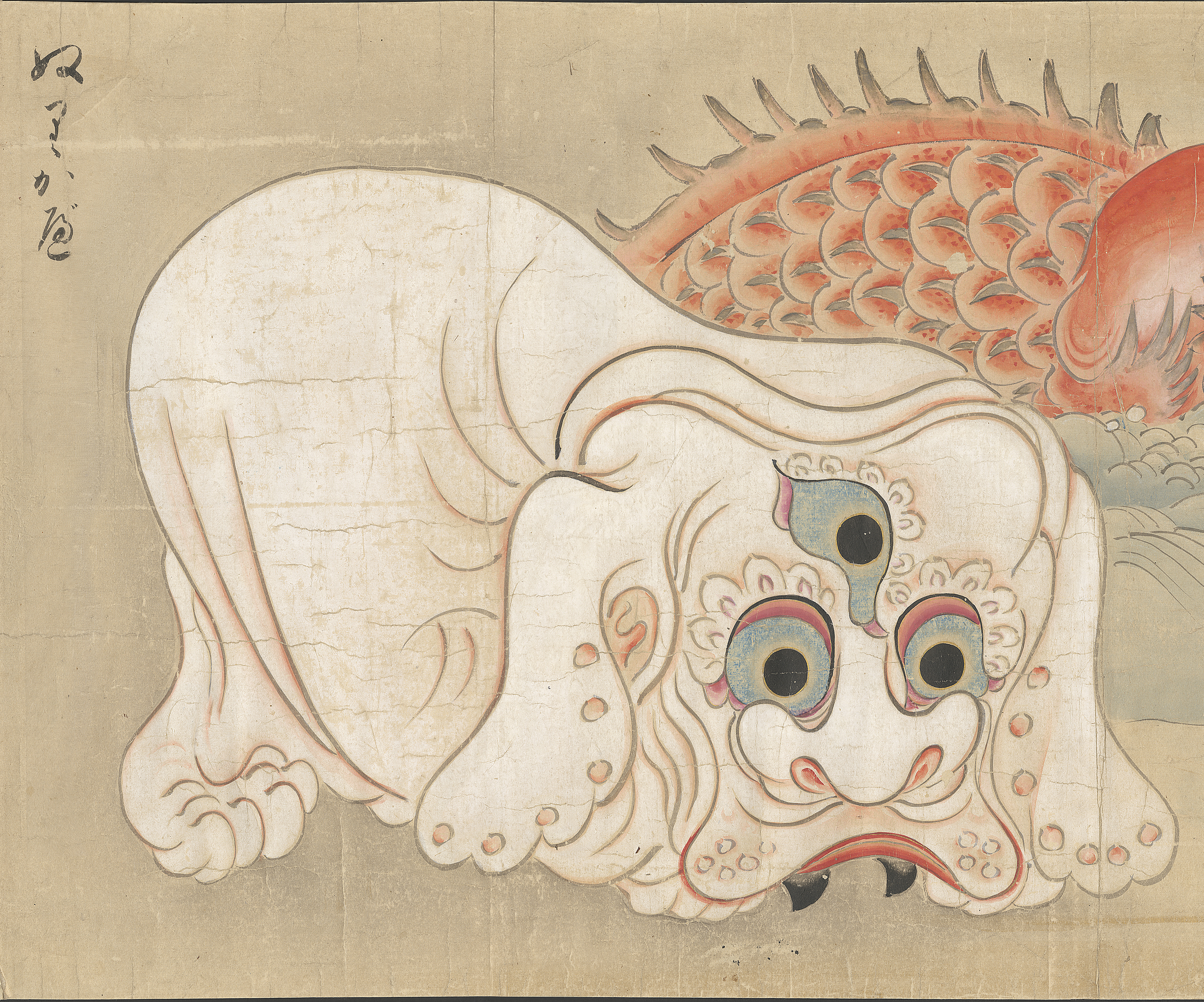
Illustrated beast labeled "Nurikabe" in the Bakemono no e picture scroll (c. 1660) ―Brigham Young University Library, Special Collections, the Harry F. Bruning Collection of Japanese Books and Manuscripts.

The nurikabe (塗り壁 or 塗壁, literally "plastered wall", (Note: Hence perhaps "The Wall" or "Mr. Wall", although this is not well-attested.)) is a yōkai (spirit/monster) from Japanese folklore.

It is said to manifest as an invisible wall that impedes or misdirects travelers walking at night. This yōkai is described as quite tall, to prevent people from climbing over it, and wide enough to dampen any attempts to go around it.

Japanese scholar and folklorist Kunio Yanagita recorded perhaps the most prominent early example of nurikabe and other yōkai in his books. Manga artist Shigeru Mizuki claims to have had a nurikabe-like experience, being stuck in coal tar in New Guinea, inspiring a nurikabe character in his manga Gegege no Kitarō.

It was thought that no pre-modern pictorial depictions of nurikabe existed until it was noticed in 2007 that a 17th century yōkai picture scroll held by Brigham Young University included a "white dog-elephant like creature" labeled as "nurikabe" (see figure at right) matching a later copy held in Japan.

== Mythology ==
The nurikabe takes the form of a wall—usually invisible—that blocks the path of travelers as they're walking. With the exception of Mizuki Shigeru's experience in New Guinea, most legends and accounts of nurikabe come from Kyūshū, in the Fukuoka and Ōita prefectures.

Specifically, folklorist Kunio Yanagita (1938) gives the following lore:

It is said in the sea coast of Onga County (kōri), Chikuzen Province (now district of the same name in Fukuoka Prefecture) that when one is walking a path at night, suddenly the destination one is going towards [i.e., the spot ahead] suddenly turns into a wall, and one becomes unable to go anywhere, as it happens sometimes. This [yōkai] is called the nurikabe and is held in fear. If one takes a stick and sweeps at the bottom, it goes away, but striking its top does nothing.

— Yanagita, Yōkai meii (妖怪名彙; "Yōkai Glossary", 1956 [1938]) (Note: The quote actually continues with the description of the nuribō under § Parallels below.)

Note the quoted text above does not explicitly refer to the wall's invisibility, so this is an aspect inferred by commentators.

Yanagita's writing on the nurikabe is thought to represent the earliest attestation of folklore record, or at least he is credited for making it widely known throughout Japan.

Some iterations of the legend say that trying to go around the wall is futile as it extends forever. It has been suggested that the legend of the nurikabe was created to explain travelers losing their bearings on long journeys.

=== Lore of Ōita ===
Some nurikabe-like experiences that have been recorded have been attributed as the doing of a tanuki (enchanted Japanese raccoon dog) in Ōita Prefecture. These happenings, instead of involving a wall, are instances where the traveler suddenly cannot see in front of themselves. This legendary phenomenon is referred to as "tanuki no nurikabe (狸の塗り壁; "racoon dog's plaster wall") The same phenomenon is called itachi no nurikabe (イタチの塗り壁; "weasel's plaster wall") locally in Kakaji (now incorporated into Bungotakada, Ōita).

Superstition tells that the tanuki erects a "blind wall" by outspreading its scrotum into a wide sheet, blocking the nighttime traveler's field of vision. (Note: The tanuki having is a common trope. The creature's outstretched scrotum is said to measure hachijōjiki (八畳敷; "eight tatami mats"), as explained in an old Urokogata-ya version of Bunbuku Chagama.) Either the raccoon dog's or the weasel's nurikabe wall can be defeated by sitting down in place and smoking a puff of tobacco, (Note: Traditionally the Japanese would use a pipe called the kiseru.) then the traveler's vision will be restored, and he is able to resume his journey.

There is a tradition of nurikabe folklore in Usuki, Ōita as well. (Note: Besides the Ōita ken shi: Minzoku-hen (prefectural history) already cited, Usuki shidan (臼杵史談; "Discourse on Usuki's history", 1968) is cited as a source of nurikabe material.) Usuki is known for abura shikkui ("oil plaster"), a proprietary plastering technique, and walls administered this kind of coating will repel water, whose weird appearance may have originally inspired the nurikabe monster, according to one theory.

Minamiamabe District, Ōita (now incorporated into Saiki city) has a folk legend that the nurikabe appears on a sloped path named Shichi-magari ("Seven Bends"), accompanied by another yōkai called azuki-togi ("adzuki bean washer"). When a person is walking along at night, the nurikabe appears suddenly and the view ahead completely darkens. Its true identity is a tanuki, which hops on to the back knot of the obi around the person's kimono, then covers the person's eyes with its forepaws. Hence, the way to avoid this misfortune is to tie the obi in such a way as to prevent the beast from riding it.

== Iconography ==
=== Yokai picture scroll ===
(Bakemono no e and Bakemono zukushi emaki)

An illustration labeled as "nurikabe" of a three-eyed quadruped white creature (Note: "white dog-elephant-like creature".) (see top image) was found in Brigham Young University's Bakemono no e (化物之繪; "Illustrations of Supernatural Creatures") picture scroll (which some date to c. 1660), held by the BYU Harold B. Lee Library under the L. Tom Perry Special Collections Library's Harry F. Bruning collection of Yōkai folklorist Michael Dylan Foster thinks this creature resembles an elephant, though the later copy (described below) is considered to look like a (stylized) lion or dog by Japanese commentators.

Thus, a near identical, but unlabeled, later copy of this painting exists (with different coloration) in a picture scroll belonging to Kōichi Yumoto. (Note: Yumoto is a renowned yōkai folklorist and collector/museum operator.) and this unlabeled beast can now be characterized as another "nurikabe" painting by comparison conducted in January 2007. Yumoto's scroll was painted by Kanō Yoshinobu (由信) of the Kanō school in the year 1802/Kyōwa 2 dated on the colophon of the scroll. The "discovery" was made in January 2007 when Associate Professor Lawrence Marceau of the University of Auckland carried photographic data of the BYU scroll and visited Yumoto to make comparison. Subsequently in August 2007, Yumoto announced the exhibition of his picture scroll illustration now identified as "nurikabe". (Note: Yumoto at the time was the head of the curator department at the Kawasaki City Museum.)

Before this "discovery", pre-modern depiction of the nurikabe was thought not to exist. Manga artist Shigeru Mizuki called the find "significant" or "important yōkai national treasure"。After 2007, the visual depiction of nurikabe circulating around Japan changed completely, from the flat wall creature with eyes, arms and legs depicted by Mizuki, to this "white dog-elephant-like creature". Mizuki's version was solely based on his imagination and written folklore (cf. § Mizuki's manga below)

But some Japanese scholars are not convinced this image actually depicts the same nurikabe known by the oral lore of Kyushu. Writer-researchers Natsuhiko Kyogoku, Katsumi Tada, Kenji Murakami and journalist Osamu Kato of Asahi Shimbun held a panel discussion published in the periodical Kwai, which rendered opinion that it is unclear whether the scroll picture nurikabe and the oral folklore nurikabe are the one and the same.

One theory is that nurikabe is a homonym for completely different yōkai, and the name match merely coincidence. Another possibility is that the picture labeled "nurikabe" or just nurikabe's name alone circulated to the Kyushu region, and was forcibly matched with local lore that seemed to fit. Folklorist Kazuhiko Komatsu et al. (2009) also deem as "uncertain" the exact relationship between the scroll picture and the nurikabe of Yanagita's folklore.

=== Inō Heitarō's adventure ===
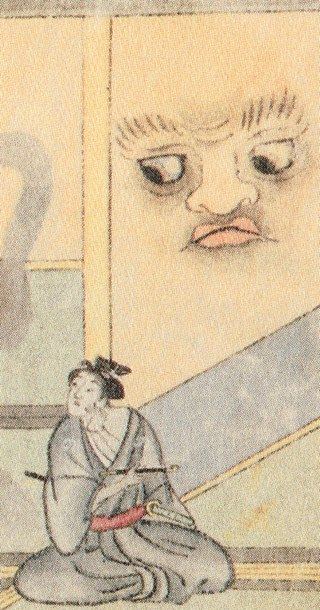
A monstrosity on a wall depicted in the Inō mononoke roku (1749).

In the Edo Period illustrated yōkai narrative Inō mononokeroku ("Record of strange occurrences in the Inō household", 1749)), there is a scene where a face with eyes and a mouth appears on the wall and glares at the person. There had been advanced theories in the past that this "face on the wall" (Note: Nakamura claims this wall yokai is not captioned with any name. But Kuramoto claims this being is called Kabe no katachi (壁の形地, en; "wall shape"?) in the text, though it perhaps states sono katachi (其形地, en; "that shape"). Fujihara's thesis calls it kabe no kao (壁の顔; "face of/on the wall").) might be the traceable origin of the nurikabe.

On the 30th day of the 7th lunar month (Inō Heitarō is haunted every day this month), the protagonist is met with a mass of ash (in the form of a humanlike head) which spews a herd of earthworms (which Heitarō hated), and the wall nearby has sprouted eyes and a mouth, laughing.

This "face in the wall" is related to hitobashira (human sacrifice for buildings) (Note: hitobashira is literally "human pillar", human sacrifice buried in the foundation, etc., of built structures.) according to literary critic Shirō Kuramoto, as it is quite conceivable for a sacrificed human to be plastered into the wall. Though Kuramoto is not referring to the nurikabe monster itself but rather nurikabe (plaster wall) as a construction technique, a somewhat similar line of thought is already seen in the theory that the nurikabe monster originated from walls finished with so-called the "oil plaster" of Usuki city (see above).

=== Mizuki's manga ===
The yōkai manga author Shigeru Mizuki created the character Nurikabe, a large wall with eyes, hands and feet (see fig. under § In popular culture below). The visualization was strictly the invention of Mizuki's mind, except that he relied on Yanagita's folklore that the "wall appears" ahead (tr. Foster). So this Nurikabe is essentially a folk legend based fictional character.

== Parallels ==
The nuribō of Iki Island (administered by Nagasaki Prefecture) is considered a similar creature. It is said to jut out from the side of the mountain next to the road at night.

=== Nobusuma ===
The nobusuma (野襖; lit. "field fusuma") is a yōkai which in some versions has been likened to the nurikabe. The nobusuma down south from Tokyo in the Shikoku region, in Tanokuchi village, Hata District, Kōchi, purportedly blocks the way and it is so expansive, there is apparently no end to it whether you seek up and down or sideways. When blocked, the traveler needs to calm down and smoke his tobacco. (Note: Aramata & Ōya (2021) is likely confused in localizing the same legend as occurring in the Kantō region, around Tokyo.)

Hiroshi Aramata comments that the above creature should be distinguished from another nobusuma (野套; lit. "field quilt/bedding") (pronounced the same but written differently), the other type, according to legend around the Tokyo area, flies up to humans and covers their eyes. But that tactic does resemble the eye-hiding by the tanuki that rides the obi sash behind a person's back, described above. In fact, another yōkai reference considers the nobusuma a kindred or subtype of the fūri (風狸) which would generally be construed in Japan to mean "wind tanuki". (Note: In the original Chinese however, fengli (風貍), correctly means "wind leopard cat" i.e., a spotted type of Asian wildcat.) More specifically, the nobusuma is said to glide through the air by night, latch onto the back of a mountain hiker, cover his eyes and mouth, and suck the blood. The nobusuma is illustrated and annotated by Toriyama Sekien (in his Konjaku Gazu Zoku Hyakki, 1779), where he describes it as "essentially a flying squirrel (musasabi)", which eats nuts and fire.

=== Tsuitate-danuki and Kayatsuri-tanuki ===
In the neighboring prefecture within the same Shikoku region, similar lore exists concerning the tanuki that blocks the way using other pieces of furniture as impediments, namely the tsuitate-danuki using a tsuitate (portable partition) as screen, and the kayatsuri-tanuki which hangs a mosquito net. Both are legends of Mima, Tokushima.

=== Echizen Province tanuki ===
The tanuki of Itoshiro village, Echizen Province (now mostly incorporated into Gujō, Gifu with the remainder in Ōno, Fukui), was credited with using a similar tactic of propping up a fusuma (screen panel) to hinder the wayfarer's path. (Cf. § Nobusuma, § Tsuitate-danuki, § Kayatsuri-tanuki above).

== In popular culture ==
External image
- Bronze statue of nurikabe. Mizuki Shigeru Road.

There is a nurikabe character named Nurikabe in Shigeru Mizuki's manga series Gegege no Kitarō. This manga-version of nurikabe (dating from the second half of the 20th century) is depicted as a visible, solid wall with hands, feet and eyes, somewhat anthropomorphically. The character's main function is to be a shield in order to protect other members of the Kitarō family. Mizuki attributes much of his inspiration for the series to an experience he had with a nurikabe in New Guinea during World War II, as well as to the writings of Kunio Yanagita.

== See also ==
- List of legendary creatures from Japan
- Bai Ze - or hakutaku in Japanese, has a 3-eyed white beast form, with extra eyes on its body
- Kudan (yōkai) - prophecy beast, sometime compared to hakutaku, variant kutabe (phonetically rhymes with nurikabe or shikkui kabe for plaster wall)
- Baku (mythology) - dream-eating beast-type creature, depicted as a stylized tapir
- Shen (clam-monster) - a mirage-spewing dragon or clam monster
- Ghosts building a wall - Chinese folklore referring to ghosts blocking the paths of travelers at night
