= Ghosts building a wall =

Chinese idiom

In Chinese folklore, ghosts building a wall (simplified Chinese: 鬼打墙; traditional Chinese: 鬼打牆; pinyin: Guǐ dǎ qiáng; lit. 'ghosts beating the wall') refers to ghosts trapping people in a certain area at night. There is a folktale about a traveler who walks in circles, as if ghosts continually built walls to block his intended path. In some descriptions, real walls or trees appear. The conventional solution is to stop, cover one's face with one's hands, then look again to see that the way is clear.

The contemporary Chinese artist Xu Bing referenced this folktale with his artwork Ghosts Pounding the Wall in 1988. With a crew of workers, he took ink impressions of the Great Wall of China and displayed them in the United States.

== See also ==
- Nurikabe
