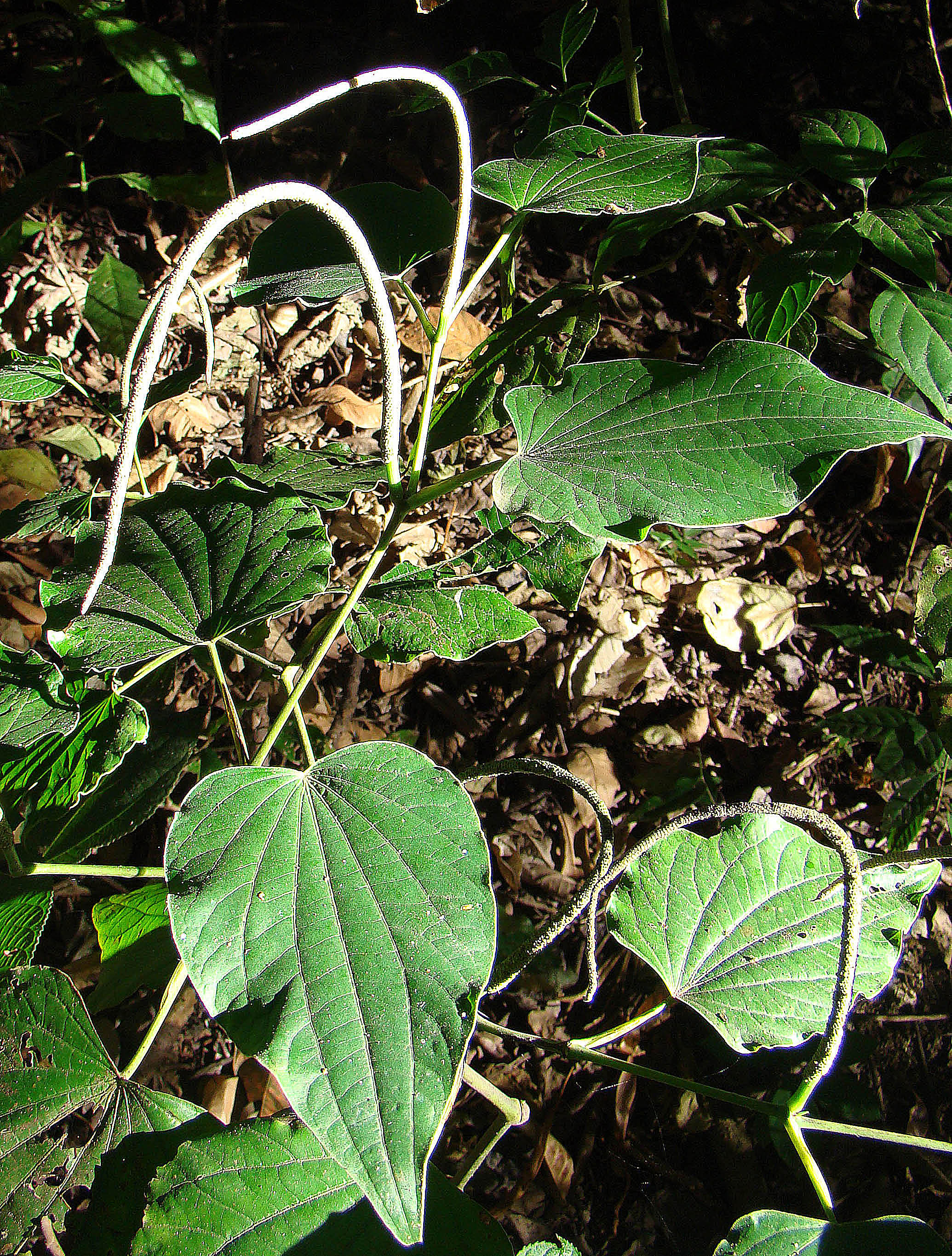

Scientific classification
- Kingdom: Plantae
- Clade: Tracheophytes
- Clade: Angiosperms
- Clade: Magnoliids
- Order: Piperales
- Family: Piperaceae
- Genus: Piper
- Species: P. marginatum

Binomial name
- Piper marginatum Jacq.

Synonyms
- Schilleria marginata; Artanthe marginata; P. caudatum; Schilleria caudata; Artanthe caudata; P. anisatum

= Piper marginatum =

Species of flowering plant

Piper marginatum, the cake bush, Anesi wiwiri, marigold pepper, Ti Bombé in Creole or Hinojo, is a plant species in the genus Piper found in moist, shady spots in the Amazon rainforest in Surinam, French Guiana and Brazil.

The leaves contain flavonoids such as vitexin and marginatoside (6 -O-β gentiobiosyl vitexin). The plant also contains 3,4-Methylenedioxypropiophenone, 2,4,5-Trimethoxypropiophenone, 2-Methoxy-4,5-methylenedioxypropiophenone, 1-(3,4-Methylenedioxyphenyl)propan-1-ol (Marginatumol), 5,4′-Dihydroxy-7-methoxyflavanone and 5,7-Dihydroxy-4′-methoxyflavanone.

An essential oil can be produced from the plant showing deterrent and larvicidal activities against Aedes aegypti.
