= 2,4,5-Trimethoxypropiophenone =

- 2,4,5-Trimethoxypropiophenone's chemical structure

Names
- Preferred IUPAC name 1-(3,4,5-Trimethoxyphenyl)propan-1-one
- Other names Isoacoramone; 2,4,5-Trimethoxypropiophenone

Identifiers
CAS Number	3904-18-5
3D model (JSmol)	Interactive image
Beilstein Reference	4-08-00-02746
ChemSpider	610798
PubChem CID	700861
UNII	8Y8GHA2Y2N
CompTox Dashboard (EPA)	DTXSID60351464
- InChI: InChI=1S/C12H16O4/c1-5-9(13)8-6-11(15-3)12(16-4)7-10(8)14-2/h6-7H,5H2,1-4H3 Key: KUQHFNICKXWOBZ-UHFFFAOYSA-N; InChI=1S/C12H16O4/c1-5-9(13)8-6-10(14-2)12(16-4)11(7-8)15-3/h6-7H,5H2,1-4H3 Key: FNFSOYGIQWSIEX-UHFFFAOYSA-N
- SMILES: CCC(=O)C1=CC(=C(C(=C1)OC)OC)OC

Properties
Chemical formula	C_{12}H_{16}O_{4}
Molar mass	224.256 g·mol^{−1}
Melting point	109 °C (228 °F; 382 K)
Boiling point	186 °C (367 °F; 459 K)
- Except where otherwise noted, data are given for materials in their standard state (at 25 °C [77 °F], 100 kPa). Infobox references

2,4,5-Trimethoxypropiophenone is a natural phenylpropanoid and precursor in the synthesis of α-asarone.

== Natural occurrence ==
2,4,5-Trimethoxypropiophenone is a component of several plant species' essential oils. The chemical has been identified in Piper marginatum, Acorus tatarinowii, and Asarum maximum.
