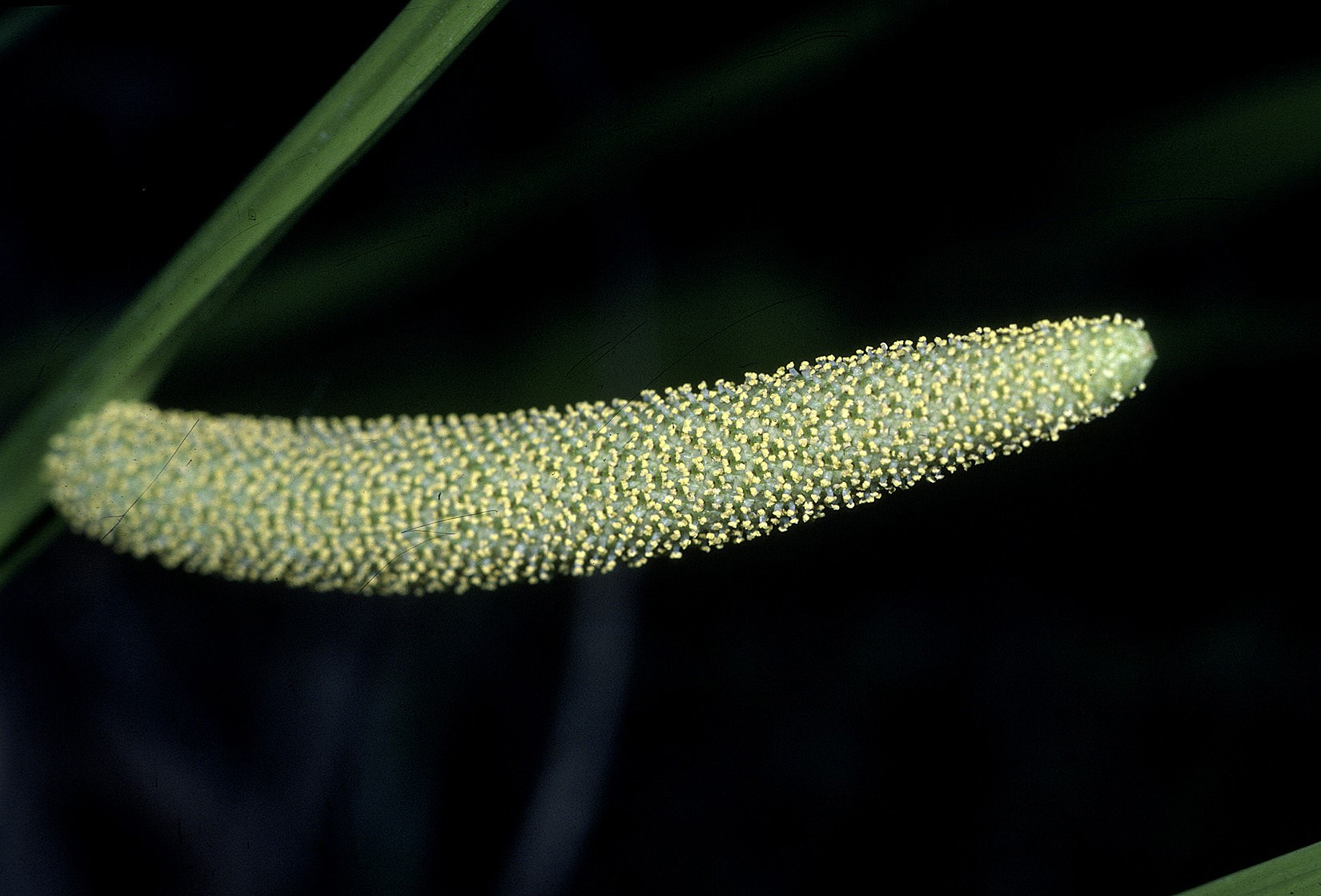
- Sweet flag Acorus calamus - spadix

Scientific classification
- Kingdom: Plantae
- Clade: Tracheophytes
- Clade: Angiosperms
- Clade: Monocots
- Order: Acorales; Reveal
- Family: Acoraceae; Martinov
- Genus: Acorus; L.

Synonyms
- Calamus Garsault

= Acorus =

Genus of aquatic plants

Acorus is a genus of monocot flowering plants. This genus was once placed within the family Araceae (aroids), but more recent classifications place it in its own family Acoraceae and order Acorales, of which it is the sole genus of the oldest surviving line of monocots. Some older studies indicated that it was placed in a lineage (the order Alismatales), that also includes aroids (Araceae), Tofieldiaceae, and several families of aquatic monocots (e.g., Alismataceae, Posidoniaceae). However, modern phylogenetic studies demonstrate that Acorus is sister to all other monocots. Common names include calamus and sweet flag.

The genus is native to North America and northern and eastern Asia, and naturalised in southern Asia and Europe from ancient cultivation. The known wild populations are diploid except for some tetraploids in eastern Asia, while the cultivated plants are sterile triploids, probably of hybrid origin between the diploid and tetraploid forms.

== Characteristics ==
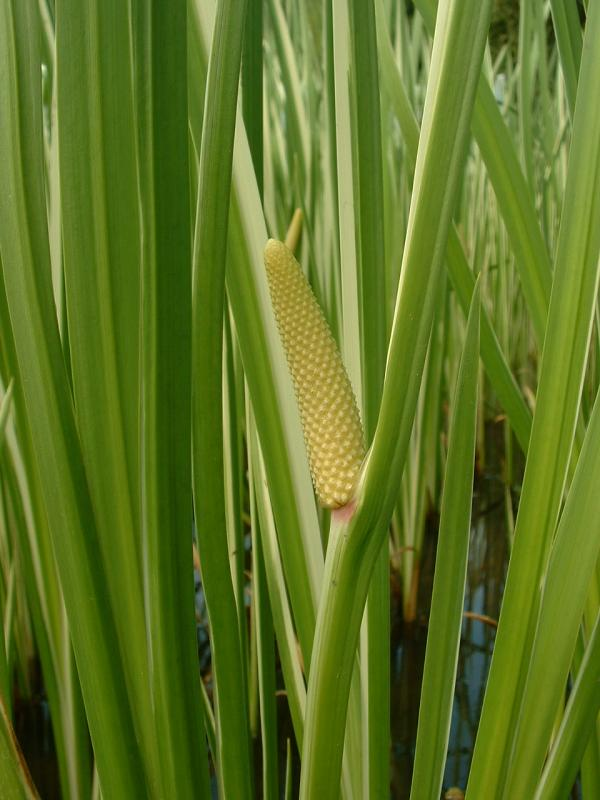
Habit of Acorus calamus.

The inconspicuous flowers are arranged on a lateral spadix (a thickened, fleshy axis). Unlike aroids, there is no spathe (large bract, enclosing the spadix). The spadix is 4–10 cm long and is enclosed by the foliage. The bract can be ten times longer than the spadix. The leaves are linear with entire margin. Acorus species exhibit an unusual anatomical feature among monocots in that they lack typical vessel elements in their xylem, relying instead on tracheids for water transport, a trait considered evolutionarily primitive.

== Taxonomy ==
Although the family Acoraceae was originally described in 1820, since then Acorus has traditionally been included in Araceae in most classification systems, as in the Cronquist system. The family has recently been resurrected as molecular systematic studies have shown that Acorus is not closely related to Araceae or any other monocot family, leading plant systematists to place the genus and family in its own order. This placement currently lacks support from traditional plant morphology studies, and some taxonomists still place it as a subfamily of Araceae, in the order Alismatales. The APG III system recognizes order Acorales, distinct from the Alismatales, and as the sister group to all other monocots. This relationship is confirmed by more recent phylogenetic studies. Treatment in the APG IV system is unchanged from APG III.

=== Species ===
In older literature and on many websites, there is still much confusion, with the name Acorus calamus equally but wrongly applied to Acorus americanus (formerly Acorus calamus var. americanus).

The Kew Checklist accepts 4 species within the genus Acorus:

- Acorus calamus L. – common sweet flag; sterile triploid (3n = 36); probably of cultivated origin. It is native to Irtysh River valley, Kazakhstan but has been widely cultivated and naturalised elsewhere including Europe, eastern North America, temperate India and the Himalayas and southern Asia.
- Acorus americanus Raf. - Canada, northern United States, Siberia to Inner Mongolia.
- Acorus gramineus Sol. ex Aiton – Japanese sweet flag or grassy-leaved sweet flag; fertile diploid (2n = 18); - China, Himalayas, Japan, Korea, Indochina, Philippines, Primorye.
- Acorus verus Raf. - Native to central Asia to Russian Far East and Japan. Introduced to India and South-East Asia.

Acorus from Kazakhstan, Europe, China and Japan have been planted in the United States.

=== Etymology ===
The name 'acorus' is derived from the Greek word 'acoron', a name used by Dioscorides, which in turn was derived from 'coreon', meaning 'pupil', because it was used in herbal medicine as a treatment for inflammation of the eye.

== Distribution and habitat ==
These plants are found in wetlands, particularly marshes, where they spread by means of thick rhizomes. Like many other marsh plants, they depend upon aerenchyma to transport oxygen to the rooting zone. They frequently occur on shorelines and floodplains where water levels fluctuate seasonally.

== Ecology ==
The native North American species appears in many ecological studies. Compared to other species of wetland plants, they have relatively high competitive ability. Although many marsh plants accumulate large banks of buried seeds, seed banks of Acorus may not accumulate in some wetlands owing to low seed production. The seeds appear to be adapted to germinate in clearings; after a period of cold storage, the seeds will germinate after seven days of light with fluctuating temperature, and somewhat longer under constant temperature. A comparative study of its life history traits classified it as a "tussock interstitial", that is, a species that has a dense growth form and tends to occupy gaps in marsh vegetation, not unlike Iris versicolor.

== Toxicity ==
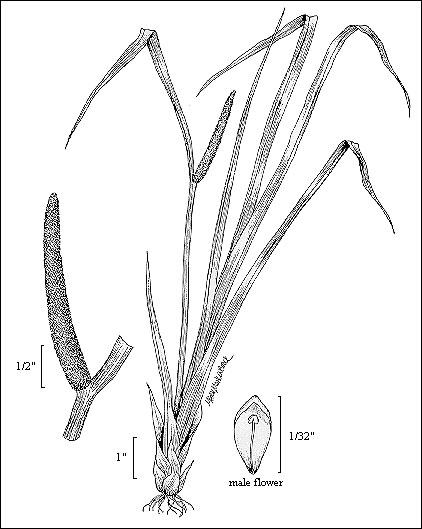
Sweet Flag (2006 drawing by USGS Northern Prairie Wildlife Research Center)

Products derived from Acorus calamus were banned in 1968 as food additives by the United States Food and Drug Administration. The primary chemical responsible for the plant's toxic and carcinogenic effects is β-asarone. Confusion exists whether all strains of A. calamus contain this substance.

Four varieties of A. calamus strains exist in nature: diploid, triploid, tetraploid and hexaploid. Diploids do not produce the carcinogenic β-asarone. Diploids are known to grow naturally in Eastern Asia (Mongolia and C Siberia) and North America. The triploid cytotype probably originated in the Himalayan region, as a hybrid between the diploid and tetraploid cytotypes. The North American Calamus is known as Acorus calamus var. americanus or more recently as simply Acorus americanus. Like the diploid strains of A. calamus in parts of the Himalayas, Mongolia, and C Siberia, the North American diploid strain does not contain the carcinogenic β-asarone. Research has consistently demonstrated that "β-asarone was not detectable in the North American spontaneous diploid Acorus [calamus var. americanus]".

== Uses ==
The parallel-veined leaves of some species contain ethereal oils that give a sweet scent when dried. Fine-cut leaves used to be strewn across the floor in the Middle Ages, both for the scent, and for presumed efficacy against pests.

== Bibliography ==
- Govaerts, R. & Frodin, D.G. (2002). World Checklist and Bibliography of Araceae and Acoraceae. 1–560. The Board of Trustees of the Royal Botanic Gardens, Kew.
- Flora of North America: Acoraceae
- Acorales in Stevens, P. F. (2001 onwards). Angiosperm Phylogeny Website. Version 7, May 2006.
- NCBI Taxonomy Browser
- AcoraceaeAcoraceae in L. Watson and M.J. Dallwitz (1992 onwards) The families of flowering plants: descriptions, illustrations, identification, information retrieval. Version: 27 April 2006. http://delta-intkey.com.
- Taxonomy and distribution of Acorus in Maine
- Platt, Karen. Gold Fever 2004 ISBN 978-0954576417
- Phylogenetic analysis of rbcL sequences identifies Acorus calamus as the primal extant monocotyledon. Duvall 1993
- Duvall, Melvin R.; Clegg, Michael T.; Chase, Mark W.; Clark, W. Dennis; Kress, W. John; Hills, Harold G.; Eguiarte, Luis E.; Smith, James F.; Gaut, Brandon S.; Zimmer, Elizabeth A.; Learn, Gerald H. (1 January 1993). "Phylogenetic Hypotheses for the Monocotyledons Constructed from rbcL Sequence Data" (PDF). Annals of the Missouri Botanical Garden. 80 (3): 607–619. Bibcode:1993AnMBG..80..607D. doi:10.2307/2399849. JSTOR 2399849.
- Analysis of Acorus calamus Chloroplast Genome and Its Phylogenetic Implications Vadim V. Goremykin 2005
- Givnish, Thomas J.; Ames, Mercedes; McNeal, Joel R.; McKain, Michael R.; Steele, P. Roxanne; dePamphilis, Claude W.; Graham, Sean W.; Pires, J. Chris; Stevenson, Dennis W.; Zomlefer, Wendy B.; Briggs, Barbara G.; Duvall, Melvin R.; Moore, Michael J.; Heaney, J. Michael; Soltis, Douglas E.; Soltis, Pamela S.; Thiele, Kevin; Leebens-Mack, James H. (27 December 2010). "Assembling the Tree of the Monocotyledons: Plastome Sequence Phylogeny and Evolution of Poales". Annals of the Missouri Botanical Garden. 97 (4): 584–616. Bibcode:2010AnMBG..97..584G. doi:10.3417/2010023. S2CID 15036227.
- Soltis, D. E.; Smith, S. A.; Cellinese, N.; Wurdack, K. J.; Tank, D. C.; Brockington, S. F.; Refulio-Rodriguez, N. F.; Walker, J. B.; Moore, M. J.; Carlsward, B. S.; Bell, C. D.; Latvis, M.; Crawley, S.; Black, C.; Diouf, D.; Xi, Z.; Rushworth, C. A.; Gitzendanner, M. A.; Sytsma, K. J.; Qiu, Y.-L.; Hilu, K. W.; Davis, C. C.; Sanderson, M. J.; Beaman, R. S.; Olmstead, R. G.; Judd, W. S.; Donoghue, M. J.; Soltis, P. S. (8 April 2011). "Angiosperm phylogeny: 17 genes, 640 taxa". American Journal of Botany. 98 (4): 704–730. Bibcode:2011AmJB...98..704S. doi:10.3732/ajb.1000404. hdl:2027.42/142064. PMID 21613169.
