= Nobusuma =

Yōkai

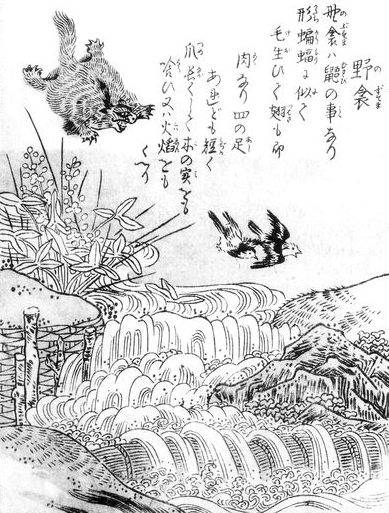
The nobusuma by Toriyama Sekien, Konjaku Gazu Zoku Hyakki (1779)

A nobusuma (野衾) (lit. "field bedding") or tobikura (飛倉) is a type of flying or sky-gliding yōkai monster, whose lore is localized in the Edo (now Tokyo), which some say is a transmuted bat, and others a flying squirrel.

It may latch onto a human from and cover his eyes and mouth, perhaps to suck blood. It attacks animals to feed on their blood, according to other sources. It is also said to consume fruits or tree-nuts. As for it allegedly consuming flame (or smoke from a fire), a source explains that it engages in a sort of fire-eating and -breathing behavior after chomping the tip off a lit torch.

According to the transmutation theorists, it starts off as bat, but with age eventually becomes a nobusuma, then later another yōkai named yamachichi (lit. "mountain father"); this yamachichi is characterized as a vampire due to its habit of sucking the breath out of a sleeper and even cause death.

== Etymology ==
The name nobusuma (野衾) translates to "field bedding", where fusuma is also glossed as either "kakebuton" (the top cover futon (Note: i.e. a "quilt" cover bedding, akin to comforter.) or "night robe". The word is thought to derive from fusu mo (伏す裳; lit. "lying-down/sleeping gown"). (Note: Note that fusu (伏す) could mean "lie down, recline", "lie flat, take cover". The 伏 also recurs in 伏翼 (pinyin: fuyi, lit. "reposed/foldable wing") as an alternate Chinese name for "bat" in a broad sense, evidently including flying squirrels.)

== Mythology ==
The nobusuba of this type is said to be part of the folklore of Edo (now Tokyo). (Note: A different type of nobusuma is the one known in the Shikoku area, which should be distinguished according to Hiroshi Aramata. That type erects a fusuma panel to block or blind passerby, and considered a subtype of nurikabe. The two may be confused or conflated.)

=== As flying squirrel ===
This nobusuma is essentially a giant flying squirrel (musasabi) according to Toriyama Sekien in his Konjaku Gazu Zoku Hyakki ( 1779), and he illustrated the creature like a flying squirrel, though his text states it resembles a bat, with fur growing on it, equipped with fleshy wings. (Note: Japanese: "野套（のぶすま）は鼯（むささび）の異なり。形蝙蝠に似て、毛生（お）ひて翅（つばさ）も即[（すなわち）]肉なり。(cont.)", whereas English translated "webbed wings" is a construed, not faithfully according to text.). It purportedly ate nuts and flames. (Note: (Cont.) Japanese: "四の足あれども短く爪長くして、木の実をも喰らひ、又は火焔をもくへり。")

Sekien has a separate entry for another yōkai called momonjī (百々爺; "hundred old man"), which in his opinion is a name composed partly of "momonga" for "Japanese dwarf flying squirrel", which he asserts is also called nobusuma. (Note: Sekien's thinks momonjī is composite of momonga and Gagoji (元興寺), a sort of bogeyman name invoked to silence crying children, in the Kyoto area.) (Note: Aramata states that Momongā (モモンガ―) was used as an invective to frighten children well into the post-war (post-1940s).)). This creature transforms into an elderly human after dark when certain conditions are met: a foggy and windy night when no one is watching; this momonjī causes the traveler it subsequently encounters to fall ill. (Note: Japanese: "百々爺（ももんじい）未詳。愚按ずるに、..)

Sekien's caption more or less matches Kikuoka Senryō's commentaries in Honchō seji danki (Kyōho 19/1734). (Note: Kikuoka Senryō (1841) Honchō seji danki (『本朝世事談綺』) also called Kindai seji jidan (『近代世事談』), Book 5, fol. 17 §Miscellany 雑事門 "Momongwa 摸々具和（ももんぐわ）" and "Gagōji 元興寺".) Here it is stated that the nobusuma eats fruits. It also slices off (the end) and extinguishes the torch a human is carrying at night, then breathes that same fire, and is feared on that account. This work merely states that the fleshy wing when folded resembles the bat's wings, and does not suggest it resembles a bat overall.

=== Bat-type, vampire ===
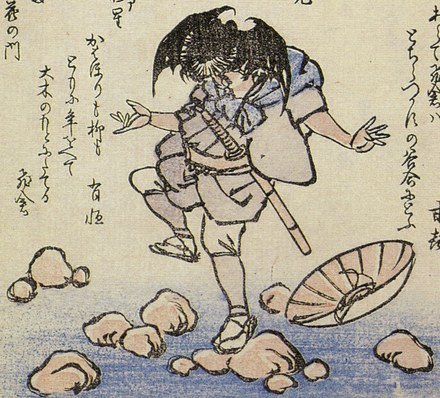
The tobikura . ―Illustrated by Ryōsai Kanjin Masajumi (竜斎閑人正澄) in Kyōka Hyaku Monogatari (1853).

Yet according to the Ehon Hyaku Monogatari (published 1841) attributed to Tōka Sanijin and illustrated by Takehara Shunsen, an aging bat first turns into nobusuma then later into another monster called the yamachichi (山地乳; lit. "mountain father"), which would suck the breath out of sleeping men. This results in death if yamachichi's deed is unwitnessed, but has the opposite effect of lengthening the victim's life if spotted by another human. Due to its nature of apparently feeding on humans, it is characterized as a "vampire" by an early 20th century English commentator.

A legend in the Baiō zuihitsu (梅翁随筆) (Note: Kansei era, 1789–1801).) collection claims that in the year 1798 (Kansei 10), a weasel-like winged beast was responsible for attacks on cats in Edo. It was caught, and had right and left wings of a sort, but not quite really wings at that. Someone identified the body as that of nobusuma which dwelt in the deep mountains.

The same bat-like monster is called a tobikura (飛倉; lit. "flying warehouse") and was purported to cover over the face of humans, according to the Kyōka Hyaku Monogatari (1853) illustrated by Ryōsai Kanjin Masajumi (竜斎閑人正澄). The nobusuma is also said to fly onto a person, and cover his eyes and mouth. It is even said that while the nobusama blindfolds and gags the victim (with its forepaws), it will suck the blood out of the traveler it spots on a mountain path.

== Iconography ==
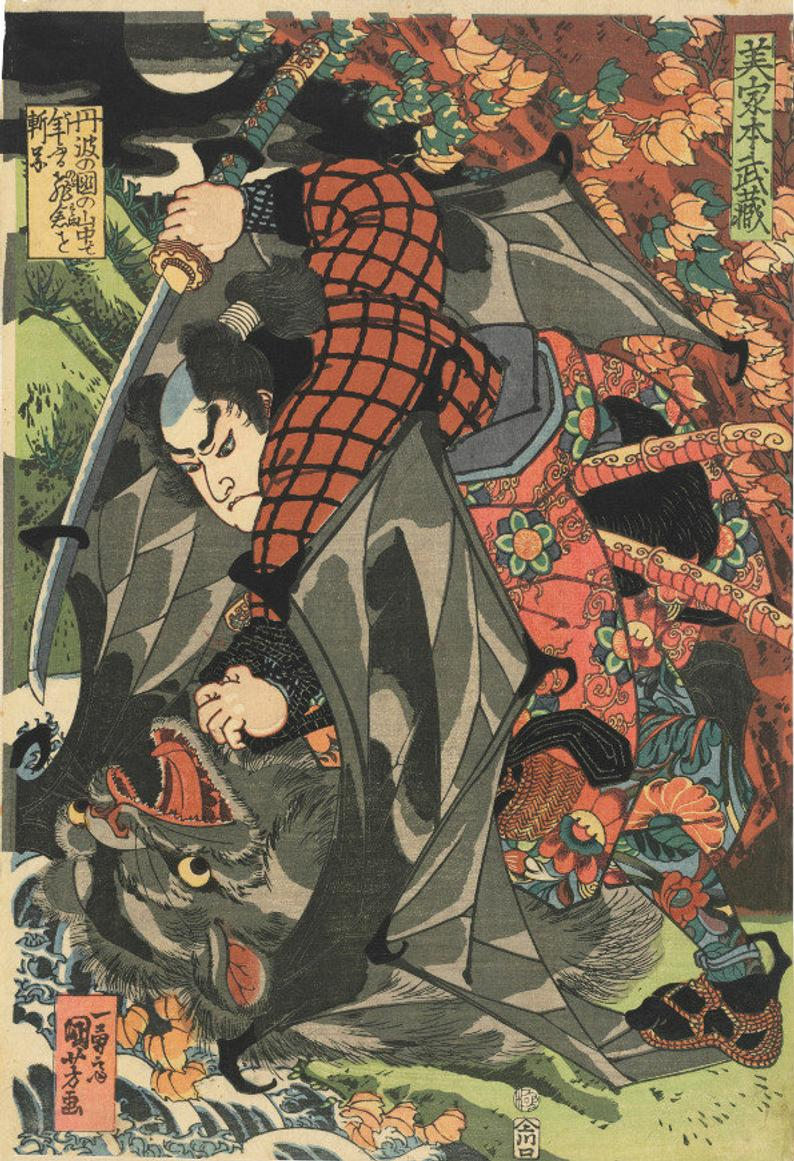
―"Miyamoto Musashi slashing the aged nobusuma in Tanba Province. (Note: Japanese: "美家本武蔵 丹波の国の山中にて年ふる野衾を斬図". The name is actually changed from the correct surname "宮本", though still pronounced "Miyamoto".) by Utagawa Kuniyoshi.

As already alluded, the nobusuma has been illustrated by Sekien (1779). and by Shunsen in Ehon Hyaku Monogatari (1841/Tenpō 12).

And the tobikura was depicted covering up the face of a person in Kyōka Hyaku Monogatari (1853/Kaei 6), painted by Ryōsai Kanjin (cf. fig. above).

Ukiyo-e artist Utagawa Kuniyoshi has depicted swordsman Miyamoto Musashi eradicating a bat-like nobusuma in the mountains (Musashi series, c. 1826-27/Bunsei 9-10). There is no historical basis for this, except that his training did take him all over the country.

== Derivation ==
Sekien's illustration explains in caption that the nobusuma Is essentially a flying squirrel, as already noted. A musasabi (Japanese giant flying squirrel) burrows inside hollowed trees by day, and comes out at night to glide through the air. Such spooky conduct may have inspired an actual mammal being treated as a type of yōkai. Since musasabi or the momonga (Japanese dwarf flying squirrel) both have acute night vision, it could be blinded by bright torch or lantern light in the dark, causing it to latch on to humans. Such behavior could be mistaken for a yōkai attack experience, and spread by word of mouth.

The encyclopedia Wakan Sansai Zue (1712) has an entry for the beast, read as both musasabi and nobusuma (Note: The kanji 鼯鼠 read as 「むささひ」 「のふすま」). It explains: "the name nobusuma is colloquial, while it is called momoka (毛毛加) [sic] in the Kantō region, and itaojiki (板折敷) in the western provinces". It is described as practically resembling a rat in fur color and shape, with fleshy wings. Then the encyclopedia defers the detailed description to the entry for "bats" (Note: The Chinese name for bat 伏翼 is used.) under the "land bird category" volume.

The actual relevant entry is not "bats", but the next one for "flying squirrel", more specifically: "musasabi/nobusuma/momi/momoka" (鸓鼠, Chinese] (pinyin) leishu; (romaji): rui chui). (Note: Japanese: "鸓鼠 (むささひ もみ のふすま ももか)、ルイ チュイ".) As is often is the case, the Wakan Sansai Zue entry here is derivative of the corresponding entry for the leishu flying squirrel (Note: Obviously the mammal the Chinese book talks about is not the Japanese giant flying squirrel, but its cousin, the Complex-toothed flying squirrel.) in the Chinese compendium Bencao Gangmu (1596). Here Su Song is quoted as saying "When the people in the South see them, they consider them to be abnormal", though construed as "in the south many regard it as yōkai" in the Japanese translation. (Note: Japanese: "南方ではこれを多く妖怪視している", Chinese: "【頌曰】..南人見之, 多以為怪".) Also, Guo Pu's annotation to the Erya dictionary is quoted, which states that the "giant flying squirrels are shaped like small foxes,.. Their legs are short but their claws are long.. They consume smoke rising from fire", also paraphrased in Wakan Sansai Zue, and comparable to some of the descriptions and attributes of the yōkai given above.

== Relationship to mami ==
The Ehon Hyaku Monogatari also equates nobusuma to another yōkai named nodeppō, which is said to be a beast named mami (猯) turned old, and transmogrified into a yōkai. Yōkai researcher Katsumi Tada explains that this mami normally refers to a tanuki, but older sources including the Wakan Sansai Zue distinguish mami from tanuki, and mami could refer to other beasts including the musasabi flying squirrel. Thus perhaps it was this confusion that resulted in the legend as we know it. Hiroshi Aramata writes that mami referred to the momonga flying squirrel during the Heian Period, and legend has it that Taira no Kiyomori exterminated a yōkai named momi (毛朱) whose grave had stood until the modern age.

== See also ==
- List of legendary creatures from Japan
- momonjī
