= Asarone =

α-Asarone
β-Asarone

Names
- IUPAC names 1,2,4-Trimethoxy-5-[(E)-prop-1-enyl]benzene (α); 1,2,4-Trimethoxy-5-[(Z)-prop-1-enyl]benzene (β)
- Other names alpha-Azaron cis-Isoelemicin; 2,4,5-Trimethoxyphenyl-2-propene

Identifiers
CAS Number	2883-98-9 (α); 5273-86-9 (β)
3D model (JSmol)	(α): Interactive image; (β): Interactive image
ChEMBL	ChEMBL333306
ChemSpider	552532 (α); 4445072 (β)
ECHA InfoCard	100.018.858
PubChem CID	636822 (α); 5281758 (β)
UNII	DQY9PNE5FK (α); IGA3MH6IUW (β)
CompTox Dashboard (EPA)	DTXSID00871878 DTXSID20197784, DTXSID00871878
- InChI: InChI=1S/C12H16O3/c1-5-6-9-7-11(14-3)12(15-4)8-10(9)13-2/h5-8H,1-4H3/b6-5+ Key: RKFAZBXYICVSKP-AATRIKPKSA-N; InChI=1S/C12H16O3/c1-5-6-9-7-11(14-3)12(15-4)8-10(9)13-2/h5-8H,1-4H3/b6-5- Key: RKFAZBXYICVSKP-WAYWQWQTSA-N
- SMILES: (α): O(c1cc(c(OC)cc1OC)/C=C/C)C; (β): C/C=C\c1cc(c(cc1OC)OC)OC

Properties
Chemical formula	C_{12}H_{16}O_{3}
Molar mass	208.257 g·mol^{−1}
Appearance	Colorless solid
Density	α: 1.028 g/cm^{−3}
Melting point	62 to 63 °C (144 to 145 °F; 335 to 336 K) (α)
Boiling point	296 °C (565 °F; 569 K) (α)
Solubility in water	Insoluble
Magnetic susceptibility (χ)	−131.4·10^{−6} cm^{3}/mol
- Except where otherwise noted, data are given for materials in their standard state (at 25 °C [77 °F], 100 kPa). verify (what is ?) Infobox references

Asarone is chemical compound of the phenylpropanoid class found in certain plants such as Acorus and Asarum. There are two isomers, α (or trans) and β (or cis). Another related compound is γ-asarone. As a volatile fragrance oil, asarone is used in killing pests and bacteria.

== Pharmacology ==
The main clinical symptom of asarone is prolonged vomiting that sometimes lasted more than 15 hours. Asarone is not metabolized to trimethoxyamphetamine as has been claimed by online vendors.

The Council of Europe Committee of Experts on Flavouring Substances concluded that β-asarone is clearly carcinogenic and has proposed limits for its concentration in flavorings such as bitters made from Acorus calamus (sweet flag).

β-Asarone exhibits anti-fungal activity by inhibiting ergosterol biosynthesis in Aspergillus niger. However, the toxicity and carcinogenicity of asarone means that it may be difficult to develop any practical medication based on it.

== See also ==
- Elemicin
- 2,4,5-Trimethoxypropiophenone
- PiHKAL § Essential amphetamines
