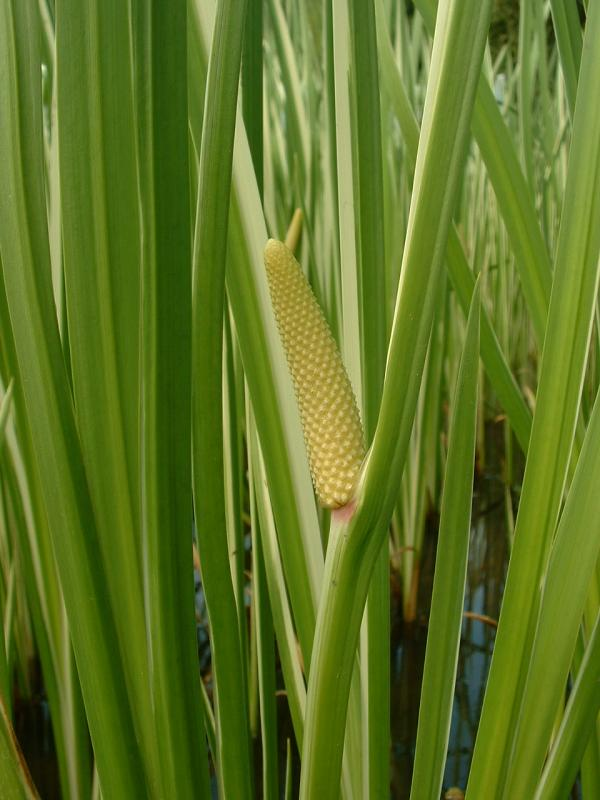
- Sweet flag

Conservation status
- Least Concern (IUCN 3.1)

- Apparently Secure (NatureServe)

Scientific classification
- Kingdom: Plantae
- Clade: Tracheophytes
- Clade: Angiosperms
- Clade: Monocots
- Order: Acorales
- Family: Acoraceae
- Genus: Acorus
- Species: A. calamus

Binomial name
- Acorus calamus L., 1753

Synonyms
- Calamus aromaticus Garsault

= Acorus calamus =

Sweet flag

Species of plant

Acorus calamus (also called sweet flag, sway or muskrat root, among many other common names) is a species of flowering plant. It is a tall wetland monocot of the family Acoraceae, in the genus Acorus. Although used in traditional medicine over centuries to treat digestive disorders and pain, it has no clinical evidence of safety or efficacy and may be toxic if ingested, and so has been commercially banned for use in food in the United States.

== Description ==
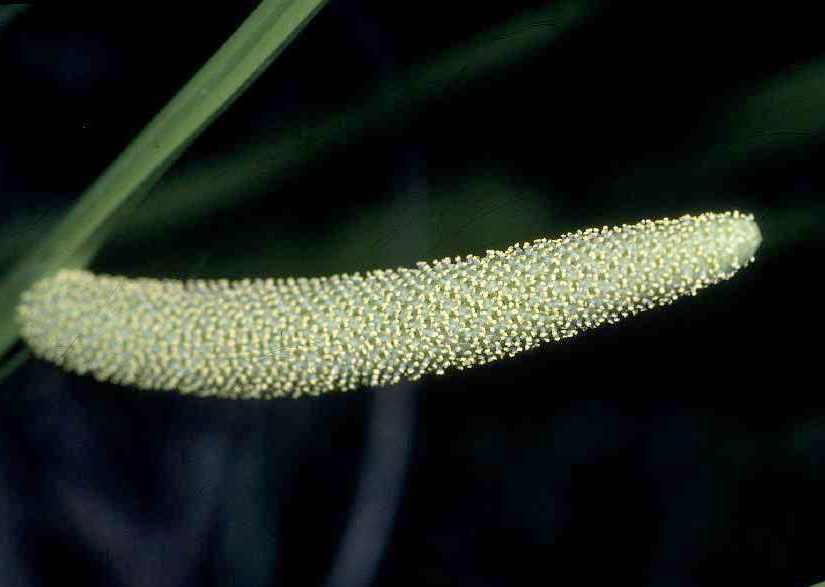
Inflorescence

Sweet flag is a herbaceous perennial, 2 m (79 in) tall. Its leaves resemble those of the iris family. Sweet flag consists of tufts of basal leaves that rise from a spreading rhizome. The leaves are erect yellowish-brown, radical, with pink sheathing at their bases, sword-shaped, flat and narrow, tapering into a long, acute point, and have parallel veins. The leaves have smooth edges, which can be wavy or crimped. The sweet flag can be distinguished from iris and other similar plants by the crimped edges of the leaves, the fragrant odor it emits when crushed, and the presence of a spadix.

Only plants that grow in water bear flowers. The fruit is a berry filled with mucus, which when ripe falls into the water and disperses by floating. The solid, triangular flower-stems rise from the axils of the outer leaves. A semi-erect spadix emerges from one side of the flower stem. The spadix is solid, cylindrical, tapers at each end, and is 5 to 10 cm in length. A covering spathe, as is usual with Araceae, is absent. The spadix is densely crowded with tiny greenish-yellow flowers. Each flower contains six petals and stamens enclosed in a perianth with six divisions, surrounding a three-celled, oblong ovary with a sessile stigma. The flowers are sweetly fragrant. In Europe, it flowers for about a month in late spring or early summer, but does not bear fruit. In Asia, it also fruits sparingly, and propagates itself mainly by growth of its rhizome, forming colonies.

The branched, cylindrical, knobby rhizome is the thickness of a human finger and has numerous coarse fibrous roots below it. The exterior is brown and the interior white.

== Range and habitat ==
Sweet flag is native to the Irtysh River valley in Kazakhstan, but has been widely introduced worldwide. Habitats include edges of small lakes, ponds and rivers, marshes, swamps, and other wetlands.

== Names and etymology ==
In addition to "sweet flag" and "calamus" other common names include beewort, bitter pepper root, calamus root, flag root, gladdon, myrtle flag, myrtle grass, myrtle root, myrtle sedge, pine root, sea sedge, sweet cane, sweet cinnamon, sweet grass, sweet myrtle, sweet root, sweet rush, sweet sedge and wada kaha.

The generic name is the Latin word acorus, which is derived from the Greek άχόρου (áchórou) of Dioscorides (note different versions of the text have different spellings). The word άχόρου itself is thought to have been derived from the word κόρη (kóri), which means pupil (of an eye), because of the juice from the root of the plant being used as a remedy in diseases of the eye ('darkening of the pupil').

The specific name calamus is derived from Greek κάλαμος (kálamos, meaning "reed"), cognate to Latin culmus ("stalk") and Old English healm ("straw"), Arabic قَلَم (qálam, "pen"), in turn from Proto-Indo European *kole-mo- (thought to mean "grass" or "reed"). The name "sweet flag" refers to its sweet scent and its similarity to Iris species, which have been commonly known as flags in English since at least the late fourteenth century.

== History ==
The plant was already mentioned in the Chester Beatty papyrus VI dating to approximately 1300 BC. The ancient Egyptians rarely mentioned the plant in medicinal contexts, but it was certainly used to make perfumes.

One of the ingredients in holy anointing oil, kaneh bosem meaning "spiced cane" or "sweet cane", is identified by Robert Sturtevant and Butler Stanton as Acorus calamus. However, botanists such as James A. Duke and Harold Norman Moldenke reject this as it did not grow in Ancient Israel.

Initially, Europeans confused the identity and medicinal uses of the Acorus calamus of the Romans and Greeks with their native Iris pseudacorus. Thus the Herbarius zu Teutsch, published at Mainz in 1485, describes and includes a woodcut of this iris under the name Acorus. This German book is one of three possible sources for the same error in the French Le Grant Herbier, written in 1486, 1488, 1498 or 1508, which was also published in an English translation as the Grete Herball by Peter Treveris in 1526; all of these contain the false identification printed in the Herbarius zu Teutsch. William Turner, writing in 1538, describes 'acorum' as "gladon or a flag, a yelowe floure delyce".

The plant was introduced to Britain in the late 16th century. By at least 1596, true Acorus calamus was grown in Britain, as it is listed in The Catalogue, a list of plants John Gerard grew in his garden at Holborn. Gerard notes, "It prospereth exceeding well in my garden, but as yet beareth neither flowers nor stalke". Gerard lists the Latin name as Acorus verus, but it is evident there was still doubt about its veracity: in his 1597 herbal he lists the English common name as 'bastard calamus'. Carl O. Sauer reported that the tuber was already being used by North American Indians at the time of European contact.

== Taxonomy ==
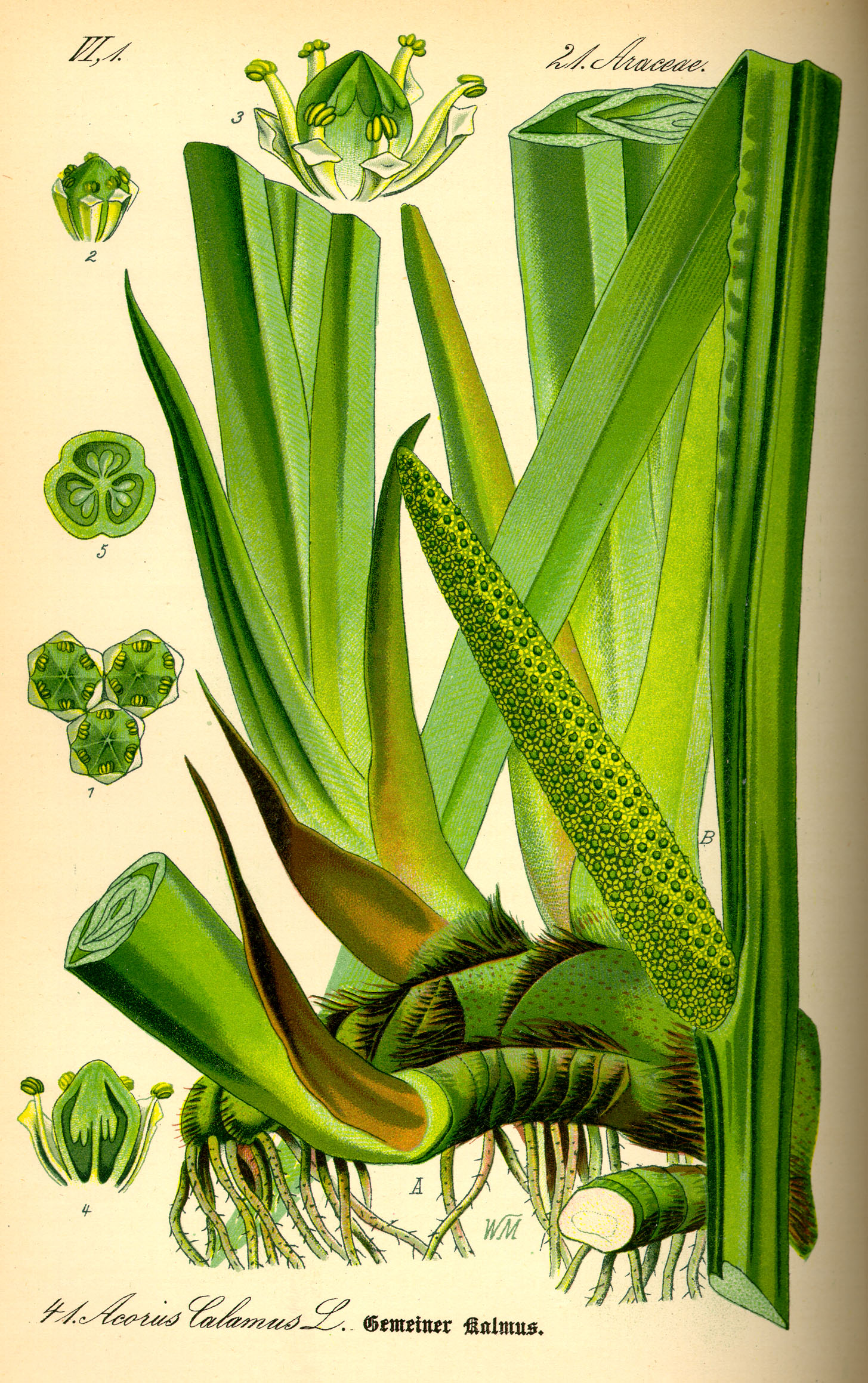
Illustration from an 1885 flora by Walther Otto Müller

There are three cytotypic forms distinguished by chromosome number: a diploid form (2n=24), an infertile triploid form (2n=36), and a tetraploid form (see below). The triploid form is the most common and is thought to have arisen relatively recently in the Himalayan region through hybridisation of the diploid with the tetraploid.

Probably indigenous to most of Asia, the triploid form Acorus calamus var. calamus (also known as var. vulgaris or var. verus) has now been introduced across Europe, Australia, New Guinea, South Africa, Réunion and North America. The tetraploid form Acorus calamus var. angustatus is native throughout Asia, from India to Japan and the Philippines and from Indonesia to Siberia. The diploid form Acorus americanus or Acorus calamus var. americanus is found in northern subarctic North America and scattered disjunct areas throughout the Mississippi Valley. It may not be native to some of these areas, Pre-Columbian populations are thought to have dispersed it across parts of the United States. Other diploids are found in Mongolia, central Siberia (Buryatia), Gilgit–Baltistan in Pakistan, and northern Himachal Pradesh in India.

Currently the taxonomic position of the different forms is contested. The comprehensive taxonomic analysis in Plants of the World Online from 2023 considers all three forms to be distinct varieties of a single species. The Flora of North America publication considers the diploid form to be a distinct species; its analysis differentiates North American diploid forms from triploid and tetraploid varieties, and does not take into account the morphology of Asian forms of the diploid variety. Also, in older literature, the name Acorus americanus may be used indiscriminately for all forms of Acorus calamus occurring in North America, irrespective of cytological diversity (i.e. both the diploid and triploid forms). The treatment in the Flora of China from 2010 considers all varieties to be synonyms of a single taxonomically undifferentiated species, since characteristics that are treated as distinctive in the Flora of North America are subject to morphological overlap in Asian specimens.

The primary morphological distinction between the triploid and the North American forms of the diploid is made by the number of prominent leaf veins, the diploid having a prominent midvein with equally raised secondary veins on both sides, the triploid having a single prominent midvein with the secondary veins barely distinct. According to the Flora of China, there is clear overlap in these characteristics and the different cytotypes are impossible to distinguish morphologically. Triploid plants are infertile and show an abortive ovary with a shrivelled appearance. This form will never form fruit (let alone seeds) and can only spread asexually.

The tetraploid variety is usually known as Acorus calamus var. angustatus Besser. A number of synonyms are known, but some of those are contested as to which variety they belong. It is morphologically diverse, with some forms having very broad and some narrow leaves. It is also cytotypically diverse, with an array of different karyotypes.

== Chemistry ==
Calamus leaves and rhizomes contain a volatile oil that gives a characteristic odor and flavor. Major components of the oil are beta-asarone (as much as 75%), methyl isoeugenol (as much as 40%) and alpha-asarone, saponins, lectins, sesquiterpenoids, lignans, and steroids. Phytochemicals in the plant vary according to geographic location, plant age, climate, species variety, and plant component extracted. Diploids do not contain beta-asarone.

== Safety and regulations ==
A. calamus and products derived from A. calamus (such as its oil) were banned from use as human food or as a food additive in 1968 by the United States Food and Drug Administration. Although limits on consumption in food or alcoholic beverages (115 micrograms per day) were recommended in a 2001 ruling by the European Commission, the degree of safe exposure remained undefined.

=== Toxicity ===
Although calamus has been used for its fragrance and ingested, it has not been studied by rigorous clinical research. Individual medical reports of toxicity mention severe nausea and prolonged vomiting over many hours following oral uses. Laboratory studies of its extracts indicate other forms of toxicity, due mainly to the emetic compound β-asarone. In Ayurveda, the rhizome is used only after a purification step (shodhana), in which it is boiled in media such as cow's milk. Analytical studies have reported that this processing significantly reduces the rhizome's β-asarone content, an effect attributed largely to volatilization of the heat-labile compound during prolonged boiling.

Allegedly, the plant is psychoactive (hallucinogenic), but for example all experiments with American calamus have been completely unsuccessful, even those involving very high dosages (up to 300 g of rhizomes).

== Uses ==
A. calamus has been an item of trade in many cultures for centuries. It has been used in traditional medicine for various ailments, and the aroma of its essential oil is used in the perfume industry. The essence from the rhizome is used as a flavor for foods, alcoholic beverages, and bitters in Europe. It was also once used to make candy.

=== Food ===
The young stalks can be pulled when under 30 cm (12 in); the inner stems can be eaten raw. The roots can be washed, peeled, cut into small pieces, boiled, and simmered in syrup to make candy.

=== In herbal medicine ===
Sweet flag has a long history of use in Chinese, Nepalese, and Indian herbal traditions. Sweet flag was and is used in herbalism by the Chipewyan people.

=== Horticulture ===
This plant is sometimes used as a pond plant in horticulture. There is at least one tetraploid ornamental cultivar known; it is usually called 'Variegatus', but the RHS recommends calling it 'Argenteostriatus'.

=== Insecticide and antifungal ===
The asarone from A. calamus, found most abundantly in the dried and pulverized roots, has been identified as having insecticidal properties. β-asarone also exhibits anti-fungal activity by inhibiting ergosterol biosynthesis in Aspergillus niger. However, asarone's toxicity and carcinogenicity in mammals (including humans) means that it may be difficult to develop any practical medications or insecticides based on it.

=== Symbolism ===
According to some interpretations, American poet Walt Whitman used the plant to represent homoerotic male love because of its phallic connotations.
