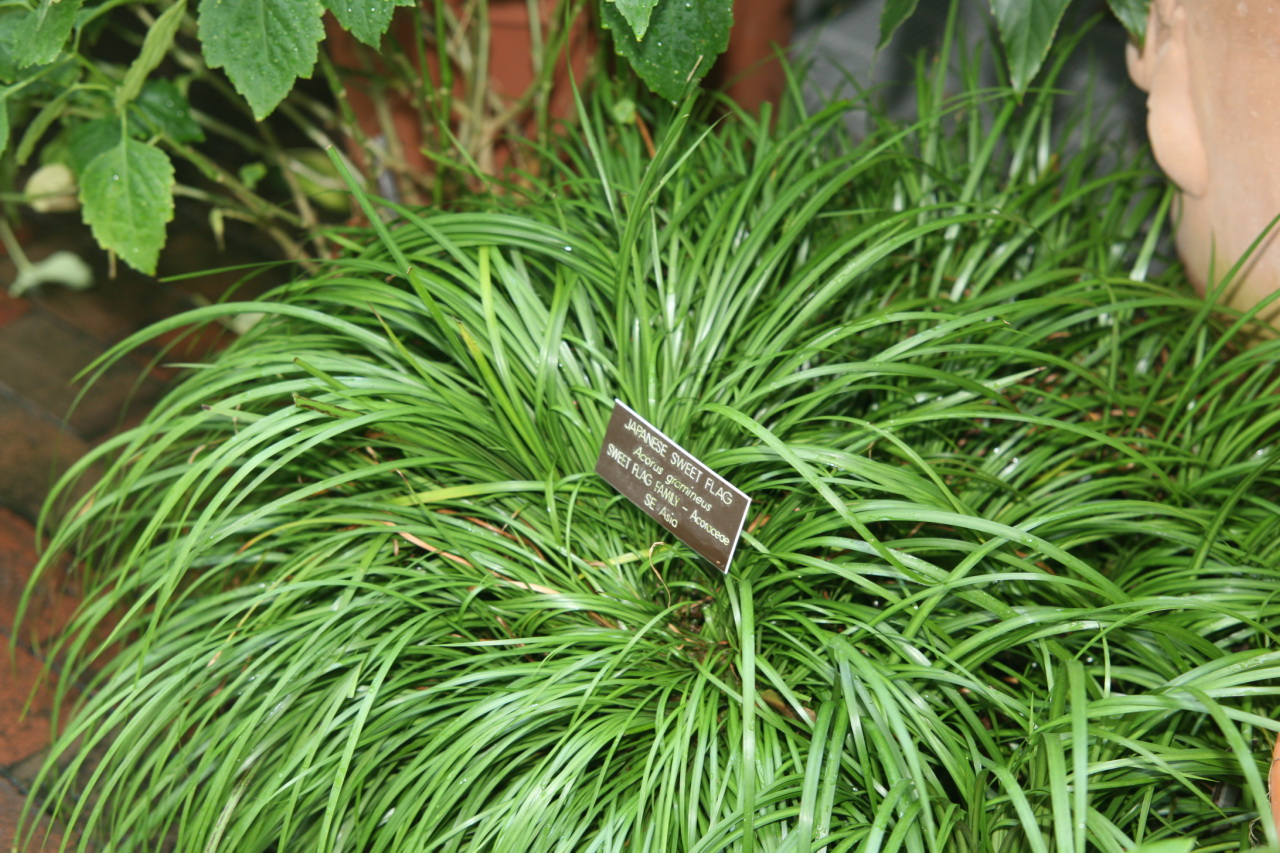

Scientific classification
- Kingdom: Plantae
- Clade: Embryophytes
- Clade: Tracheophytes
- Clade: Angiosperms
- Clade: Monocots
- Order: Acorales
- Family: Acoraceae
- Genus: Acorus
- Species: A. gramineus

Binomial name
- Acorus gramineus Sol. Aiton, 1789

= Acorus gramineus =

Species of aquatic plant

Acorus gramineus, commonly known as Japanese sweet flag, Japanese rush, grassy-leaved sweet flag, and grass-leaf sweet flag, is a botanical species belonging to the genus Acorus, native to Japan, Korea, and eastern Asia. The plant usually grows in wetlands and shallow water.

The genome of A. gramineus has been published by independent research groups in 2022 and 2023.

== Description ==
This shrubby plant's long, narrow, slightly curved leaves may grow to 30 cm (12 inches) in height. It can grow fully or partially submerged, or in very moist soil, but it will usually only flower when at least partially submerged.

Var. pusillus has slightly shorter, more rigid glossy green leaves, while var. variegatus has longer leaves streaked with yellow.

== Cultivation and uses ==
Acorus gramineus spreads aggressively by rhizome, creating a nearly-seamless groundcover where conditions are favorable, and it is frequently used around the edges of ponds and water gardens, as well as submerged in freshwater aquaria. It can be propagated by dividing the fleshy underwater rhizome and planting the base in shallow water.
