= Ichiu, Tokushima =

Dissolved municipality in Tokushima prefecture, Japan

Ichiu (一宇村, Ichiu-son) was a village located in Mima District, Tokushima Prefecture, Japan.

As of 2003, the village had an estimated population of 1,414 and a density of 14.45 persons per km^{2}. The total area was 97.88 km^{2}.

On March 1, 2005, Ichiu, along with the towns of Handa and Sadamitsu (all from Mima District), was merged to create the town of Tsurugi.

== Geography ==
Ichiu is dominated by steep and relatively tall mountains. The town is situated on the upper part of the Sadamitsu River.

== Education ==
Ichiu has one junior high school, and one elementary school, Komi Elementary. Due to lack of students, Ichiu Junior High School closed in spring 2010.

== Sightseeing ==
- Ichiu is known as "The Land of Giant Trees," and is home to a number of large, old trees. "Akabane Taishi no Enoki" is the oldest hackberry tree in Japan at an estimated 800 years old; it has a circumference of 8.7 meters. Ichiu is also home to Shikoku's oldest horse chestnut and Japanese red pine.
- Dogama is a series of pools, rapids and waterfalls formed as the Sadamitsu river flows through a slot canyon. It is notable for the deep blue-green color of its water.
- Mount Tsurugi and the Iya Valley may be accessed via Route 438 through Ichiu.

== Transportation ==
Japanese National Route 438 is the main road in Ichiu. Ichiu is served by local buses.
