= Tsurugi, Tokushima =

Tsurugi つるぎ町
- Town
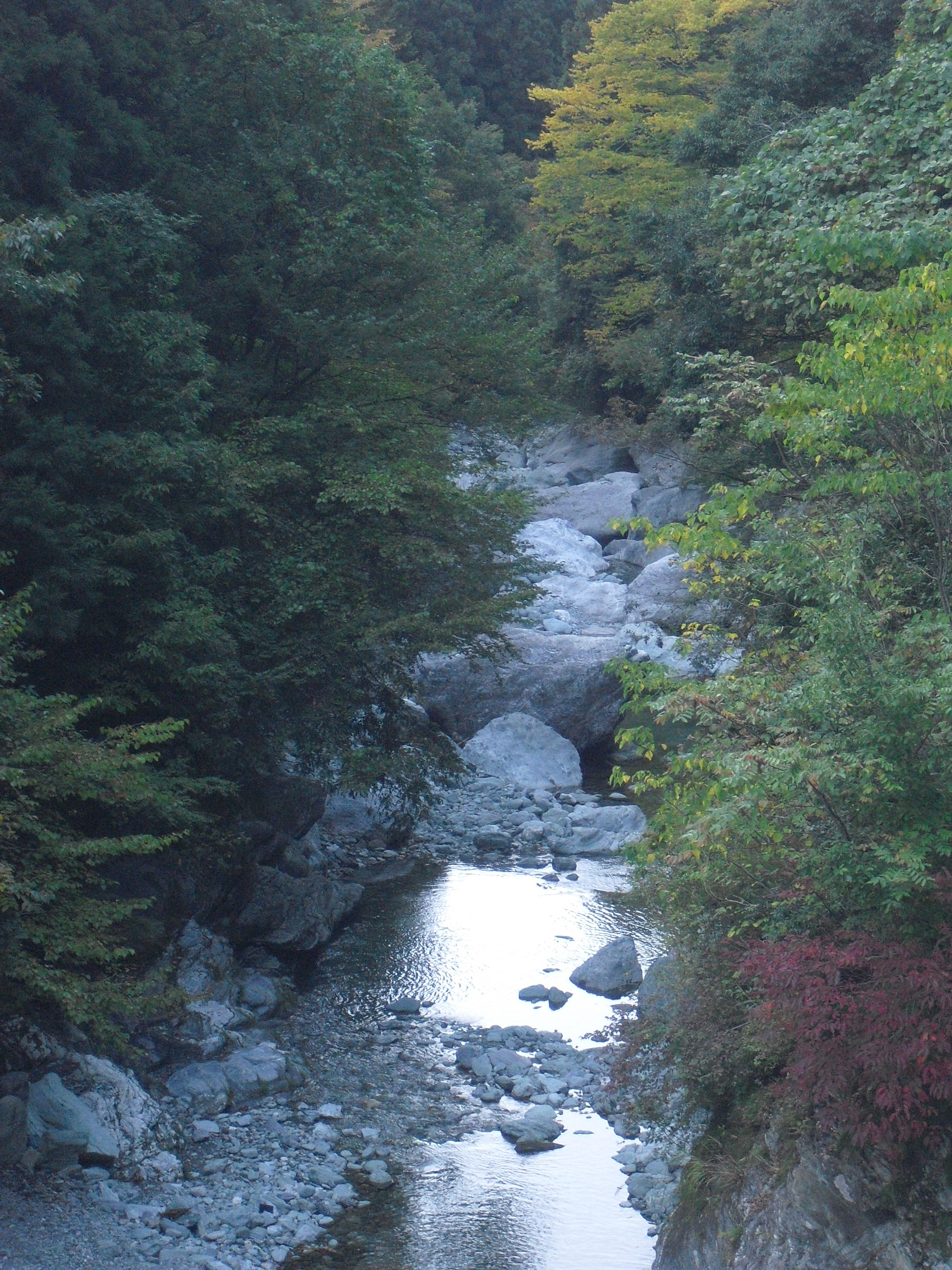

- Flag Seal

- Location of Tsurugi in Tokushima Prefecture

- Location in Japan
- Coordinates: 34°2′N 134°4′E
- Country: Japan
- Region: Shikoku
- Prefecture: Tokushima Prefecture
- District: Mima

Government
  - Mayor: Shigeru Kanenishi

Area
  - Total: 194.84 km^{2} (75.23 sq mi)

Population (June 1, 2019)
  - Total: 7,877
  - Density: 40.43/km^{2} (104.7/sq mi)
- Time zone: UTC+09:00 (JST)
- Website: www.town.tokushima-tsurugi.lg.jp
- Symbols
- Bird: Varied tit
- Flower: Daffodil
- Tree: Celtis sinensis

Tsurugi (つるぎ町, Tsurugi-chō) is a town in Mima District, Tokushima Prefecture, on the island of Shikoku in Japan.

The town was formed on March 1, 2005 as a result of the merger of the towns of Handa and Sadamitsu, and the village of Ichiu, all from Mima District.

The area is 194.84 km^{2} and the registered population, as of June 1, 2019, was 7,877 by a population density of 40.4 per km^{2}.

== Geography ==
Tsurugi is located in the northwestern part of Tokushima Prefecture. The Yoshino River, Shikoku's second-longest, forms the northern border of Tsurugi. Two tributaries, the Sadamitsu River and the Handa River, form the town's two main valleys. Sadamitsu and Handa are located at the mouths of these two rivers, while Ichiu is located further up the Sadamitsu river. Most of the town's area is covered by steep mountains. Tsurugi is bordered by Mima to the north and east, Higashimiyoshi to the west, and Miyoshi to the south.

== Education ==
- Handa Elementary
- Handa JHS
- Ichiu JHS (closed 2010)
- Komi Elementary (Ichiu)
- Ota Elementary (Sadamitsu)
- Sadamitsu Elementary
- Sadamitsu JHS
- Sadamitsu Technical High School
- Yachiyo Elementary (Handa)

== Transportation ==
The JR Shikoku Tokushima Line serves Tsurugi with two stations: Awa-Handa Station and Sadamitsu.

Two national highways of Japan pass through the town: Routes 192 and 438.

== Sightseeing ==
=== Sadamitsu ===
- Sadamitsu's main street is lined with Edo-era merchants' houses featuring udatsu, an architectural feature that both prevented the spread of fires between buildings and served as a decorative symbol of the merchant's wealth and status.
- Narutaki is a waterfall at the southern edge of Sadamitsu. Its upper falls is approximately 40 meters tall, and is followed by two smaller cascades of 25 and 20 meters.

=== Handa ===
- Handa is famous for its sōmen noodles. "Handa Sōmen" has been a special product of the area for over 250 years, and several sōmen makers still operate today.
- Ishido-yama (1636 m) and Yahazu-yama (1848 m), although located in Ichiu, are easily accessed via a trailhead at Oso Ishido Jinja, in Handa. Yahazu-yama provides panoramic views of the Iya Valley and prominent mountains such as Mount Tsurugi, Jirogyu, and Miune.

=== Ichiu ===
- Ichiu is known as "The Land of Giant Trees," and is home to a number of large, old trees. "Akabane Taishi no Enoki" is the oldest hackberry tree in Japan at an estimated 800 years old; it has a circumference of 8.7 meters. Ichiu is also home to Shikoku's oldest horse chestnut and Japanese red pine.
- Dogama is a series of pools, rapids and waterfalls formed as the Sadamitsu river flows through a slot canyon. It is notable for the deep blue-green color of its water.

=== Other areas ===
- Iya Valley
- Mount Tsurugi
- Oku-Iya double vine bridges (kazura-bashi)
