= Mima, Tokushima =

Mima 美馬市
- City
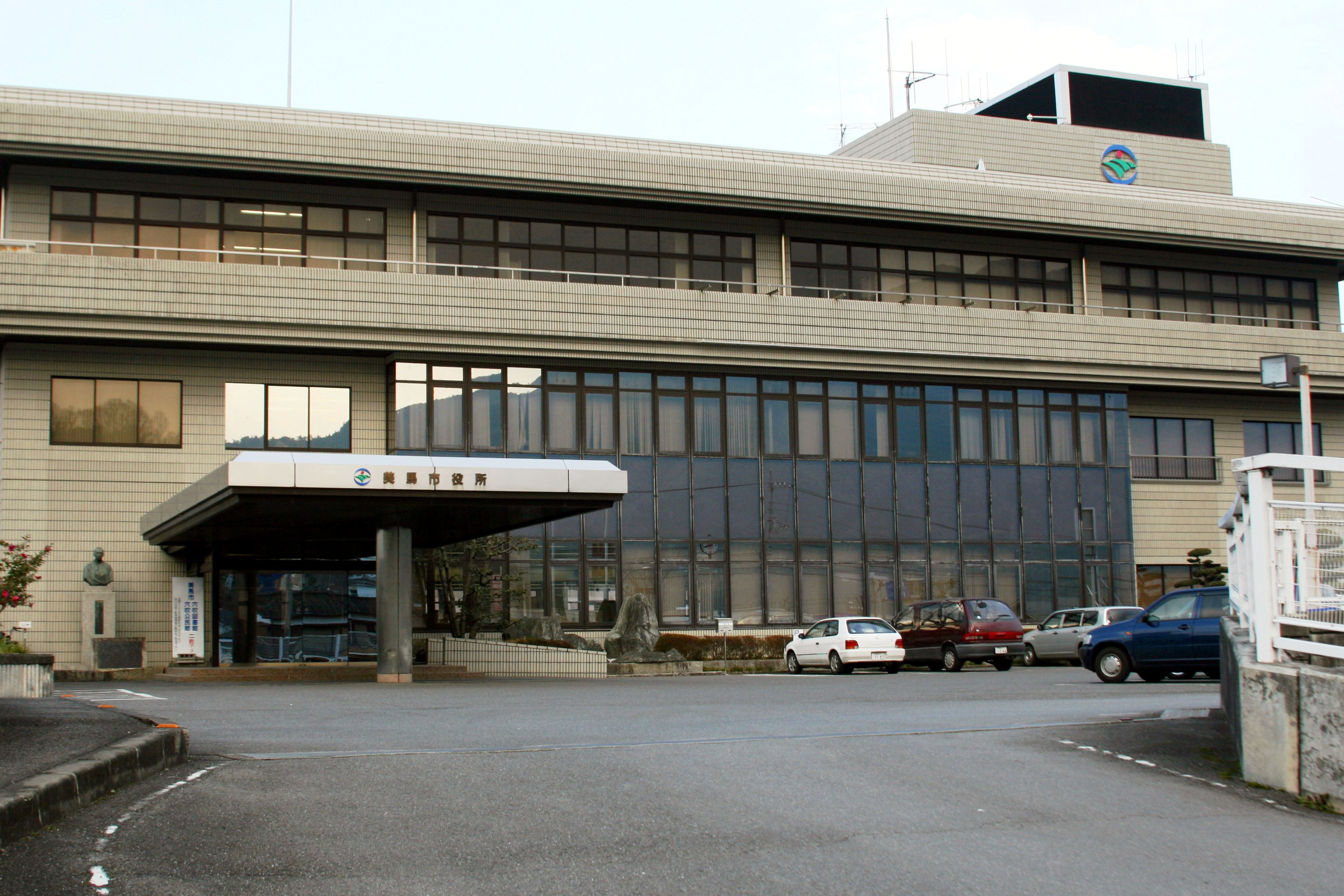
- Mima City Hall

- Flag Emblem
- Interactive map of Mima
- Location in Japan
- Coordinates: 34°3′N 134°10′E
- Country: Japan
- Region: Shikoku
- Prefecture: Tokushima

Government
  - Mayor: Fujita Motoharu

Area
  - Total: 367.14 km^{2} (141.75 sq mi)

Population (February 1, 2022)
  - Total: 27,713
  - Density: 75.483/km^{2} (195.50/sq mi)
- Time zone: UTC+09:00 (JST)
- City hall address: 5 Anabuki-cho, Anabuki-ji-kutanchi, Mima-shi, Tokushima-ken 777-8577
- Climate: Cfa
- Website: Official website
- Symbols
- Bird: Pendrocopos major
- Flower: Crape-myrtle
- Tree: Salix babylonica

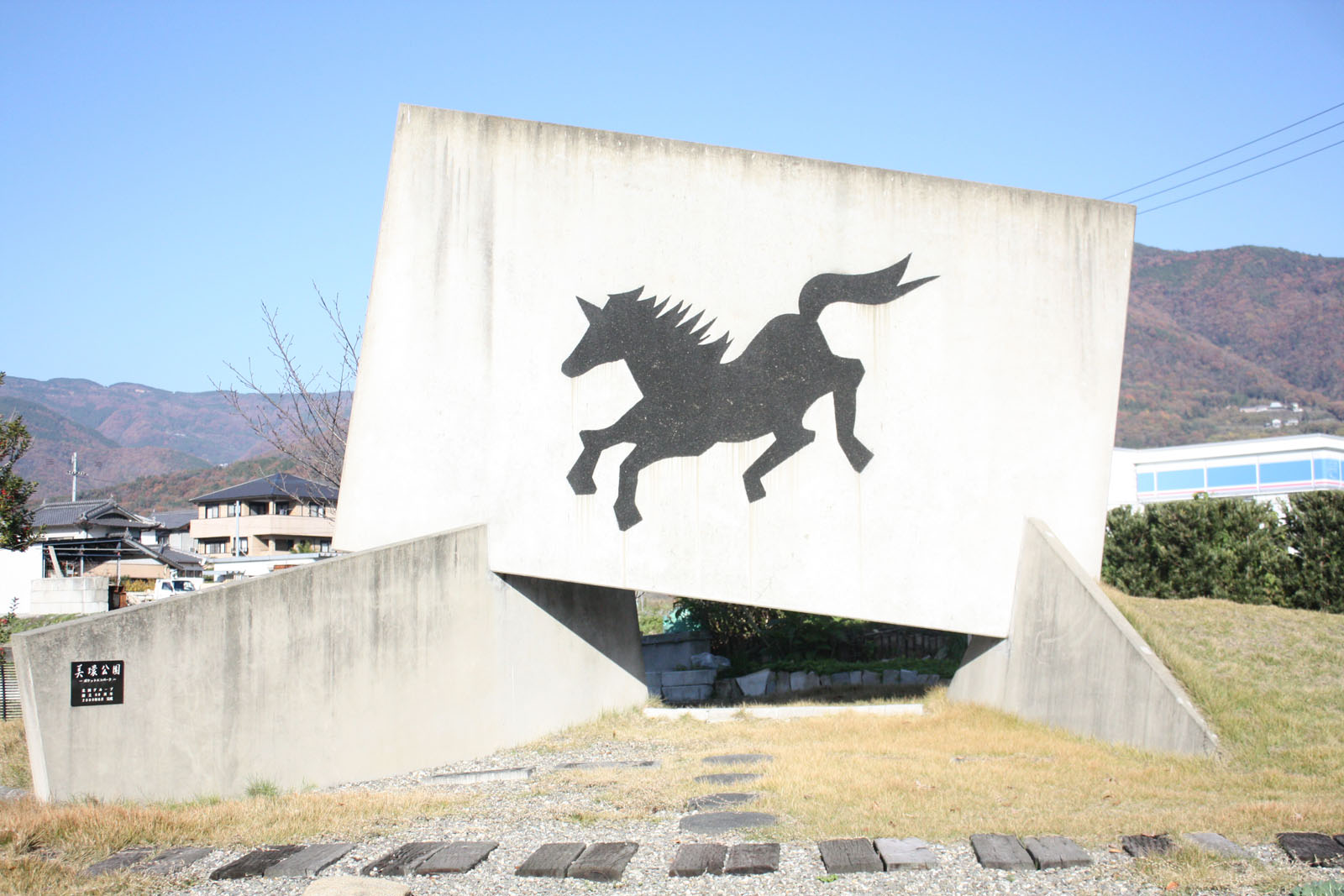
"Beautiful horse" depicted in park south of Mima I.C.

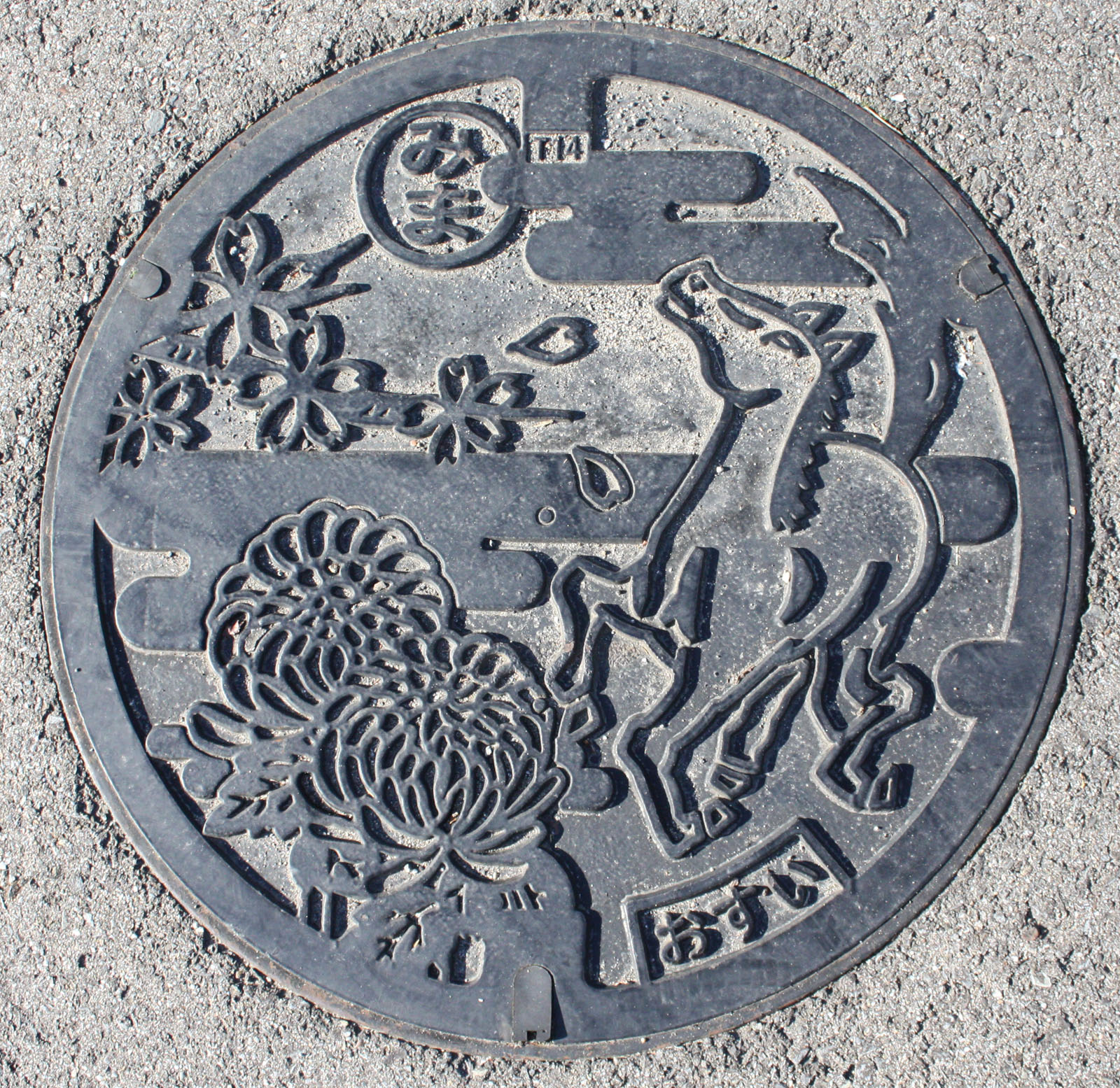
Horse depicted in manhole of Kozato and Kirai area in Old Mima.

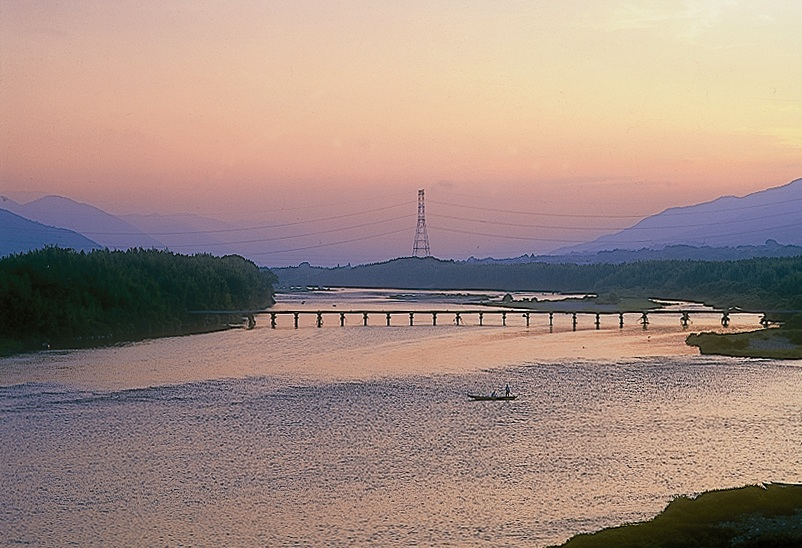
Yoshino River in Mima

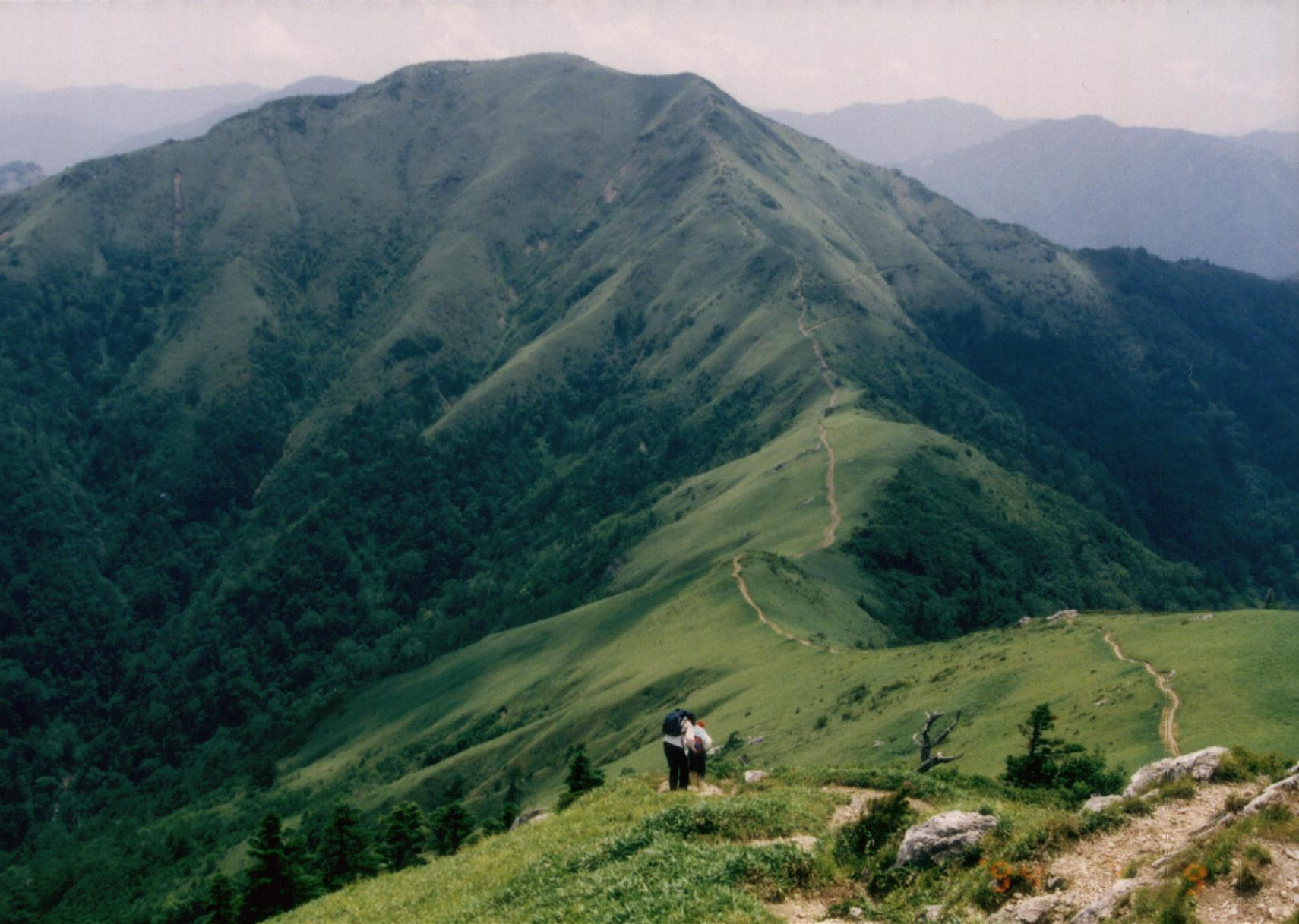
View of Mt. Tsurugi

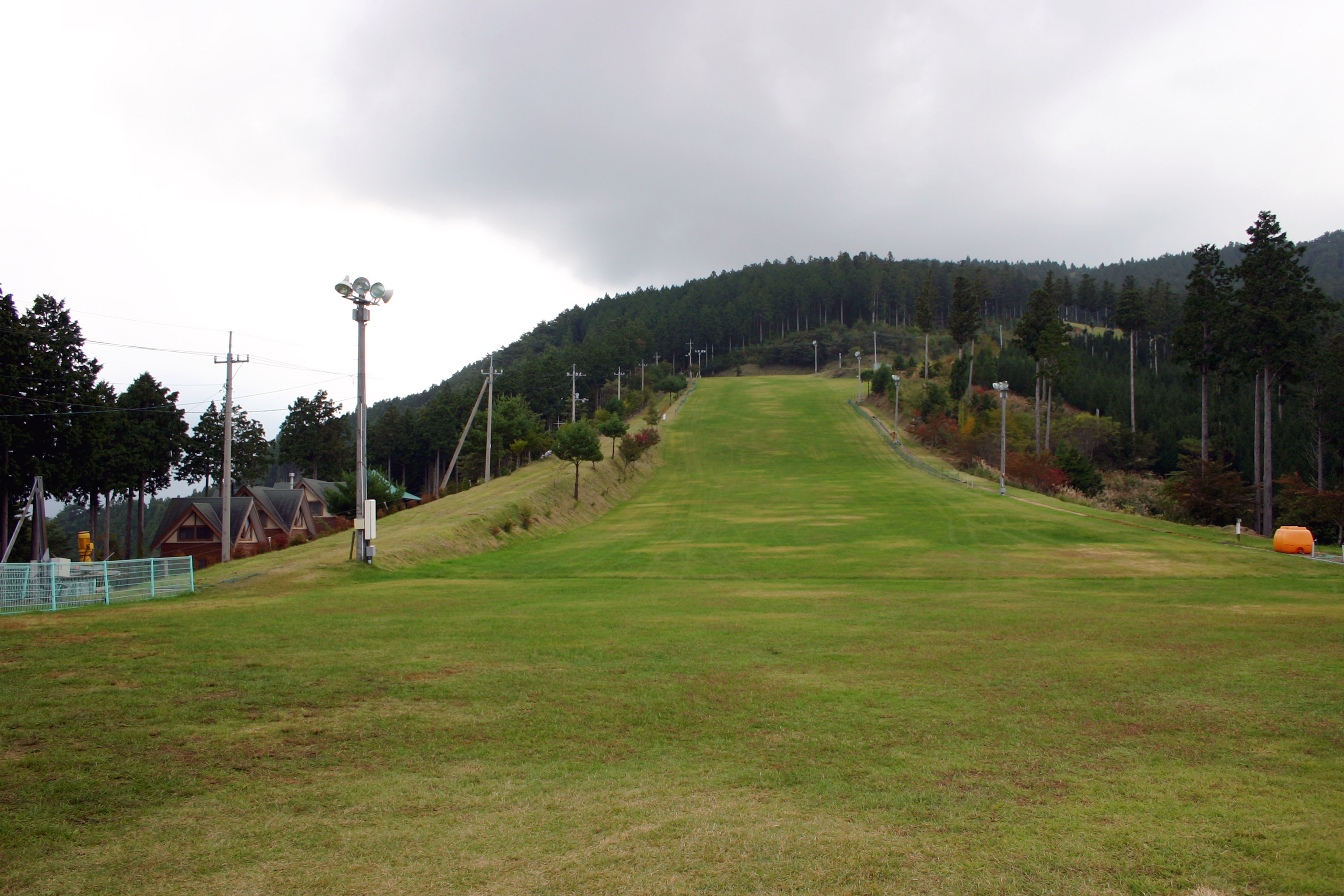
Grass ski slope in Koyadaira

Mima (美馬市, Mima-shi) is a city located in Tokushima Prefecture, Japan. As of 1 February 2022, the city had an estimated population of 27,713 in 12,547 households and a population density of 75 persons per km^{2}. The total area of the city is 367.14 square kilometres (141.75 sq mi).

== Name ==
The name Mima (美馬) is derived from two characters meaning "Beautiful Horse". Mima was once home to many horse breeders. Although breeders and keepers are not so common in present-day Mima, the history lives on today in art, local products, and such.

== Ikezuki ==
There is also the story of a famous horse named Ikezuki. He is a famous horse born from a captive Mima Town mother and a wild father from Mount Tsurugi. He later belonged to Shōgun Minamoto no Yoritomo and often makes appearances throughout history, such as in Tale of Heike, Genpei War, and The Battle of Uji (1184) (crossing the Uji River). Ikezuki's mother was buried at what is now Ikezuki Park. It is unsure whether Ikezuki is a factual or fictional character.

== Geography ==
Mima is located in north-central Tokushima Prefecture on the island of Shikoku. Almost the entire area of Tokushima Prefecture and the mainland of Kagawa Prefecture is within a 50 kilometer radius of the city. The city is located in the lower reaches of the Yoshino River. The plains (northern part) have a Seto Inland Sea climate with less rain, and the mountainous areas (southern part) have a more rainy Pacific Ocean climate. Especially in mountainous areas, it is not uncommon in winter for roads to experience ice and snow. There are many steep slopes in the mountainous areas, and traditional steep slope farming to prevent soil erosion is used. The Yoshino River flows west–east through Mima. It is the second longest river in Shikoku, boasting a length of 194 km. It is a popular spot for fishing, kayaking, and rafting. Mount Tsurugi, the second highest mountain in Shikoku, is on the border of Mima, Naka District and Miyoshi District. The Nakoyama Highlands just east of Mt. Tsurugi, had wide slopes with many bungalows, cottages, and RV parks open from April through the end of November. One face of the mountain has a famous grass ski area, hosting the Annual World Championships with the longest run stretching 500 meters and descending 62 meters. Flowing from south to north through the town of Anabuki and the village of Koyadaira is the Anabuki River. Its sources are a collection of many streams from around the Mt. Tsurugi area, and is popular for its cleanliness. As of 2005, the Anabuki River has held its position as the cleanest river in Shikoku for 11 years. There is a thriving population of the Japanese fishes ayu, amego, and iwana. The upstream town of Koyadaira hosts the Amego Fishing Competition every year in April.

- Rivers: Yoshino River, Anabuki River, Sadamitsu River
- Mountains: Mount Tsurugi, Mount Nako

=== Neighbouring municipalities ===
Kagawa Prefecture

- Higashikagawa
- Sanuki

Tokushima Prefecture

- Kamiita
- Mima
- Yoshinogawa

=== Climate ===
Mima has a humid subtropical climate (Köppen climate classification Cfa) with hot summers and cool winters. Precipitation is high, but there is a pronounced difference between the wetter summers and drier winters. The average annual temperature in Mima is 15.2 °C (59.4 °F). The average annual rainfall is 1,539.0 mm (60.59 in) with September as the wettest month. The temperatures are highest on average in August, at around 26.5 °C (79.7 °F), and lowest in January, at around 4.3 °C (39.7 °F). The highest temperature ever recorded in Mima was 39.4 °C (102.9 °F) on 30 July 2026; the coldest temperature ever recorded was −6.3 °C (20.7 °F) on 9 January 2021.

Climate data for Anabuki, Mima (2001−2020 normals, extremes 2001−present)
Month	Jan	Feb	Mar	Apr	May	Jun	Jul	Aug	Sep	Oct	Nov	Dec	Year
Record high °C (°F)	19.0 (66.2)	23.5 (74.3)	27.7 (81.9)	30.5 (86.9)	33.2 (91.8)	36.1 (97.0)	39.4 (102.9)	38.4 (101.1)	36.4 (97.5)	32.1 (89.8)	27.6 (81.7)	22.4 (72.3)	39.4 (102.9)
Mean daily maximum °C (°F)	8.8 (47.8)	10.3 (50.5)	14.3 (57.7)	19.9 (67.8)	24.5 (76.1)	27.1 (80.8)	30.9 (87.6)	32.2 (90.0)	27.8 (82.0)	22.2 (72.0)	16.5 (61.7)	11.0 (51.8)	20.5 (68.8)
Daily mean °C (°F)	4.3 (39.7)	5.2 (41.4)	8.5 (47.3)	13.8 (56.8)	18.5 (65.3)	21.9 (71.4)	25.7 (78.3)	26.5 (79.7)	22.6 (72.7)	17.1 (62.8)	11.5 (52.7)	6.4 (43.5)	15.2 (59.3)
Mean daily minimum °C (°F)	0.6 (33.1)	1.0 (33.8)	3.5 (38.3)	8.3 (46.9)	13.3 (55.9)	17.8 (64.0)	22.0 (71.6)	22.5 (72.5)	19.0 (66.2)	13.2 (55.8)	7.4 (45.3)	2.7 (36.9)	10.9 (51.7)
Record low °C (°F)	−6.3 (20.7)	−4.7 (23.5)	−3.3 (26.1)	0.0 (32.0)	4.6 (40.3)	10.6 (51.1)	16.1 (61.0)	16.3 (61.3)	11.5 (52.7)	5.1 (41.2)	−0.5 (31.1)	−3.0 (26.6)	−6.3 (20.7)
Average precipitation mm (inches)	47.3 (1.86)	54.2 (2.13)	79.4 (3.13)	67.5 (2.66)	105.9 (4.17)	167.8 (6.61)	216.0 (8.50)	222.6 (8.76)	269.2 (10.60)	163.5 (6.44)	59.9 (2.36)	68.9 (2.71)	1,539 (60.59)
Average precipitation days (≥ 1.0 mm)	8.5	9.0	10.4	9.1	8.8	11.7	12.0	9.3	11.0	8.9	7.5	9.9	116.1
Mean monthly sunshine hours	117.7	122.9	163.0	189.1	193.8	132.8	167.6	202.2	137.6	143.3	124.3	110.3	1,814.3
Source: Japan Meteorological Agency

== Demographics ==
Per Japanese census data, the population of Mima in 2020 is 28,055 people. Mima has been conducting censuses since 1950.

Historical population
Year	Pop.	±%
1950	63,898	—
1955	60,959	−4.6%
1960	55,930	−8.2%
1965	49,688	−11.2%
1970	44,798	−9.8%
1975	42,590	−4.9%
1980	41,642	−2.2%
1985	40,689	−2.3%
1990	39,159	−3.8%
1995	38,202	−2.4%
2000	36,632	−4.1%
2005	34,565	−5.6%
2010	32,502	−6.0%
2015	30,501	−6.2%
2020	28,055	−8.0%
Mima population statistics

About 20.1% is inhabitable land.

== History ==
As with all of Tokushima Prefecture, the area of Mima was part of ancient Awa Province. During the Edo period, the area was part of the holdings of Tokushima Domain ruled by the Hachisuka clan from their seat at Tokushima Castle. Following the Meiji restoration, it was organized into villages within Mima District with the creation of the modern municipalities system on October 1, 1889, including the town of Waki and the villages of Anabuki, Kozato and Shigekiyo. The city of Anabuki was raised to town status on January 26, 1924, and Kozato on December 10, 1940. Kozato and Shgekiyo merged to form the town of Mima on March 31, 1957. The city of Mima was established on March 1, 2005, from the merger of the former towns of Mima, Anabuki and Waki (all from Mima District) and the village of Koyadaira from Oe District.

== Government ==
Mima has a mayor-council form of government with a directly elected mayor and a unicameral city council of 18 members. Mima contributes two members to the Tokushima Prefectural Assembly. In terms of national politics, the city is part of Tokushima 2nd district of the lower house of the Diet of Japan.

== Economy ==
The economy of Mima is primarily agricultural.

== Education ==
Mima has nine public elementary schools and seven public middle schools operated by the city government and three public high schools operated by the Tokushima Prefectural Department of Education.

=== High schools ===
- Anabuki High School
- Mima Commercial High School
- Wakimachi High School

=== Junior high schools ===
- Anabuki Junior High School
- Ehara Junior High School
- Iwakura Junior High School
- Koyadaira Junior High School
- Mima Junior High School
- Mishima Junior High School
- Wakimachi Junior High School

=== Elementary schools ===
- Anabuki Elementary School
- East Ehara Elementary School (Closed from April 2011)
- East Shigekiyo Elementary School
- Hatsukusa Elementary School (Closed from April 2011)
- Iwakura Elementary School
- Kirai Elementary School
- Koyadaira Elementary School
- Kozato Elementary School
- Mishima Elementary School
- Miyauchi Elementary School
- North Ehara Elementary School
- North Shigekiyo Elementary School
- South Ehara Elementary School
- Shibasaka Elementary School
- Shimizu Elementary School
- Wakimachi Elementary School
- West Shigekiyo Elementary School

== Transportation ==
=== Airports ===
Mima is serviced by Takamatsu Airport and Tokushima Airport. There are no airports in Mima.

- Takamatsu Airport is located 35–40 km north of Mima, in Takamatsu, Kagawa Prefecture. It can be accessed by Route 193. From the City Hall, it takes approximately 40 minutes by car.
- Tokushima Airport is located 52 km east of Mima, in Tokushima. By highway, it takes approximately 50 minutes by car.

=== Railways ===
Three train stations serve Mima (in east–west order): Shikoku Railway Company – Tokushima Line

- Anabuki - Oshima - Sadamitsu

=== Highways ===
- Tokushima Expressway. Two interchanges allow access, Wakimachi I.C. and Mima I.C.
- National Route 192, running east–west from Tokushima to Saijō, Ehime.
- National Route 193, running north–south from Takamatsu, Kagawa through Mima, eventually making its way to Tokushima.
- National Route 377
- National Route 438
- National Route 439
- National Route 492

== Local attractions ==
- Kōzato temple ruins, National Historic Site

=== Udatsu Townscape ===
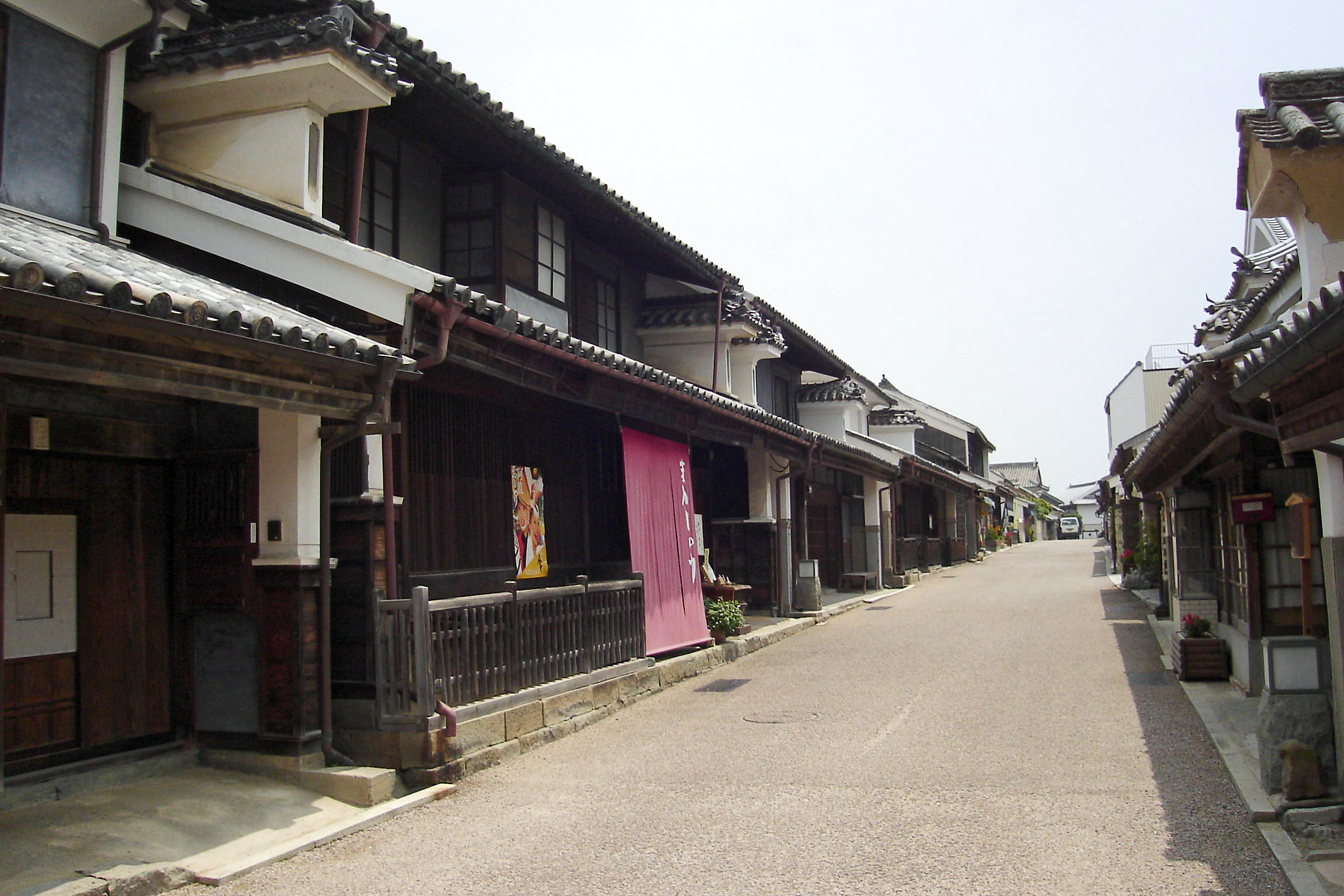
Udatsu townscape

Straight from the Edo and Meiji eras, Udatsu Townscape is a symbol of Wakimachi's old days. Characteristic of the buildings are the presence of “Udatsu,” extensions of the roof that served as protection from the spread of fires. Udatsu were also symbols of fortune, and continue to proclaim the prosperity of the merchants even today. The charm of the old town continues to excite nostalgia, as the broadcast industry often features it in television dramas and commercials. The national government recognized Udatsu Street as an “Important Preservation District for Groups of Historic Buildings” in December 1988.

=== Wakimachi and Odeon theaters ===
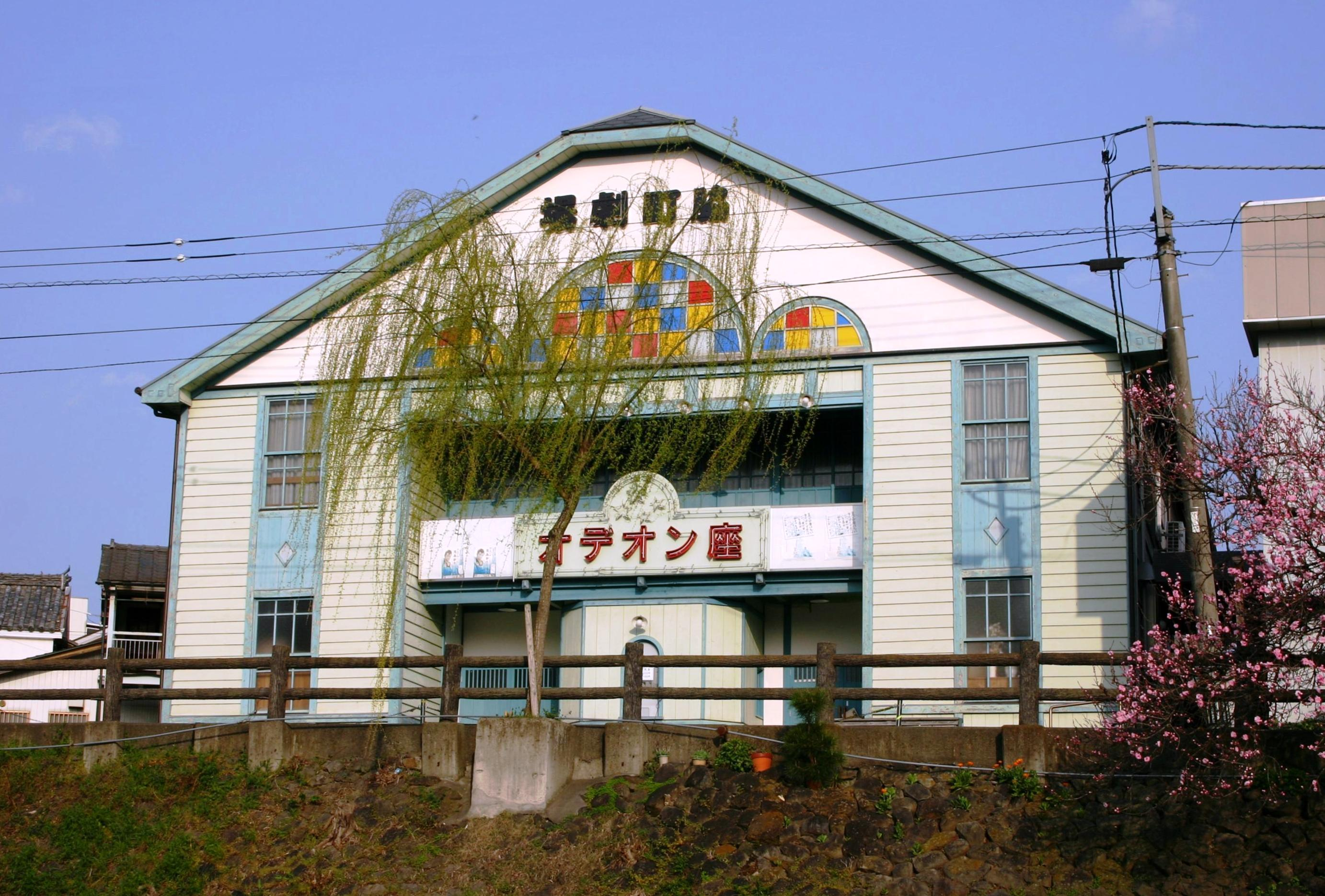
Odeonza in Wakimachi

Originally constructed in 1934, Wakimachi Theater was a playhouse for kabuki, rōkyoku (storytelling accompanied with shamisen music), and other such entertainment. In the post-WWII era, it became a movie theater, and was then closed in 1995. It was scheduled for demolition, but after Shōchiku Films decided to use it as a location in their famous film, “The Man Who Catches Rainbows,” it was brought back into the limelight. The theater underwent restoration in 1999.

=== Teramachi ===
Teramachi, which means "Temple Town," has many Buddhist temples in a small area, including Ganshō-ji (願勝寺), which was probably built during the Nara period, featuring a traditional landscaped garden complete with a pond and stream. Anraku-ji (安楽寺) which is the oldest Jōdo Shinshū temple in Shikoku. Anraku-ji features a Noh stage, hosting Noh and other such plays from the local Noh Appreciation Group. There is also Saikyō-ji (西教寺) of the same movement, and Rinshō-ji.

=== Dannozukaana Kofun Cluster ===
Built approximately 1400 years ago, these tombs are large dome-shaped rooms at the end of a short tunnel. Having been designated as a National Historical Site in 1942, its unique structure continues to be studied today. Relics from the tombs are kept in nearby Tera-machi. The large tomb, to the east, is called the “Drum Tomb”. The mound itself measures 13 meters while the height and width inside measures 4.3 m and 3.4 m, respectively. Including the tunnel, the length of the mound is measured at 37 m. The second tomb, to the west, is called the “Shelf Tomb”. Length is 20 m, height is 8.7 m, while height and width inside is 2.8 m and 2.0 m, respectively.

=== Aoki Residence ===
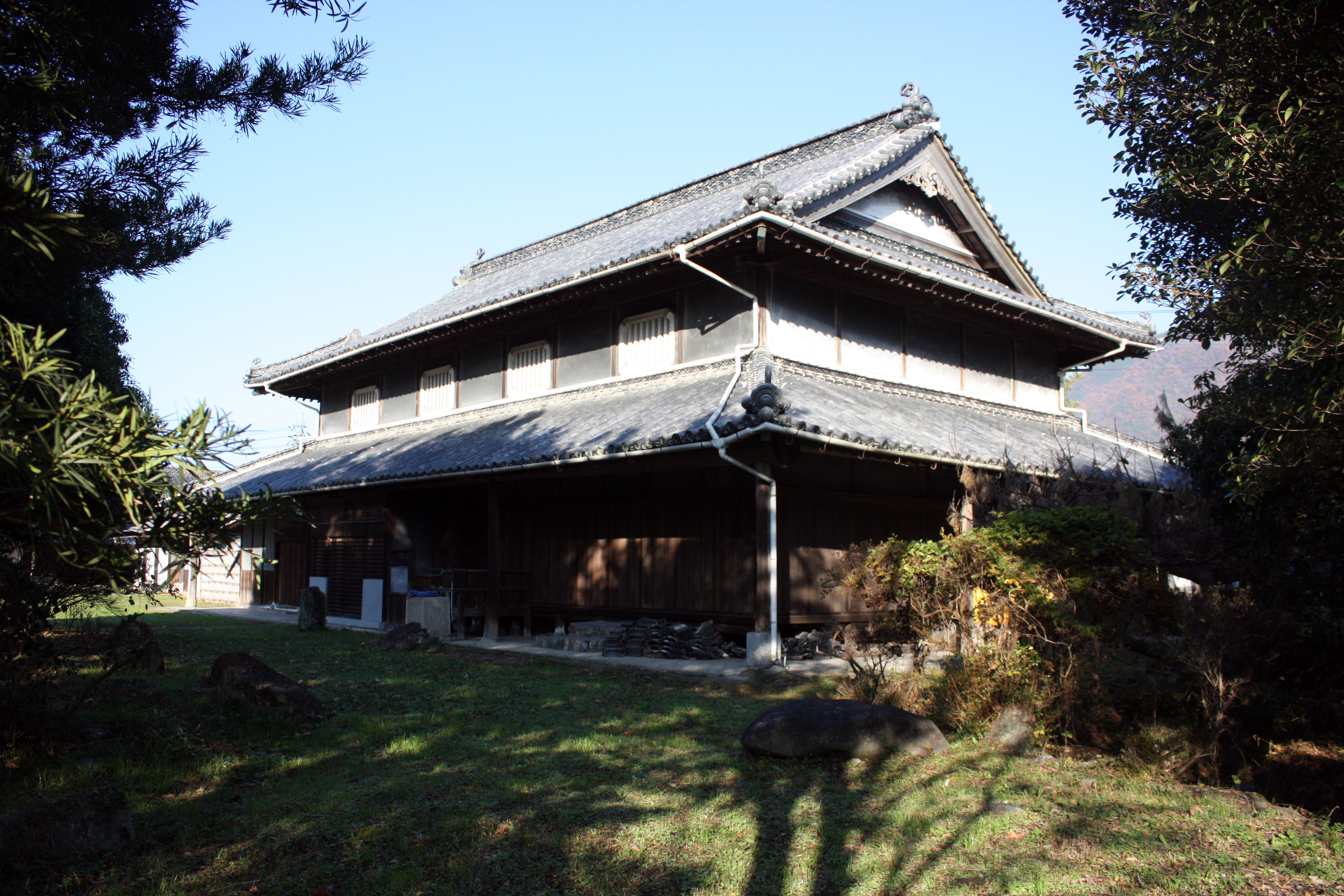
Aoki Residence, main building, in Old Mima.

The late Mr. Aoki returned from Nagasaki to his hometown, Mima. He built a large Taisho-era mansion as a retirement home for himself and his wife. His wife worked in the large herb garden and made bamboo spatulas from morning to evening. The house stood vacant for 30 years, before the Aokis, now living in Osaka, donated the house to its hometown, Mima. The Aoki Residence is located on 3,590 m^{2} of land, with a 2 meter high wall surrounding it. The main building includes several old fashioned rooms, featuring both tatami and clay floors. There is also a two-story warehouse and other small buildings. Today, the Aoki Residence holds many events, including but not limited to gatherings of local residents and enthusiasts interested in pottery, indigo dye, flower arranging, dancing, shamisen, etc. It may also be used for wedding receptions.

=== Miki Residence ===
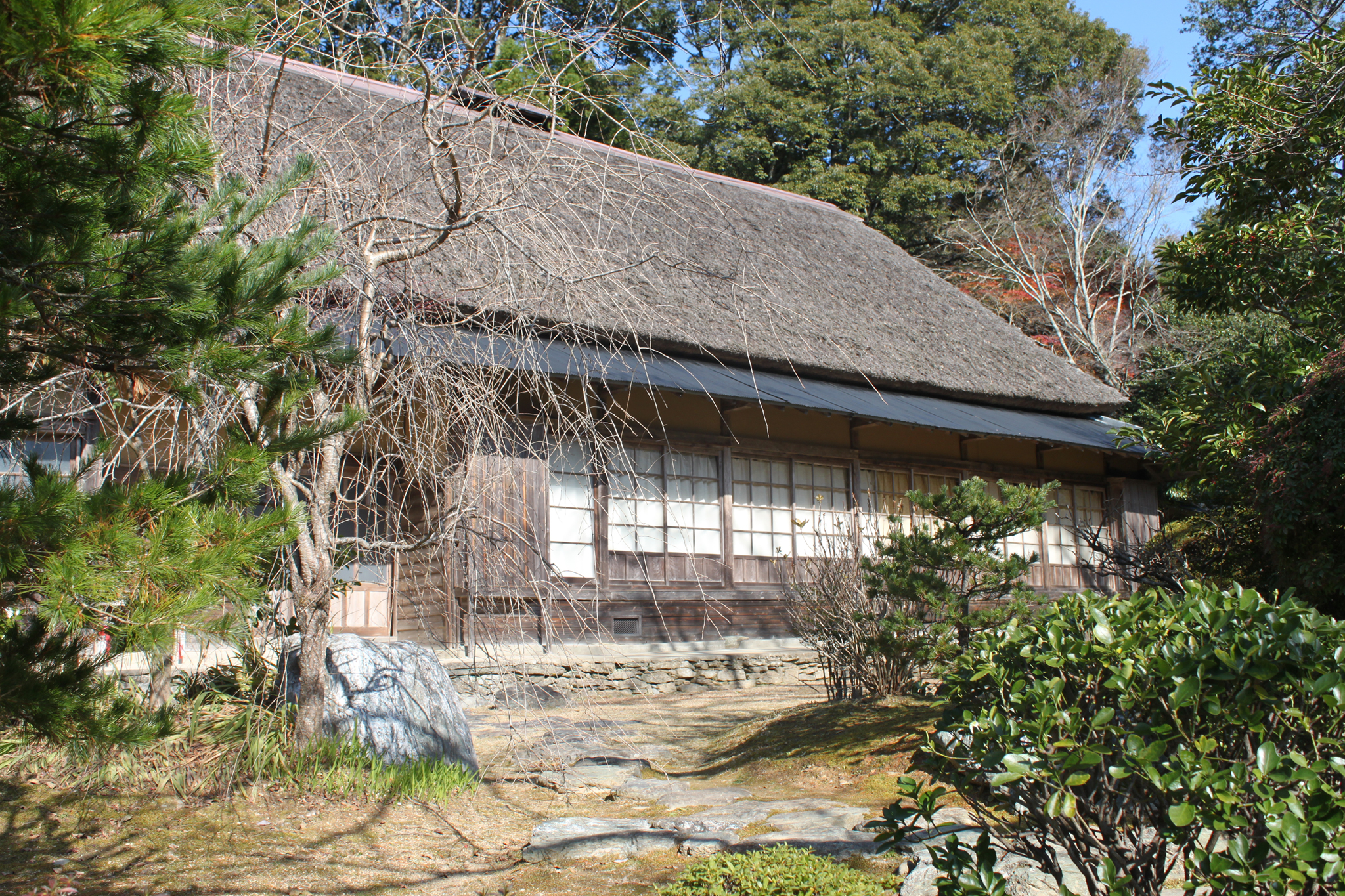
Miki Residence in Koyadaira

The Miki Family Residence was built during the Edo Period. The Miki family was famous for preserving many historic Kamakura period¥Kamakura and Muromachi period documents from the surrounding Koyadaira and Yamakawa area. The house was recognized as an important cultural heritage site and remains today as one of the oldest houses in Tokushima. The grounds feature the main house, as well as several small buildings, mostly for storage. There is also a museum and garden, featuring many cherry blossom trees. The museum and residence is closed from December to March. The garden is best seen in April, when the cherry blossoms are blooming.

=== Former Nagaoka residence ===
The former Nagaoka residence (旧長岡家住宅 Kyū Nagaoka-ke Jūtaku) was originally located at the foot of the southern slopes of the Sanuki Mountains. In 1976 the residence was designated a National Important Cultural Property. In 1979 it was disassembled and reassabled in the Wakimachi area. The house is 12 meters long and 6,6 meters wide. It has a Yosemune-tsukuri (寄棟造り) thatched roof. The outside walls are made from mud and earth. This is characteristic for houses on the foot of the southern slopes of the Sanuki mountains (due to the lack of rainfall).

=== Ikezuki Park ===
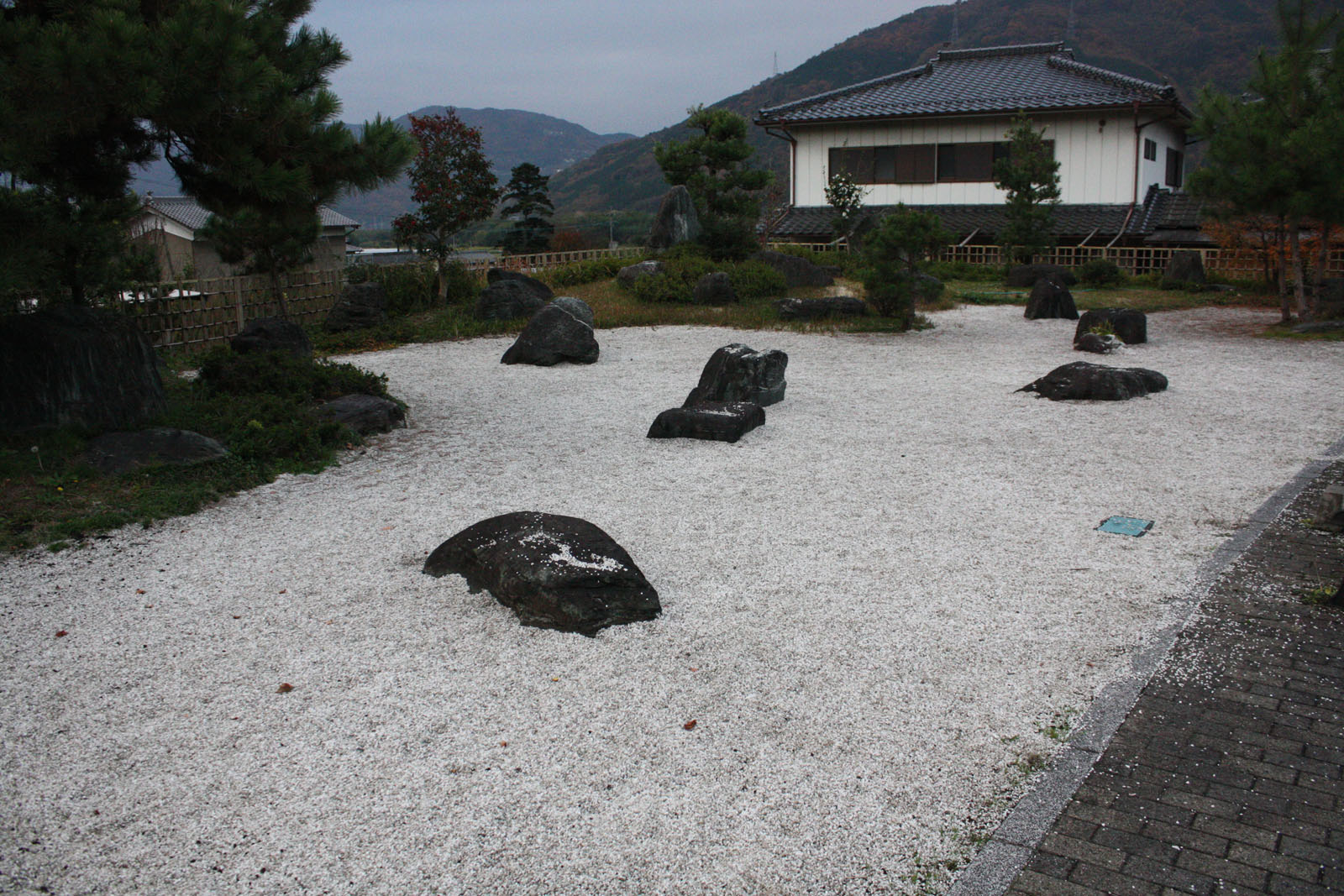
Rock Garden in Ikezuki Park

Created as a tribute to Mima's pride, Ikezuki, this park also serves as the resting place for Ikezuki's mother (horse). It features a rock garden, picnic area, and restroom facilities.

== Specialized products ==
=== Indigo dye ===
During the Edo and Meiji eras, Wakimachi prospered as an important distribution center of indigo dye (藍染め, aizome). The aizome season lasts from April to July and again from September to October.

=== Cymbidium ===
Cymbidium is a variety of Western-style orchid. The orchid is one of the most advanced plants in evolutionary history. Of these, the Cymbidium is one of the world's most cultivated. The orchid blooms from late November to March.

=== Paper umbrellas ===
Around 1955, there were about 200 stores lined up that were dedicated to the art of making paper umbrella in Mima. Today, two of the shops still exist. The masters of this traditional art construct the frame from bamboo, apply Japanese paper dyed with indigo, then oil it and apply various decorations, finishing it with a coat of lacquer.

=== Yuzu ===
Yuzu is first harvested in late fall. It is a yellow fruit that is common around the Mt. Tsurugi area as the weather breaks into winter. In recent years, the local farmers in the Koyadaira area have been producing yuzu using organic compost, with little or no agricultural chemicals. Lately, the product has been diversified with products such as organic yuzu ponzu and so on.

=== Hassaku oranges ===
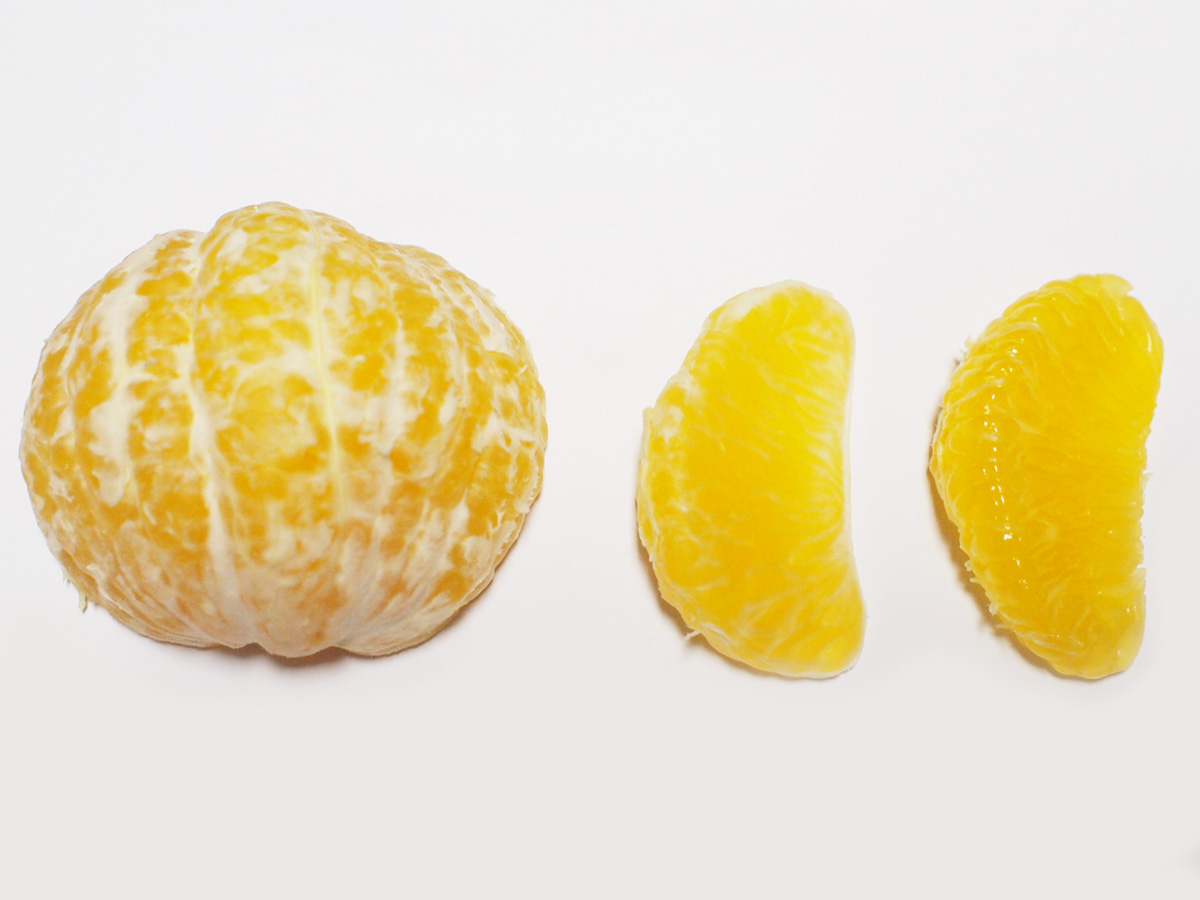
The interior sections of a Hassaku mandarin orange.

Hassaku oranges are harvested just as the frost begins to strengthen, at the end of December. They are then immediately put into storage until they ripen in February, after which they are shipped. In the Anabuki area, eco-farming efforts are being introduced as chemicals and fertilizers are being reduced and cut.

=== Grapes ===
In Mima, Delaware and Berry-A varieties of grapes are produced. They are harvested in two waves, one in mid-July and the other in mid-August. In Wakimachi, eco-farming efforts are being introduced as chemicals and fertilizers are being reduced and cut.

=== Blueberries ===
Blueberries are a healthy food well known for their power to keep the eyes active, refresh the capillaries, and fight oxidation and the effects of aging. In Mima, “The Association for the Research of Blueberries” was established whose aim is to find new products and uses for blueberries.

== Events ==
=== Homemade raft competition ===
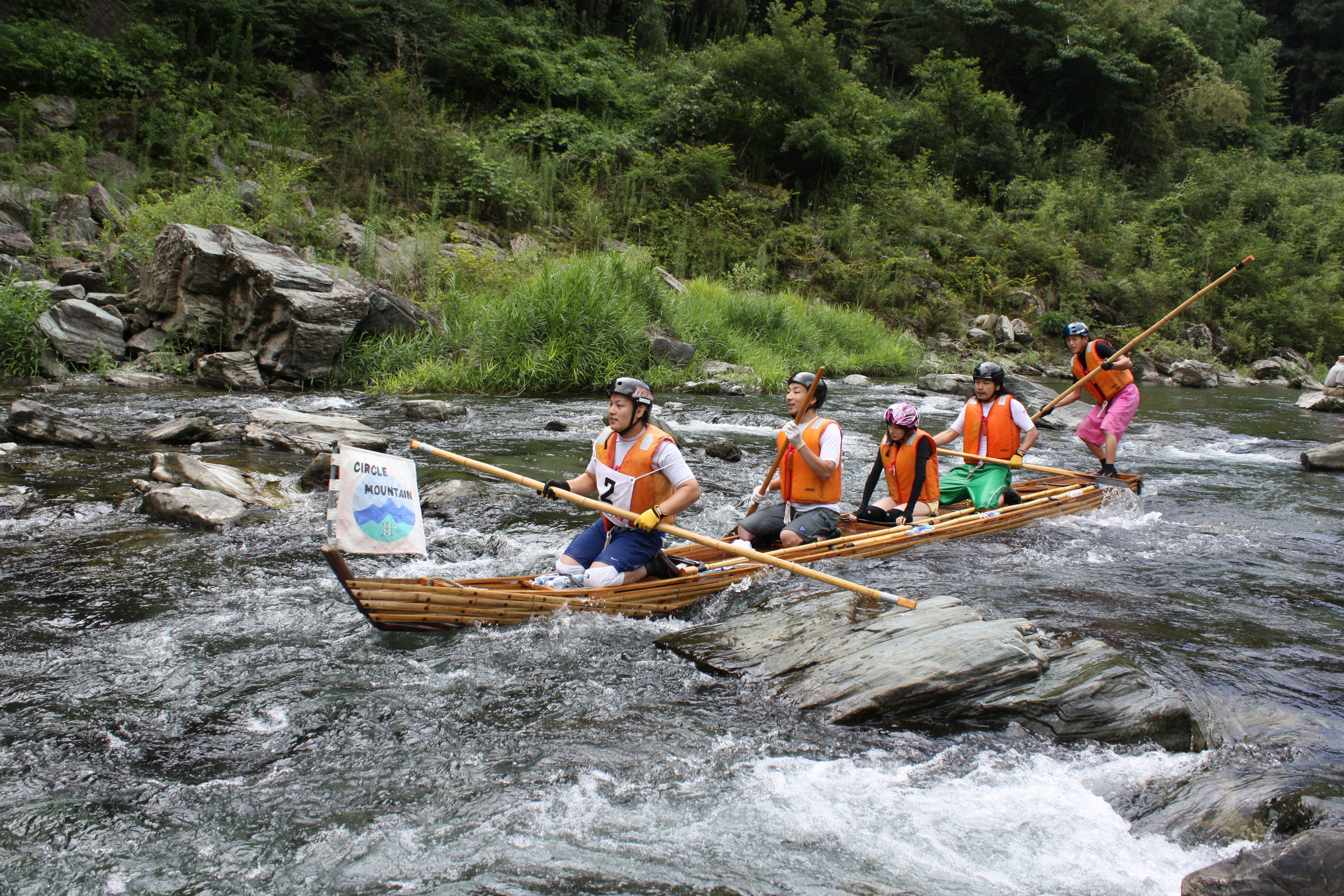
The 2009 champions of the Ikada Kudari competition

Each year, Anabuki hosts the Ikada Kudari, a homemade raft competition. Several teams prepare for the event by building rafts of various shapes and sizes. On the day of the event, the teams ride, pull, and push their rafts down a stretch of the Anabuki River. Awards are given, including the fastest and the most unusual rafts.

== Noted people from Mima ==
- Nitta Kuniteru, founder of the Confucian Shinto sect Shinto Shuseiha
- Yasutaka Hattori, former professional baseball pitcher
- Kuishinbo Kamen, Professional wrestler (Real Name: Akinori Tsukioka, Nihongo: 月岡 明則, Tsukioka Akinori)
