= Handa, Tokushima =

Dissolved municipality in Mima district, Tokushima prefecture, Japan

Handa (半田町, Handa-chō) was a town located in Mima District, Tokushima, Japan.

As of 2003, the town had an estimated population of 5,372 and a density of 104.27 persons per km^{2}. The total area was 51.52 km^{2}.

On March 1, 2005, Handa, along with the town of Sadamitsu, and the village of Ichiu (all from Mima District), was merged to create the town of Tsurugi.

== Geography ==
Handa was situated in the valley created by the Handa River. Most of the population was concentrated near the mouth of the valley, near the Yoshino River. Yachiyo, the southern part of Handa, was mountainous and contains a number of peaks over 1000 meters.

== Education ==
Handa was served by Handa Junior High School, and Handa and Yachiyo elementary schools.

== Transportation ==
- National Route 192 runs along Handa's northern edge.
- Awa-Handa Station is on the JR Shikoku Tokushima Line.

== Sightseeing ==
- Handa is famous for its sōmen noodles. "Handa Sōmen" has been a special product of the area for over 250 years, and several sōmen makers still operate today.
- Dodoro falls is a 30m waterfall in Yachiyo.
- Oyasu Park is a popular spot for viewing cherry blossoms, and provides good views of the main part of town.
- Ishido-yama (1636m) and Yahazu-yama (1848m), although located in Ichiu, are easily accessed via a trailhead at Oso Ishido Jinja, in Handa. Yahazu-yama provides panoramic views of the Iya Valley and prominent mountains such as Mount Tsurugi, Jirogyu, and Miune.
