= Sadamitsu, Tokushima =

Dissolved municipality in Tokushima prefecture, Japan

Sadamitsu (貞光町, Sadamitsu-chō) was a town located in Mima District, Tokushima Prefecture, Japan.

As of 2003, the town had an estimated population of 5,718 and a density of 125.95 persons per km^{2}. The total area was 45.40 km^{2}.

On March 1, 2005, Sadamitsu, along with the town of Handa, and the village of Ichiu (all from Mima District), was merged to create the town of Tsurugi.
