= Koyadaira, Tokushima =

Dissolved municipality in Tokushima prefecture, Japan

Koyadaira (木屋平村, Koyadaira-son) was a village located in Mima District, Tokushima Prefecture, Japan.

As of 2003, the village had an estimated population of 1,210 and a density of 11.98 persons per km^{2}. The total area was 100.97 km^{2}.

On March 1, 2005, Koyadaira, along with the towns of Mima (former), Anabuki, and Waki (all from Mima District), was merged to create the city of Mima.
