= Waki, Tokushima =

Dissolved municipality in Tokushima prefecture, Japan

Wakimachi (脇町, Waki-machi) was a town located in Mima District, Tokushima Prefecture, Japan.

As of 2003, the town had an estimated population of 18,160 and a density of 163.47 persons per km^{2}. The total area was 111.09 km^{2}.

On March 1, 2005, Wakimachi, along with the towns of Mima (former), Anabuki, and the village of Koyadaira (all from Mima District), were merged to create the city of Mima.

== See also ==
- Groups of Traditional Buildings
