= Sadamitsu Station =

Railway station in Tsurugi, Tokushima Prefecture, Japan

B18 Sadamitsu Station 貞光駅
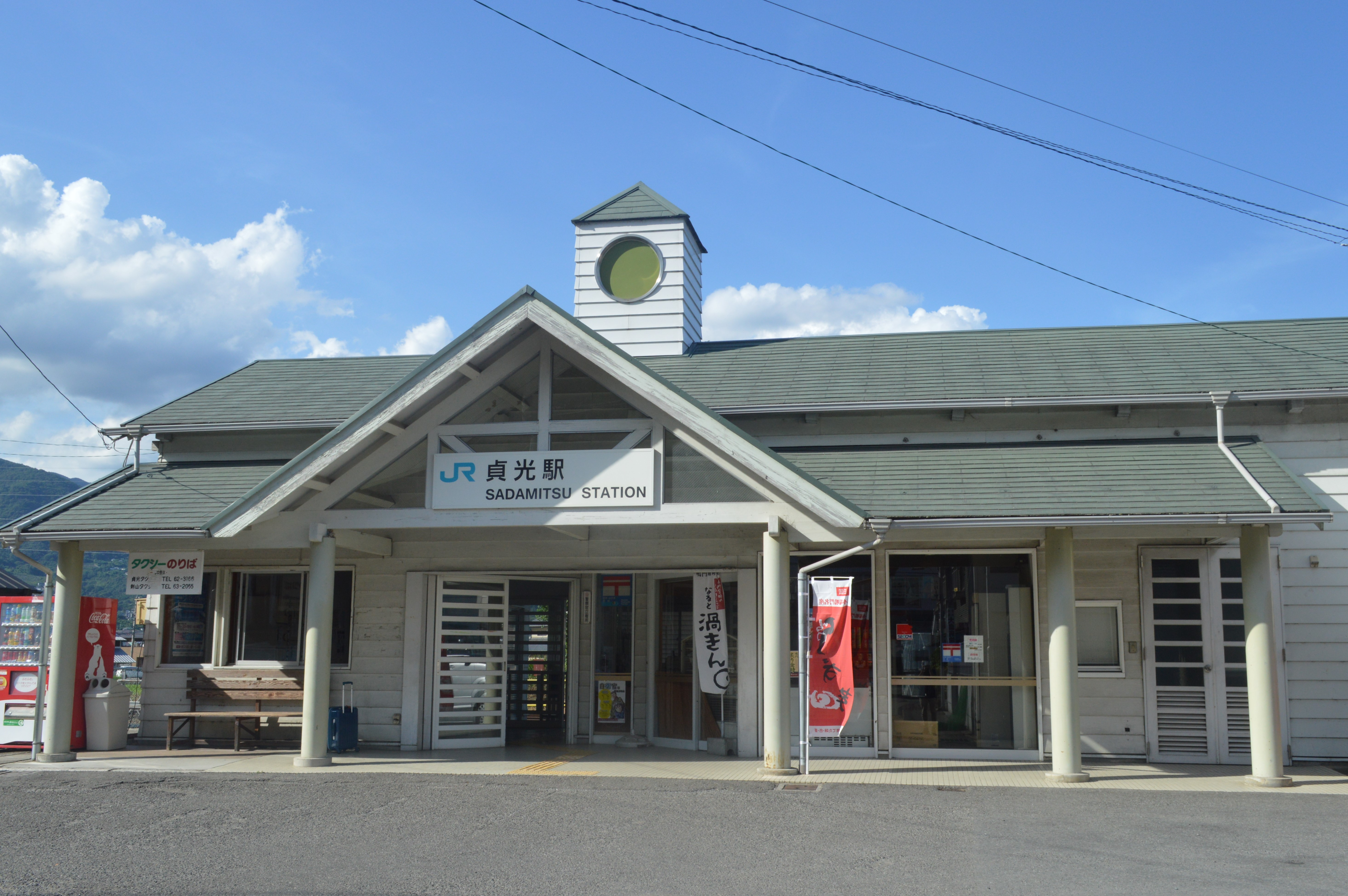
- Sadamitsu Station, 2022

General information
- Location: Umadashi Sadamitsu, Tsurugi-chō, Mima-gun, Tokushima-ken 779-4100; Japan
- Coordinates: 34°02′23″N 134°03′34″E
- Operator: JR Shikoku
- Line: ■ Tokushima Line
- Distance: 19.4 km from Tsukuda
- Platforms: 1 island platform
- Tracks: 2 + 1 siding + 1 passing loop

Construction
- Structure type: At grade
- Accessible: Yes - island platform accessed by level crossing and ramp

Other information
- Status: Kan'i itaku ticket window
- Station code: B18

History
- Opened: 25 March 1914
Location
- Location within Tokushima Prefecture Location within Japan

Sadamitsu Station (貞光駅, Sadamitsu-eki) is a passenger railway station located in the town of Tsurugi, Mima District, Tokushima Prefecture, Japan. It is operated by JR Shikoku and has the station number "B18".

== Lines ==
Sadamitsu Station is served by the Tokushima Line and is 19.4 km from the beginning of the line at Tsukuda. Besides local trains, the Tsurugisan limited express service also stops at Sadamitsu.

== Layout ==
The station consists of an island platform serving 2 tracks. A siding and a passing loop branch off track 2. Access to the island platform from the station building is by means of a level crossing and ramp. The station is unstaffed by JR Shikoku but a tenant has leased part of the building for office space and operates the ticket window (equipped with a POS ticket machine) as a kan'i itaku agent.

== Adjacent stations ==
«	Service	»
JR Limited Express Services
Anabuki	Tsurugisan	Awa-Kamo
Tokushima Line
Awa-Handa	Local	Oshima

== History ==
Sadamitsu Station was opened on 25 March 1914 as one of several intermediate stations built when Japanese Government Railways (JGR) extended the track of the Tokushima Main Line from Awa-Yamakawa to Awa-Ikeda. With the privatization of Japanese National Railways (JNR), the successor to JGR, on 1 April 1987, Sadamitsu came under the control of JR Shikoku. On 1 June 1988, the line was renamed the Tokushima Line.

== Surrounding area ==
- Tokushima Prefectural Tsurugi High School
- Tsurugi Town Hall
- Tsurugi Municipal Sadamitsu Elementary School
- Tsurugi Municipal Sadamitsu Junior High School

== See also ==
- List of railway stations in Japan
