= Anabuki, Tokushima =

Town in Mima district, Tokushima Prefecture, Japan

Anabuki (穴吹町, Anabuki-chō) was a town located in Mima District, Tokushima Prefecture, Japan.

As of 2003, the town had an estimated population of 7,444 and a density of 68.37 persons per km^{2}. The total area was 108.88 km^{2}.

On March 1, 2005, Anabuki, along with the towns of Mima (former) and Waki, and the village of Koyadaira (all from Mima District), was merged to create the city of Mima.
