= Mima District, Tokushima =

District in Tokushima prefecture, Japan

Coordinates: 33.975°N 134.051°E

Mima (美馬郡, Mima-gun) is a district located in Tokushima Prefecture, Japan.

Location in Tokushima Prefecture See SVG File with names

As of June 1, 2019, the district has an estimated population of 7,715 and a density of 40.4 persons per km^{2}. The total area is 194.84 km^{2}.

== Towns and villages ==
Two mergers left Mima District with a town and a city:

- Tsurugi

== Mergers ==
- March 1, 2005:
  - The towns of Mima, Anabuki and Waki, and the village of Koyadaira merged to form the city of Mima (Mima City).
  - The towns of Handa, Sadamitsu, and the village of Ichiu merged to form the town of Tsurugi
