= Mount Tsurugi (Tokushima) =

Mountain in the country of Japan

- 剣山
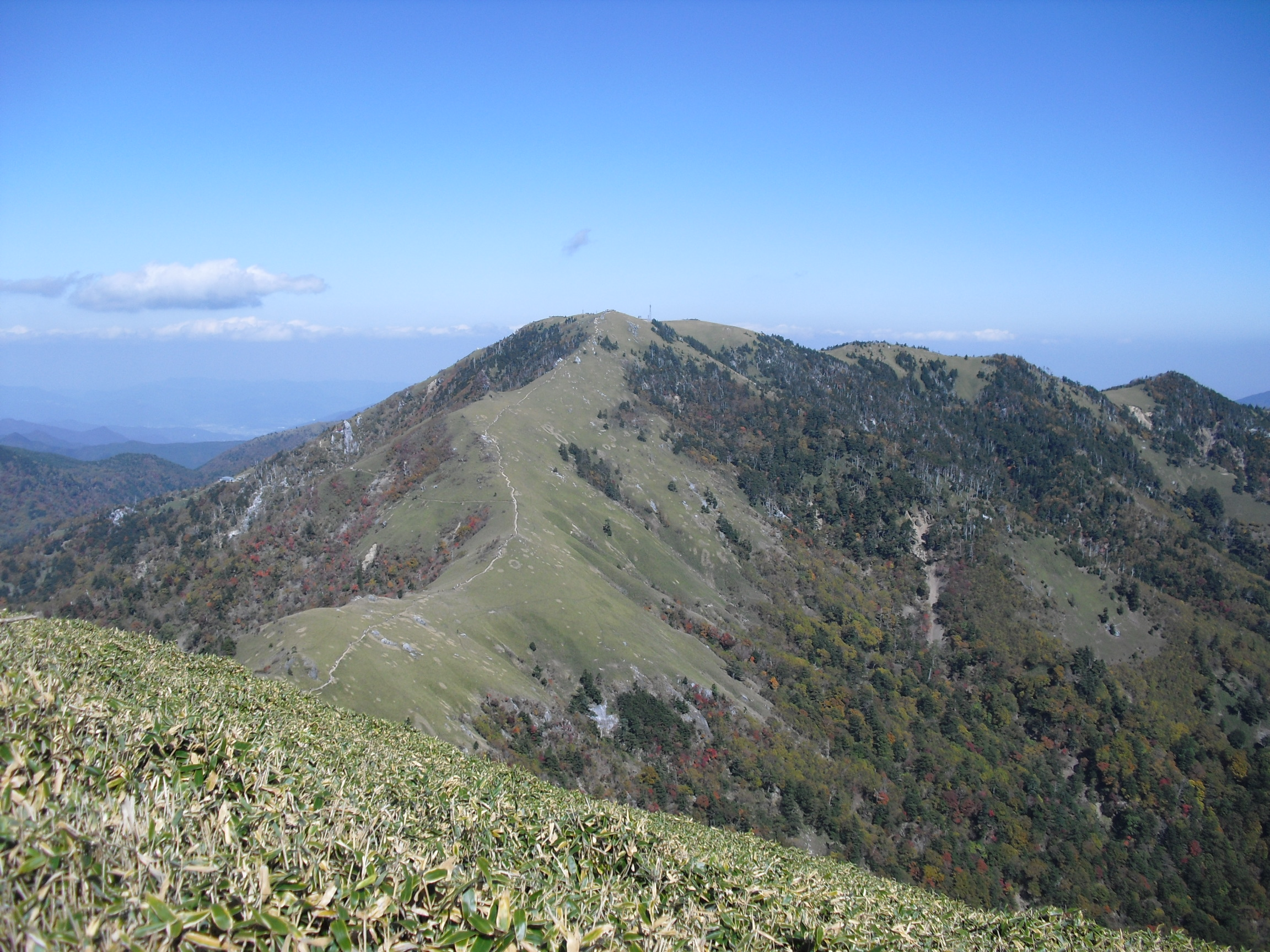

Highest point
- Elevation: 1,954.7 m (6,413 ft)
- Prominence: 1,540 m (5,050 ft)
- Listing: Ultra, Ribu
- Coordinates: 33°51′13″N 134°05′39″E

Naming
- Language of name: Japanese

Geography
- Location within Japan
- Location: On the border of Miyoshi, Mima and Naka, Tokushima, Japan
- Parent range: Shikoku Mountains

Geology
- Mountain type: Upheaval Peneplain

Mount Tsurugi (剣山, Tsurugi-san), meaning sword, is a 1,954.7-metre-high (6,413.1 ft) mountain on the border of Miyoshi, Mima and Naka in Tokushima Prefecture, Japan. This mountain is one of the 100 Famous Japanese Mountains.

== Outline ==
Mount Tsurugi is the second highest mountain on the island of Shikoku, and also the second highest mountain west of Mount Haku, which is on the border of Ishikawa and Gifu prefectures in central Japan.

Mount Tsurugi is an important object of worship in this region and one of the centers of Shugendō, a sect of mixture of Shinto and Buddhism. On the top of the mountain, there is a small shrine called ‘Tsurugi Jinja’.

The area around Mount Tsurugi is a major part of Tsurugi Quasi-National Park.

== Climate ==
Mount Tsurugi has an altitude-affected humid continental climate (Köppen climate classification Dfb) with mild summers and cold winters.

Climate data for Mount Tsurugi (1961−1990 normals, extremes 1961-2001)
Month	Jan	Feb	Mar	Apr	May	Jun	Jul	Aug	Sep	Oct	Nov	Dec	Year
Record high °C (°F)	8.1 (46.6)	10.7 (51.3)	13.9 (57.0)	19.9 (67.8)	20.8 (69.4)	22.8 (73.0)	24.8 (76.6)	24.2 (75.6)	22.7 (72.9)	19.1 (66.4)	16.0 (60.8)	12.6 (54.7)	24.8 (76.6)
Mean daily maximum °C (°F)	−4.1 (24.6)	−3.1 (26.4)	0.5 (32.9)	7.1 (44.8)	11.4 (52.5)	14.4 (57.9)	17.9 (64.2)	18.2 (64.8)	15.2 (59.4)	9.8 (49.6)	5.0 (41.0)	−0.8 (30.6)	7.7 (45.9)
Daily mean °C (°F)	−7.3 (18.9)	−6.6 (20.1)	−3.3 (26.1)	3.3 (37.9)	7.7 (45.9)	11.3 (52.3)	15.1 (59.2)	15.3 (59.5)	12.1 (53.8)	6.3 (43.3)	1.3 (34.3)	−4.3 (24.3)	4.2 (39.6)
Mean daily minimum °C (°F)	−10.3 (13.5)	−9.9 (14.2)	−6.9 (19.6)	−0.3 (31.5)	4.3 (39.7)	8.6 (47.5)	12.9 (55.2)	13.2 (55.8)	9.6 (49.3)	3.3 (37.9)	−1.9 (28.6)	−7.3 (18.9)	1.3 (34.3)
Record low °C (°F)	−19.2 (−2.6)	−23.5 (−10.3)	−19.1 (−2.4)	−13.2 (8.2)	−7.0 (19.4)	−0.7 (30.7)	4.8 (40.6)	5.8 (42.4)	−1.2 (29.8)	−7.6 (18.3)	−13.5 (7.7)	−18.1 (−0.6)	−23.5 (−10.3)
Average precipitation mm (inches)	126.4 (4.98)	146.9 (5.78)	207.6 (8.17)	210.9 (8.30)	277.7 (10.93)	463.3 (18.24)	435.0 (17.13)	517.0 (20.35)	533.1 (20.99)	223.7 (8.81)	138.8 (5.46)	90.8 (3.57)	3,371.2 (132.71)
Average snowfall cm (inches)	87 (34)	89 (35)	72 (28)	17 (6.7)	0 (0)	0 (0)	0 (0)	0 (0)	0 (0)	1 (0.4)	11 (4.3)	48 (19)	327 (129)
Average precipitation days (≥ 1.0 mm)	16.9	15.1	16.6	13.1	12.7	15.6	16.3	15.5	15.6	11.8	10.1	13.1	172.4
Average snowy days	20.3	18.2	15.1	3.9	0.5	0.0	0.0	0.0	0.0	1.1	5.5	15.0	79.6
Average relative humidity (%)	81	81	80	76	75	85	90	91	89	80	76	78	82
Mean monthly sunshine hours	112.1	110.7	145.7	157.6	168.7	112.3	110.5	113.8	99.0	128.5	123.5	122.6	1,505
Percentage possible sunshine	36	36	40	40	39	26	25	28	27	37	40	40	34
Source 1: NOAA
Source 2: JMA (precipitation and extremes)

== Access ==
- The main trailhead, along with parking lots, shops and restaurants, is located at Minokoshi, at the intersection of national routes 438 and 439. From Minokoshi, climbers may also ride a chairlift to a higher point on the trail.
- Trails link the summit of Mount Tsurugi to neighboring mountains. Tsurugi can be reached from the east via Ichinomori, while an extensive network of trails to the west allows access from mountains such as Jirogyu, Miune, and Tengu-zuka.
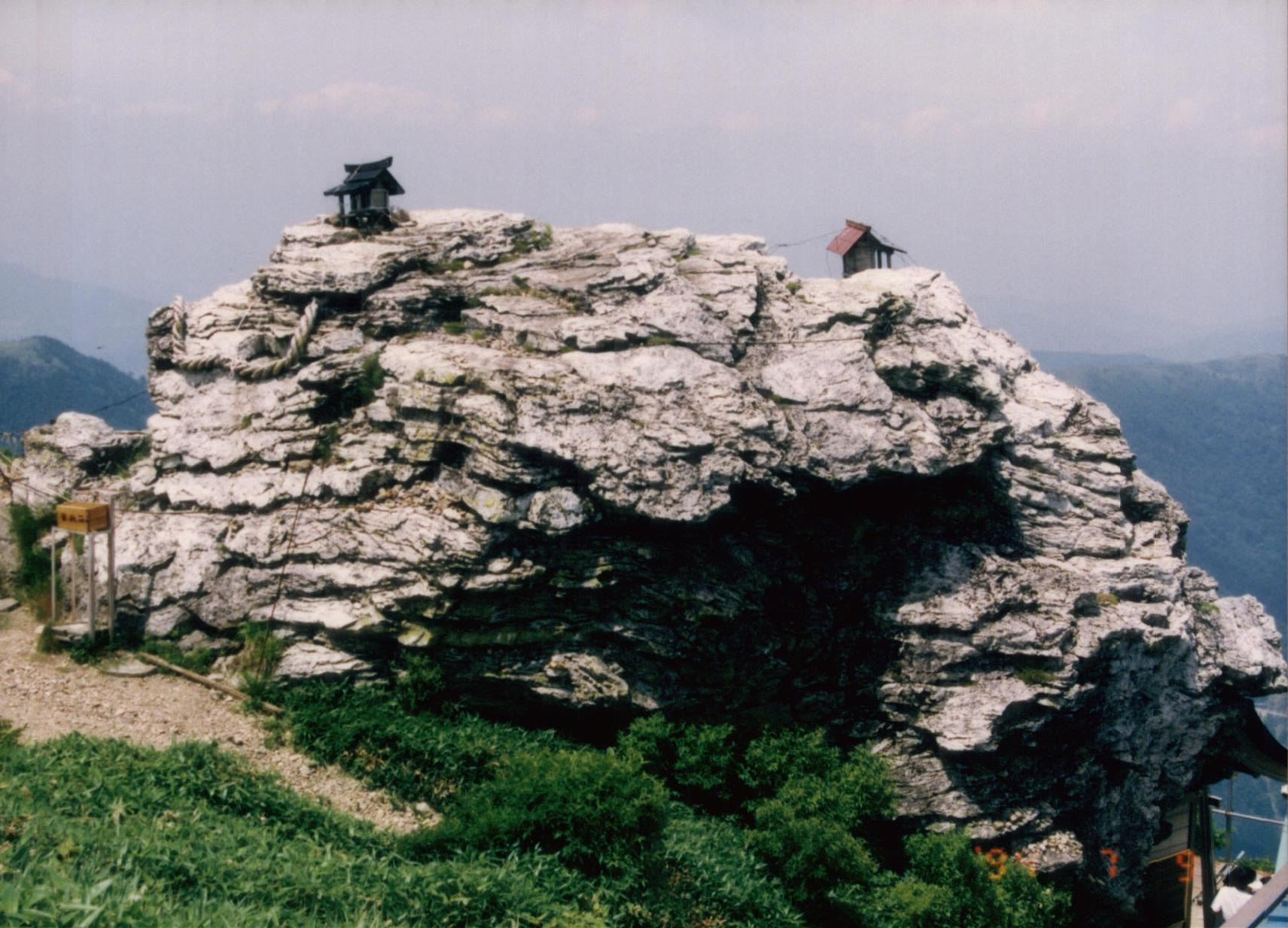
Tsurugi Jinja (Tsurugi Shrine) on the top of Mount Tsurugi

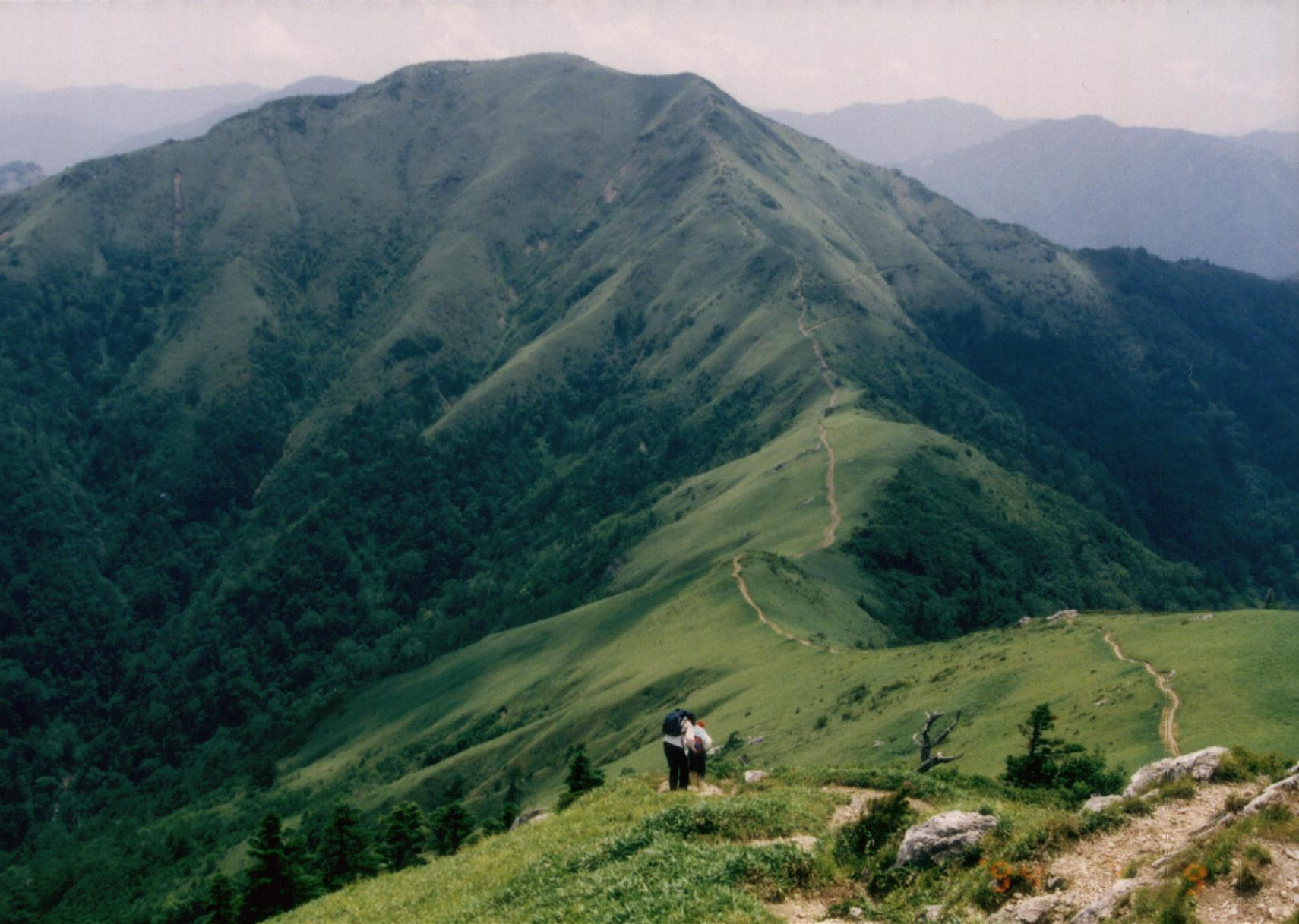
Mount Jirogyu from the top of Mount Tsurugi

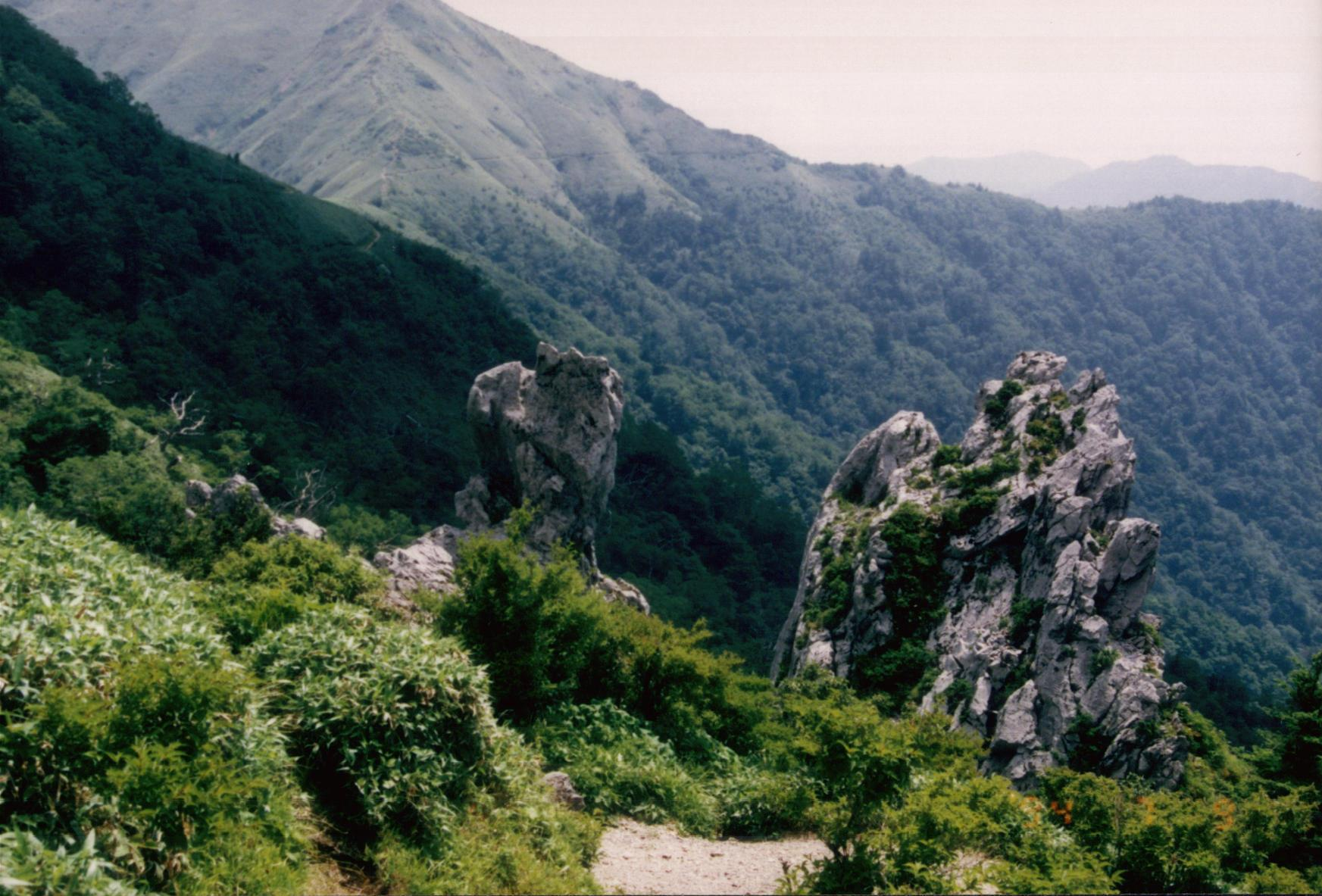
A view of the middle of Mount Tsurugi

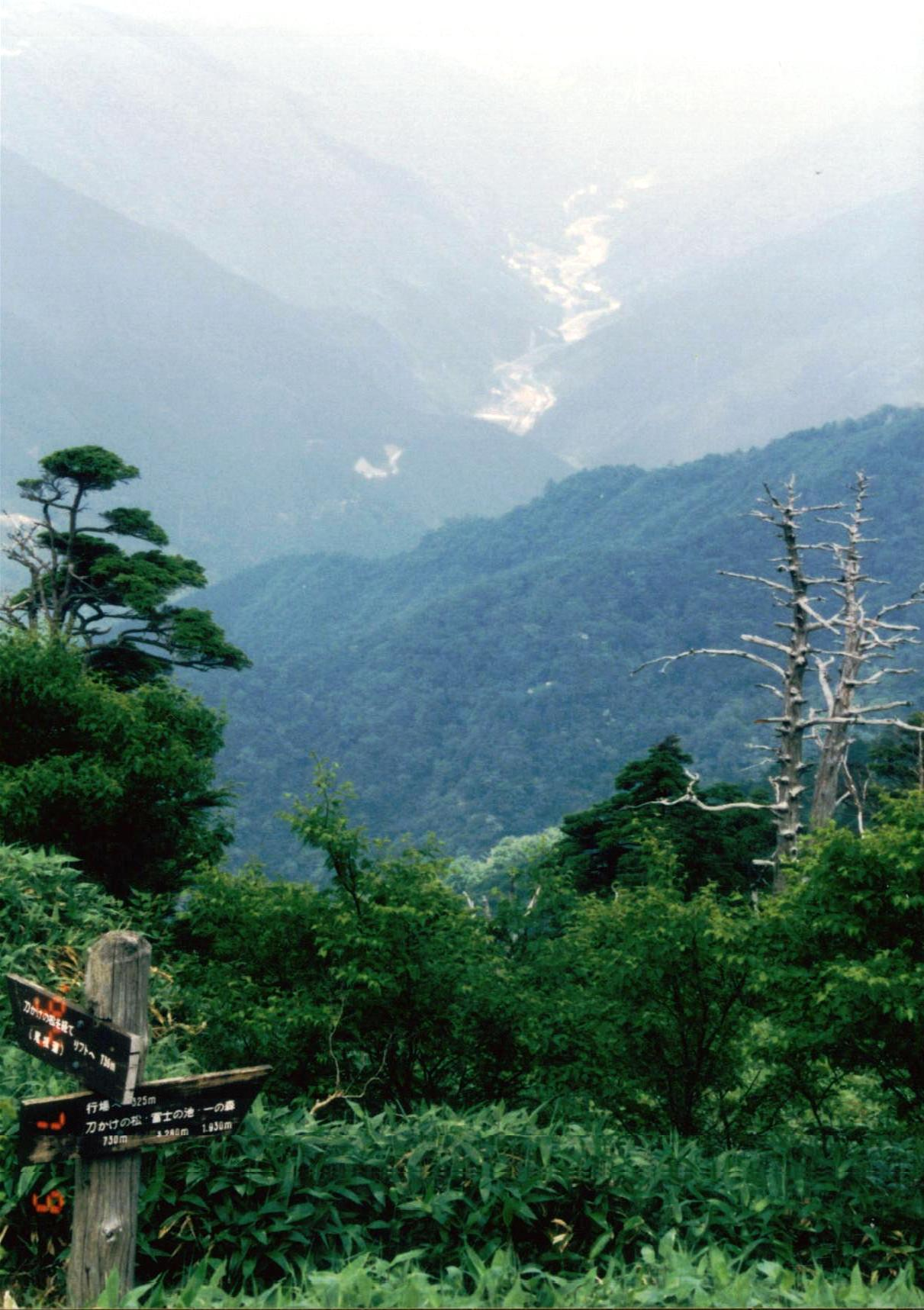
Another view of the middle of Mount Tsurugi

== See also ==
- List of Ultras of Japan
- Tsurugisan (train), a train service named after Mount Tsurugi in Tokushima
