= Mount Katsuragi =

Mount Katsuragi (葛城山, Katsuragi-san) is a name used for multiple mountains in Japan. It can refer to:

- Mount Izumi Katsuragi, on the border of Osaka and Wakayama Prefectures
- Mount Minami Katsuragi, east of Mt. Izumi Katsuragi, south of Mount Iwawaki
- Mount Naka Katsuragi, south of Mt. Kongō
- Mount Yamato Katsuragi, straddling the prefectural line between Nara and Osaka Prefectures
- Mount Katsuragi (Izunokuni) on the Izu Peninsula, Shizuoka

When read "Katsuragi-yama," it collectively refers to Mount Kongō and Mount Yamato Katsuragi

== See also ==
- Kongō Range, a mountain range which was formerly called the Katsuragi Range
