= Mount Izumi Katsuragi =

Mountain in Japan

- 和泉葛城山; Izumi Katsuragi-san
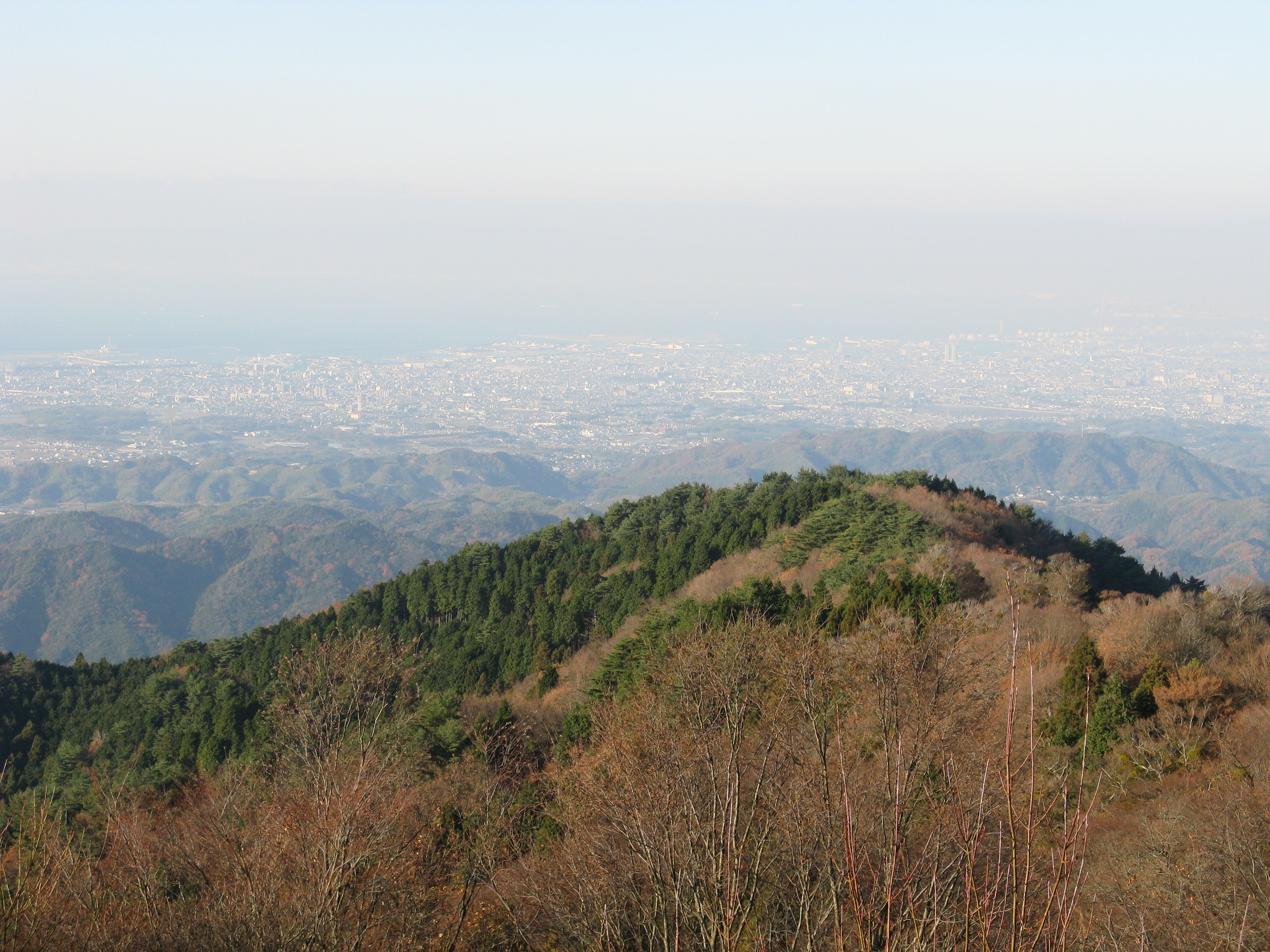
- Mount Izumi Katsuragi from the viewing platform

Highest point
- Elevation: 858 (Note: According to the Hachidairyūō Shrine (八大竜王社, Hachidairyūōsha), the summit is 858 meters in elevation, and many sources use them. However, other sources indicate the summit may be only 865.7 metres (2,840 ft).) m (2,815 ft)
- Coordinates: 34°20′53″N 135°26′03″E

Naming
- English translation: Izumi Kudzu Castle Mountain
- Language of name: Japanese

Geography
- Location within Japan
- Location: Mount Izumi Katsuragi is located in Kishiwada and Kaizuka, Osaka, and in Kinokawa, Wakayama, Japan
- Parent range: Kongō Range

Mount Izumi Katsuragi (和泉葛城山, Izumi Katsuragi-san) is a mountain in the Kongō Range straddling the border between Osaka and Wakayama Prefectures in Japan. Its peak elevation is 858 metres (2,815 ft).

== Location and naming ==
Mount Izumi Katsuragi is an 858 metres (2,815 ft) mountain located on the Kongō Range, straddling the prefectural boundary between Osaka and Wakayama in Japan. Parts of the mountain lie in Kishiwada and Kaizuka, Osaka, as well as in Kinokawa, Wakayama.

The Izumiyama Chain and the Kongō Range form a 120 kilometres (75 mi) long L-shaped range called the Kongō - Izumi Katsuragi Mountain Range (金剛・和泉葛城山系, Kongō - Izumi Katsuragi Sankei), extending along the border between Osaka, Nara, and Wakayama, including Mount Yamato Katsuragi. Mount Izumi Katsuragi has been known as the heart of the Katsuragi Mountains since ancient times.

The 9th sutra mound of the Katsuragi 28 Shuku is found on the summit of Mount Izumi Katsuragi.

=== Environs ===
The north slope of Mount Izumi Katsuragi is covered in a wood of Japanese beech, which favor growing at elevations high enough to remain fairly cool. Harvesting the trees in this wood is forbidden by the association of Hachidairyūō shrines and temples, and this is the southernmost stand of Japanese beech on Honshū. The trees in the area were designated a national protected species in 1923, allowing them to continue to thrive in an area very close to suburban and urban growth.

== Access and amenities ==
Mount Izumi Katsuragi is easily accessible by car from three different directions, with all three roads meeting near the summit. There is also a Nankai Wing Bus which travels between the bus stop at Kishiwada Station and the Ushitakiyama (牛滝山) bus stop near the base of the mountain. From there, it takes about 60 minutes to hike to the summit.

There are no lodging, toilet, or food services at the summit.

== Gallery ==
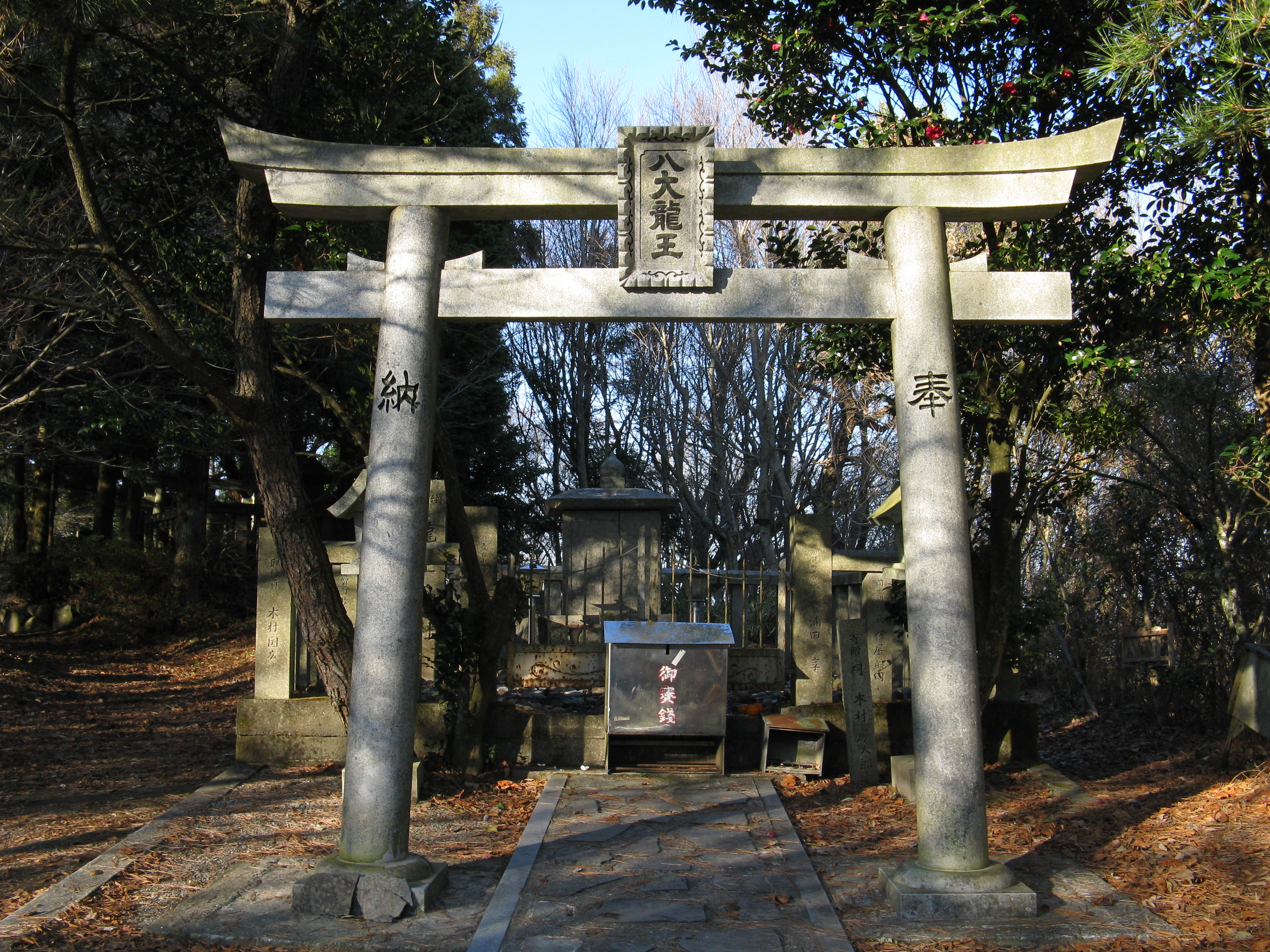
Hachidairyūō Shrine, near the base of the mountain

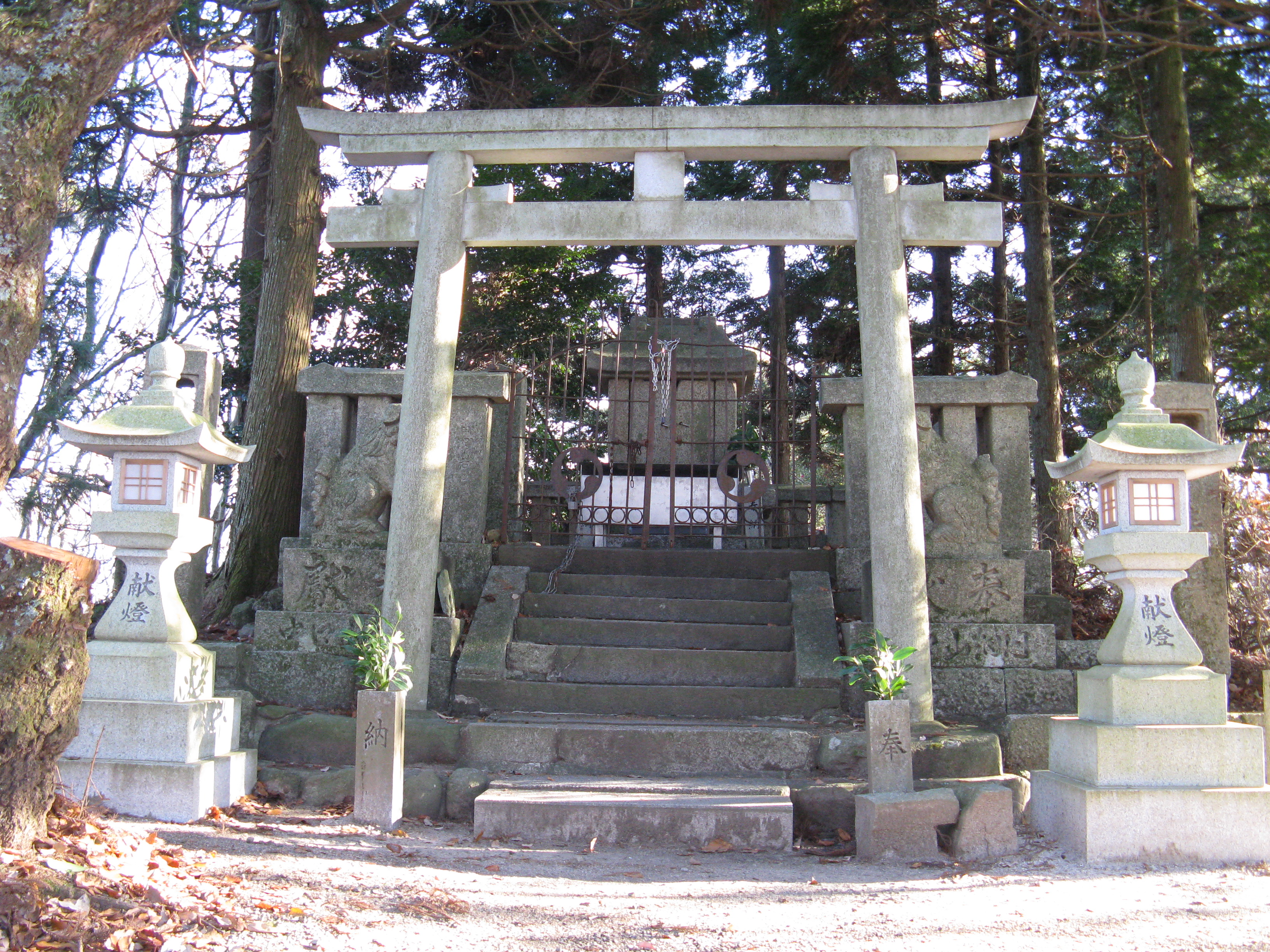
Katsuragi Shrine, near the base of the mountain.

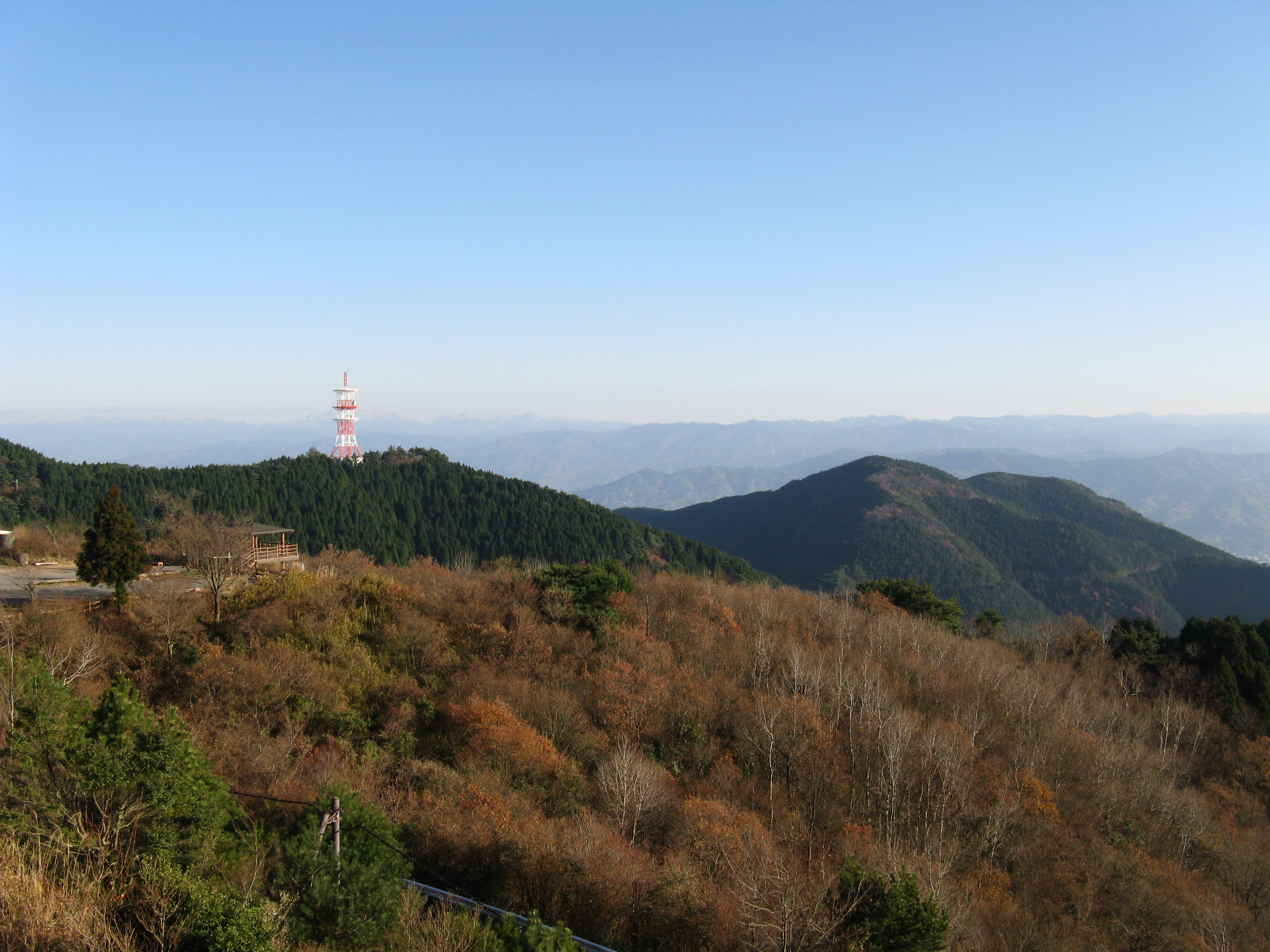
Looking SE from viewing platform

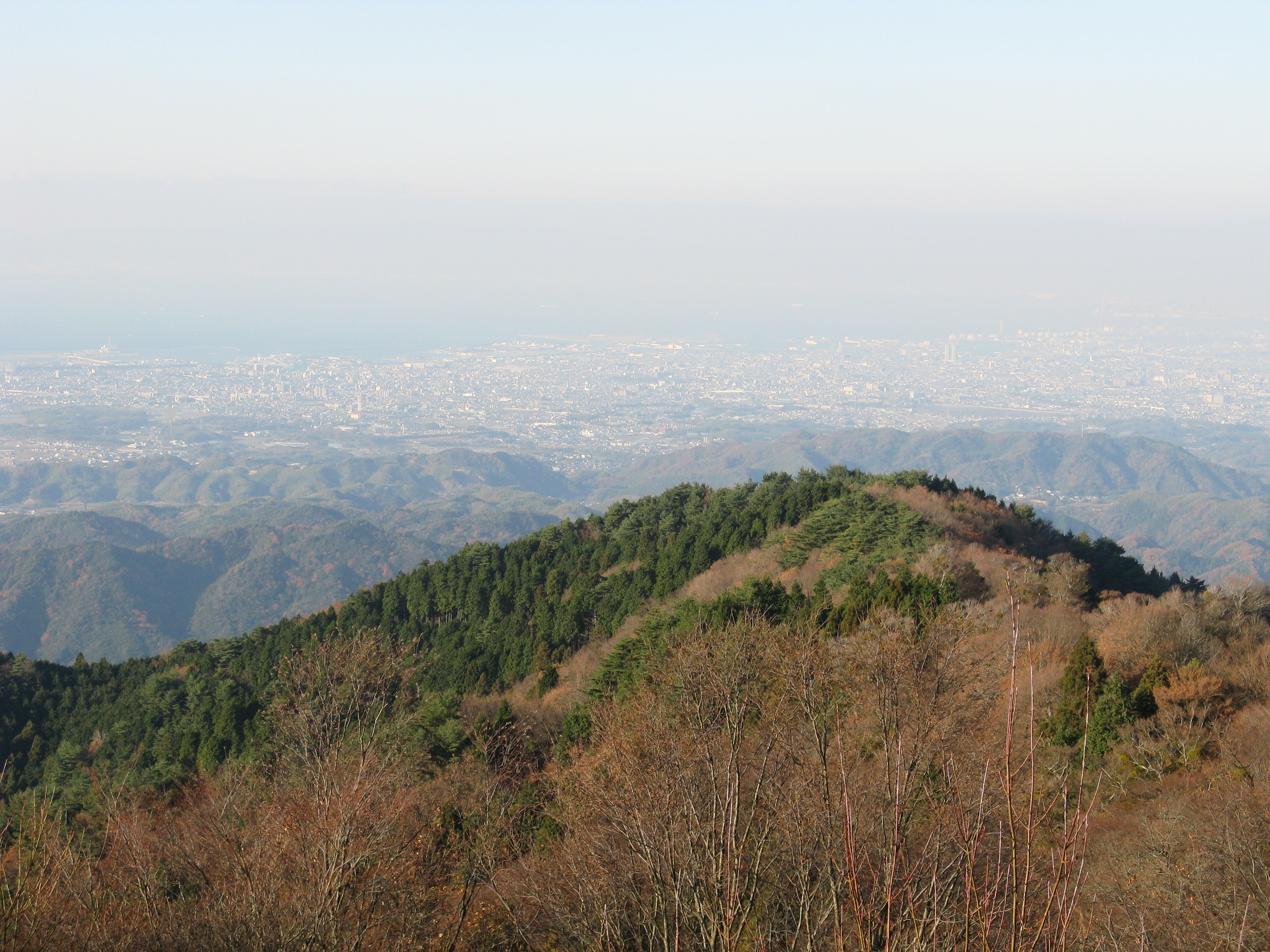
Looking NNW from viewing platform

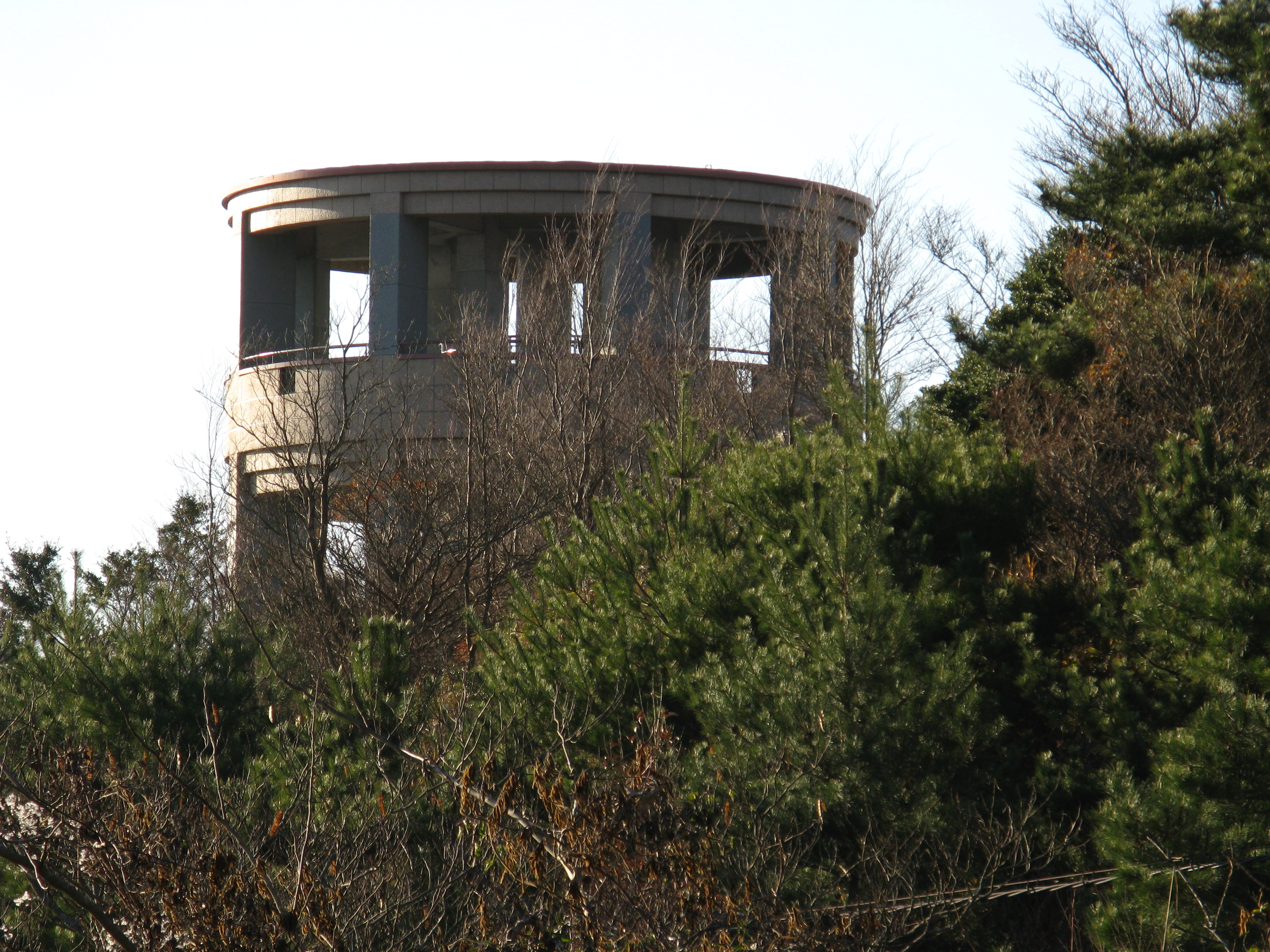
viewing platform

== See also ==
- Mount Minami Katsuragi
- Mount Naka Katsuragi
- Mount Yamato Katsuragi
