= Mount Nijō =

Mountain in Japan

- 二上山; Nijōzan
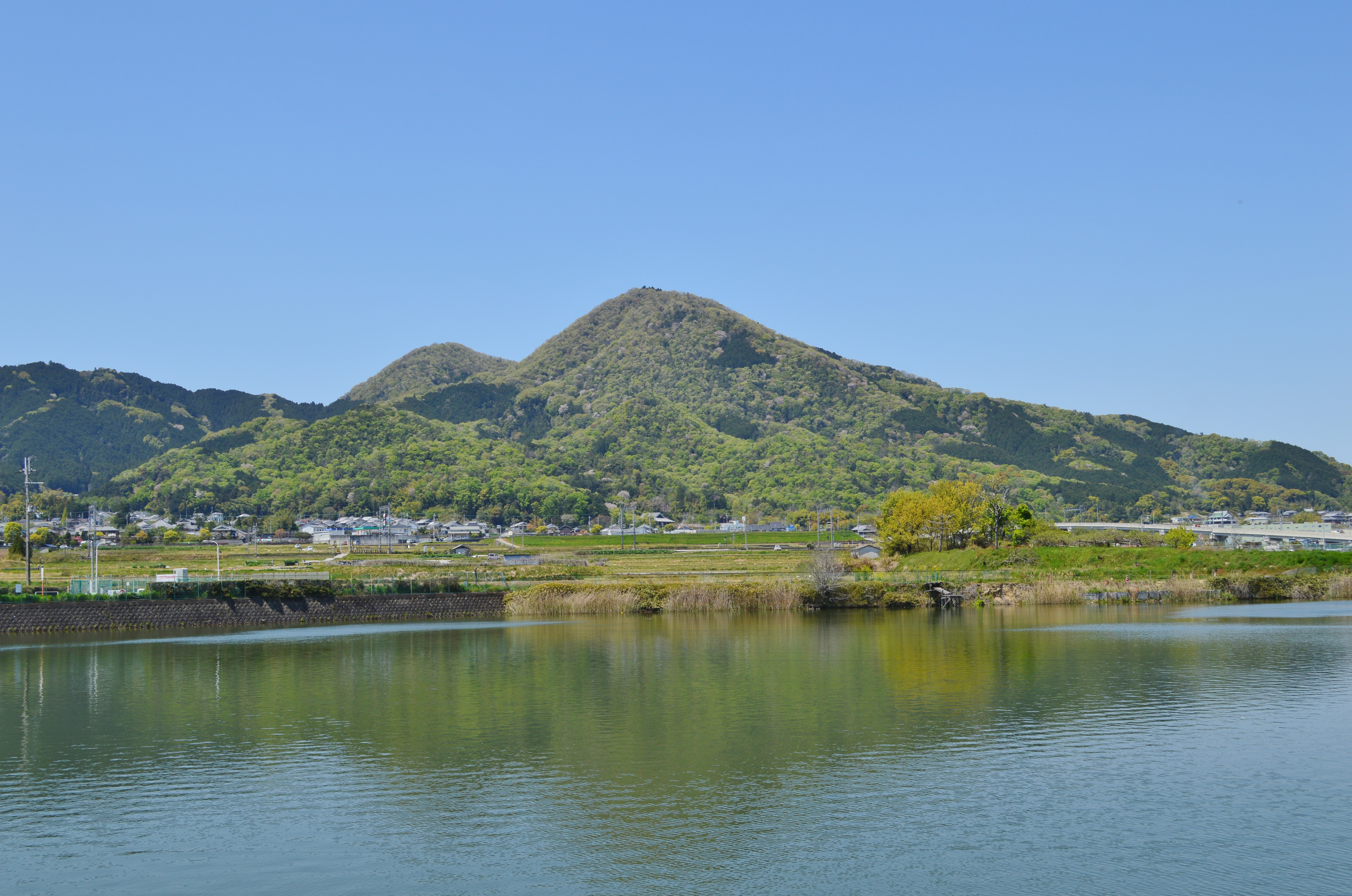
- Photo of the twin peaks、Odake (517m) and Medake (474m)

Highest point
- Elevation: 517 m (1,696 ft)
- Coordinates: 34°31′21″N 135°40′33″E

Geography
- Location within Japan
- Location: Mount Nijō is located between Taishi and Katsuragi, Japan
- Parent range: Kongō Range

Mount Nijō (二上山, Nijōzan) is a mountain in the Kongō Range straddling the prefectural border between Taishi, Osaka and Katsuragi, Nara in Japan. Mount Nijō has twin peaks, Odake (517m) and Medake (474m). From the top there are sweeping views of Nara's basin, Osaka plain and Osaka bay.

Mount Nijō is located along the Minami Osaka Line of the Kintetsu Railway and is accessible on several different hiking trails on all sides of varying difficulty and length. The mountain forms part of the diamond trail, which is a 45 km-long trail running along the Kongō mountain range separating Nara, Osaka and Wakayama Prefectures. Heading south along the diamond trail is Mount Yamato Katsuragi (about 8.6 km) and Mount Kongō (about 14.1 km).

According to the Man'yōshū, Mount Nijō was known as ‘Futakamiyama’ which means twin mountains. This mountain is worshipped by local people as a gateway to heaven. Mt Nijō was an active volcano millions of years ago. As a result of the eruptions it distributed igneous rock, sanukite, tuff and emery powder. Remnants of its eruptions can be seen at Donzurubō towards the north of Mount Nijō.

== Access ==
A number of hiking trails are accessible from all sides of Mount Nijō.

- The official start of the diamond trail starts at Donzurubō in the North. There is parking located close to Donzurubō, otherwise it is accessible by foot from Kaminotaishi station, Sekiya station, Nijō station and Nijōzan station. Following the diamond trail leads to the summit of Mount Nijō and takes about 1 hour 30 minutes.
- Starting from Nijō station or Nijōzan station there are two separate hiking trails that leads to Mount Nijō. Both trails takes about 1 hour 15 minutes.
- Starting your hike from Taimadera station in Katsuragi, the trail goes west for about 20 minutes until Taimadera temple. From the temple the ascent begins towards the summit of Mount Nijō passing through Kasadou, Toritaniguchi Kofun and Yusenji. In total, this course takes about 1 hour 45 minutes.
- The diamond trail intersects with Takenouchi Kaidō and from Takenouchi Kaidō it takes about 35 minutes to reach the summit area of Mount Nijō.
- If following the diamond trail from Mount Yamato Katsuragi, the path is roughly 8.6 km long and takes about 4 hours.

== Places of interest ==
There are a number of notable relics, temples and shrines located close by to Mount Nijo.

- Rokutanijiseki (鹿谷寺跡)
- Prince Otsu's tomb (大津皇子墓)
- Taimadera (當麻寺)
- Donzurubō (屯鶴峯)
- Kasadou (傘堂)
- Toritaniguchi Kofun (鳥谷口古墳)
- Yusenji (祐泉寺)
- Iwaya (岩屋)
- Kasuga Shrine in Kashiba (春日神社)
- 26th sutra mound of the Katsuragi 28 Shuku

== Gallery ==
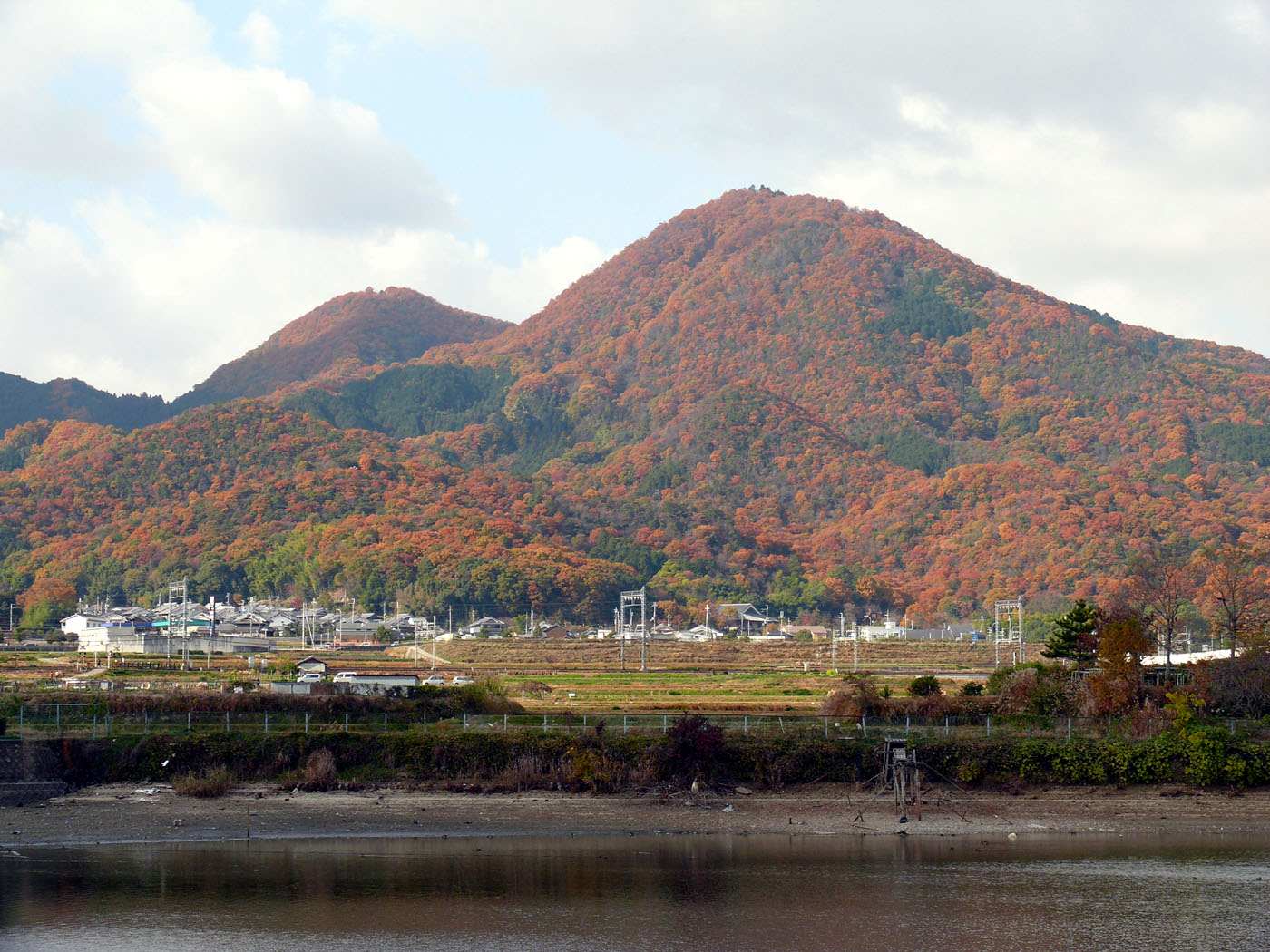
Mt Nijō in Autumn

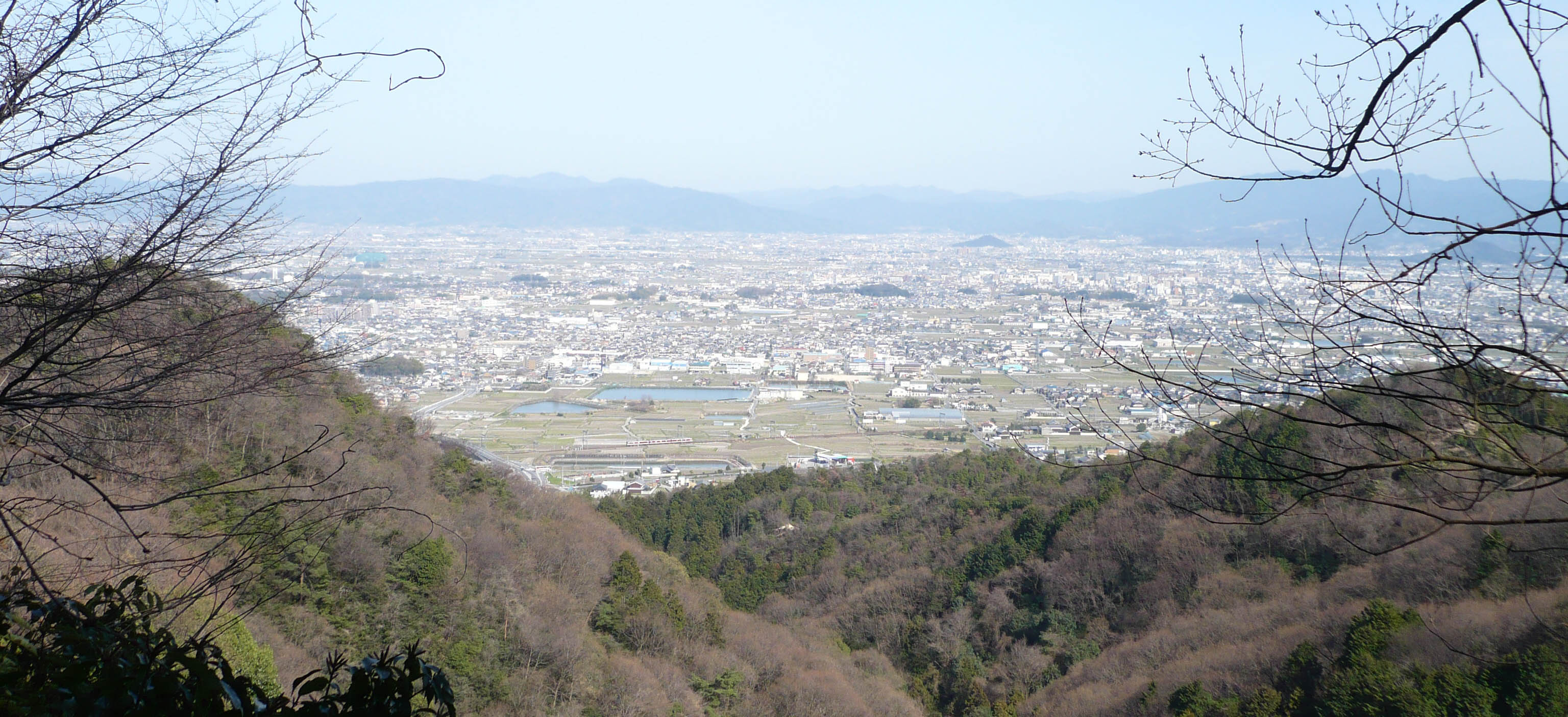
View from Mount Nijō

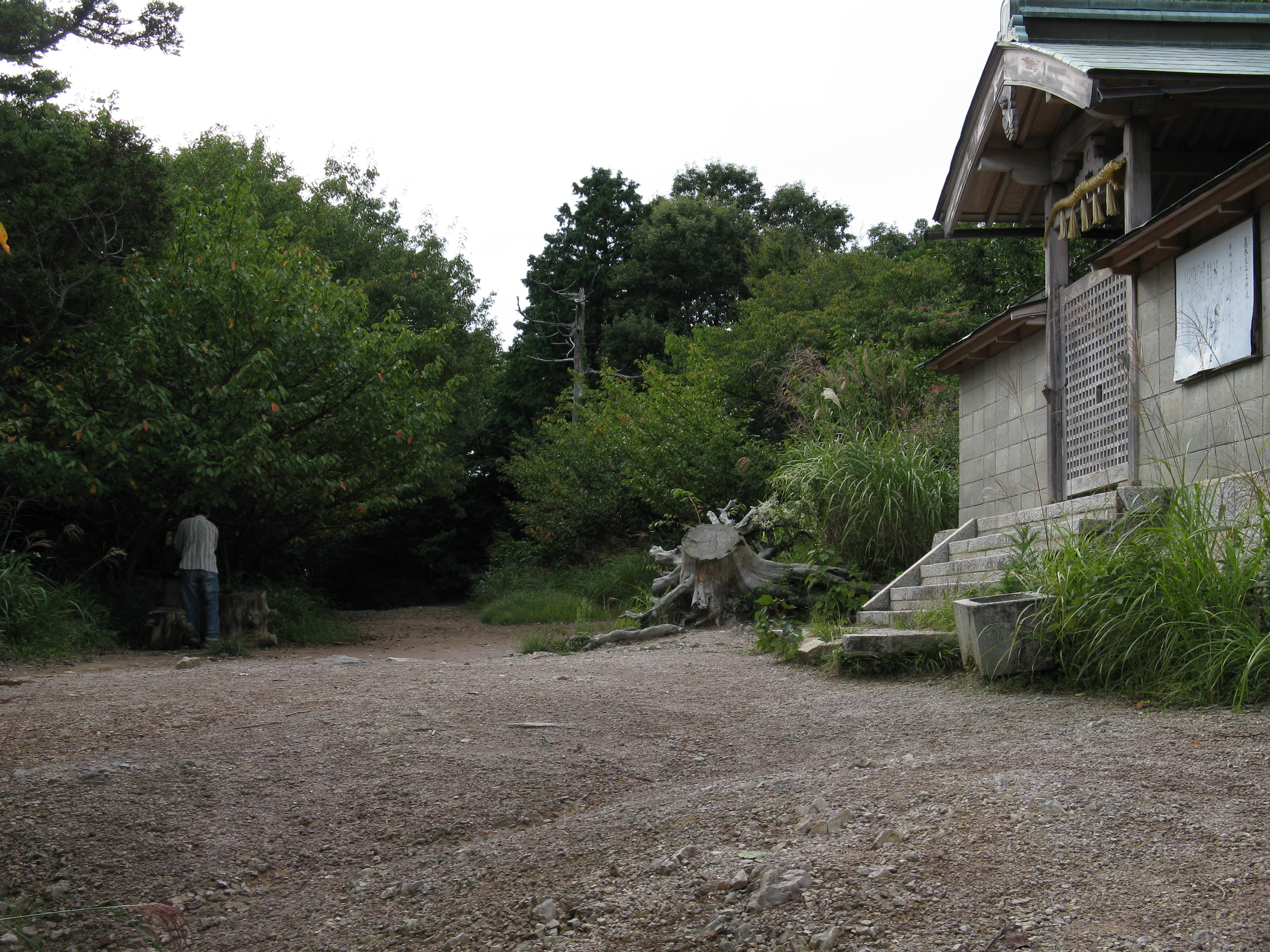
Odake peak

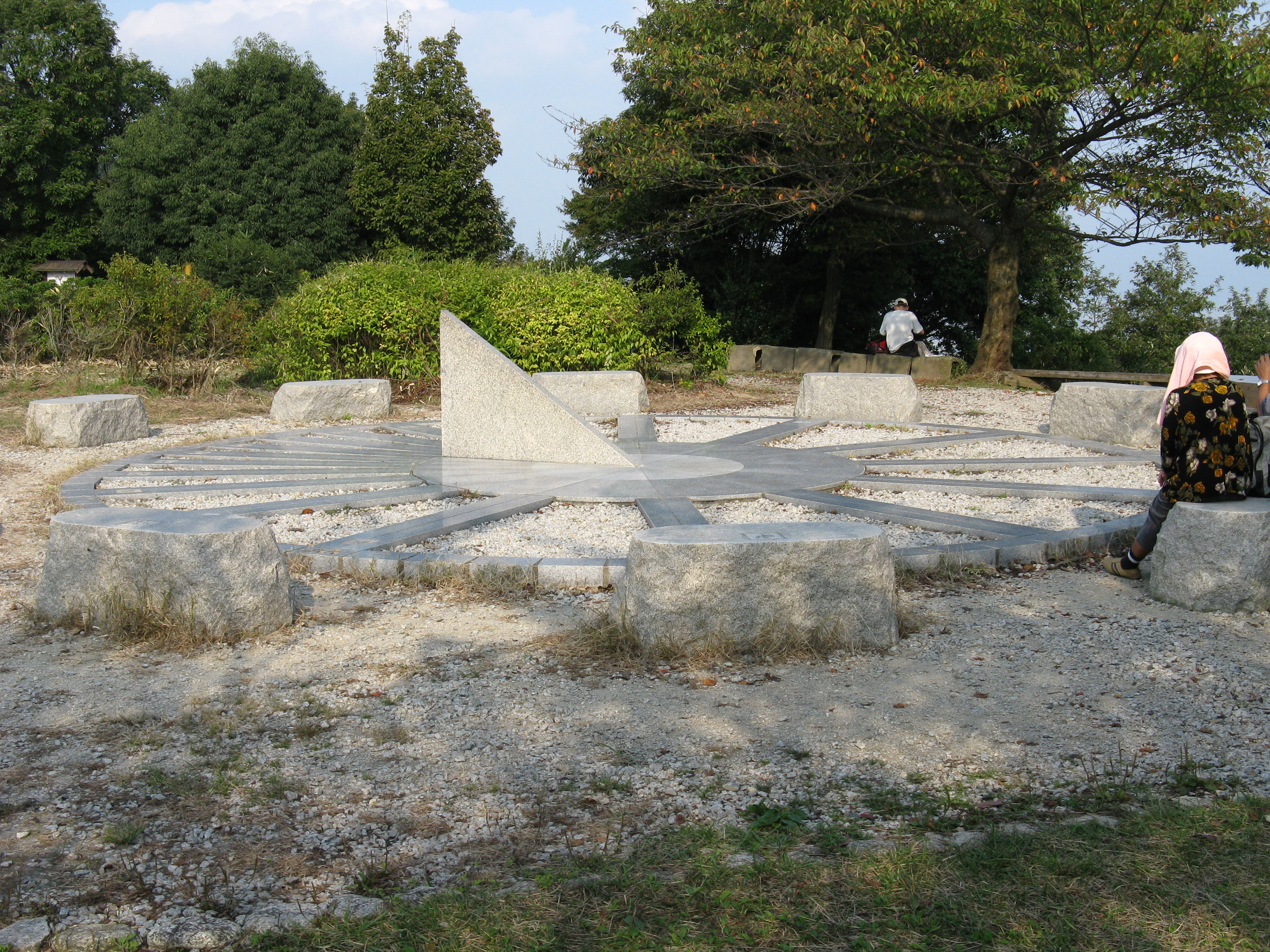
Medake peak - with sundial

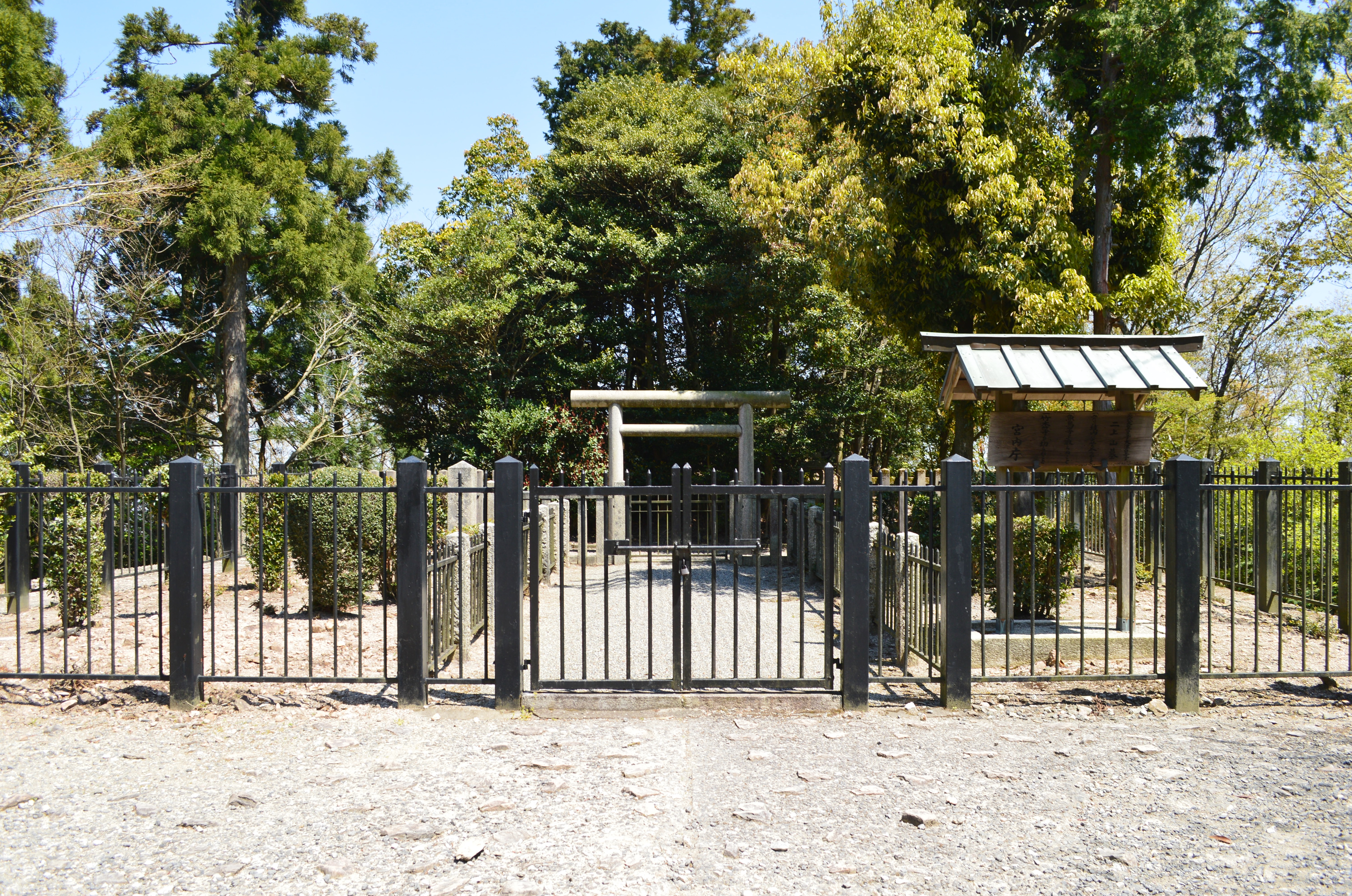
Tomb of Prince Otsu - Located near Odake peak

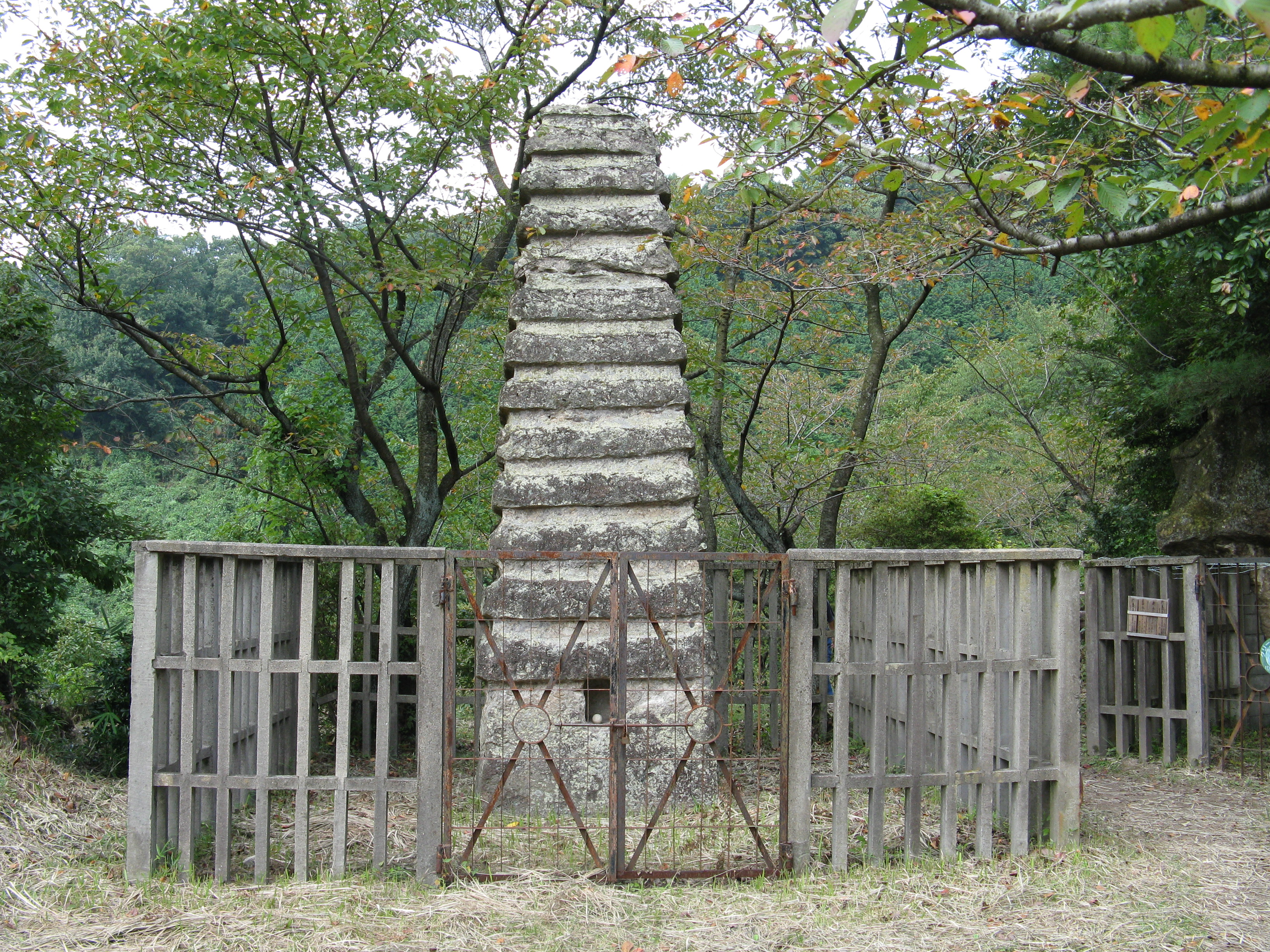
Rokutanji

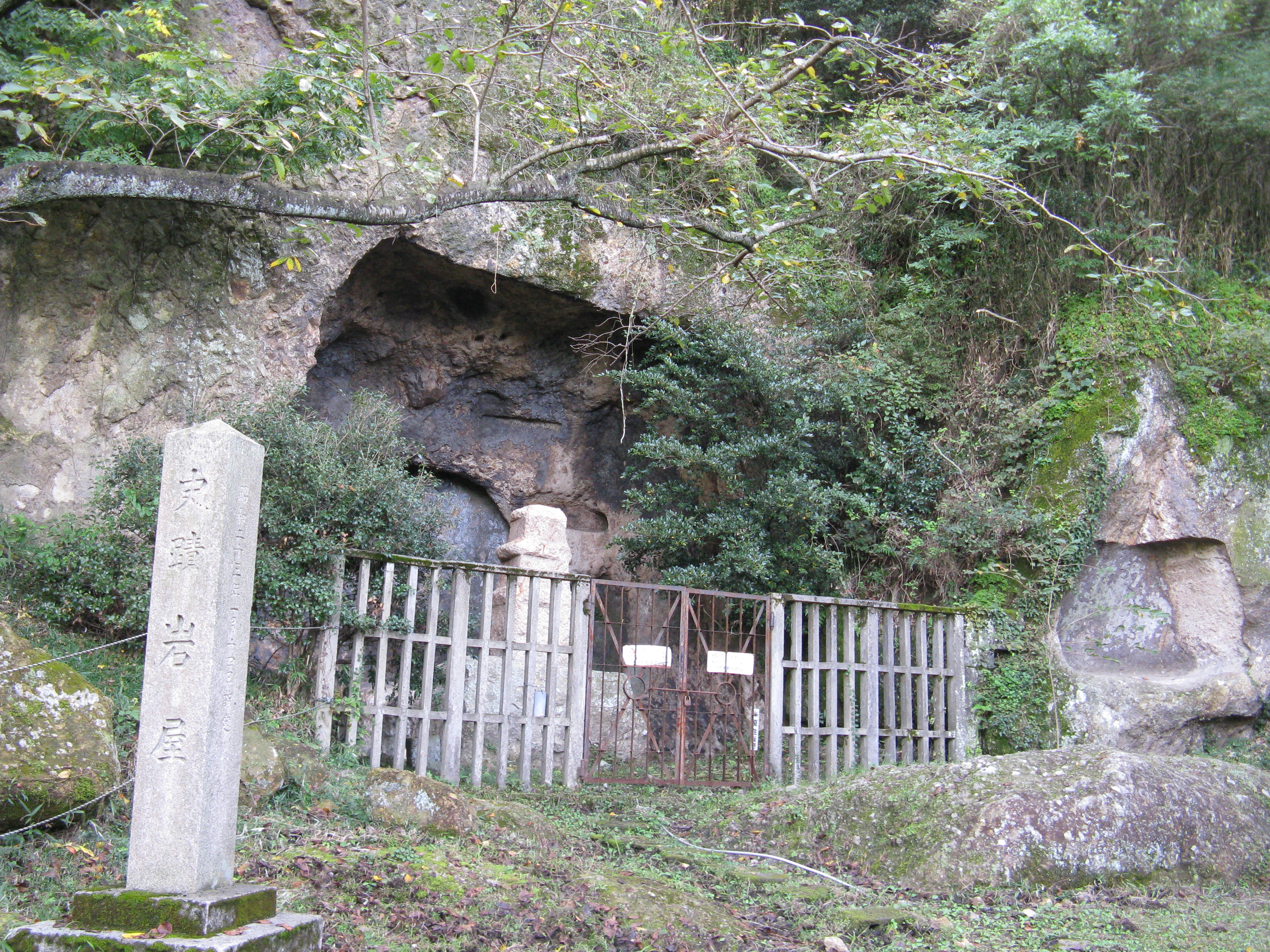
Iwaya

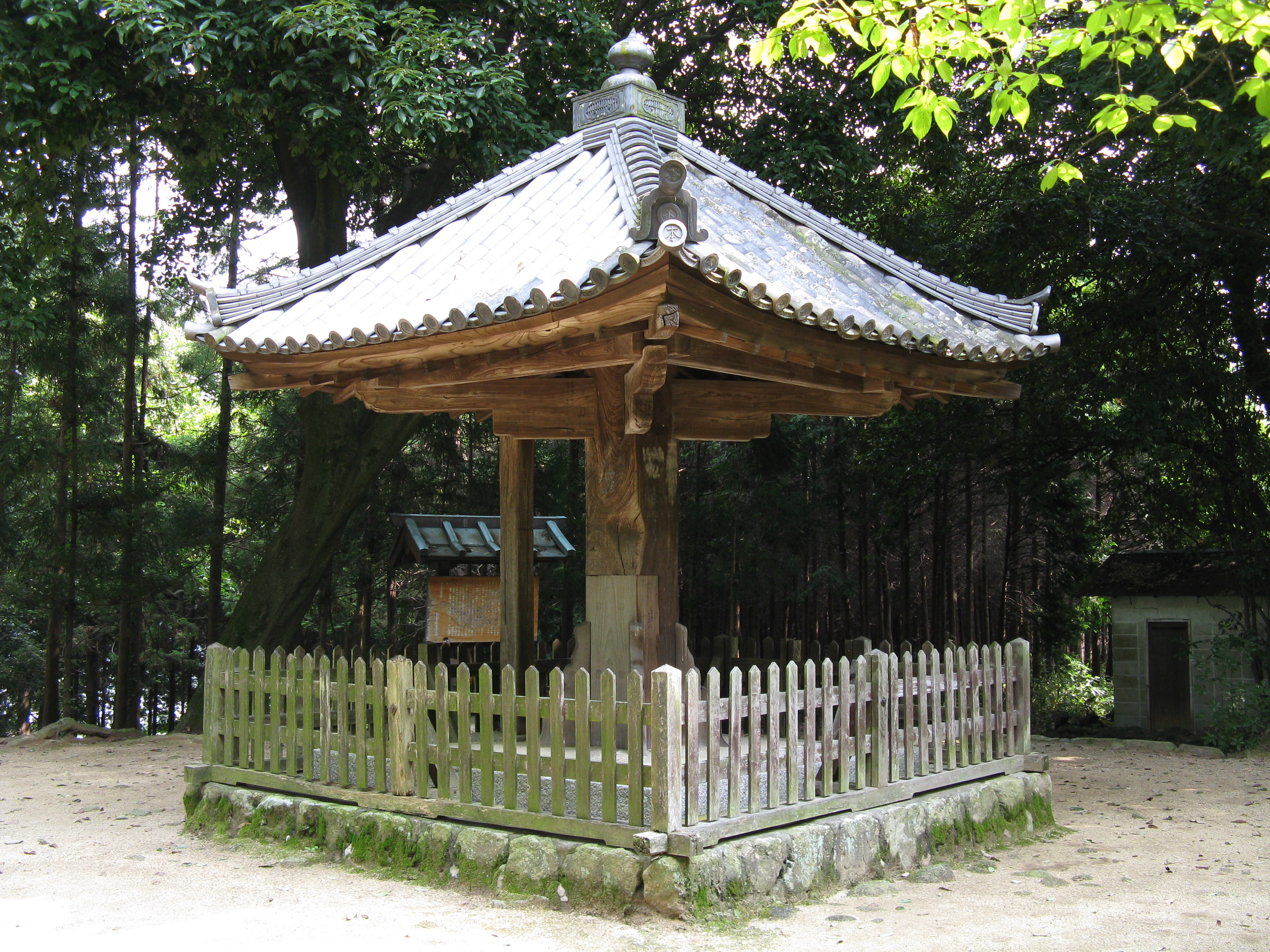
Kasadou

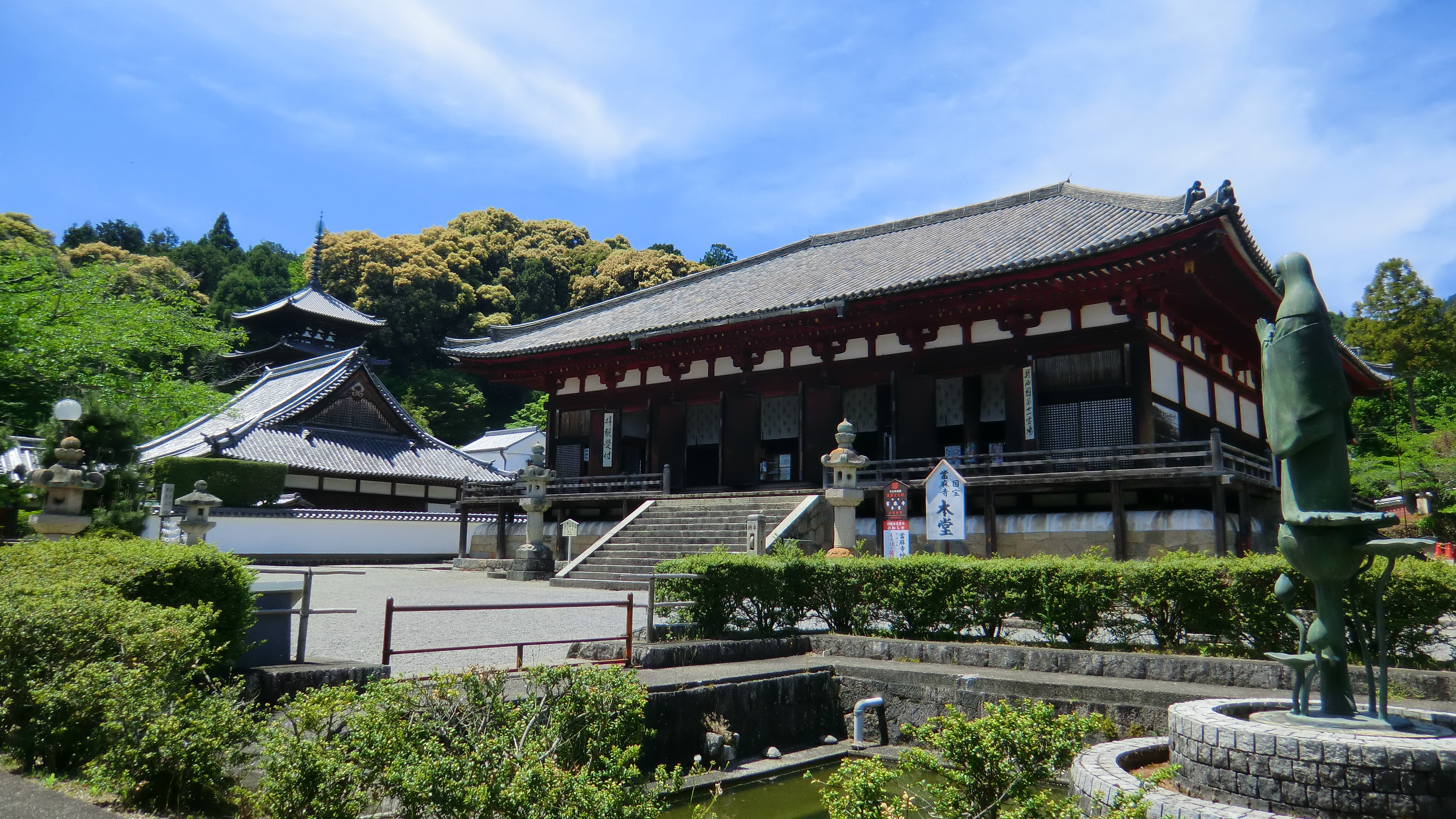
Taimadera

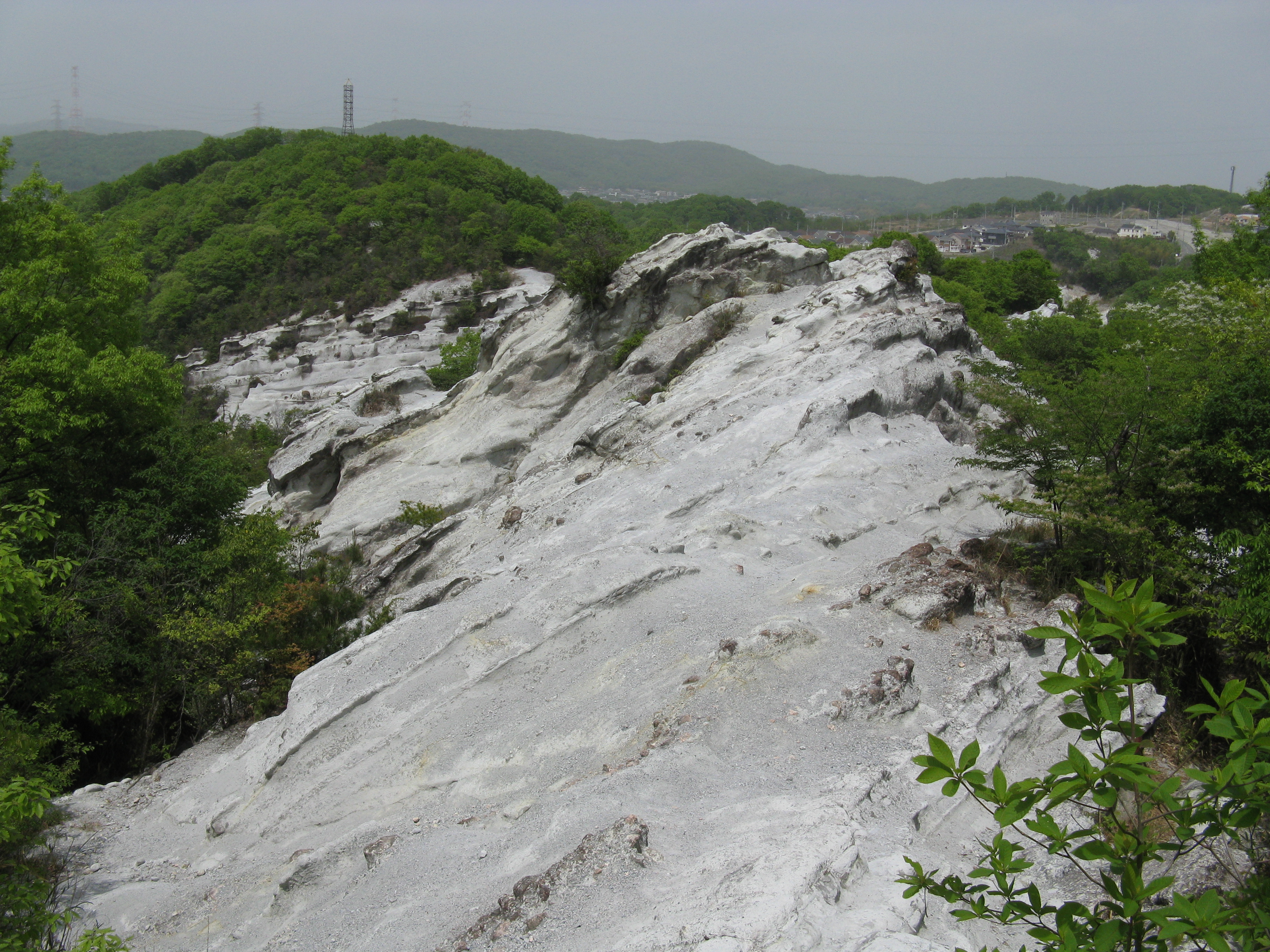
Donzurubo
