= Mount Naka Katsuragi =

Mountain in Japan

- 中葛城山; Naka Katsuragi-san
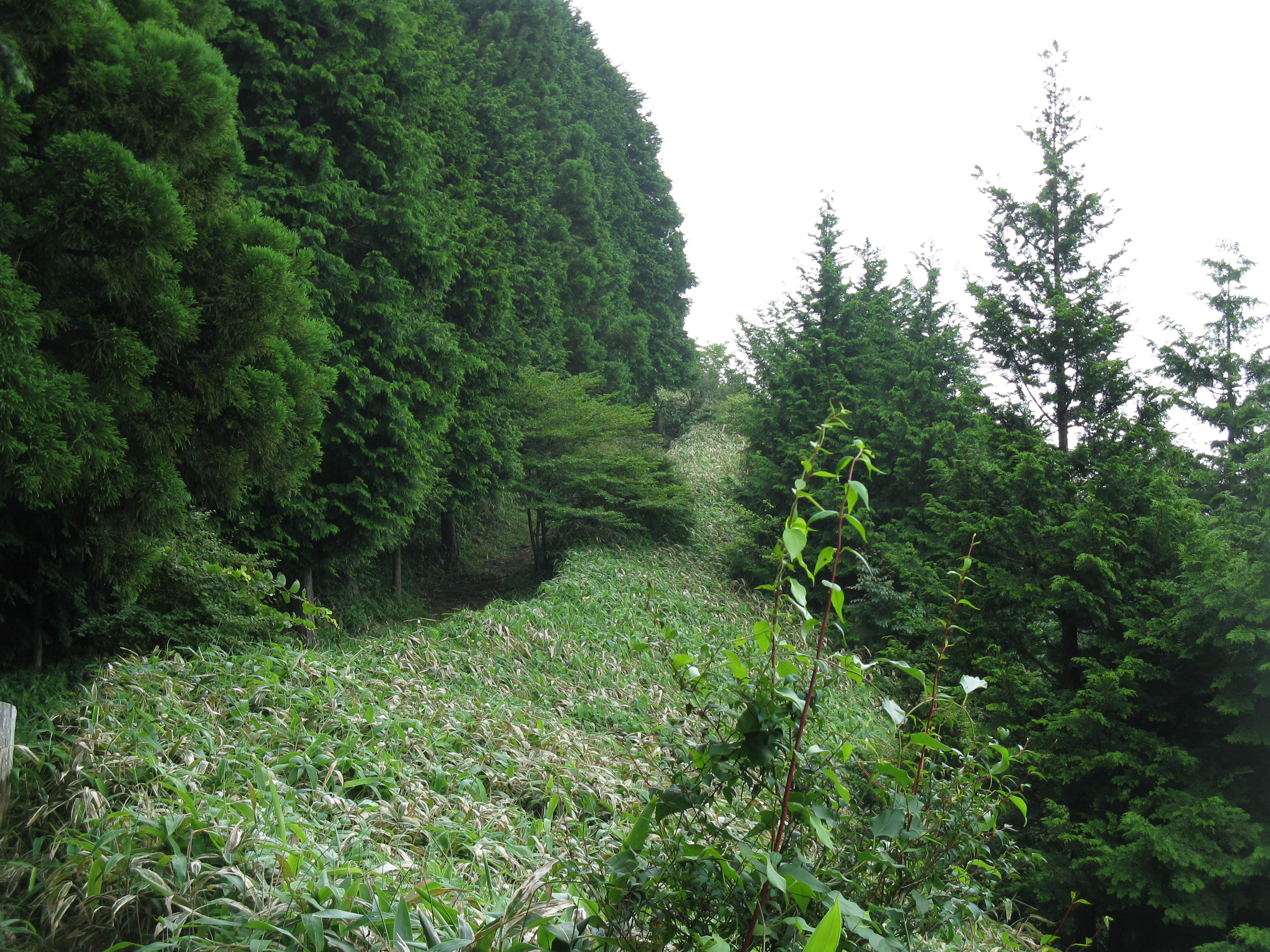
- The trail going up Mount Naka Katsuragi (July 2010).

Highest point
- Elevation: 937.7 m (3,076 ft)
- Coordinates: 34°29′36″N 135°40′45″E

Naming
- English translation: Middle Kudzu Castle Mountain
- Language of name: Japanese

Geography
- Location within Japan
- Location: Mount Naka Katsuragi is located in Chihayaakasaka, Osaka and Gojō, Nara, Japan
- Parent range: Kongō Range

Mount Naka Katsuragi (中葛城山, Naka Katsuragi-san) is a mountain in the Kongō Range to the south of Mount Kongō, rising to an elevation of 937.7 metres (3,076 ft). The mountain is situated between Chihayaakasaka, Osaka and Gojō, Nara in Japan. It is known for its trails being generally easy for most hikers, and for its stands of Japanese cedar and large fields of bamboo grass.

Despite being just off the popular Diamond Trail, most hikers bypass the mountain as they go between Mount Kongō to the north and Mount Jinpuku to the southwest. The summit is accessible via multiple routes from all sides of the mountain, and most hikes take about 90 minutes.

== Location ==
Mount Naka Katsuragi is a 937.7 metres (3,076 ft) (though the Geospatial Information Authority of Japan shows 937.6 meters, most other sources show 937.7) mountain located within Kongō-Ikoma-Kisen Quasi-National Park, about 3 kilometres (1.9 mi) almost directly south of Mount Kongō. Despite being very close to Mount Kongō, and being on the Diamond Trail, there are fewer serious mountain climbers.

=== Environs ===
On the Osaka side, extensive reforestation efforts of Japanese cedar and bamboo grass (Sasa veitchii) have taken place, but they have produced mixed results.

On the approach to the summit on the Gojō side, various shrubs and large fields of Sasa veitchii grow everywhere due to the lack of tall trees blocking out the sunlight. In the middle of all the sasa fields is a class 3 triangulation station (the name of the station is Kitayama (北山)).

== Access and amenities ==
The trails on the mountain generally rise in elevation fairly slowly, so the mountain is popular with recreational hikers. About 100 metres (330 ft) northeast of Mount Naka Katsuragi on the Diamond Trail is Kuruno Pass (久留野峠, Kuruno Tōge) (elevation 890 metres (2,920 ft)), and while the vertical distance is only about 60 metres (200 ft), the ascent is extremely steep and a difficult climb for those with little mountaineering experience.

The peak is just off the Diamond Trail, a 50 kilometres (31 mi) hiking trail centered on Mount Kongō. Even though it has many hikers traversing by its peak, most bypass Mount Naka Katsuragi on the way to Mount Jinpuku and Kimi Pass (紀見峠, Kimi Tōge) after ascending to the base of Mount Kongō via the Mount Kongo Ropeway.

There are two routes from Gojō, each taking about 90 minutes: one via Kuruno Pass from Owa-chō (小和町), and a route from Kuruno-chō (久留野町) which is shorter in distance but rises more steeply.

Cell service is available at the summit. The closest toilet facilities are north on the Diamond Trail about 35 minutes, halfway to Mount Kongō at Fukumi Pass (伏見峠, Fukumi Tōge).

== Gallery ==
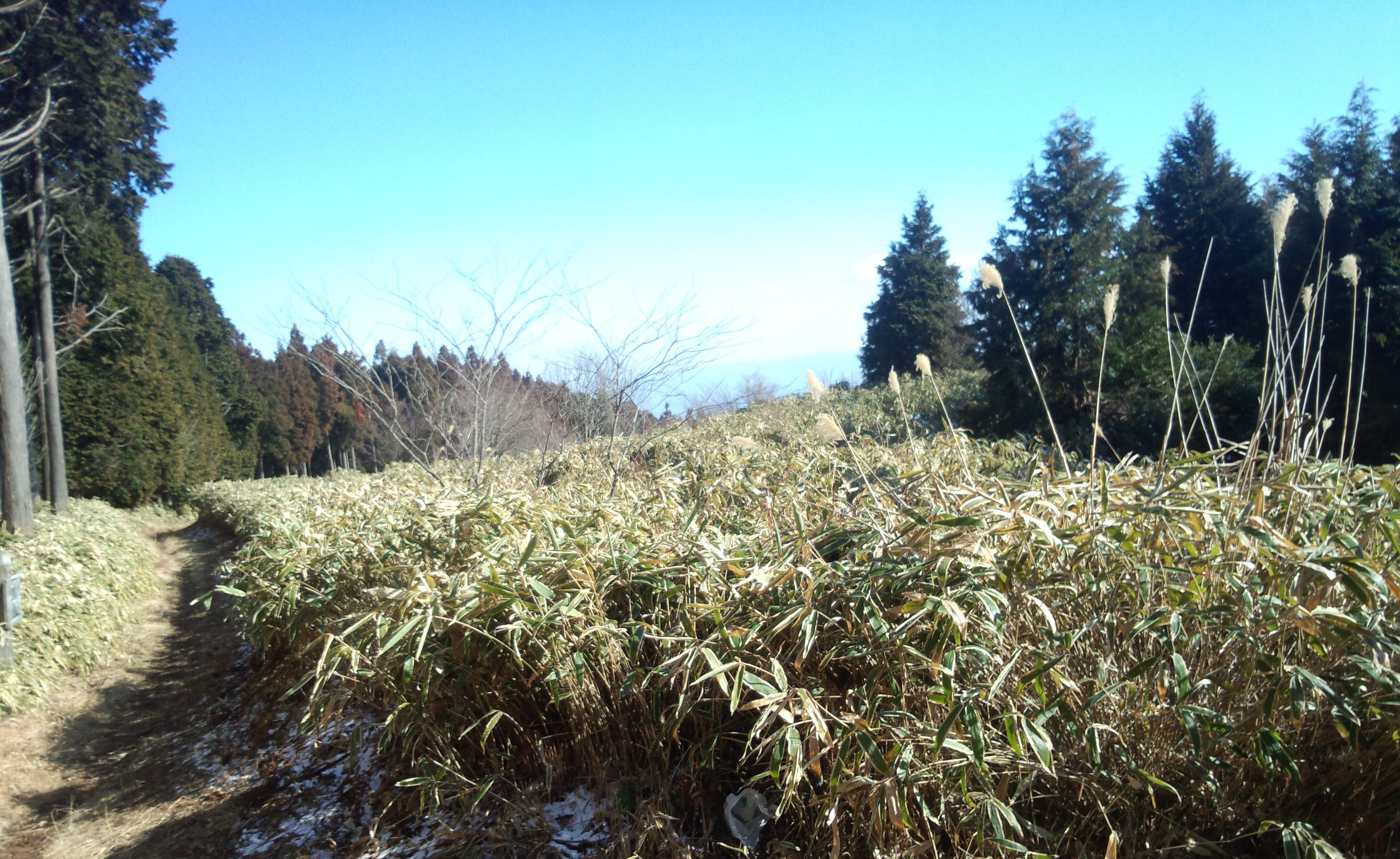
A trail through a field of bamboo grass near the summit of Mount Naka Katsuragi.

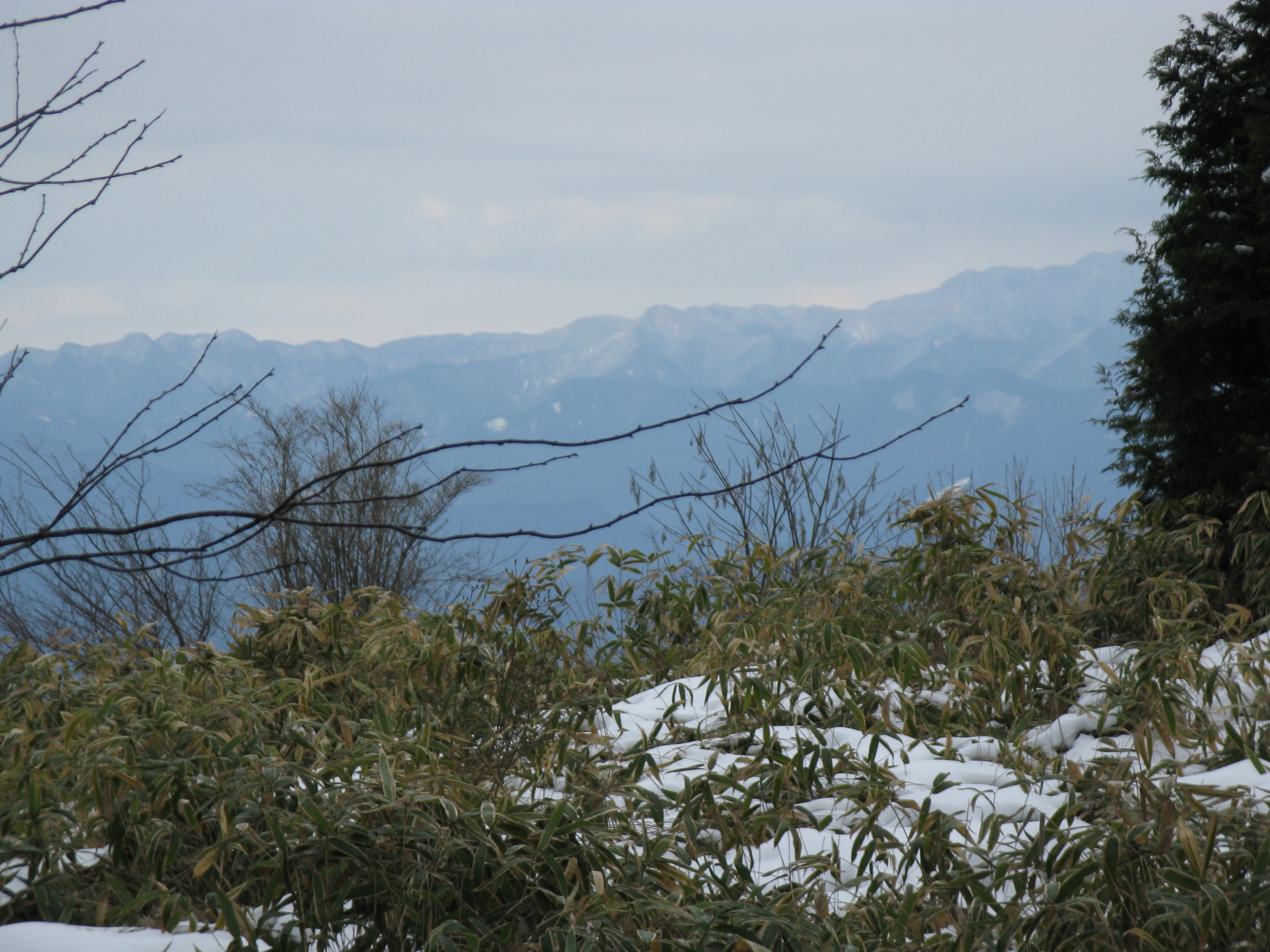
View from partway up the mountain.

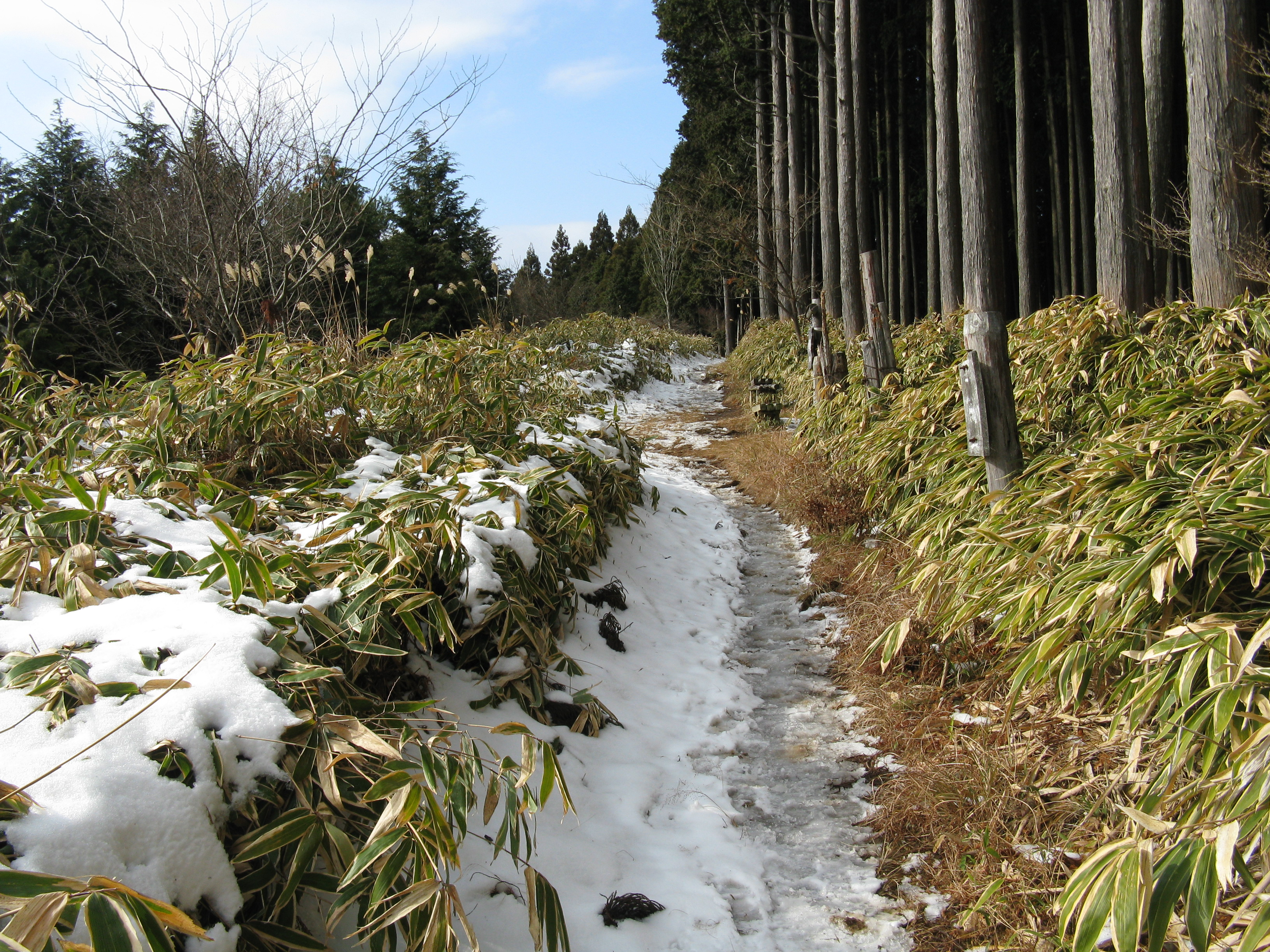
A bamboo grass trail in winter.

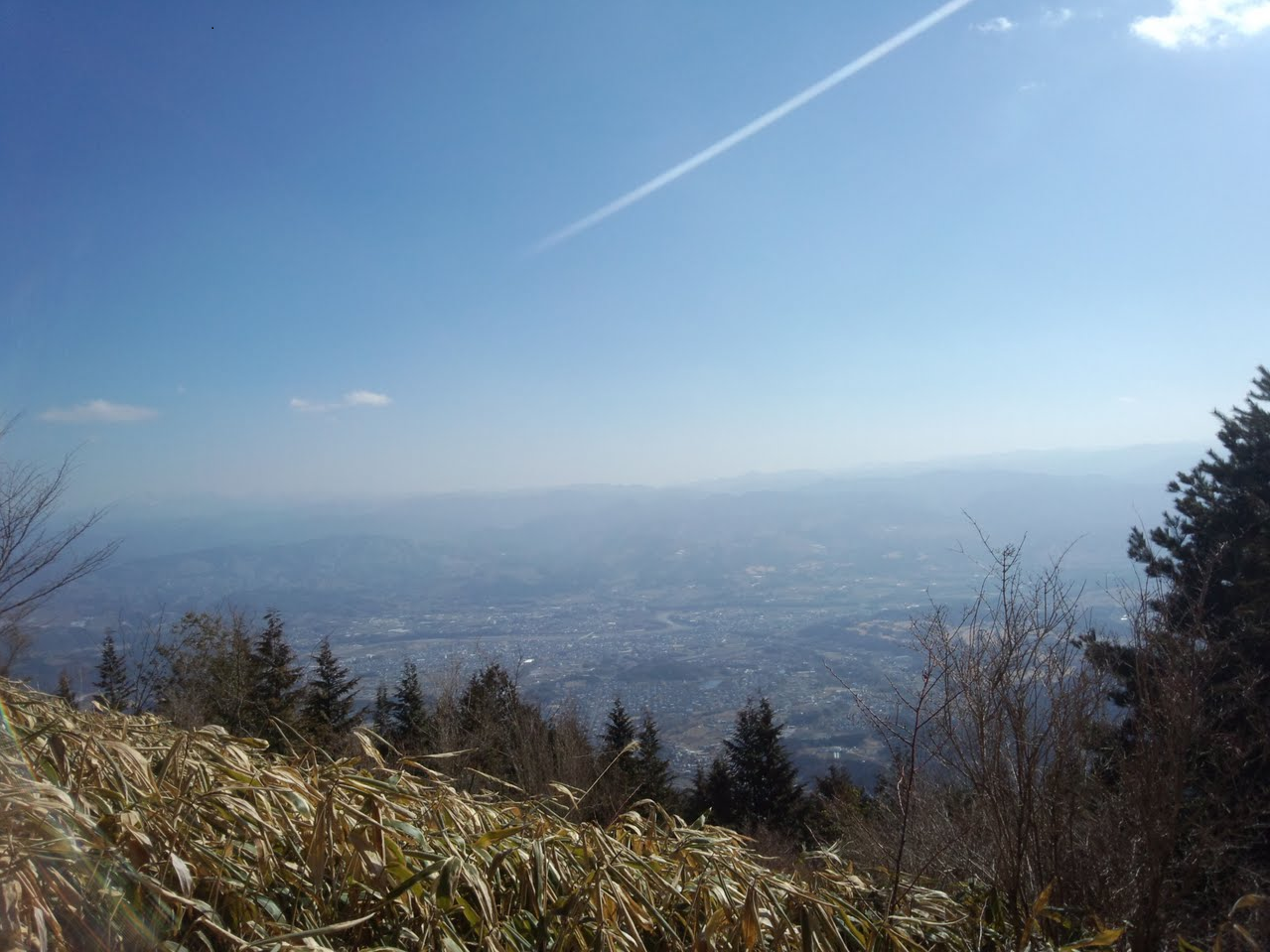
A scenic view from the summit toward Gojō in 2000.

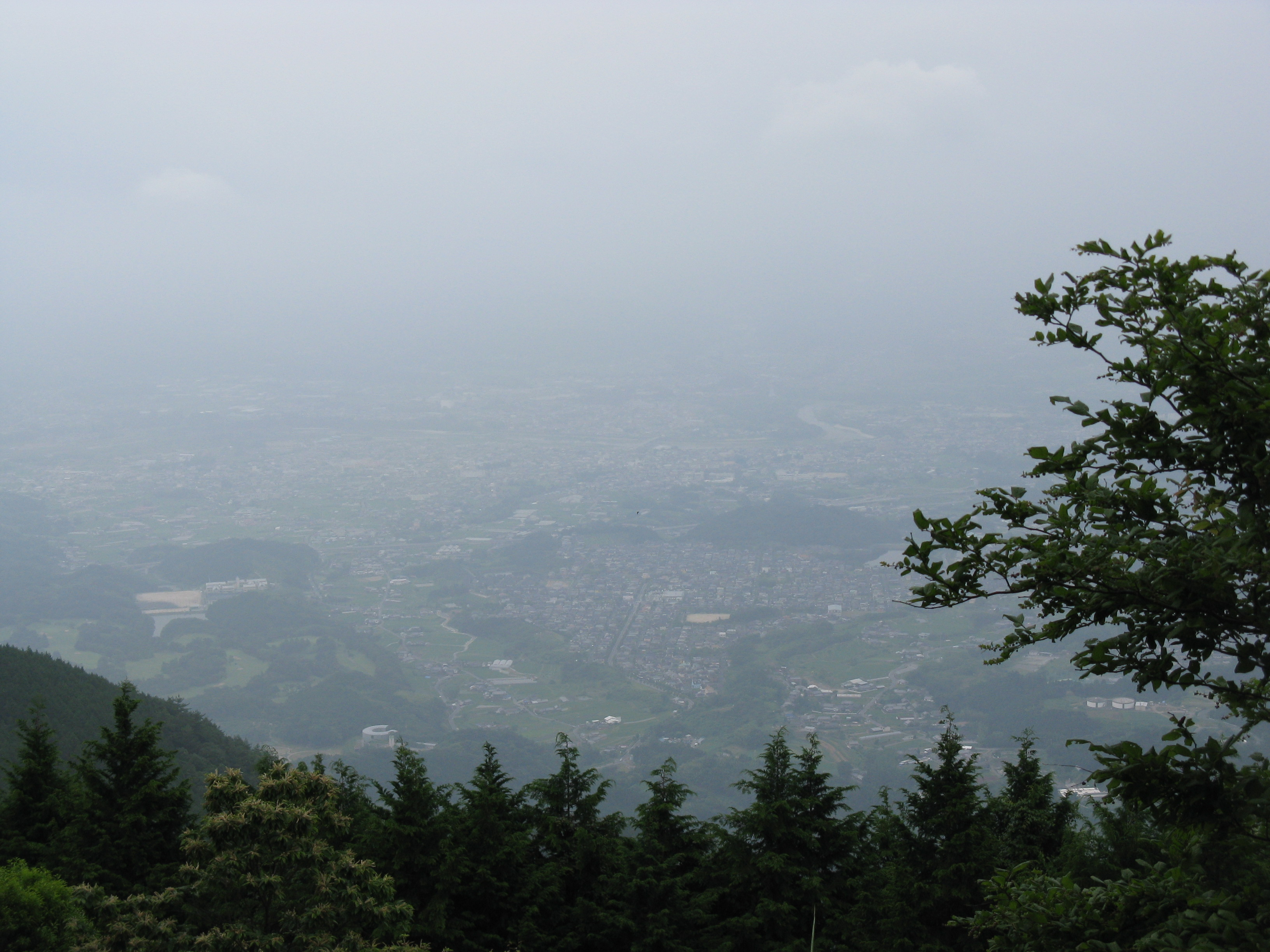
Another scenic view of Gojō from 2010.

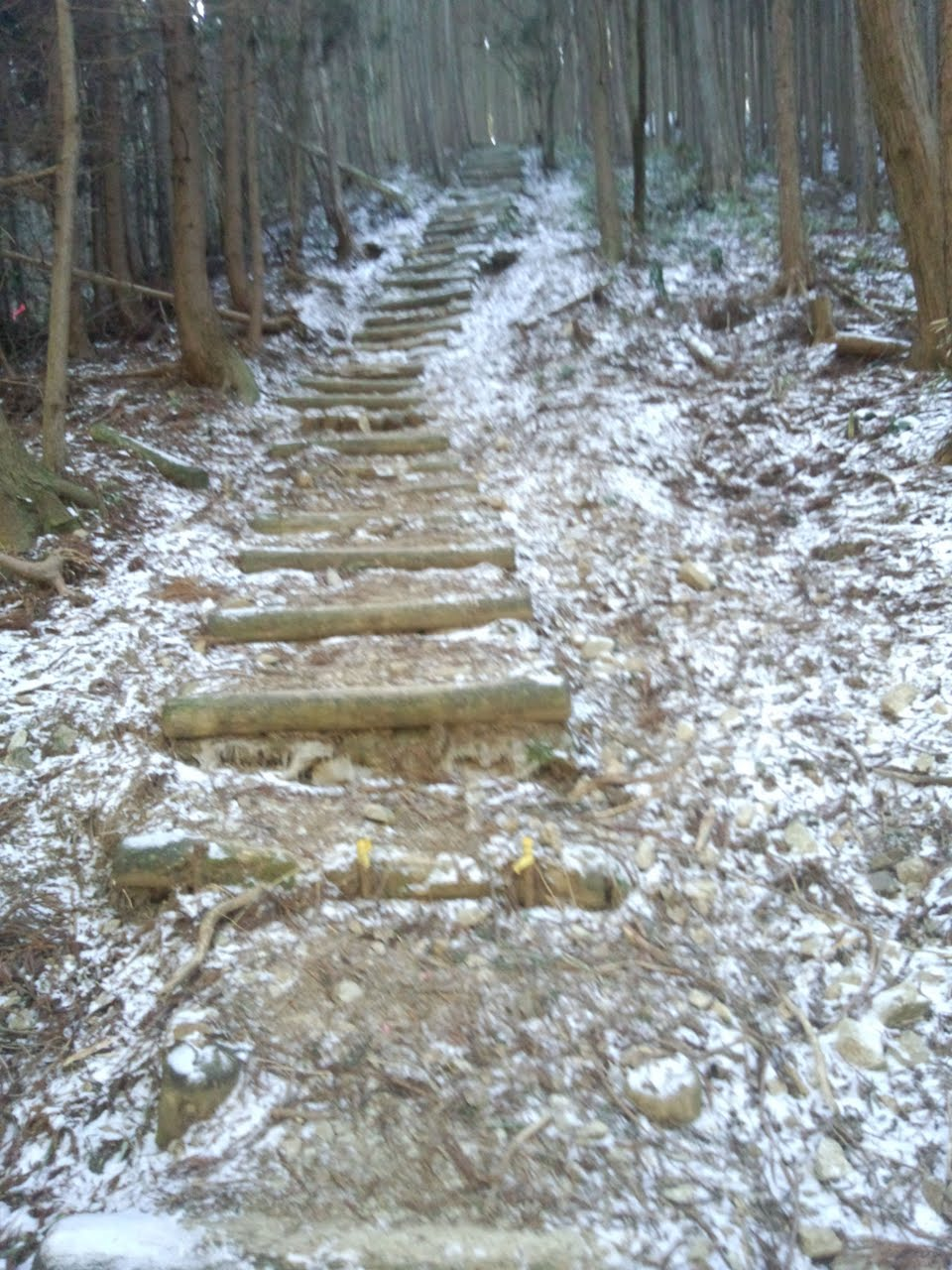
Steep stairway leading from Kuruno Pass up the mountain.

== See also ==
- Mount Izumi Katsuragi
- Mount Minami Katsuragi
- Mount Yamato Katsuragi
