= Mount Minami Katsuragi =

Mountain in Japan

- 南葛城山; Minami Katsuragi-san
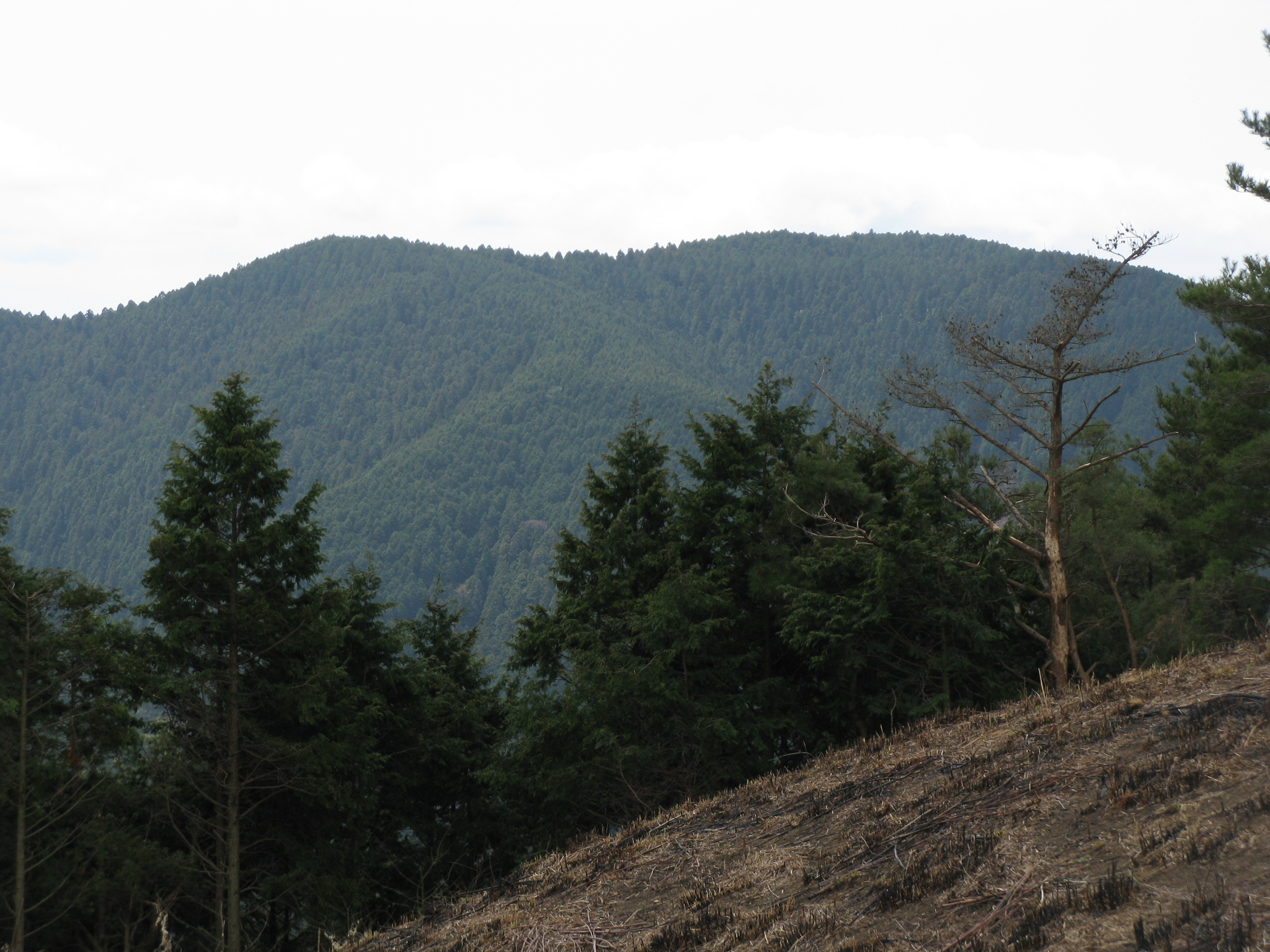
- Mount Minami Katsuragi as seen from the slope of Mount Iwawaki (April 2010).

Highest point
- Elevation: 922 m (3,025 ft)
- Coordinates: 34°21′25″N 135°32′19″E

Naming
- English translation: South Kudzu Castle Mountain
- Language of name: Japanese

Geography
- Location within Japan
- Location: Mount Minami Katsuragi is located between Kawachinagano, Osaka and Hashimoto, Wakayama, Japan
- Parent range: Kongō Range

Mount Minami Katsuragi (南葛城山, Minami Katsuragi-san) is the tallest mountain in the Izumi Mountains within the Kongō Range, straddling the border between Osaka and Wakayama Prefectures in Japan. Its peak elevation is 922 metres (3,025 ft).

== Location and naming ==
Mount Minami Katsuragi is a remote mountain located on the prefectural border between Kawachinagano, Osaka and Hashimoto, Wakayama, Japan. With a peak elevation of 922 metres (3,025 ft), it is the highest peak in the Izumi Mountains, a group of mountains part of the larger Kongō Range. It is one of the mountains listed as one of the Osaka 50 Mountains, and is the highest peak in Wakayama Prefecture.

=== Environs ===
There are not a lot of extreme mountain climbers ascending this peak, so Mount Minami Katsuragi is generally quiet, with few climbers. The sides of the mountain are covered in Japanese cedar and Sasa veitchii, or bamboo grass.

== Access and amenities ==
The summit has a number of benches and chairs from which to view the scenery, including stands of Japanese cedar which surround the overlook.

There are a number of trails leading up the mountain. The most common routes are listed below:

- The first starts northwest of the mountain at Takihata Dam, follows the Diamond Trail east to the Mount Iwawaki trailhead, follows the Sengoku Valley Forest Road (千石谷林道, Sengokudani Rindō) to the Forest Trail Fork (林間歩道分岐, rinkan hodō bunki). This leads to the Nozoki Flats (ノゾキ平), from where you can go up to the summit.
- Starting to the east at Kimi Pass (紀見峠, Kimi Tōge), go west on the Diamond Trail to the Mount Minami Katsuragi Fork (南葛城山分岐, Minami Katsuragi-san Bunki), which will take you up to the top.
- Within Iwawaki Forest (岩湧の森, Iwawaki no Mori) is Iwawaki Temple (岩湧寺, Iwawakiji). The trail from there leads you toward Mount Iwawaki. About 10 minutes before reaching Mount Iwawaki, turn off at East Summit (東峰, Tōmine) and follow the Mount Minami Katsuragi Fork to the summit.
- Beginning the hike at Zaō Pass (蔵王峠, Zaō Tōge), follow the signs on the trail until you reach the summit. This route is much longer than most others as it zigzags a lot while going up the mountain. This route is also the most rugged, steep, strenuous, and dangerous.

== Gallery ==
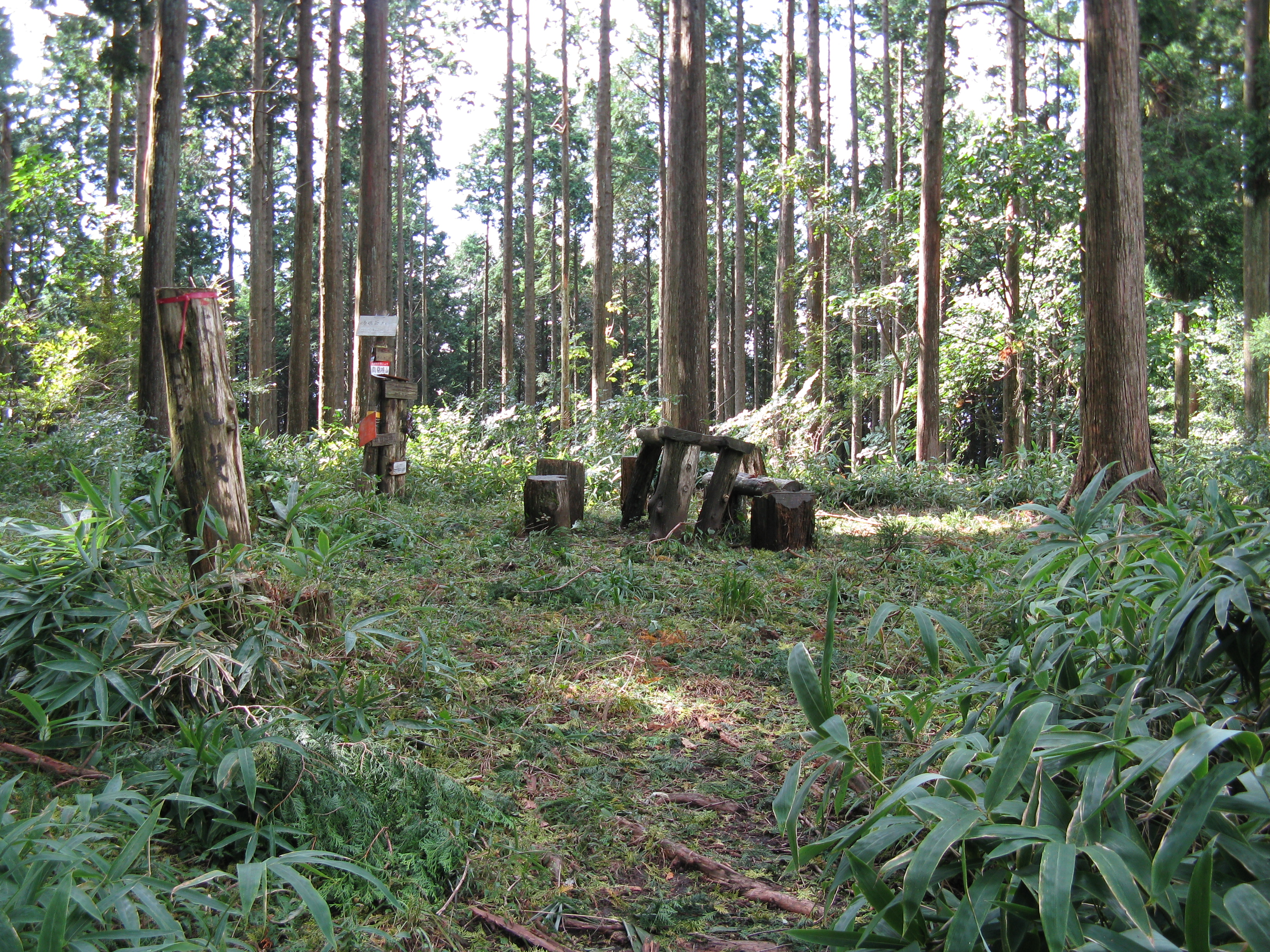
The summit of Mount Minami Katsuragi

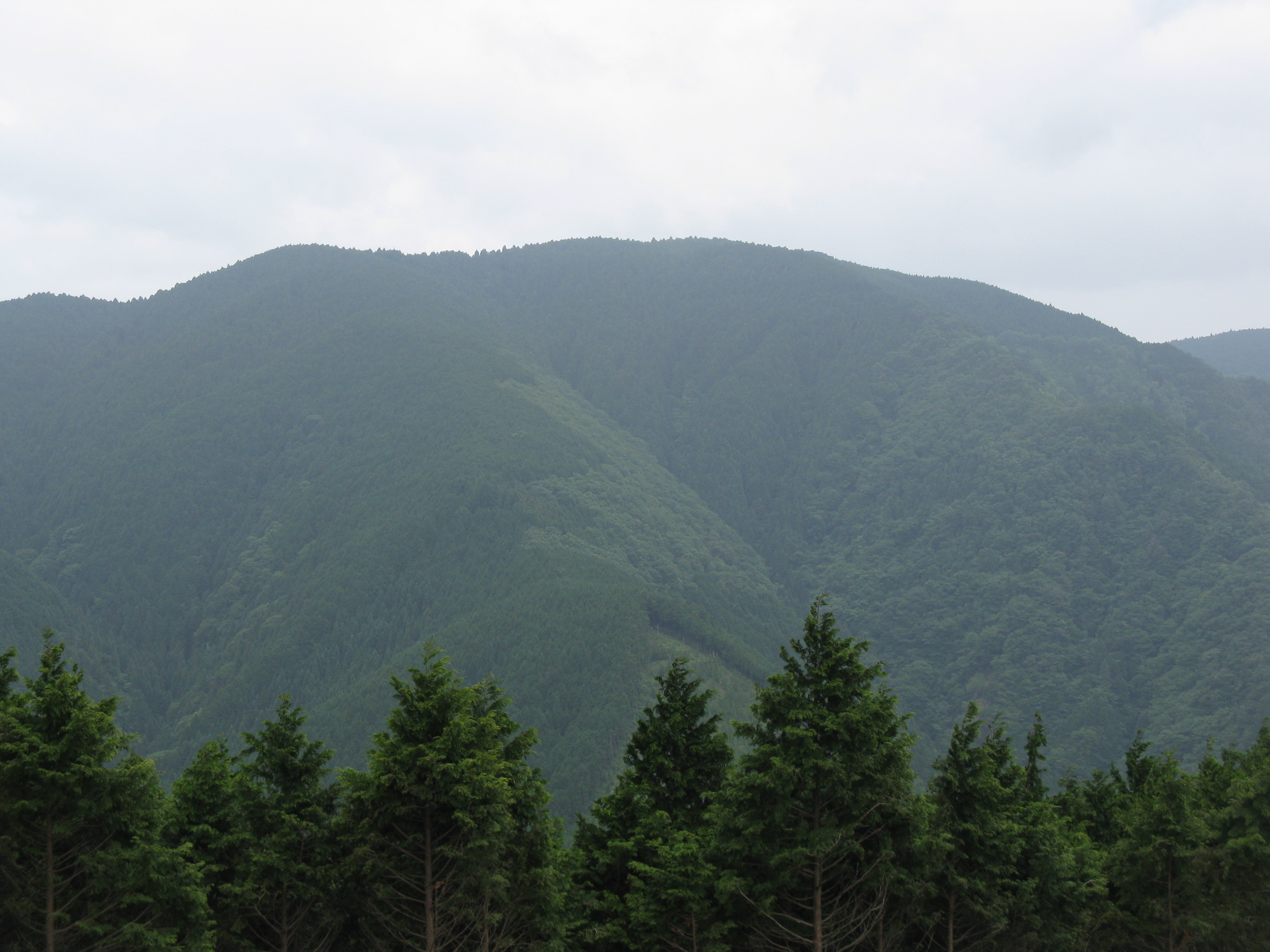
Mount Minami Katsuragi as seen from the slope of Mount Iwawaki

== See also ==
- Mount Izumi Katsuragi
- Mount Naka Katsuragi
- Mount Yamato Katsuragi
