= Katsuragi 28 Shuku =

Sutra mounds in Kansai region, Japan

The Katsuragi 28 Shuku (Japanese: 葛城二十八宿, Hepburn: Katsuragi nijūhasshuku), or the Katsuragi 28 Shuku Kyōzuka, is a series of twenty-eight sutra mounds (経塚, kyōzuka) found mainly in the Kongō Range in the Kansai region of Japan. The majority of the sutra mounds lie within the Kongō-Ikoma-Kisen Quasi-National Park. According to legend, each of the sutra mounds corresponds to a chapter of the Lotus Sutra buried by En no Gyōja, the mythical 7th-century founder of Shugendō.

== List of sutra mounds ==
Map

Below is a list of Katsuragi 28 Shuku sutra mounds.

Note that for the following table of the sutra mounds, there are two potential sites for mounds 3, 14, and 28, which are designated as 3A, 3B, 14A, 14B, 28A, and 28B, respectively.

No.	Image	Sutra mound	GSI map	Google Maps	Coordinates	Lotus Sutra chapter
1		Torajima, Tomogashima – Tomogashima Johon (友ヶ島 序品) (Note: Torajima is typically inaccessible for ordinary sightseers and can only be reached via organized pilgrimages.)	GSI map	Google Maps	34°17′34.4″N 135°1′38″E	Introduction (序品)
2		Ruins of Jinpuku-ji (Ninoshuku Kannondō) – Hobenhon (神福寺跡（二之宿観音堂）方便品)	GSI map	Google Maps	34°16′18.4″N 135°6′40.5″E	Skillful Means (方便品)
3A		Mount Daifuku – Hiyuhon (大福山 譬喩品)	GSI map	Google Maps	34°18′12.6″N 135°12′31″E	A Parable (譬喩品)
3B		Mount Unzan – Hiyuhon (雲山峰 譬喩品)	GSI map	Google Maps	34°18′06″N 135°14′06″E	A Parable (譬喩品)
4		Sakura Jizō – Shingehon (さくら地蔵 信解品)	GSI map	Google Maps	34°18′46.1″N 135°16′14.9″E	Willing Acceptance (信解品)
5		Mount Kuratani – Yakusō-yuhon (倉谷山 薬草喩品)	GSI map	Google Maps	34°18′31.7″N 135°20′33.7″E	Herbs (薬草喩品)
6		Shino-tōge Pass – Jukihon (志野峠 授記品)	GSI map	Google Maps	34°18′15.8″N 135°23′6.7″E	Prediction (授記品)
7		Nakatsugawa – Kejō-yuhon (中津川 化城喩品)	GSI map	Google Maps	34°18′50.4″N 135°23′54.2″E	The Apparitional City (化城喩品)
8		Inunaki-san Shippōryū-ji Reishogatake – Gohyakudeshi-jukihon (犬鳴山七宝瀧寺鈴杵ヶ嶽 五百弟子受記品)	GSI map	Google Maps	34°20′6.7″N 135°23′10.3″E	The 500 Disciples Receive Their Predictions (五百弟子受記品)
9		Mine no Ryū-ō – Jugaku-mugaku-ninkihon (嶺の龍王 授学無学人記品])	GSI map	Google Maps	34°20′53.1″N 135°26′4″E	The Predictions for Those Who Still Have More to Learn and for Those Who Do Not (授学無学人記品)
10		Dai-itoku-ji – Hosshihon (大威徳寺 法師品)	GSI map	Google Maps	34°22′17.4″N 135°26′55.3″E	The Expounder of the Dharma (法師品)
11		Nanakoshi-tōge Pass Kyōzuka-yama – Kenhotohon (七越峠経塚山 見宝塔品) (Note: Located on private property)	GSI map	Google Maps	34°21′12.7″N 135°28′24.1″E	The Appearance of a Jeweled Stupa (見宝塔品)
12		Goma no Tawa Hodome – Daiba-dattahon (護摩のたわ朴留 堤婆達多品)	GSI map	Google Maps	34°20′55.68″N 135°30′8.8″E	Devadatta (堤婆品)
13		Mukai Tawa – Kanjihon (向い多和 勧持品)	GSI map	Google Maps	34°20′13.56″N 135°30′11.9″E	Perseverance (勧持品)
14A		Kōtaki-ji Temple Buttokutawa – Anrakugyōhon (光瀧寺仏徳多和 安楽行品)	GSI map	Google Maps	34°22′10.92″N 135°31′4.4″E	Ease in Practice (安楽行品)
14B		Mount Minami-Katsuragi Kagami no Shuku – Anrakugyōhon (南葛城山鏡宿 安楽行品), at Ipponsugi Buttoku Tawa (一本杉 仏徳多和)	GSI map	Google Maps	34°21′27″N 135°32′25.5″E	Ease in Practice (安楽行品)
15		Mount Iwawaki – Jūjiyū-juppon (岩湧山 従地湧出品)	GSI map	Google Maps	34°22′54.62″N 135°33′19″E	Bodhisattvas Emerging from the Earth (従地湧出品)
16		Nagaredani Kongōdō-ji – Nyorai-juryōbon (流谷金剛童子 如来寿量品)	GSI map	Google Maps	34°23′37.18″N 135°34′53.6″E	The Lifespan of the Tathāgata (如来寿量品)
17		Amami Fudō – Funbetsu-kudokuhon (天見不動 分別功徳品)	GSI map	Google Maps	34°22′31.08″N 135°35′22.9″E	Description of Merits (分別功徳品)
18		Iwaze Kyōzuka-yama – Zuiki-kudokuhon (岩瀬経塚山 随喜功徳品) / Sainokami Valley (賽ノ神谷)	GSI map	Google Maps	34°24′6.34″N 135°37′4.37″E	The Merits of Joyful Acceptance (随喜功徳品)
19		Jinpuku-yama – Hosshi-kudokuhon (神福山 法師功徳品)	GSI map	Google Maps	34°23′19.32″N 135°39′30.13″E	The Benefits Obtained by an Expounder of the Dharma (法師功徳品)
20		Ruins of Ishi-dera – Jōfukyō Bosatsuhon (石寺跡 常不軽菩薩品)	GSI map	Google Maps	34°24′16.31″N 135°41′9.4″E	Bodhisattva Sadāparibhūta (常不軽菩薩品)
21		Kongō-san – Nyorai-jinrikihon (金剛山 如来神力品)	GSI map	Google Maps	34°25′2.21″N 135°40′39″E	The Transcendent Powers of the Tathāgata (如来神力品)
22		Mizukoshi-tawa – Zokuruihon (水越多和 嘱累品)	GSI map	Google Maps	34°26′10.32″N 135°41′45.6″E	Entrustment (嘱累品)
23		Kushira – Yakuō Bosatsu Honjihon (倶尸羅 薬王菩薩本事品)	GSI map	Google Maps	34°27′46.22″N 135°42′44″E	Ancient Accounts of Bodhisattva Bhaiṣajyarāja (薬王菩薩本事品)
24		Hiraishi-tōge Pass – Myō-on Bosatsuhon (平石峠 妙音菩薩品)	GSI map	Google Maps	34°30′8.28″N 135°40′23.88″E	Bodhisattva Gadgadasvara (妙音菩薩品)
25		Kōki-ji Temple Kōgebata – Kanzeon Bosatsu Fumonhon (高貴寺香華畑 観世音菩薩普門品)	GSI map	Google Maps	34°29′57.84″N 135°39′52.2″E	The Gateway to Every Direction (Manifested by Bodhisattva Avalokiteśvara) (観世音菩薩普門品)
26		Mount Nijō – Daranihon (二上山 陀羅尼品])	GSI map	Google Maps	34°31′32.52″N 135°40′41.16″E	Dhāraṇī (陀羅尼品)
27		Ōsaka – Myōshōgon-nō-honjihon (逢坂 妙荘厳王本事品) (Note: Located on private property)	GSI map	Google Maps	34°32′51.14″N 135°41′31″E	Ancient Accounts of King Śubhavyūha (妙荘厳王本事品)
28A		Kameno-o-shuku – Fugen Bosatsu Kanbotsuhon (亀の尾宿 普賢菩薩勧発品)	GSI map	Google Maps	34°34′47.64″N 135°40′28.2″E	Encouragement of Bodhisattva Samantabhadra (普賢菩薩勧発品)
28B		Mount Myōjin – Fugen Bosatsu Kanbotsuhon (明神山 普賢菩薩勧発品)	GSI map	Google Maps	34°34′26″N 135°40′33″E	Encouragement of Bodhisattva Samantabhadra (普賢菩薩勧発品)

== Pilgrimage groups ==
The following temples and shugendō organizations regularly organize pilgrimages to the Katsuragi 28 Shuku sutra mounds. They regularly leave behind wooden pilgrimage tablets (碑伝, hiden) containing the organization's name and month and year of visit.

- Mii-dera (三井寺) in Otsu, Shiga
- Seiganto-ji (青岸渡寺) in Wakayama Prefecture
- Tenporin-ji (転法輪寺) on Mount Kongō in Gose, Nara
- Tekkazan Dōjō (鉄火山道場) (known in full as Katsuragi Shugen Tekkazan Dōjō 葛城修験鉄火山道場) in Izumisano, Osaka Prefecture

== See also ==
- Shikoku Pilgrimage, 88-temple pilgrimage in Shikoku
- Chūgoku 33 Kannon, pilgrimage in the Chūgoku region
- Japan 100 Kannon Pilgrimage
- Twenty-Eight Mansions
