= Kongō Range =

Mountain range between Osaka and Nara Prefectures, Japan

- 金剛山地; Kongō Sanchi
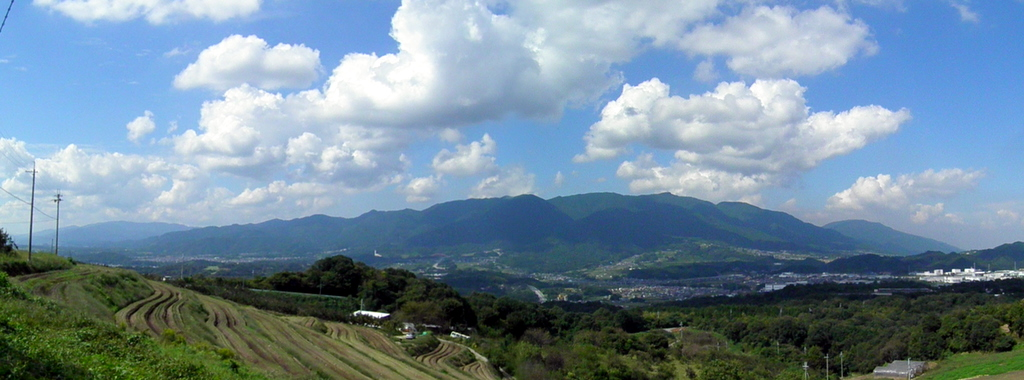
- View of the Kongō Range as seen from Gojō, Nara. The Izumi Range can be seen on the left in the back.

Highest point
- Peak: Mount Kongō, Chihayaakasaka, Osaka; Gose, Nara
- Elevation: 1,125 m (3,691 ft)
- Coordinates: 34°25′10″N 135°40′23″E

Dimensions
- Length: 24 km (15 mi)
- Width: 5 km (3.1 mi)

Geography
- Location within Japan
- Country: Japan
- Prefectures: Nara, Osaka and Wakayama
- Range coordinates: 34°25′9″N 135°40′21″E
- Biome: Nemoral

The Kongō Range (金剛山地, Kongō Sanchi) is a mountain range on the borders of Nara and Osaka Prefectures on the island of Honshū in the southwest of central Japan. The range separates the Osaka Plain and the Nara Basin, and forms a natural place for the boundary between the prefectures. The primary mountain in the range is Mount Kongō, and is contained within the Kongō-Ikoma-Kisen Quasi-National Park.

The sutra mounds of the Katsuragi 28 Shuku are scattered throughout the Kongō Range.

== Geography ==
The Kongō Range is about 24 kilometres (15 mi) long, from the Yamato River in the north to the Kino River in the south. East to West, it averages about 5 kilometres (3.1 mi) wide. The mountains in the range are from 273.6 metres (898 ft) to 1,125 metres (3,691 ft) in elevation. At Chihaya Pass, the ridgeline turns west and the Izumi Mountains begin at that point. They stretch along the border between Osaka and Wakayama Prefectures.

=== Mountains in the range ===
Listed in order of elevation.

- Mount Kongō, 1,125 metres (3,691 ft)
- Mount Yamato Katsuragi, 959.2 metres (3,147 ft)
- Iwahashi Mountain, 658.8 metres (2,161 ft)
- Mount Nijō has two peaks:
  - Odake, 517.2 metres (1,697 ft)
  - Medake, 474.2 metres (1,556 ft)
- Myōjin Mountain, 273.6 metres (898 ft)

== Gallery ==
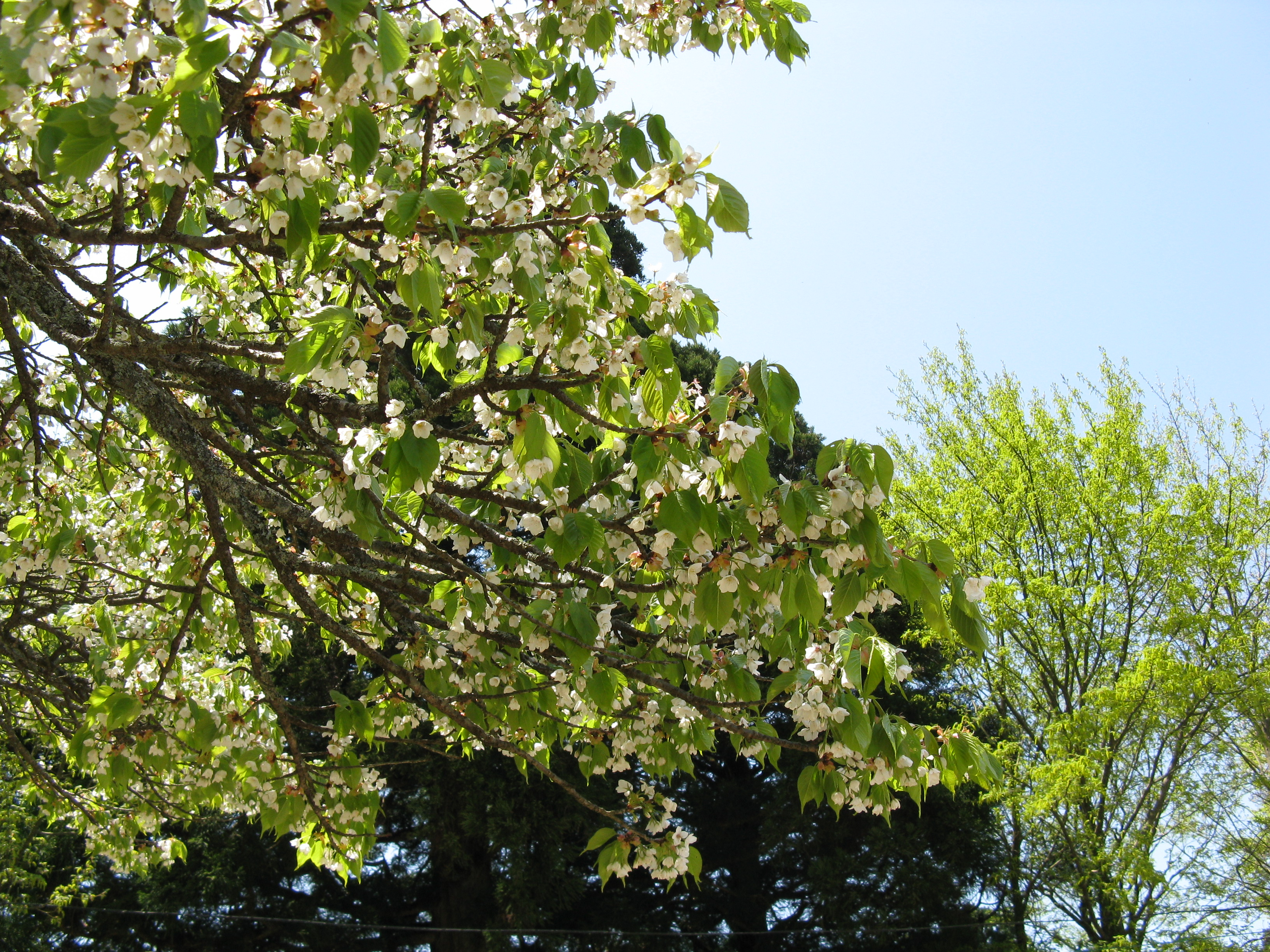
Kongō cherry blossoms in spring

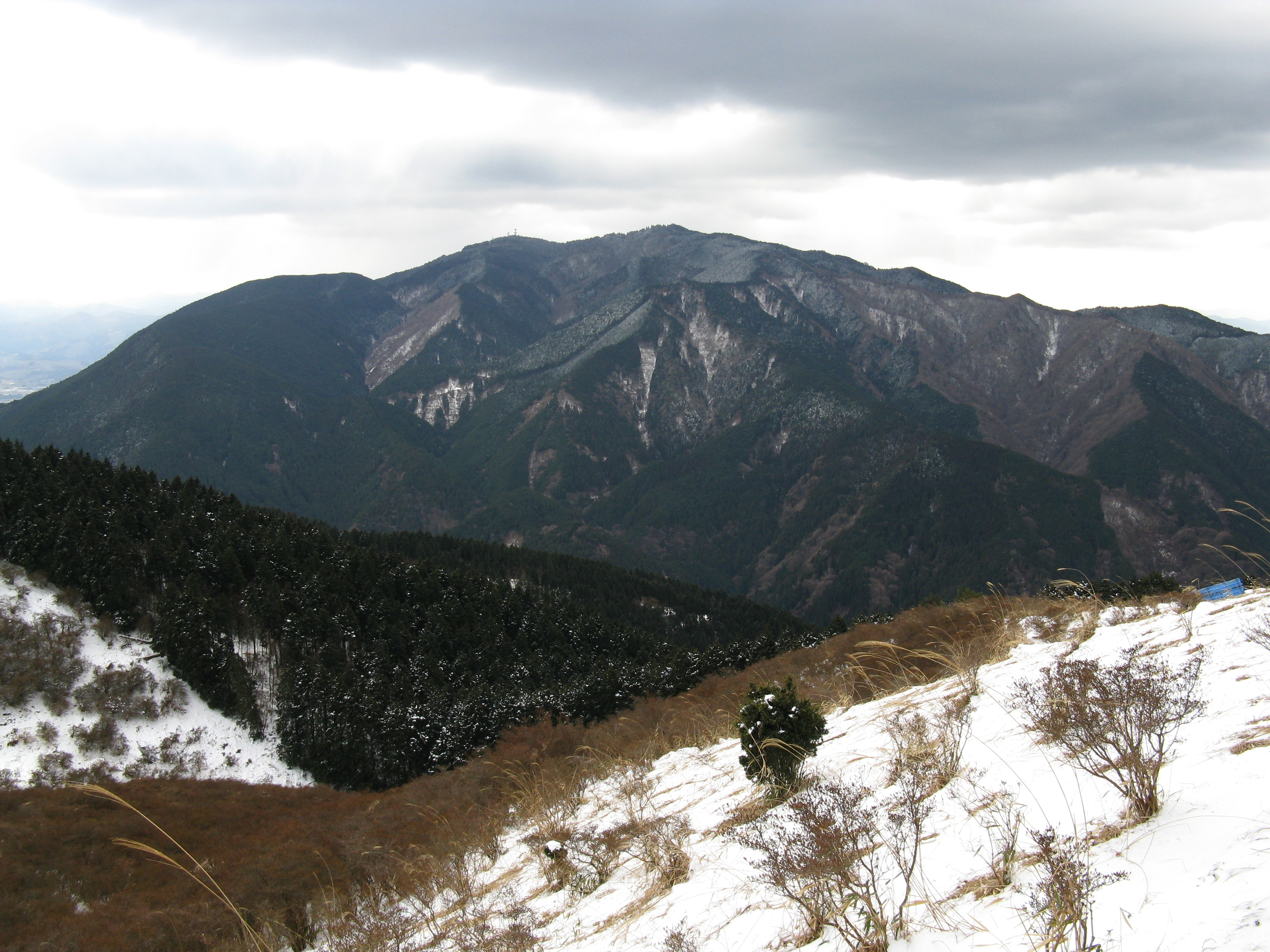
Mount Kongō

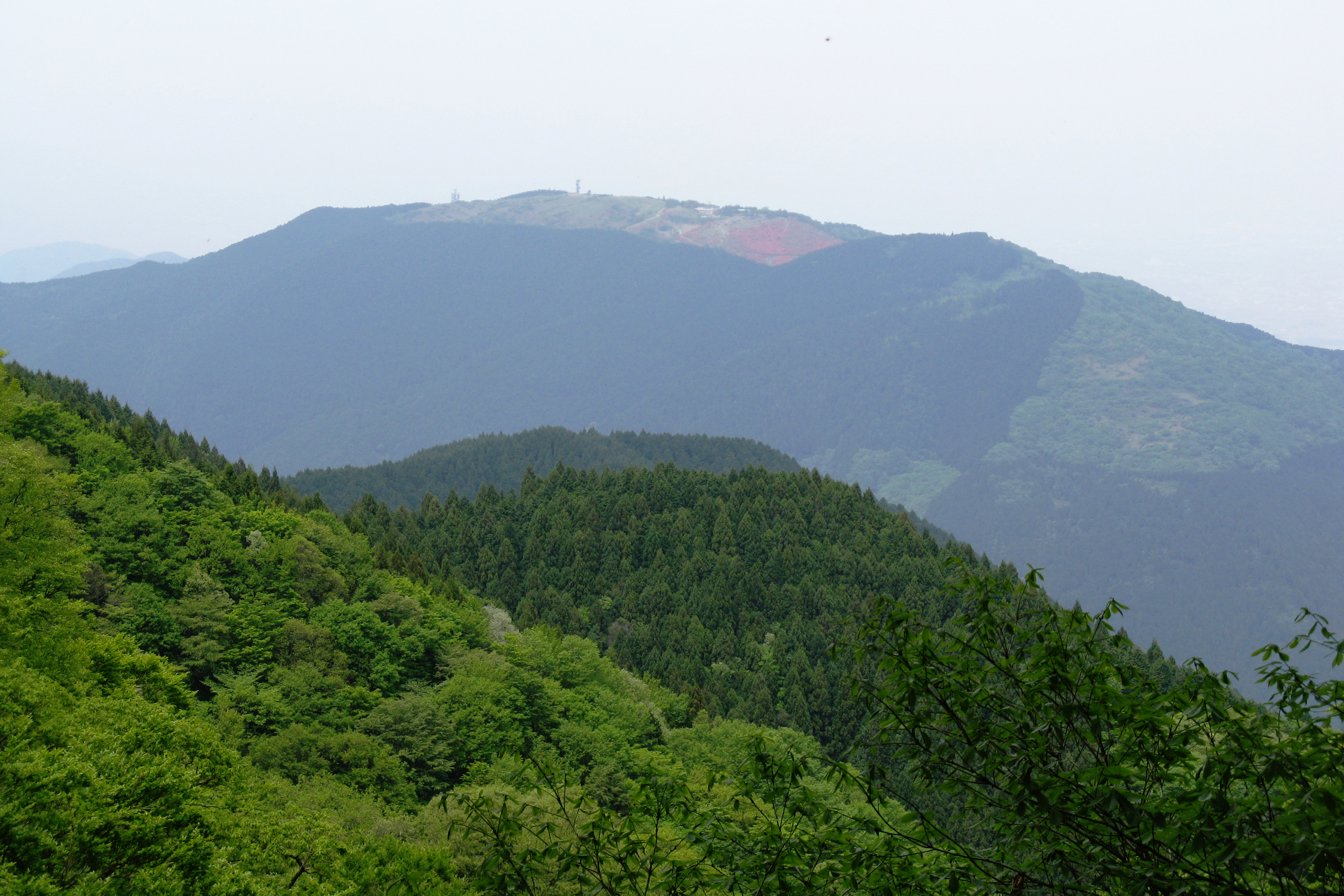
Mount Yamato Katsuragi

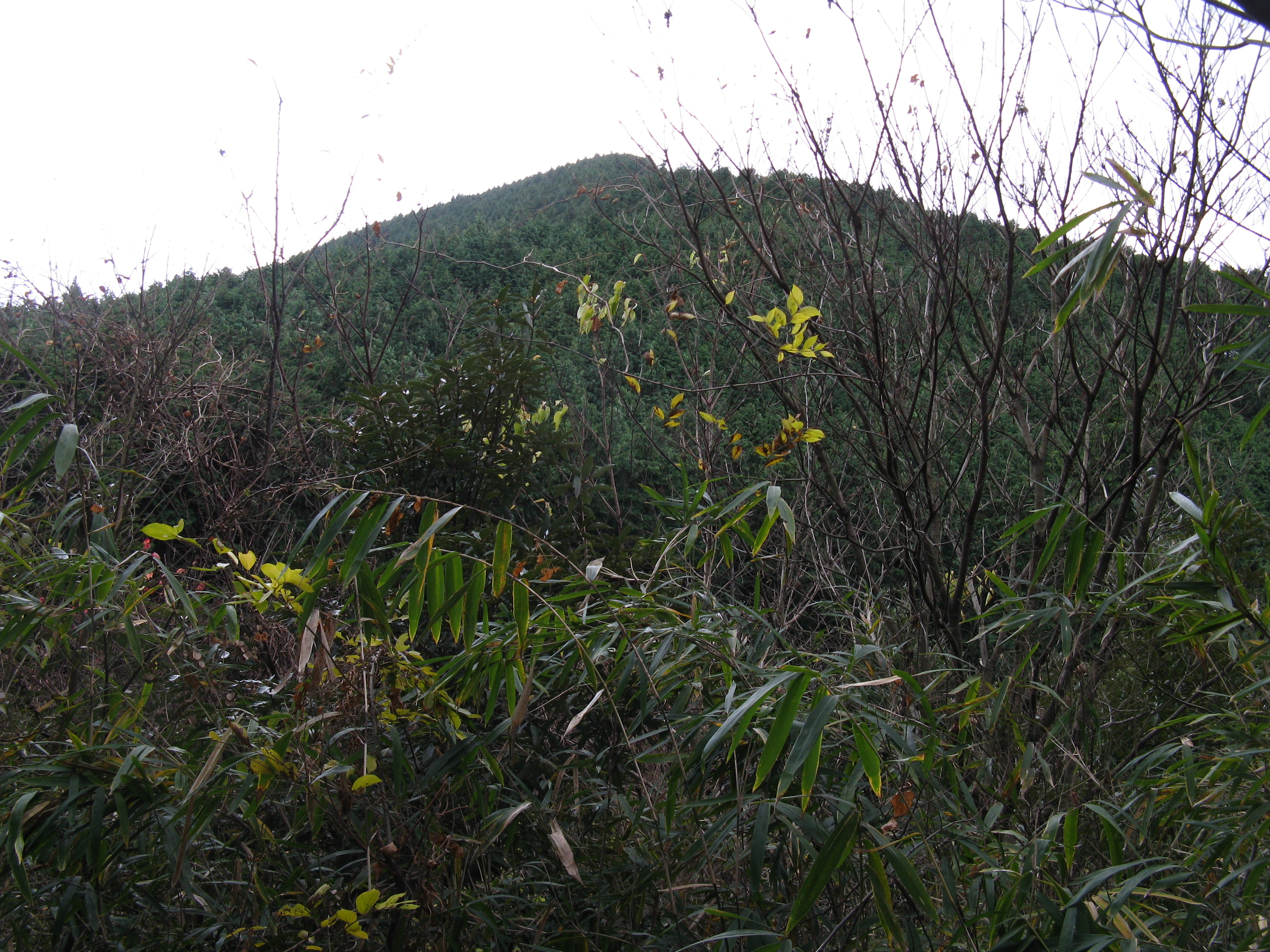
Mount Iwahashi

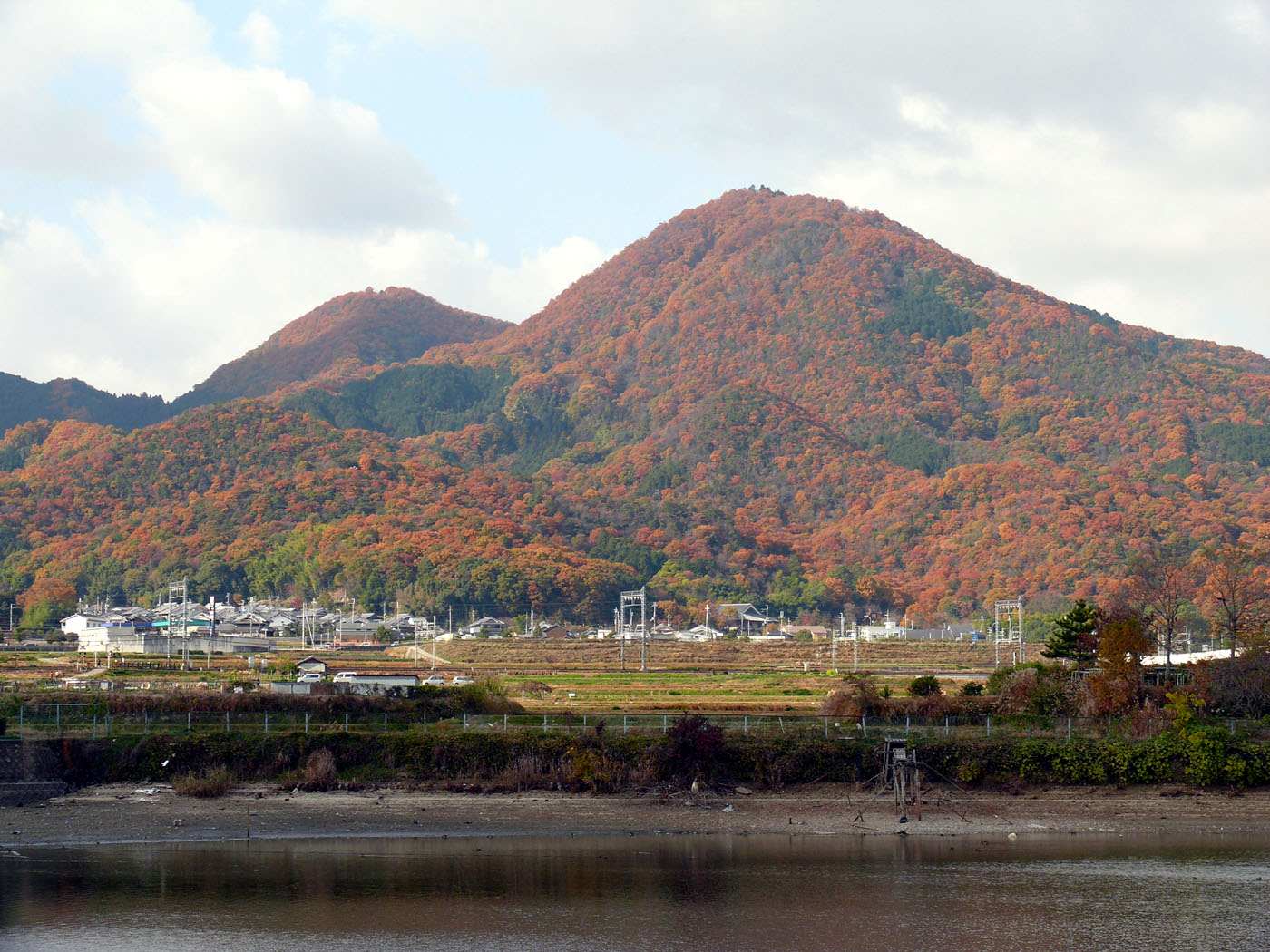
The double peaks of Mount Nijō
