= Sutra mound =

Type of archaeological site

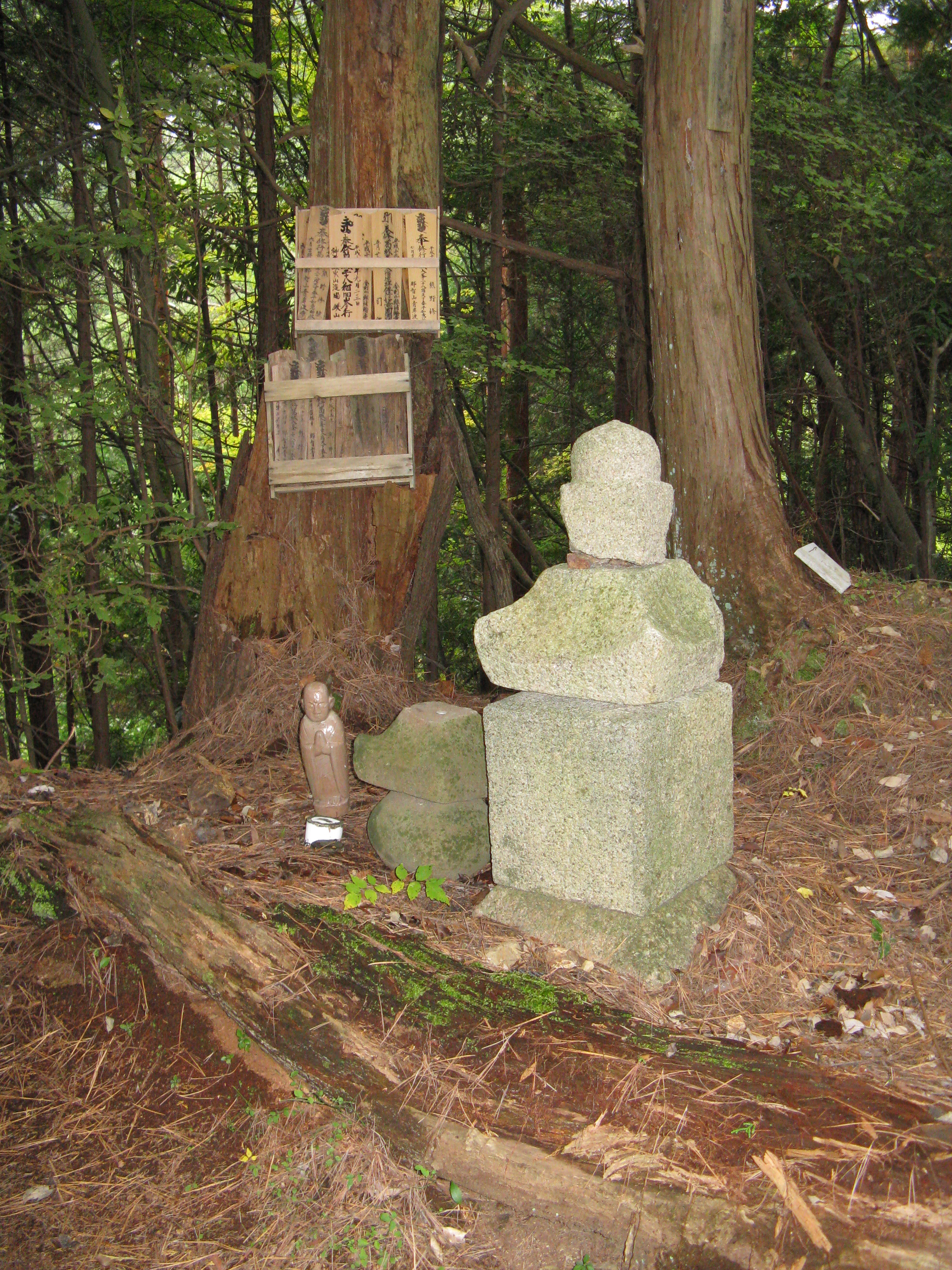
A sutra mound (15th mound of the Katsuragi 28 Shuku)

A sutra mound (経塚, kyōzuka) is an archaeological site where sūtras were buried underground. In Japanese Buddhism, it is a type of good deed, and was done as a type of puja.

Examples of sutra mounds include the Katsuragi 28 Shuku in the Kansai region of Japan.

== Description ==
In the Nara period, the practice of copying sutras was the center of Buddhism in the country, and was done as a government project. During the Heian period, however, the idea of Pure Land Buddhism spread, and with it the objective of doing personal prayer. In the middle part of the Heian period, it was predicted that the mappō age would come into existence, and it was said that this would start in China and Korea.

The Lotus Sutra was the main sutra that was buried, but the Heart Sutra, Amitabha Sutra, Mahavairocana Tantra, Vajrasekhara Sutra were also buried. In other locations, the Sutra of Immeasurable Meanings, Kannon sutra, and opening and closing sutras were also found. The sutras were usually copied onto paper, but materials like clay, copper, pebbles and shells were also used. The sutras were stored in metal vessels called kyōzutsu (経筒), and inscriptions were written on them.

The sutra tubes were small, but some hexagon-shaped boxes and two-storied pagoda shapes with affixed ornaments were found. The tubes also had caps on them. The tubes were usually made of metal or ceramics, but bamboo and other containers have also been found. The tubes were buried with ancient mirrors, coins, swords and jewels, and were buried with dehumidification substances like charcoal. The sutra tubes were often buried in sacred places such as mountain summits and on the grounds of Shinto temples. Occasionally they were buried underground or above ground, and stone huts were built to enshrine their contents.

== History ==
For Japanese buildings, in 1007, Fujiwara no Michinaga built the oldest sutra mound at the summit of Kinpusen, a mountain range in Yamato Province. He did so because there was a sense of impending danger about the coming of mappō among the aristocracy, and he wanted to prepare for the coming of Maitreya and ensure that the sutras would be passed along to future generations.

In the middle of the 12th century, a monk who traveled around the country went around handing out copies of the sutras to the masses as a way of improving his spirit and puja.

== Recent times ==
Since they were first buried, the small sutra tubes have decayed, so instead, sutra words have been written on small flat stones. Mounds containing stones where one character has been written on each, and mounds with multiple characters on each stone, became more popular. There are places where the stones were buried and covered up and a memorial stone was placed.

In recent centuries, an increase in agriculture and the permeation of a monetary economy has moved religious actions to the background. Giving copied sutras to temples has become a standard way to spread knowledge about the sutras.

== Clay tile sutras ==
While the ritual burial of sūtra, typically on paper, is known from over two thousand two hundred sites, at several that date to the late-Heian period, clay tile sutras (瓦経, gakyō) have been found. The text was incised into clay tiles that were then low fired; the selection of a more durable medium may have had some symbolic significance. Several examples have been excavated in Fukuoka Prefecture. A clay tile sutra mound in Itano is among the Historic Sites of Tokushima Prefecture.
