= Nichiren =

Japanese Buddhist monk and philosopher and True Buddha (1222–1282)

- 日蓮
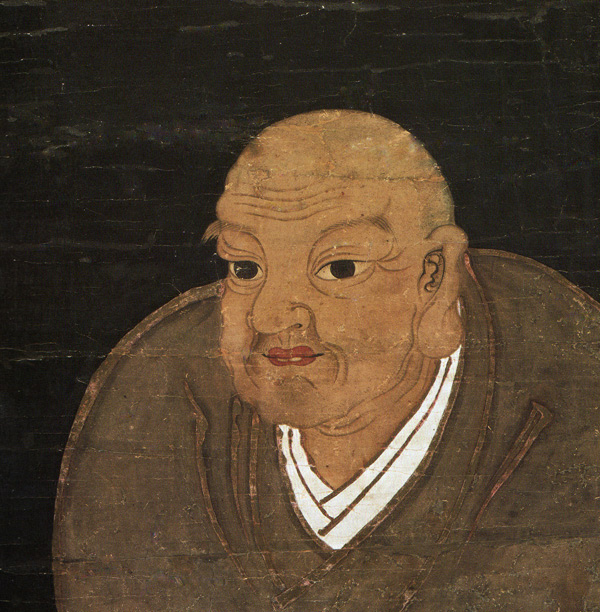
- Portrait from Kuon-ji Temple in Mount Minobu, Yamanashi prefecture, 15th century

Personal life
- Born: 16 February 1222 Kominato village, Awa province, Japan
- Died: 13 October 1282 (aged 60) Ikegami Daibo Hongyoji Temple, Musashi province, Japan
- Education: Kiyozumi-dera Temple (Seichō-ji), Enryaku-ji Temple on Mount Hiei
- Other names: Dai-Nichiren (大日蓮; Nichiren the Great); Nichiren Daishōnin (日蓮大聖人; Great Sage Nichiren); Nichiren Shōnin (日蓮聖人; The Sage Nichiren); Nichiren Dai-Bosatsu (日蓮大菩薩; Nichiren Great Bodhisattva)

Religious life
- Religion: Buddhism
- Denomination: Nichiren Buddhism
- School: Mahayana; Tendai
- Lineage: Shakyamuni Buddha; Tiantai (Zhiyi); Saichō
- Dharma name: Rencho (1234); Nichiren (1253)

Senior posting
- Teacher: Dōzenbo of Seichō-ji Temple

Daimoku (Nam-Myoho-Renge-Kyo) written by Nichiren

Nichiren (日蓮; Japanese pronunciation: [ɲi.tɕiꜜ.ɾeɴ, ɲiꜜ.tɕi.ɾeɴ], 16 February 1222 – 13 October 1282) was a Japanese Buddhist monk and philosopher of the Kamakura period. His teachings form the basis of Nichiren Buddhism, a unique branch of Japanese Mahayana Buddhism based on the Lotus Sutra.

Nichiren declared that the Lotus Sutra alone contains the highest truth of Buddhism and that it is the only sutra suited for the Age of Dharma Decline. He insisted that the sovereign of Japan and its people should support only this form of Buddhism and eradicate all others, or they would face social collapse and environmental disasters. Nichiren advocated the faithful recitation of the title of the Lotus Sutra, Namu Myōhō Renge Kyō, as the only effective path to Buddhahood in this very life, a path which he saw as accessible to all people regardless of class, education or ability. Nichiren held that Shakyamuni and all other Buddhist deities were manifestations of the Original Eternal Buddha (本仏 Honbutsu) of the Lotus Sutra, which he equated with the Lotus Sutra itself and its title. He also declared that believers of the Lotus Sutra must propagate it even though this would lead to many difficulties and even persecution, which Nichiren understood as a way of "reading" the Lotus Sutra with one's very body. Nichiren believed that the spread of the Lotus Sutra teachings would lead to the creation of a Pure Land on earth.

Nichiren was a prolific writer and his biography, temperament, and the evolution of his beliefs has been gleaned primarily from his writings. He claimed to be the reincarnation of bodhisattva Viśiṣṭacāritra (Jōgyō), and designated six senior disciples, which later led to much disagreement after his death. Nichiren's harsh critiques of the Buddhist establishment led to many persecutions against him and his followers. He was exiled twice and some of his followers were imprisoned or killed. After his death, Nichiren’s followers continued to grow, making it one of Japan's largest Buddhist traditions. He was posthumously bestowed the title Nichiren Dai-Bosatsu (日蓮大菩薩; Great Bodhisattva Nichiren) by the Emperor Go-Kōgon in 1358. The title Risshō Daishi (立正大師; Great Teacher of Correction) was also later conferred by the Emperor Taishō in 1922.

Nichiren Buddhism today includes more than forty different officially registered organizations, some of which have significant international presence. These include traditional temple schools such as Nichiren-shū sects and Nichiren Shōshū, as well as modern lay movements such as Soka Gakkai, Risshō Kōsei Kai, Reiyūkai, Kenshōkai, Honmon Butsuryū-shū, Kempon Hokke, and Shōshinkai among many others. Each group has varying views of Nichiren's teachings, some being more exclusivist than the others. Some see Nichiren as being the Bodhisattva Viśiṣṭacāritra, while other sects claim that Nichiren was actually the Primordial or "True Buddha" (本仏, Honbutsu).

== Life ==
The main narrative of Nichiren's life has been constructed from extant letters and treatises he wrote, counted in one collection as 523 complete writings and 248 fragments. Aside from historical documents stored in the repositories of various Nichiren sects, the first extensive non-religious biographical account of Nichiren did not appear until more than 200 years after his death. Several hagiographies about Nichiren are reflected in various pieces of artwork about incidents in his life.

Nichiren is most well known for his promotion of Lotus Sutra devotion over and above all other Buddhist scriptures and teachings. He held that reciting the title of the Lotus Sutra (with the formula Nam(u)-myoho-renge-kyo) encompassed all Buddhist teachings, and thus it could lead to enlightenment in this life. As a result of his adamant stance, he experienced severe persecution imposed by the Kamakura Shogunate, which Nichiren saw as proof of the righteousness of his cause to spread the Lotus Sutra.

Nichiren remains a controversial figure among scholars who cast him as either a fervent nationalist or a social reformer with a transnational religious vision. Critical scholars have used words such as intolerant, nationalistic, militaristic, and self-righteous to portray him. On the other hand, Nichiren has been presented as a revolutionary, a classic reformer, and as a prophet. Nichiren is often compared to other religious figures who shared similar rebellious and revolutionary drives to reform degeneration in their respective societies or schools.

=== Birth ===
According to the lunar Chinese calendar, Nichiren was born on 16th of the second month in 1222, which is 6 April in the Gregorian calendar.

Nichiren was born in the village of Kominato (today part of the city of Kamogawa), Nagase District, Awa Province (within present-day Chiba Prefecture). Accounts of his lineage vary. Nichiren described himself as "the son of a Sendara (Skt: chandala, despised outcast), "a son born of the lowly people living on a rocky strand of the out-of-the-way sea," and "the son of a sea-diver." In contrast, Hōnen, Shinran, Dōgen, and Eisai, the other founders of religious schools who predated Nichiren, were all born in the Kyoto region and came from noble or samurai backgrounds. Although his writings reflect a fierce pride of his lowly birth, followers after his death began to ascribe to him a more noble lineage, perhaps to attract more adherents. Some have claimed his father was a rōnin, a manorial functionary (shokan), or a political refugee.

Nichiren's father was Mikuni-no-Tayu Shigetada, also known as Nukina Shigetada Jiro (died 1258); and his mother was Umegiku-nyo (died 1267). On his birth, his parents named him Zennichimaro (善日麿) which has variously been translated into English as "Splendid Sun" and "Virtuous Sun Boy" among others. The exact site of Nichiren's birth is believed to be currently submerged off the shore from present-day Kominato-zan Tanjō-ji (小湊山誕生寺) near a temple in Kominato that commemorates his birth.

=== Buddhist education ===
At the age of 12 he began his Buddhist study at a temple of the Tendai school, Seichō-ji (清澄寺; also called Kiyosumi-dera). He was formally ordained as a novice at sixteen years old to became a monk at twenty years old and took the Buddhist name Zeshō-bō Renchō (是生房蓮長), Renchō meaning "Lotus Growth".

Between the years 1233 and 1253 Nichiren studied the major Buddhist traditions in Japan at that time, including Tendai, Pure Land Buddhism and Shingon. During these years, he became convinced of the preeminence of the Lotus Sutra and in 1253 returned to the temple where he first studied to present his findings.

In a 1271 letter Nichiren writes of this time of his life:

Determined to plant a seed of Buddhahood and attain Buddhahood in this life, just as all other people, I relied on Amida Buddha and chanted the name of this Buddha since childhood. However, I began doubting this practice, making a vow to study all the Buddhist sutras, commentaries on them by disciples, and explanatory notes by others.

He later left Seichō-ji for Kamakura where he studied Pure Land Buddhism, a school that stressed salvation through the invocation of the name Amitābha (Japanese Amida), a practiced called nembutsu. He also studied Zen which had been growing in popularity in both Kamakura and Kyoto. He next traveled to Mount Hiei, the center of Japanese Tendai Buddhism, where he scrutinized the school's original doctrines, including Pure Land and Tendai Esoteric Buddhism. In the final stage of this twenty-year period he traveled to Mount Kōya, the center of Shingon esoteric Buddhism, and to Nara where he studied its six established schools, especially the Ritsu sect which emphasized strict monastic discipline.

=== Declaration of the Lotus Sutra ===
According to one of his letters, Nichiren returned to Seicho-ji Temple on 28 April 1253 to lecture on the supremacy of the Lotus Sutra. What followed was his first public declaration of Nam(u) Myoho Renge Kyo atop Mount Kiyosumi that same day. This marked the start of his campaign to convince the Tendai tradition to shift its focus back to the Lotus Sutra and his efforts to convert the entire Japanese nation to this belief. This declaration also marks the start of his efforts to make profound Buddhist theory practical and actionable so an ordinary person could manifest Buddhahood within his or her own lifetime in the midst of day-to-day realities.

At the same event, according to his own account and subsequent hagiography, he changed his name to Nichiren, an abbreviation of nichi (日; "Sun") and ren (蓮; "Lotus"). Nichi represents both the light of truth and the sun goddess Amaterasu, symbolizing Japan itself. Ren signifies the Lotus Sutra. Nichiren envisioned Japan as the country where the true teaching of Buddhism would be revived and the starting point for its worldwide spread.

At his lecture, it is construed, Nichiren vehemently attacked Honen, the founder of Pure Land Buddhism, and its practice of chanting the Nembutsu. It is likely he also denounced the nembutsu teachings found at Seicho-ji. In so doing he earned the animosity of the local steward, Tojo Kagenobu, and eventually Nichiren was forced to leave the temple. Modern scholarship suggests that events unfolded not in a single day but over a longer period of time and had social, and political dimensions.

Nichiren then moved to a hermitage in the hills around Kamakura. From there he converted several Tendai priests, directly ordained others, and attracted lay disciples who were drawn mainly from the strata of the lower and middle samurai class. Their households provided Nichiren with economic support and became the core Nichiren communities in several locations in the Kanto region of Japan.

=== First remonstration to the Kamakura government ===
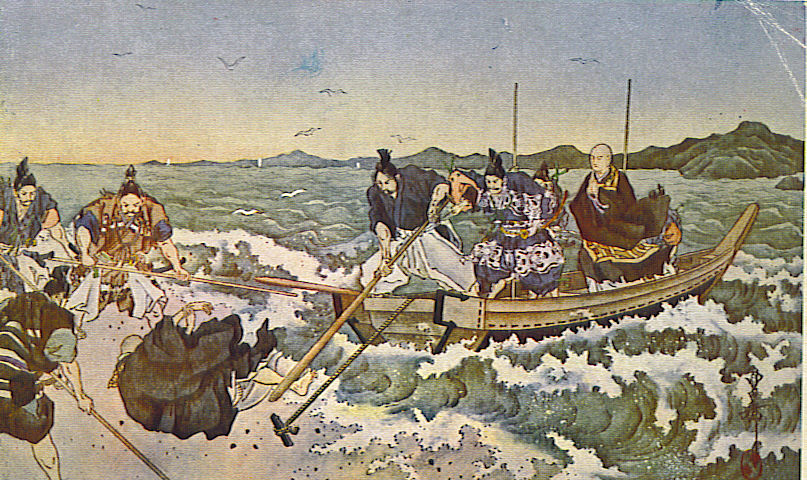
The banishment of Nichiren in 1261. The disciple Nichirō wished to follow but was forbidden to do so. Tourist postcard artwork, circa 1920s.

Nichiren arrived in Kamakura in 1254. Between 1254 and 1260 half of the population had perished due to a tragic succession of calamities that included drought, earthquakes, epidemics, famine, fires, and storms. Nichiren sought scriptural references to explain the unfolding of natural disasters and then wrote a series of works which, based on the Buddhist theory of the non-duality of the human mind and the environment, attributed the sufferings to the weakened spiritual condition of people, thereby causing the Kami (protective forces or traces of the Buddha) to abandon the nation. The root cause of this, he argued, was the widespread decline of the Dharma due to the mass adoption of the exclusive nembutsu teachings of Hōnen.

The most renowned of these works, considered his first major treatise, was the Risshō Ankoku Ron (立正安国論), "On Securing the Peace of the Land through the Propagation of True Buddhism." (Note: Also translated as "On Establishing the Correct Teaching for the Peace of the Land" (The Writings of Nichiren), "Establishment of the Legitimate Teaching for the Protection of the Country" (Selected Writings of Nichiren), and others.) Nichiren submitted it to Hōjō Tokiyori, the de facto leader of the Kamakura shogunate, as a political move to effectuate radical reform. In it he argued the necessity for "the Sovereign to recognize and accept the singly true and correct form of Buddhism (i.e., 立正 risshō) as the only way to achieve peace and prosperity for the land and its people and end their suffering (i.e., 安国 ankoku)."

Using a dialectic form well-established in China and Japan, the treatise is a 10-segment fictional dialogue between a Buddhist wise man, presumably Nichiren, and a visitor who together lament the tragedies that have beleaguered the nation. The wise man answers the guest's questions and, after a heated exchange, gradually leads him to enthusiastically embrace the vision of a country grounded firmly on the ideals of the Lotus Sutra. In this writing Nichiren displays a skill in using analogy, anecdote, and detail to persuasively appeal to an individual's unique psychology, experiences, and level of understanding.

The teacher builds his argument by quoting extensively from a set of Buddhist sutras and commentaries. In his future writings Nichiren continued to draw from the same sutras and commentaries which he deemed supportive of the Lotus Sutra, including the Konkomyo, Daijuku, Ninno, Yakushi, and Nirvana sutras. They share in common themes like prophecies of Dharma decline and nation-protecting teachings. The Risshō Ankoku Ron concludes with an urgent appeal to the ruler to cease all financial support for Buddhist schools promoting inferior teachings. Otherwise, Nichiren warns, as predicted by the sutras, the continued influence of inferior teachings would invite even more natural disasters as well as the outbreak of civil strife and foreign invasion.

Nichiren submitted his treatise on 16 July 1260 but it drew no official response. It did, however, prompt a severe backlash from the Buddhist priests of other schools. Nichiren was challenged to a religious debate with leading Kamakura prelates in which, by his account, they were swiftly dispatched. Their lay followers then formed a mob and attacked Nichiren at his dwelling, forcing him to flee Kamakura. His critics had influence with key governmental figures and spread slanderous rumors about him. One year after he submitted the Rissho Ankoku Ron the authorities had him arrested and exiled to the Izu peninsula.

Nichiren's Izu exile lasted two years. In his extant writings from this time period, Nichiren began to strongly draw from chapters 10–22 of the Lotus Sutra, what Tanabe calls its "third realm" (daisan hōmon). Nichiren began to emphasize the purpose of human existence as being the practice of the bodhisattva ideal in the real world which entails undertaking struggle and manifesting endurance. He suggested that he is a model of this behavior, a "votary" (gyōja) of the Lotus Sutra.

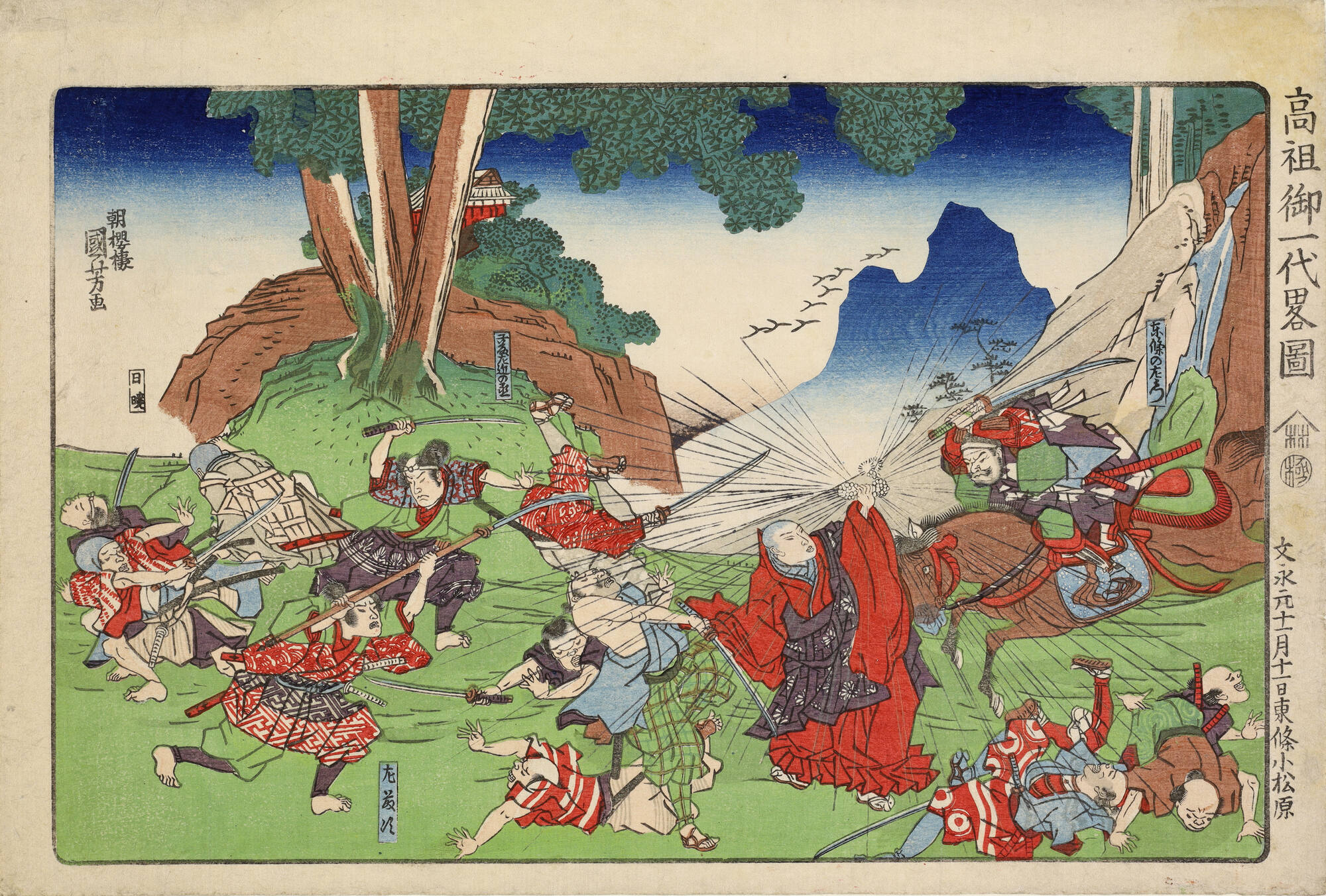
Tojo no Saemon Attacks Nichiren at Komatsubara

Upon being pardoned in 1263 Nichiren returned to Kamakura. In November 1264 he was ambushed and nearly killed at Komatsubara in Awa Province by a force led by Lord Tōjō Kagenobu. He suffered a broken arm and a sword cut across his forehead, and one of his followers was killed. For the next few years he preached in provinces outside of Kamakura but returned in 1268. At this point the Mongols sent envoys to Japan demanding tribute and threatening invasion. Nichiren sent 11 letters to influential leaders reminding them about his predictions in the Rissho Ankoku Ron.

=== Attempt at execution ===
The threat of Mongol invasion was the worst crisis in pre-modern Japanese history. In 1269 Mongol envoys again arrived to demand Japanese submission to their hegemony and the bakufu responded by mobilizing military defenses. The role of Buddhism in "nation-protection" (chingo kokka) was long established in Japan at this time and the government galvanized prayers from Buddhist schools for this purpose. Nichiren and his followers, however, felt emboldened that the predictions he had made in 1260 of foreign invasion seemingly were being fulfilled. Nichiren redoubled his efforts and continued to give regular lectures as more people joined the movement. Daring a rash response from the bakufu, Nichiren vowed in letters to his followers that he was giving his life to actualize the Lotus Sutra. He accelerated his polemics against the non-Lotus teachings the government had been patronizing at the very time it was attempting to solidify national unity and resolve. In a series of letters to prominent leaders he directly provoked the major prelates of Kamakura temples that the Hojo family patronized, criticized the principles of Zen which was popular among the samurai class, critiqued the esoteric practices of Shingon just as the government was invoking them, and condemned the ideas underlying Risshū as it was enjoying a revival.His actions at that time have been described by modern scholars either as a high form of altruism, or the ravings of a fanatic.

His claims drew the ire of the influential religious figures of the time and their followers, especially the Shingon priest Ryōkan (良観). In September 1271, after a fiery exchange of letters between the two, Nichiren was arrested by a band of soldiers and tried by Hei no Saemon (平の左衛門; also called 平頼綱 Taira no Yoritsuna), the deputy chief of the Hojo clan's Board of Retainers. Nichiren considered this as his second remonstration to the government.

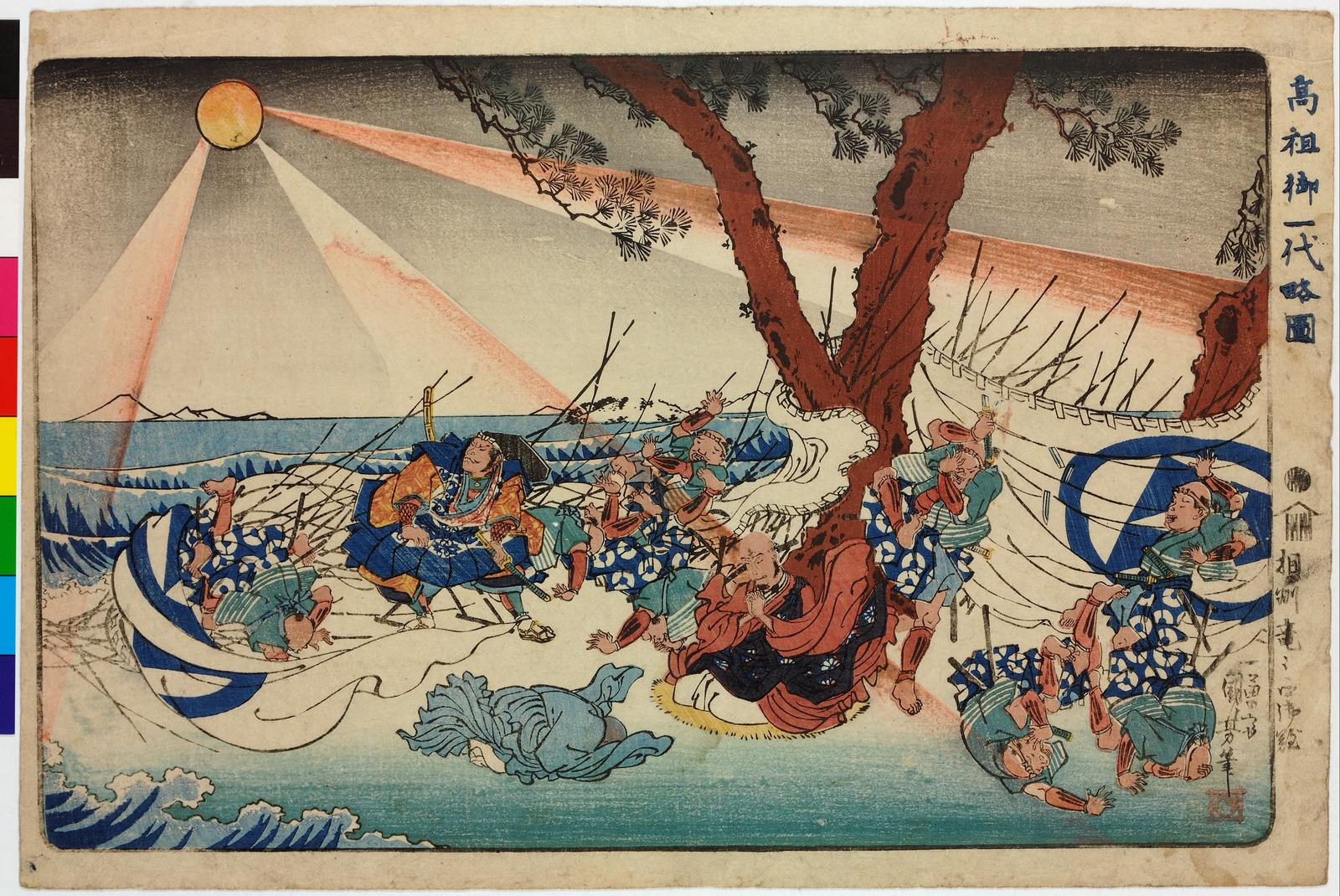
Depiction of the alleged execution event stopped by a bright orb

According to Nichiren's own account, he was sentenced to exile but was brought to Tatsunukuchi beach in Shichirigahama for execution. According to some traditional accounts, the execution was stopped at the final moment as "a brilliant orb as bright as the moon" arced over the execution grounds, terrifying Nichiren's executioners. Modern scholars have proposed alternative narratives for this story and question its historicity. Whatever the case, Nichiren himself believed he had undergone a transformative experience. After this event, Nichiren was exiled to Sado Island. This incident has become known as the "Tatsunokuchi Persecution" and was regarded by Nichiren as a death-and-resurrection turning point. In the Nichiren tradition this is called his moment of Hosshaku kenpon (発迹顕本), translated as "casting off the transient and revealing the true" or "outgrowing the provisional and revealing the essential."

=== Second banishment and exile ===
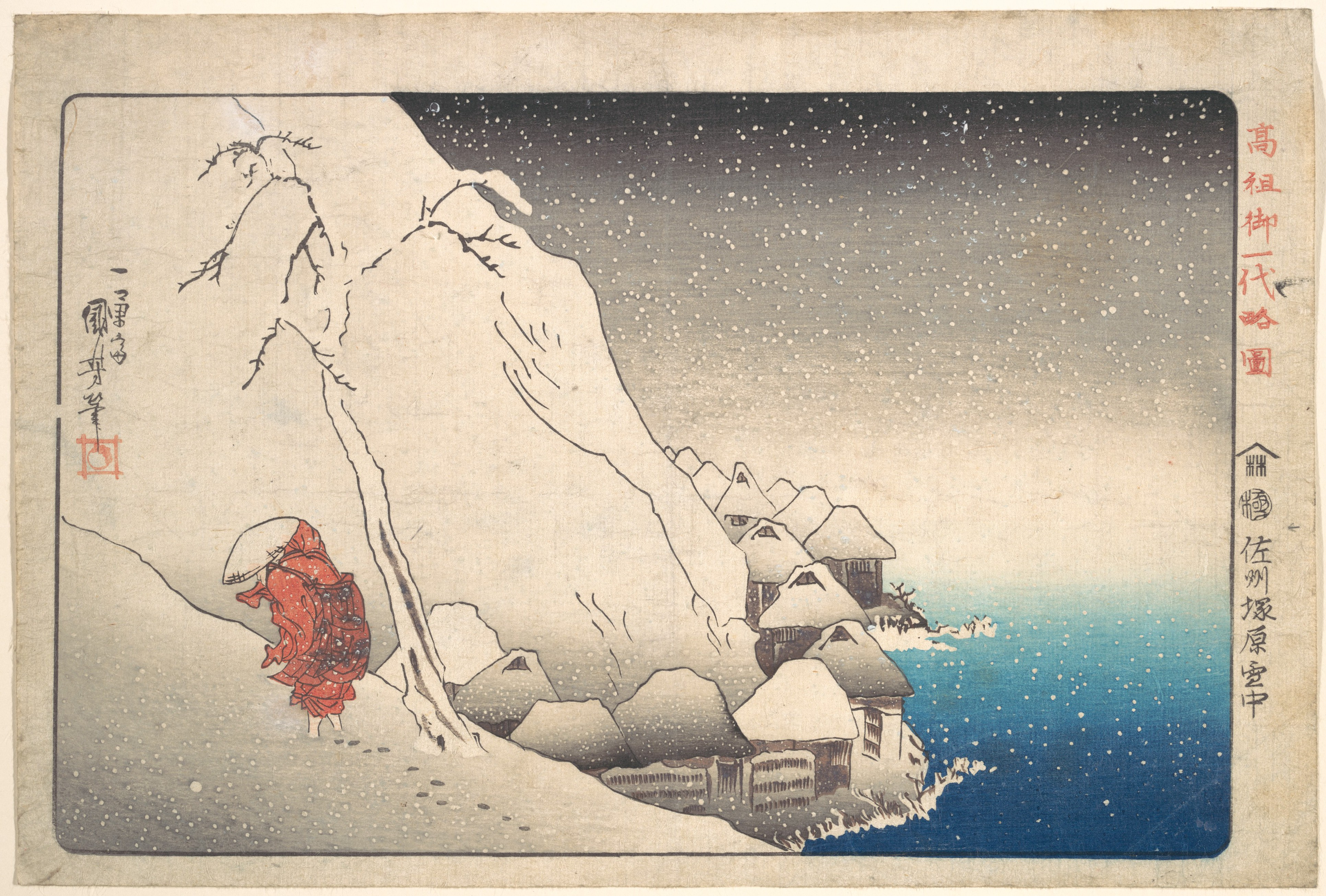
Nichiren in the Snow at Tsukahara, Sado Province

Nichiren was then exiled to a second location, on Sado Island in the Sea of Japan. Upon arriving, he was dispatched to a small dilapidated temple located in a graveyard. Nichiren was accompanied by a few disciples and in the first winter they endured terrible cold, food deprivation, and threats from local inhabitants. Nichiren scholars describe a clear shift in both tone and message in letters written before his Sado exile and those written during and after. Initially, Nichiren's urgent concern was to rally his followers in Kamakura. The tactics of the bakufu suppression of the Nichiren community included exile, imprisonment, land confiscation, or ousting from clan membership. Apparently a majority of his disciples abandoned their faith and others questioned why they and Nichiren were facing such adversity in light of the Lotus Sutra's promise of "peace and security in the present life."

In some of his writings during a second exile (1271–1274), Nichiren began to identify himself with two major Lotus Sutra bodhisattvas: Sadāparibhūta and Viśiṣṭacāritra. Sadāparibhūta ("Never Despising") is a key figure in the Lotus Sutra, who in the 20th chapter invited repeated persecution in his efforts to propagate the sutra by paying homage to everyone he meets and telling them they will be a Buddha. His hardship, Nichiren argued, fulfilled and validated the Lotus Sutra. He thus began to see himself as "bodily reading the Lotus Sutra (Jpn. Hokke shikidoku), which meant that due to his attempts to teach the Lotus Sutra and the hardships he faced, he was re-enacting the practices of Sadāparibhūta bodhisattva. Nichiren also identified himself with the bodhisattva Viśiṣṭacāritra ("Superior Practice") to whom Shakyamuni entrusted the future propagation of the Lotus Sutra, seeing himself in the role of leading a vast outpouring of Bodhisattvas of the Earth who pledged to liberate the oppressed.

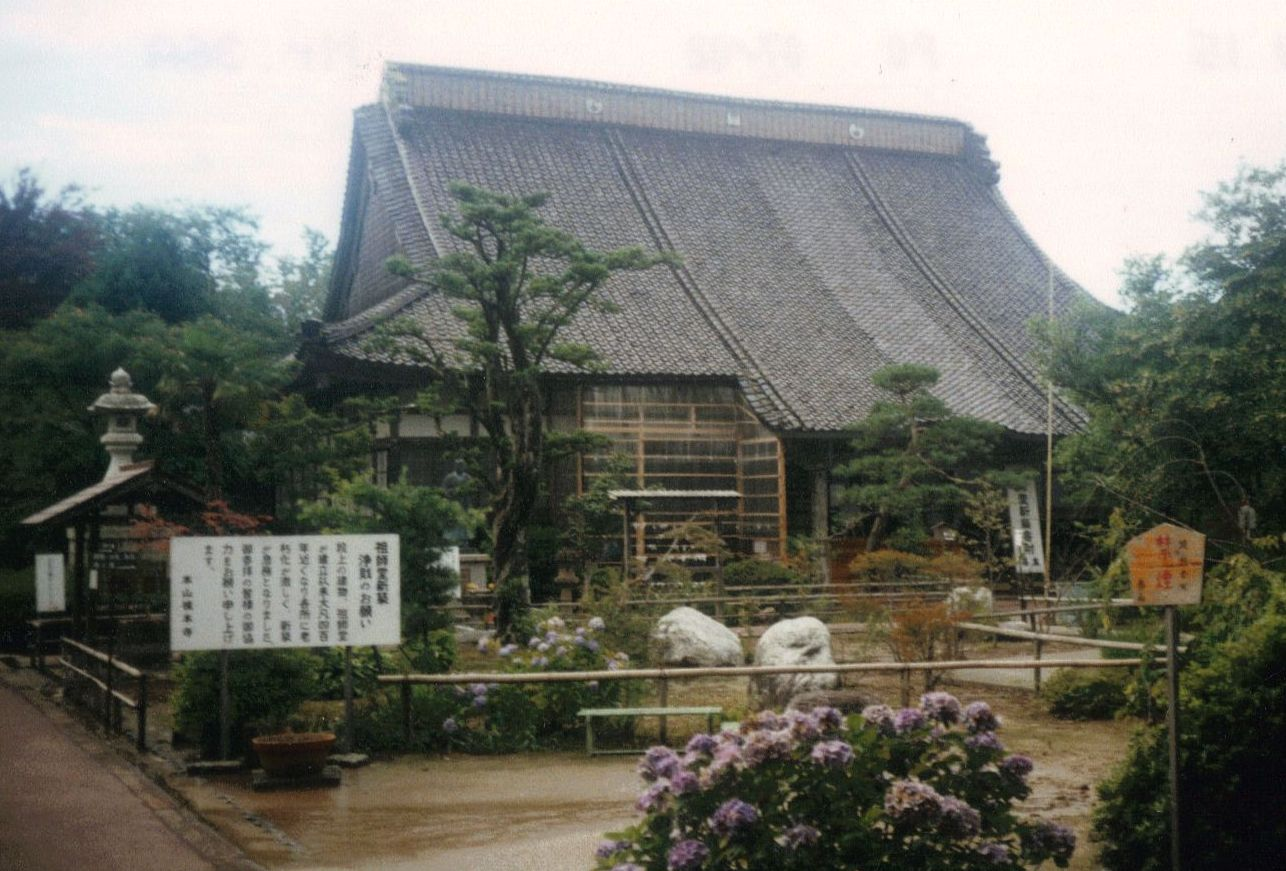
Konpon Temple was built on Sado where Nichiren lived during his exile.

The numerous letters and minor treatises he wrote in Sado include what is considered his two most significant works, the Kanjin no Honzon Shō (観心本尊抄; "The Object of Devotion for Observing the Mind") and the Kaimoku Shō (開目抄; "On the Opening of the Eyes"). The former text discusses the practice of daimoku as a form of "mind contemplation" (kanjin 観心), which is the appropriate practice for the Age of Dharma Decline. In the latter text he stated that facing adversity should be regarded as a matter of course and that the resolve to carry on with the mission to propagate the sutra was for him more important than guarantees of protection: "Let Heaven forsake me. Let ordeals confront me. I will not begrudge bodily life... . No matter what trials we may encounter, so long as we do not have a mind of doubt, I and my disciples will naturally achieve the Buddha realm." He concluded this work with the vow to be the "pillar of Japan, the eyes of Japan, the great ship of Japan."

=== The Mandala Gohonzon ===
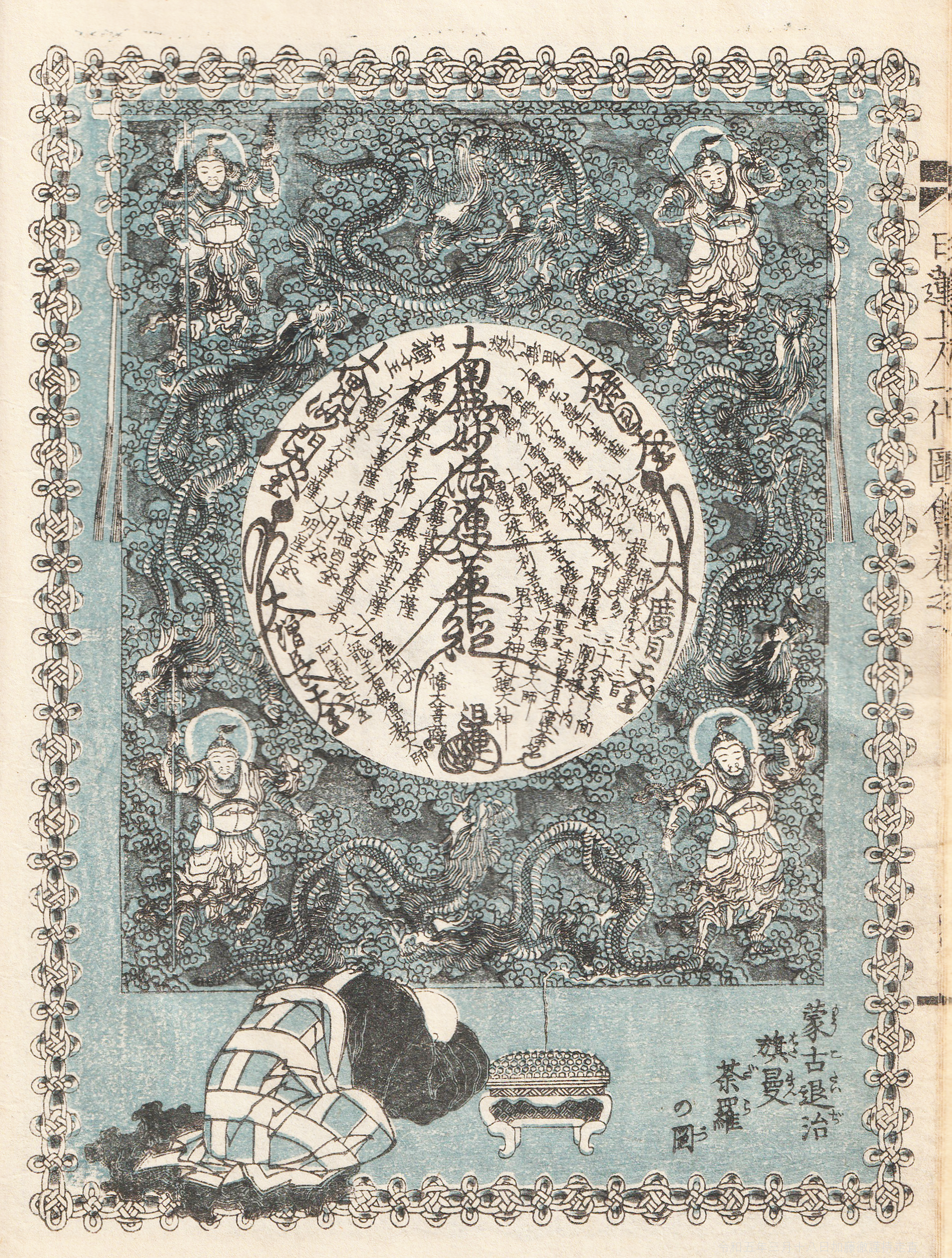
Nichiren bowing before the Mandala Gohonzon which he wrote by himself

At the end of the 1271–1272 winter Nichiren's conditions had improved. He had attracted a small band of followers in Sado who provided him with support and disciples from the mainland began visiting him and providing supplies. In 1272 there was an attempted coup in Kamakura and Kyoto, seemingly fulfilling the prediction he had made in the Rissho Ankoku Ron of rebellion in the country. At this point Nichiren was transferred to much better accommodations.

While on Sado island, Nichiren inscribed the first Mandala Gohonzon (御本尊). Although there is evidence of a Gohonzon in embryonic form as far back as the days right before his exile, the first in full form is dated to 8 July 1273 and includes the inscription of "Nichiren inscribes this for the first time." His writings on Sado provide his rationale for a calligraphic mandala depicting the assembly at Vulture Peak (Gṛdhrakūṭa) which was to be used as an object of devotion or worship. Nichiren found doctrinal rational for this in the 16th (Life span) chapter of the Lotus Sutra. It is at this time that he developed the concept of a three-fold "secret Dharma" of the daimoku, the object of worship (honzon), and the ordination platform (kaidan).

At the bottom of each mandala he wrote: "This is the great mandala never before revealed in Jambudvipa during the more than 2,200 years since the Buddha's nirvana." He inscribed many Mandala Gohonzon during the rest of his life. More than a hundred Mandala Gohonzon preserved today are attributed to Nichiren's own hand.

=== Return to Kamakura ===
In 1274, after his two predictions of foreign invasion and political strife were seemingly actualized by the first attempted Mongol invasion of Japan along with an unsuccessful coup within the Hōjō clan, Nichiren was pardoned by the Shogunate authorities.The pardon came in effect on 14 February 1274 and Nichiren returned to Kamakura one month later on March 26. Nichiren wrote that his innocence and the accuracy of his predictions caused the regent Hōjō Tokimune to intercede on his behalf. Scholars have suggested that some of his well-connected followers might have had influence on the government's decision to release him.

On 8 April he was summoned by Hei no Saemon, who inquired about the timing of the next Mongol invasion. Nichiren predicted that it would occur within the year. He used the audience as yet another opportunity to remonstrate with the government. Claiming that reliance on prayers based on esoteric rituals would invite further calamity, he urged the bakufu to ground itself exclusively on the Lotus Sutra.

Deeply disappointed by the government's refusal to heed his advice, Nichiren left Kamakura one month later, on 12 May, determined to become a solitary wayfarer. Five days later, however, on a visit to the residence of Lord Hakii Sanenaga of Mt. Minobu, he learned that followers in nearby regions had held steadfast during his exile. Despite severe weather and deprivation, Nichiren remained in Minobu for the rest of his career.

=== Retirement to Mount Minobu ===
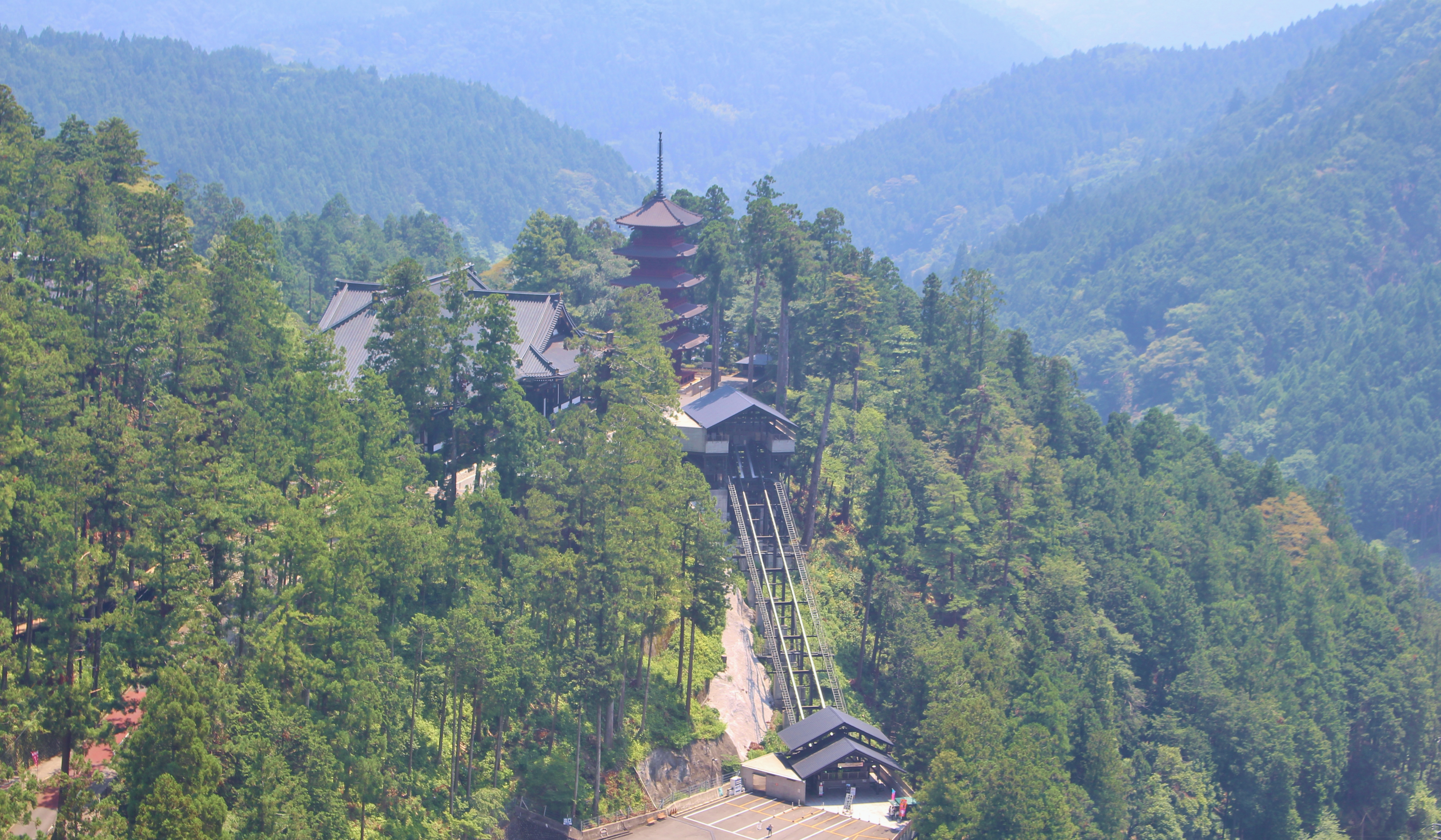
The Eternal Temple on Mount Minobu

During his self-imposed exile at Mount Minobu, a location in Kai province, 100 miles west of Kamakura. Nichiren led a widespread movement of followers in Kanto and Sado mainly through his prolific letter-writing. During the so-called "Atsuhara affair" of 1279 when governmental attacks were aimed at Nichiren's followers rather than himself, Nichiren's letters reveal an assertive and well-informed leader who provided detailed instructions through a sophisticated network of disciples serving as liaisons between Minobu and other affected areas in Japan. He also showed the ability to provide a compelling narrative of events that gave his followers a broad perspective of what was unfolding.

More than half of the extant letters of Nichiren were written during his years at Minobu. Some consisted of moving letters to followers expressing appreciation for their assistance, counseling on personal matters, and explaining his teachings in more understandable terms. Two of his works from this period, the Senji Shō (撰時抄; "The Selection of the Time") and the Hōon Shō (報恩抄; "On Repaying Debts of Gratitude") constitute, along with his Risshō Ankoku Ron ("On Establishing the Correct Teaching for the Peace of the Land"), Kaimoku Shō ("The Opening of the Eyes"), and Kanjin no Honzon Shō ("The Object of Devotion for Observing the Mind"), what is commonly regarded as his five major writings.

During his years at Minobu Nichiren intensified his attacks on mystical and esoteric practices (密教, mikkyō) that had been incorporated into the Japanese Tendai school. It becomes clear at this point that he understood that he was creating his own form of Lotus Buddhism. Nichiren and his disciples completed the Myō-hōkke-in Kuon-ji Temple (久遠寺) in 1281. In the 19th century this structure burned down to be replaced by a new structure completed in the second half of the Meiji era.

While at Minobu Nichiren also inscribed numerous Mandala Gohonzon for bestowal upon specific disciples and lay believers. Nichiren Shoshu believers claim that after the execution of the three Atsuhara farmers he inscribed the Dai Gohonzon on 12 October 1279, a Gohonzon specifically addressed to all humanity. This assertion has been disputed by other schools as historically and textually incorrect. It is apparent that Nichiren took great care in deciding which of his disciples were eligible to receive a Gohonzon inscribed by him. In the case of a letter written to Lady Niiama he took great care to explain why he would not inscribe a Gohonzon despite a deep personal bond. Among the Gohonzon he inscribed were several that were quite large and perhaps intended for congregational use in chapels maintained by some lay followers.

=== Death ===
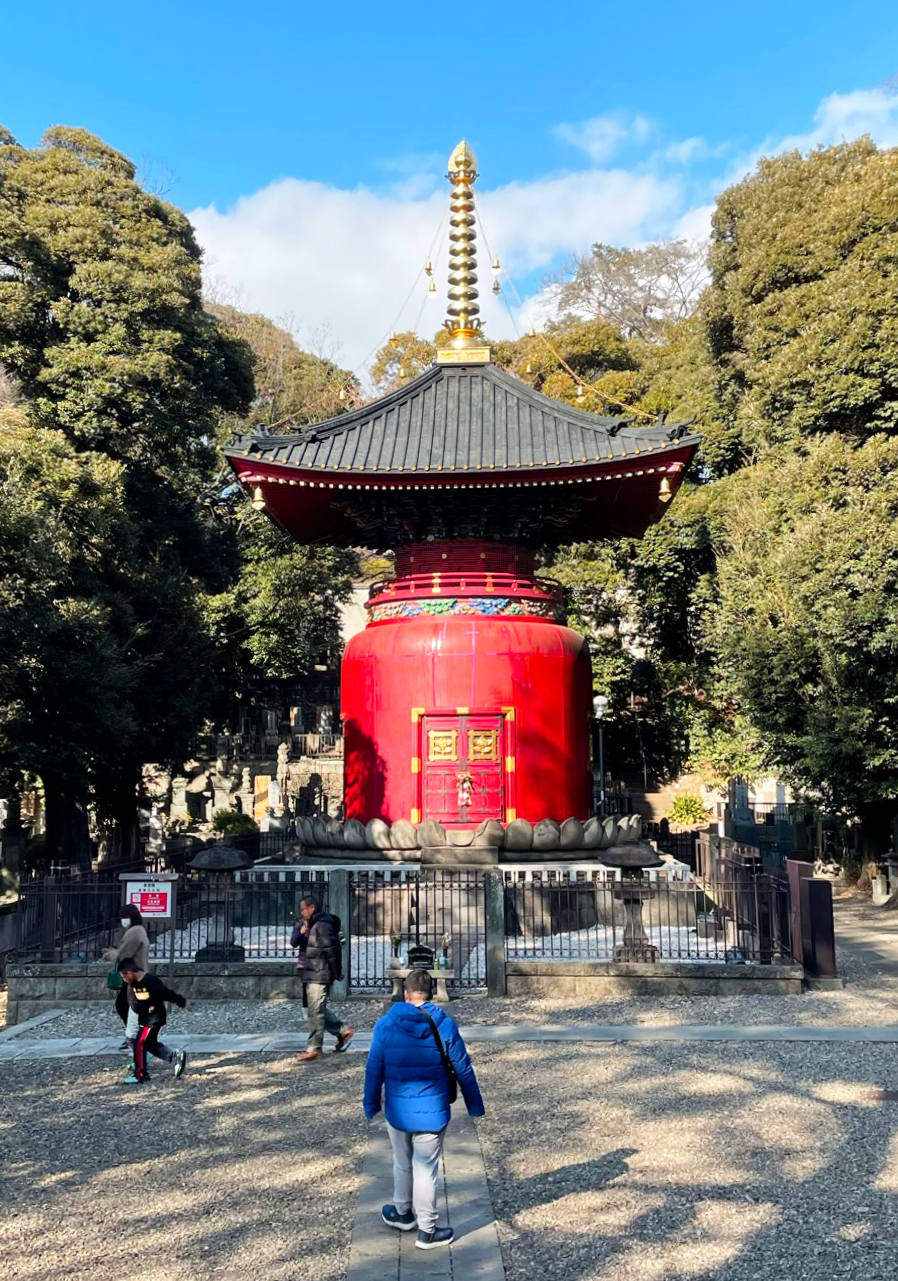
Memorial tower erected on the spot where Nichiren was cremated in 1282 (Ikegami Honmon-ji Temple, Tokyo)

In 1282, after years of seclusion, Nichiren fell ill. His followers encouraged him to travel to the hot springs in Hitachi for their medicinal benefits. He was also encouraged by his disciples to travel there for the warmer weather, and to use the land offered by Hagiri Sanenaga for recuperation. En route, unable to travel further, he stopped at the home of a disciple in Ikegami, outside of present-day Tokyo, and died on 13 October 1282. According to legend, he died in the presence of fellow disciples after having spent several days lecturing from his sickbed on the Lotus Sutra, writing a final letter, and leaving instructions for the future of his movement after his death, namely the designation of the six senior disciples. His funeral and cremation took place the following day.

His disciples left Ikegami with Nichiren's ashes on 21 October, reaching back to Minobu on 25 October.

- Nichiren Shu sects claims his tomb is sited, as per his request, at Kuon-ji on Mount Minobu where his ashes remain.
- Nichiren Shoshu asserts that Nikko Shonin later confiscated his cremated ashes along with other articles and brought them to Mount Fuji which, they say are now enshrined on the left side next to the Dai Gohonzon within the Hoando storage house. (Note: "please build my grave on Mount Minobu, because that is where is where I spent nine years reciting the Lotus Sutra to my heart's content. My heart lives forever on Mount Minobu")

== Teachings ==
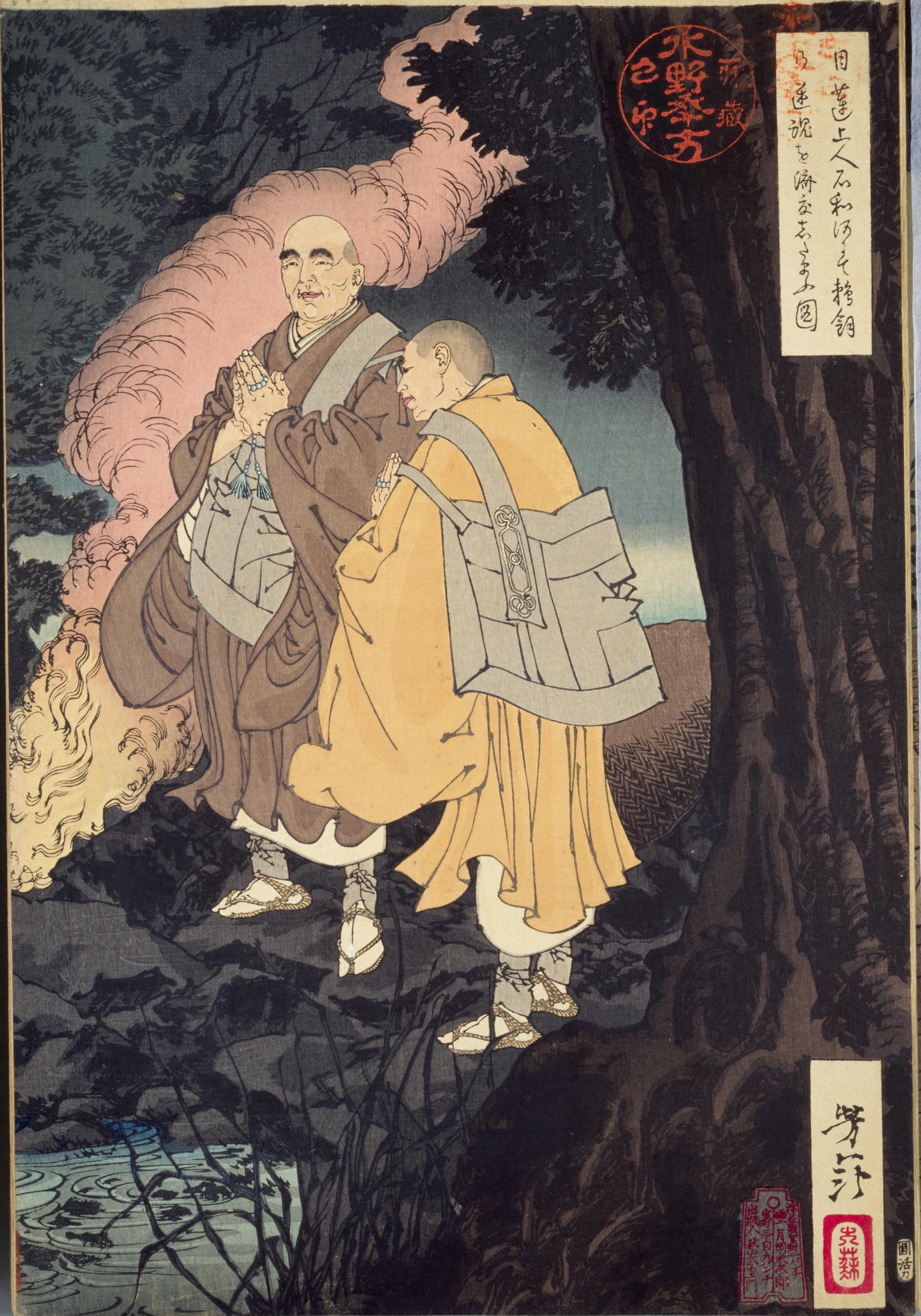
Print illustration of Nichiren and a disciple, by Tsukioka Yoshitoshi.

Nichiren's teachings developed over the course of his career and their evolution can be seen through the study of his writings as well as in the annotations he made in his personal copy of the Lotus Sutra, the so-called Chū-hokekyō. Some scholars set a clear demarcation in his teachings divided by his arrival on Sado Island, whereas others see a threefold division of thought: (1) up to and through the Izu exile, (2) from his return to Kamakura through the Sado Island exile, and (3) during his years at Minobu. According to Anesaki, Nichiren, upon his arrival at Minobu, quickly turned his attention to consolidating his teachings toward their perpetuation. The scope of his thinking was outlined in an essay Hokke Shuyō-shō (法華取要抄; "Choosing the Heart of the Lotus Sutra"), considered by Nikkō Shōnin as one of Nichiren's ten major writings.

Nichiren's main ideas include an affirmation of the supremacy of the Lotus Sutra and the eternal Buddha of the Lotus Sutra, the fact that all beings could achieve Buddhahood in this life, the centrality of the daimoku as the best practice for mappō, and the importance of spreading the teachings of the Lotus Sutra. Nichiren's vision of widely and extensively spreading the Lotus Sutra (Kosen-rufu) looks towards a time when the teachings would be widely spread throughout the world. Nichiren also set a precedent for Buddhist activism centuries before its emergence in other Buddhist schools. He held adamantly that his teachings would permit a nation to right itself and ultimately lead to world peace.

Some of his religious thinking was derived from the Tendai tradition and the works of Chinese Tiantai masters Zhiyi and Zhanran, as well as from new perspectives that were products of Kamakura Buddhism. Other ideas were completely original and unique to Nichiren.

=== The Final Age and the state of Japan ===
The Kamakura period (1185-1333) was characterized by a sense of decline and foreboding. Nichiren, as well as the others of this time, believed that they had entered the Age of Dharma Decline or the "Final Dharma Age" (Mappō). The Kamakura period, a time of natural disasters, internal strife, wars, and political conflict, gave many Japanese the impression that the era of decline had begun. According to various Mahayana sutras, during the age of decline, most of the Buddha's teachings would be lost or lose their efficacy. Nichiren held that since Japan had entered Mappō, teachings like nembutsu, Zen and esoteric practices were no longer effective – only Lotus Sutra practices were effective.

Nichiren also believed that the world had entered the final age of degeneration. Like many Buddhists of his time, he held that this was a reflection of the degenerate state of the minds of the people. This is based on the classic Mahayana theory that says that the world is a reflection of the collective karmic traces of the minds of all beings living in the world. For Nichiren, the activities of the Japanese elite had caused the current state of chaos. Furthermore, Nichiren held that due to their lack of virtue, Japan was being abandoned by the gods, leading to the natural disasters which were occurring and to the threat of Mongol invasion. Japan had a long-established system of folk beliefs (now called Shinto) based on local Kami (indigenous deities). These had been adopted by Buddhist traditions, who often argued that kami were 'traces' of the Buddha. Buddhists institutions often engaged in rites calling on Kami as well as on Buddhist deities, to protect the nation (chingo kokka). Nichiren argued that the various protective deities had abandoned Japan because the court and the people had turned away from the true Dharma of the Lotus Sutra to false teachings. Thus, if the government and the people turned to the true Dharma, society would transform into an ideal world in which peace and wisdom prevail and "the wind will not thrash the branches nor the rain fall hard enough to break clods."

Although Nichiren attributed the turmoils and disasters in society to the widespread practice of what he deemed inferior Buddhist teachings sponsored by the government, he was also enthusiastically upbeat about the portent of the age. He asserted, in contrast to other schools, Mappō was the best possible time to be alive, since now the Bodhisattvas of the Earth would appear teach and spread the Lotus Sutra.

=== Five Principles ===
Nichiren also taught Five Principles (gogi) or five criteria for evaluating Buddhist teachings and establishing the supremacy of the Lotus Sutra as the highest and best teaching for Japan at his time. The five are:

- The teaching (kyō) - Following the Tiantai classification system, Nichiren sees the Lotus as part of the last teaching period of the Buddha and as the real true (jitsu) teaching, while all other teachings are provisional (gon). He cites Tiantai masters like Zhiyi, and the Lotus Sutra itself and points to its teachings on the one vehicle and the eternal immanent nature of the Buddha to prove this.
- The innate capacity (ki) of the people - Nichiren held that people of the Final Dharma Age lack good roots (honmi uzen). Thus, they first need to encounter the Lotus Sutra to plant these good roots. Nichiren rejects the view of Hōnen that the Lotus is too profound for beings of the Final Age. Nichiren cites Zhanran who writes "the more true the teaching, the lower the stage [of the practitioners it can bring to enlightenment]". Thus, Nichiren argues that faith in the Lotus Sutra can save all types of people, even the most ignorant or lowly.
- The time (ji), which refers to the Final Dharma Age. Nichiren believed that the Lotus Sutra was the right sutra for the Final Age, and that the daimoku was the right teaching for this time, being easy and accessible to all.
- The land or country (koku) - As Stone writes "following earlier Tendai thinkers such as Saichō, Annen, and Genshin, Nichiren argued that the country of Japan is related exclusively to the Lotus Sutra."
- The sequence of Dharma propagation (kyōhō rufu no zengo), which means that one should not teach an inferior or provisional teaching in a place where a superior teaching has already been taught.

=== Buddhahood and the mutual inclusion of all realms ===
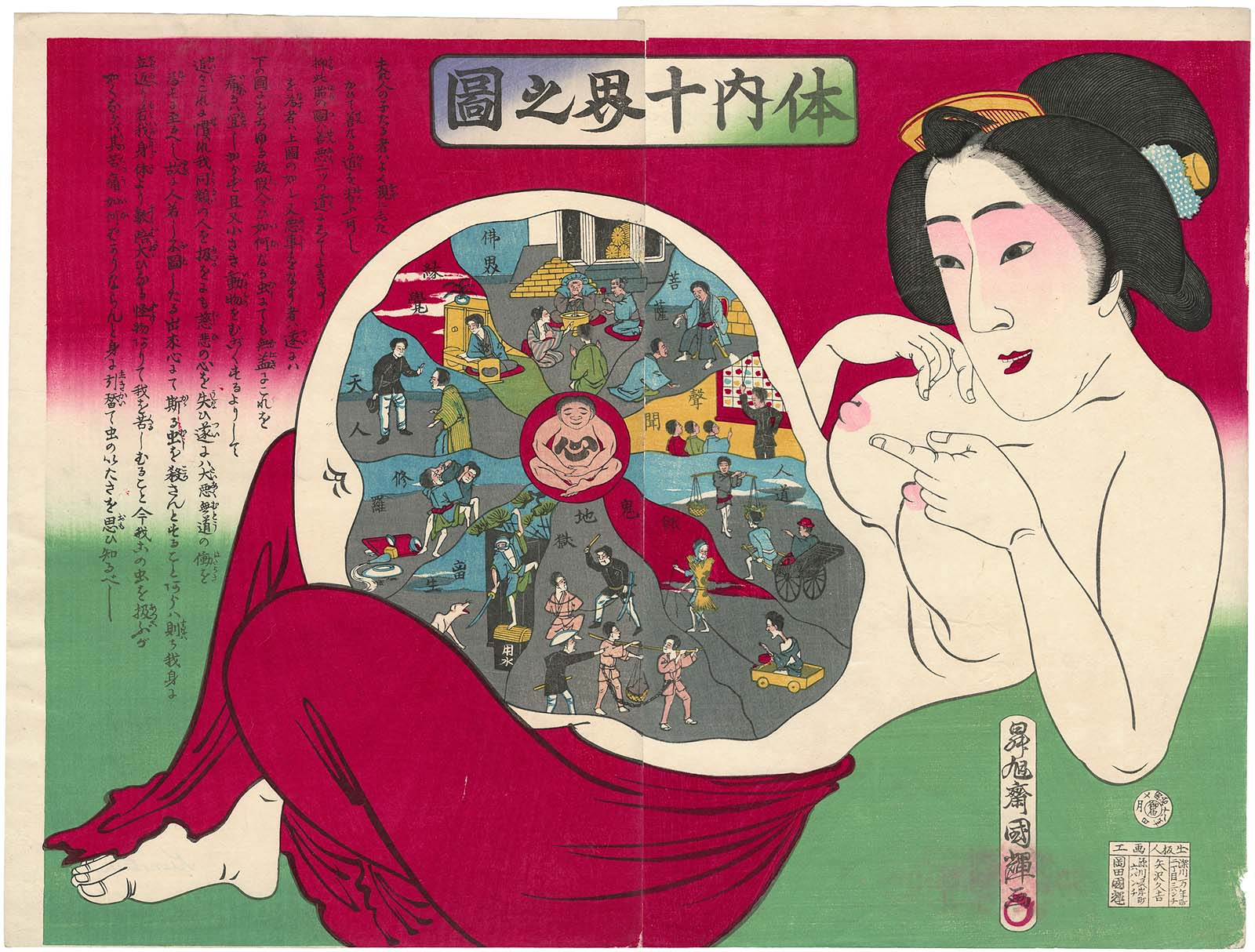
Japanese illustration depicting the mutual inclusion of the ten realms within the mind (xin, 心) of a fetus.

Nichiren stressed the idea that the Buddha's Pure Land is immanent in this present world (shaba soku jakkōdo) and that all beings have the innate potential to attain Buddhahood in this very body (sokushin jōbutsu), though this can only be achieved by relying on the Lotus Sutra. Nichiren was influenced by earlier ideas taught by Kūkai and Saichō, who had taught the possibility of becoming a Buddha in this life and the belief all beings are "originally enlightened" (hongaku).

In the Tendai school, these theories were also closely related to Zhiyi's theory of the "mutual inclusion of the ten Dharma-realms" (jikkai gogu 十界互具), also called Three Thousand Realms in a Single Thought (ichinen sanzen 一念三千), as well as on Zhanran's view of the all-pervasive character of Buddha-nature. As Jacqueline Stone writes "ichinen sanzen means that the smallest phenomenon (a single thought-moment) and the entire cosmos (three thousand realms) are mutually encompassing: the one and the many; good and evil; delusion and awakening; subject and object; self and other; and all sentient beings from hell dwellers, hungry ghosts, and animals up through bodhisattvas and buddhas, as well as their respective environments, simultaneously interpenetrate and encompass one another without losing their individual identity." This realization is itself the wisdom of the Buddha, and the "Wonderful Dharma" (myōhō 妙法) taught by the Lotus Sutra.

Nichiren saw ichinen sanzen as pointing to the potential for Buddhahood in all beings (ri no ichinen sanzen 理の一念三千) and to the actualization of Buddhahood itself (ji no ichinen sanzen 事の一念三千), which encompasses and illuminates all other realms. He associated these with the "trace" teaching of the first half of the Lotus Sutra and with the "origin" teaching of the latter half of the sutra respectively. He also saw ichinen sanzen as the ultimate truth and the heart of the Lotus Sutra, writing that "only the Tiantai ichinen sanzen is the path of attaining Buddhahood." However, he also saw his own teaching of ichinen sanzen as different and as going beyond that which was taught by Zhiyi. This is because Nichiren held that his teaching of the "true ichinen sanzen" was based on the latter half of the Lotus Sutra (the origin teaching), instead of on second chapter. For Nichiren this is "the doctrine of original cause (hon’in) and original effect (honga). The nine realms are inherent in the beginningless Buddha realm; the Buddha realm inheres in the beginningless nine realms." This teaching "demolishes" all views of gradual training.

=== Single-minded devotion to the Lotus Sutra ===
Nichiren held that this teaching of the interfusion of all reality, the ultimate meaning of the Lotus Sutra, could now be realized solely through devotion to the sutra, especially by the practice of faithfully chanting the title of the sutra (daimoku). This allowed one to contemplate one's mind (kanjin) and to attain the fruit of Buddhahood in this life. This was possible because the Lotus Sutra and the daimoku contains the entirety of the Buddha's teachings within it, as well as all of Shakyamuni Buddha's power and merits. This is Nichiren's teaching of ichinen sanzen as "actuality" (ji), meaning a practice that relies on an actual form (jisō), which he contrasted with the teaching of Zhiyi's Mohe Zhiguan which taught ichinen sanzen of "principle" (ri).

According to Nichiren, Buddhahood would manifest when a person faithfully chants the sutra's title and shares it with others, at whatever the cost. Indeed, for Nichiren, Lotus Sutra focused practice was the only efficacious practice in the Final Dharma Age. This is because Nichiren held that the Lotus Sutra contains the true intent of the Buddha:

The Lotus Sutra is the written expression of Śākyamuni Tathāgata’s intent; it is his pure voice transformed into written words. Thus its written words are endowed with the Buddha’s mind. It is like the case of seeds, sprouts, shoots, and grain; though they differ in form, their essence is the same. Śākyamuni Buddha and the words of the Lotus Sutra are different, but their spirit is one. Thus when you look upon the words of the Lotus Sutra, you should think that you are encountering the living Śākyamuni Tathāgata.

Nichiren emphasized the importance of faith, practice, and study. Faith meant embracing the Lotus Sutra, something that needed to be continually deepened. "To accept (ju) [faith in the sutra] is easy," he explained to a follower, "to uphold it (ji) is difficult. But the realization of Buddhahood lies in upholding [faith]." This could only be manifested by the practice of chanting the daimoku as well as teaching others to do the same, and study.

Consequently, Nichiren consistently and vehemently objected to the perspective of the Pure Land School that stressed an other-worldly aspiration to some Pure Land outside of this world. Behind his assertion is the concept of the nonduality of the subjective realm (the individual) and the objective realm (the land that the individual inhabits) which indicates that when the individual taps into Buddhahood, his or her present world becomes peaceful and harmonious. For Nichiren the widespread propagation of the Lotus Sutra and consequent world peace ("kosen-rufu") was achievable and inevitable. He thus tasked his future followers with a mandate to accomplish it.

While Nichiren critiqued Hōnen's Pure Land tradition for sidelining the Lotus Sutra, he was also influenced by it. Hōnen had introduced the concept of focusing on a single practice over all others (which was to be nembutsu). This practice was revolutionary because it was simple and accessible to all. It also minimalized the elitist and monopolistic role of the Buddhist establishment. Nichiren appropriated the structure of a universally accessible single practice but substituted the nembutsu with the recitation of the daimoku (Namu Myōhō Renge Kyō), while also affirming that this practice could lead to Buddhahood in this life, instead of just leading to birth in a Pure Land.

=== The Three Great Secret Dharmas ===
Since Nichiren deemed the world to be in a degenerate age where most teachings were ineffective, he held that people required a simple and effective method to attain Buddhahood. According to Nichiren, the way to Buddhahood was through the Three Great Secret Dharmas (sandai hihō 三大秘法): the invocation of the Lotus Sutra's title (daimoku), the object of worship (honzon), and the ordination platform or place of worship (kaidan). Nichiren held that these three Dharmas are the concrete manifestations of "the actualization of ichinen sanzen" (ji no ichinen sanzen) specific to the Age of Dharma Decline.

A work attributed to Nichiren named the Sandai hi hō honjōji (三大秘法稟承事, Transmission of the Three Great Secret Dharmas) states that Nichiren discovered the three Dharmas in the 16th chapter of the Lotus Sutra, and that as the leader of the Bodhisattvas of the Earth, he secretly received them from the original Buddha (honbutsu) who resides in the originally existing Land of Tranquil Light. Several modern scholars have questioned the authenticity of this text however.

According to Nichiren, practicing the Three Secret Dharmas results in the "Three Proofs" which verify their validity. The first proof is "documentary," whether the religion's fundamental texts, here the writings of Nichiren, make a lucid case for the eminence of the religion. "Theoretical proof" is an intellectual standard of whether a religion's teachings reasonably clarify the mysteries of life and death. "Actual proof," deemed the most important by Nichiren, demonstrates the validity of the teaching through the actual improvements and experiences which manifest in the daily life of practitioners.

==== Daimoku ====
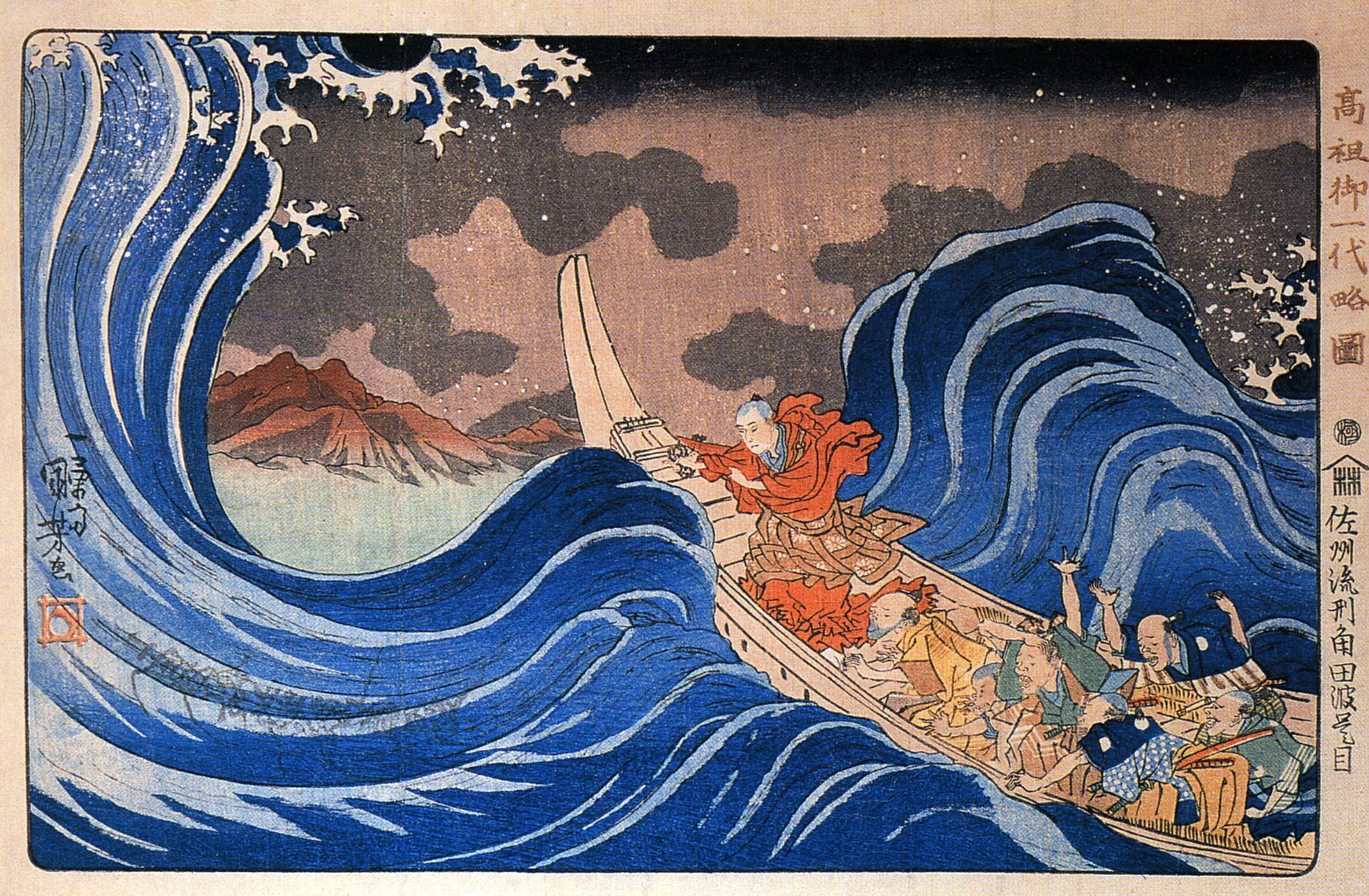
Nichiren depicted calming a storm by chanting the daimoku.

Namu Myōhō Renge Kyō, the daimoku ("the title" of the Lotus Sutra preceded by "Namu", meaning "homage to"), is both the essence of the Lotus Sutra's Dharma and the means to discover that truth, i.e. the interconnected unity of self, others and environment with Buddhahood itself. Nichiren sees this as the only truly effective practice, the superior Buddhist practice for this time. Thus, according to Nichiren, "it is better to be a leper who chants Nam(u) Myōhō Renge Kyō than be a chief abbot of the Tendai school." For Nichiren, the daimoku is "the heart of the eighty thousand sacred teachings and the eye of all buddhas," and contains the entire Buddhadharma.

Nichiren was influenced by Zhiyi, who argued in his Profound Meaning of the Lotus Sūtra (Fahua xuanyi 法華玄義) that the title of the sutra contains the meaning of the entire sutra (which itself contains the whole of Buddhism). Stone writes, "for Nichiren, the daimoku, as the embodiment of ichinen sanzen, encompasses all phenomena, including all beings and their environments in the ten realms of existence." This non-dual reality is contained in the term Myōhō (Miao in Chinese).

Furthermore, the daimoku is also said to contain the Buddha's enlightenment and all his spiritual powers. As he writes in the Kanjin honzon shō: "Śākyamuni’s causal practices and their resulting virtues are all contained within the five characters Myōhō Renge Kyō. When we embrace these five characters, he will naturally transfer to us the merit of his causes and effects." He also writes:

For those who are incapable of understanding the truth of ichinen sanzen, Lord Śākyamuni Buddha, with His great compassion, wraps this jewel in the five characters of myō, hō, ren, ge, and kyō and hangs it around the neck of the ignorant in the Latter Age of Degeneration.

Like other Tendai figures of his time, Nichiren held that the Lotus Sutra taught the unity of the cause (skillful means) and the effect (Buddhahood). Nichiren held that the term Renge (Dharma Flower) represents how the cause and the effect (practice and Buddhahood) are one. This is symbolized by the lotus flower because its blossoms and seed pods grow at the same time.

Thus, the chanting of the daimoku allowed one to access all the merit of the Buddha's practices. It links a practitioner to the Buddha's wisdom which sees all of reality as a single whole and thus allows one to attain the "realization of buddhahood with this very body."

Furthermore, Nichiren saw this practice as going beyong the self-power versus other-power dichotomy used by Pure Land Buddhism:

The Lotus Sutra establishes self-power but is not self-power. Since the "self" encompasses all beings of the ten realms, one’s own person from the outset contains the Buddha realm of both oneself and of all be- ings. Thus one does not now become a Buddha for the first time. [The sutra] also establishes other-power but is not other-power. Since the Buddha who is "other" is contained within us ordinary worldlings, this Buddha naturally manifests himself as identical to ourselves.

For Nichiren, Buddhahood is immanently accessible through the daimoku. Nichiren also saw the daimoku as granting worldly benefits, such as healing and protection from harm. He taught that by relying on the daimoku, one would achieve a state of inner freedom, writing: "Recognize suffering as suffering, enjoy pleasures for what they are, and whether in suffering or joy, keep chanting Namu Myōhō Renge Kyō... Then you will know the joy of the Dharma for yourself."

==== Gohonzon ====
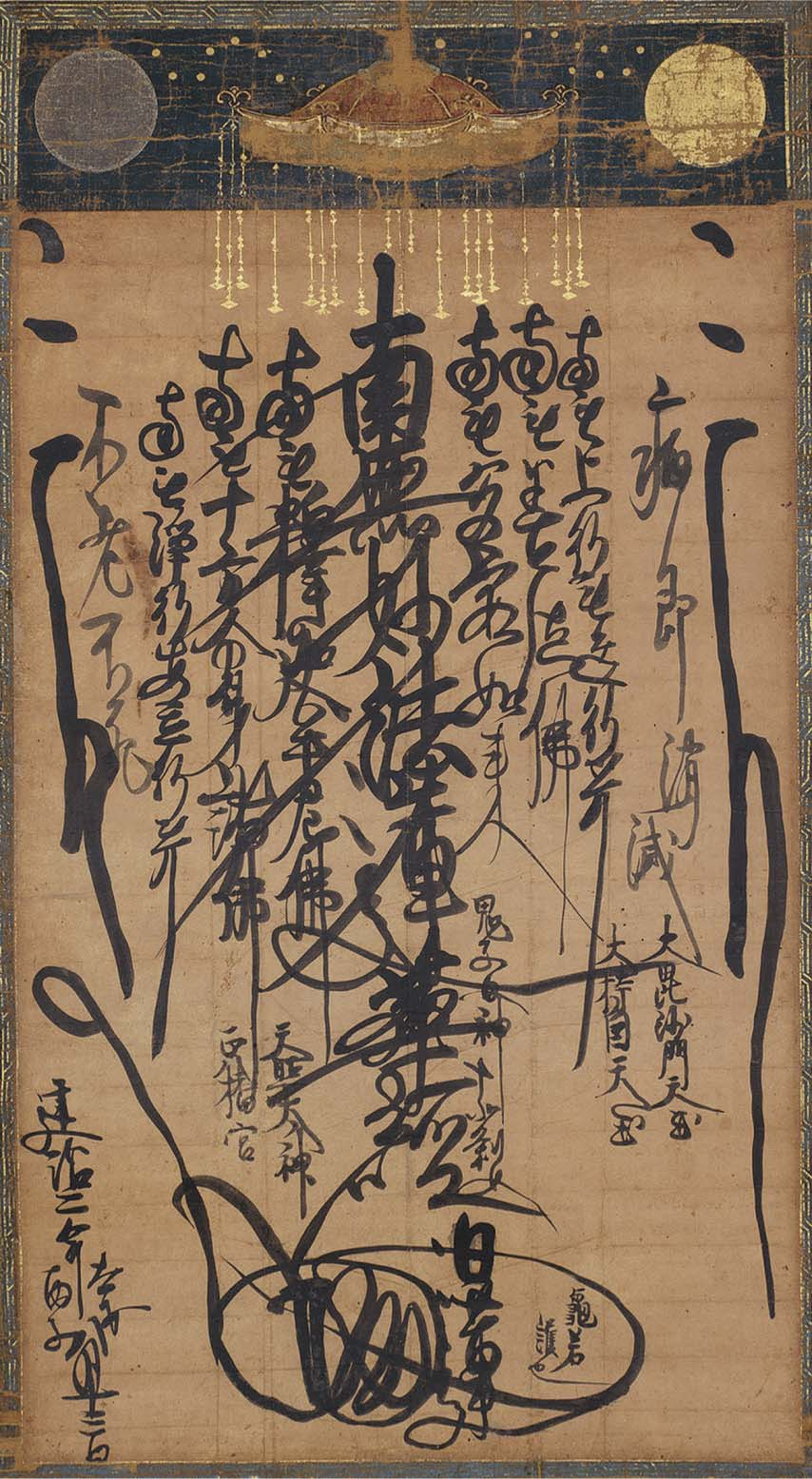
Great Mandala by Nichiren, Honman-ji, Kyoto.

The chanting of the daimoku is to be done while contemplating the daimandara 大曼荼羅 ("great mandala") or gohonzon 御本尊 ("revered object of worship"). Japanese Buddhists often had a personal shrine with an object of worship (honzon), which could be a painting, mandala or statue. These objects were often held to embody the powers of the Buddhas. Nichiren created a unique honzon style in the form of a calligraphic mandala (in Chinese characters and two Siddham glyphs) representing the entire cosmos, specifically centered around the Lotus Sutra's ceremony in the air above Vulture Peak.

Nichiren inscribed many of these mandalas as personal honzons for his followers. More than 120 of them survive in Nichiren's own hand with his signature. Nichiren drew on earlier visual representations of the Lotus Sutra and was also influenced by contemporary figures like Myōe and Shinran who also created calligraphic honzon for their disciples. Since these did not require expert painters or expensive materials to make, they could be made in larger numbers for wide dissemination.

Nichiren's gohonzons contain the daimoku written vertically in the center. It is flanked by the names of Śākyamuni and Prabhūtaratna Buddha, as well as the names of various bodhisattvas (especially prominent being the Four Bodhisattvas of the Earth), deities, and other beings. These figures also represent ichinen sanzen, the mutual inclusion of the ten realms. Thus, the great mandala embodies the entire cosmos and its interfusion with Buddhahood. In other words, the gohonzon symbolizes the non-duality between our world and the sacred realm of the original Buddha of the Lotus Sutra, where the sutra is being taught eternally.

According to Stone, the logic of this mandala is influenced by Esoteric Buddhist yogas, in which the yogi visualizes their unity with the Buddha realm. However, for Nichiren, the unity of oneself and the Buddha is not achieved through yogic means, but mainly through faith. As Stone explains, "by chanting the daimoku, the devotee "enters" the mandala, the realm of the original Buddha’s awakening, and participates in the enlightened reality that it depicts."

==== Kaidan ====
Nichiren discusses the ordination platform (kaidan 戒壇) or place of worship, less frequently than the other great secret Dharmas for the mappō era. Teachings on it can be found in the Sandai hi hō honjōji, a work of questionable authenticity. Traditionally, a kaidan is a place where the Buddhist precepts are transmitted to novices. However, Nichiren held that the merit of the precepts was already contained within the daimoku, and that embracing the Lotus Sutra was the only true precept in the Final Dharma Age. Nichiren's intentions for the establishment of an "ordination platform of the origin teaching" (honmon no kaidan 本門の戒壇) is thus far from clear, though he seems to have held that it would supersede the Tendai ordination platform on Mount Hiei. The Sandai hi hō honjōji teaches that it will be built as great Dharma center for all the people of the world once the Emperor and his government all embraced the Lotus Sutra.

Nichiren left the fulfillment of the kaidan to his successors and its interpretation has been a matter of heated debate. Some state that it refers to the construction of a physical ordination platform sanctioned by the Emperor; others contend that the ordination platform is the community of believers (sangha) or, simply, the place where practitioners of the Lotus Sutra live and make collective efforts to realize the ideal of establishing the true Dharma in order to establish peace to the land (risshō ankoku). The latter metaphorical interpretation is based on the Lotus Sūtra itself which states that "the place of enlightenment" is any place where one upholds the sutra. The latter conception reflects Nichiren's understanding that Buddhist practice must be grounded in a concrete place and must be engaged with the real world outside of temples and hermitages. It has also been interpreted as promoting engagement with the secular world as well as working to improve society.

=== Propagating the Lotus Sutra far and wide ===
Nichiren's teachings are replete with practical aspirations for self-transformation. He urged his followers to "quickly reform the tenets you hold in your heart" (Risshō Ankoku Ron), and to reflect on their behavior as human beings. Nichiren also made a "great vow" that he and all his followers would create the conditions for a peaceful Dharmic nation. This is described in the Lotus Sutra as kosen-rufu (lit. "to extensively declare and spread [the Lotus Sutra] far and wide"). In earlier Japanese Buddhism the concept of "nation" was equated with Imperial rule and peace with political stability. Nichiren's teachings embraced a new view which held that "nation" referred to the land and the people. Nichiren was unique among his contemporaries in charging the actual government in power (the bakufu), as responsible for peace and for the thriving of Dharma. For Nichiren, all human beings were equal in the eyes of the Buddha and all were responsible for the state of their nation. Furthermore, enlightenment is not restricted to one's inner life, but is actualized by making efforts toward the transformation of nation and society.

Because of this, Nichiren saw himself as responsible for saving the Japanese nation, which he believed could only be accomplished by spreading the teaching of the Lotus Sutra. Nichiren saw his struggles to spread the Lotus as reflecting and re-enacting the efforts of the bodhisattvas which appear in the Lotus Sutra, mainly Sadāparibhūta and Viśiṣṭacāritra. He constantly enjoined his followers to continue to spread the teaching of the Lotus and to keep working to create a Pure Land in this world in the future.

=== Polemics and shakubuku ===
The tradition of Buddhist debate has deep-seated roots in the Buddhist tradition, going all the way back to Indian works on debate and Siddhanta texts. In addition to formalized religious debates, the Kamakura period was marked by flourishing and competitive oral religious discourse. Temples competed for the patronage of elites through oratorical sermonizing and temple lecturers (kōshi) faced pressure to attract crowds. Sermonizing spread from within the confines of temples to homes and the streets as wandering mendicants (shidōso, hijiri, or inja) preached to both the educated and illiterate in exchange for alms. In order to teach principles of faith preachers incorporated colorful storytelling, music, vaudeville, and drama—which later evolved into Noh.

A predominant topic of debate in Kamakura Buddhism was the concept of rebuking "slander of the Dharma", a topic found in the Lotus Sutra. Polemical critiques of other sects could be found in the works of numerous Kamakura period authors. Hōnen had taught people to "discard" (捨, sha), "close" (閉, hei), "put aside" (閣, kaku), and "abandon" (抛, hō) all non-Pure Land teachings and his followers often took this to radical extremes. His ideas were vociferously attacked by many authors including Myōe and Jōkei. Thus, Nichiren's critiques of other sects must be understood in the context of a time in which religious polemics were common. Nichiren himself saw countering slander of the Dharma as a key pillar of Buddhist practice.

At age 32, Nichiren began a career of denouncing several Mahayana schools of his time and declaring what he asserted was the correct teaching. The first target of his polemics was Hōnen's Pure Land teaching which had by now become very popular. Nichiren's detailed rationale is most famously articulated in his first major work, the On Establishing the Correct Teaching for the Peace of the Land (立正安国論, Risshō Ankoku Ron). While Nichiren's polemics were often harsh, he always chose personal or written debate and did not resort to religious violence. Nichiren remained non-violent even while experiencing persecution and living in a world in which established sects like the Tendai school wielded armies of warrior monks (Sōhei) to attack their critics. Nichiren is said to have stated: "Whatever obstacles I may encounter, as long as men [persons] of wisdom do not prove my teachings to be false, I will never yield."

For Nichiren, Buddhist texts discuss to main approaches to spreading the Buddhadharma: the gradual method of shōju (摂 受) in which one leads others without confronting or challenging them, and shakubuku (折伏), an assertive method of critiquing others' views. Nichiren held that depending on the time and place, one could use either of these. Nichiren believed that since Japan was a Buddhist country that had entered the Final Dharma Age in which people were discarding the Lotus Sutra, it was necessary to make use of confrontational shakubuku when encountering certain people. Nichiren saw his critiques as a compassionate act, since he was convinced only the Lotus could lead to liberation in this age. Even if people rejected his teachings, Nichiren held that hearing about the Lotus Sutra would plant a seed in their minds which would sprout in the future. However, he also acknowledged that in some cases, one should also rely on shōju, even during this time. One example was when teaching in a non-buddhist country. This flexibility opened the way for later controversy in the Nichiren tradition, which has often been divided over which approach to employ.

==== The Four Denunciations ====
Throughout his career Nichiren harshly denounced various Buddhist traditions, as well as the existing social and political system that supported them. Modern detractors criticize his exclusivist perspective as intolerant. Apologists argue his arguments should be understood in the context of his times and not through a modern lens that rejects religious confrontation.

Nichiren's polemics included sharp criticisms of the Pure Land, Shingon (meaning Esoteric Buddhism in general), Zen, and Ritsu schools. The core of Nichiren's critique was that these schools had turned people away from the Lotus Sutra, making them focus on other thing like a postmortem destination (Pure Land), secret and elitist master disciple transmissions (Zen, and Esotericism) and monastic rules (Ritsu). His criticisms have become known as the "Four Denunciations". He also critiqued the Japanese Tendai school for its appropriation of esoteric elements (Taimitsu). Reliance on esoteric rituals, he claimed, was useless magic and would lead to national decay. He held that Zen was devilish in its belief that attaining enlightenment was possible through a "secret transmission outside the scriptures", and that Ritsu was thievery because it hid behind token deeds such as public works. In modern parlance, the Four Denunciations rebuked demoralized and disengaged people by discouraging occultism, clericalism, legalism, and escapism.

In spite of his critiques, Nichiren did not reject all other Buddhist traditions or practices in full. His focus remained on those whom he saw as "slandering the Dharma", i.e. those who turned people away from the Lotus Sutra or argued that it was a sutra of a lower class. Thus, he writes in The Opening of the Eyes:

I believe that the devotees and followers of the Flower Garland, Meditation, Mahāvairochana, and other sutras will undoubtedly be protected by the Buddhas, bodhisattvas, and heavenly beings of the respective sutras that they uphold. But if the votaries of the Mahāvairochana, Meditation, and other sutras should set themselves up as the enemies of the votary of the Lotus Sutra, then the Buddhas, bodhisattvas, and heavenly beings will abandon them and will protect the votary of the Lotus Sutra. It is like the case of a filial son whose father opposes the ruler of the kingdom. The son will abandon his father and support the ruler, for to do so is the height of filial piety.

=== Bodily reading the Lotus Sutra ===
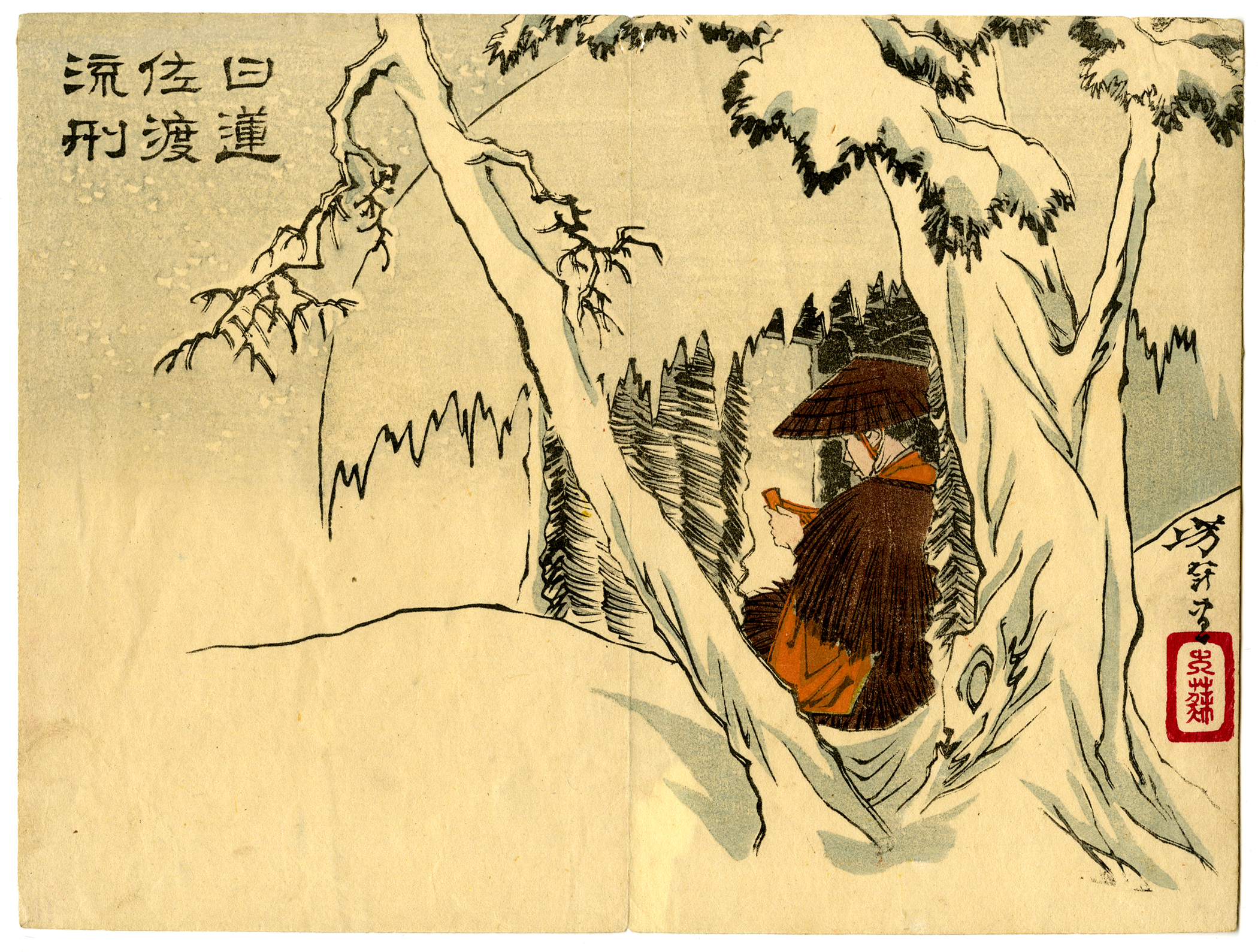
Nichiren in exile on Sado. Nichiren believed that the sufferings of exile allowed him to live and practice the Lotus Sutra every moment of every day with his very body.

Nichiren's combative preaching led to many attacks and persecutions against him and his followers. Nichiren saw these attacks as signifying his role as a "votary of the Lotus Sutra" (法華経の行者, Hokekyō no gyōja), one who bears witness to the truth of the sutra through their own life and is thus assured of enlightenment. The Lotus Sutra states that those who base themselves on its teachings and attempt to spread it will experience many trials and personal attacks. By persevering in this, they will eventually reach Buddhahood. Nichiren claimed to be "reading [the Lotus Sutra] with his body" (shikidoku 色読), that is directly and physically experiencing the words of the sutra instead of just reciting or thinking about it. Stone writes that this process entails a circular hermeneutic in which "the sūtra’s predictions that its devotees will encounter hardships legitimated Nichiren’s actions, and Nichiren’s experience of persecution, in fulfilling scriptural prophecy, legitimated the Lotus Sūtra."

Nichiren saw it as his personal mission to actively face these trials, and claimed he found great meaning and joy in them. He even expressed appreciation to his tormentors for giving him the opportunity to serve as an envoy of the Buddha. Furthermore, for Nichiren, experiencing trials and even death in service to the Lotus Sutra was also a way to attain Buddhahood. This practice of "bodily reading" the sutra and "not begrudging bodily life" is one of the most central elements of Nichiren's soteriology. Nichiren found this teaching in the Lotus Sutra's statement "we do not value bodily life, but cherish only the unexcelled way."

Nichiren also saw his sufferings as redemptive opportunities to quickly transform his karma and repay his debts to the triple gem, to one's parents, nation, and to all of beings. He further held that encountering great trials for the sake of the Lotus guaranteed one's future Buddhahood, and he compared this to the radical acts of self-sacrifice found in the Mahayana sutras. His personal example has provided enduring encouragement to Nichiren Buddhists as well as to other individuals who have risked their lives to uphold their convictions.

Nichiren was well aware of the struggles his followers faced in their lives. He taught them that facing these challenges would lead to a sense of inner freedom, peace of mind, and to an understanding of the Dharma. Nichiren accepted the classic Buddhist views on karma which taught that a person's current conditions were the cumulative effect of past thoughts, words, and actions. However, he preferred to focus on how all people, even the ignorant, poor and evil, could become Buddhas through devotion to the Lotus Sutra. Nichiren thus taught that when confronting difficult karmic situations, chanting of the daimoku would open the wisdom of the Buddha and transform one's karma, awakening a universal concern for one's society. In some of his letters, Nichiren extended his theory of facing persecution for the Lotus Sutra to personal problems like familial discord or illness. He encouraged his followers to take ownership of negative life events, and to view them as opportunities to repay karmic debts and to practice Dharma, which help could shorten the length of these events.

For Nichiren, finding joy in experiencing the Lotus Sutra through one's personal life experience was of paramount in importance. Nichiren held that peace of mind in the face of life's challenges is precisely what the Lotus Sutra meant by its statement that those to uphold the sutra will have peace and security. According to Stone, Nichiren "demonstrated an attitude that wastes little energy in railing against it but unflinchingly embraces it, interpreting it in whatever way appears meaningful at the moment so as to use that suffering for one's own development and to offer it on behalf of others."

=== The non-dual Lotus Land ===
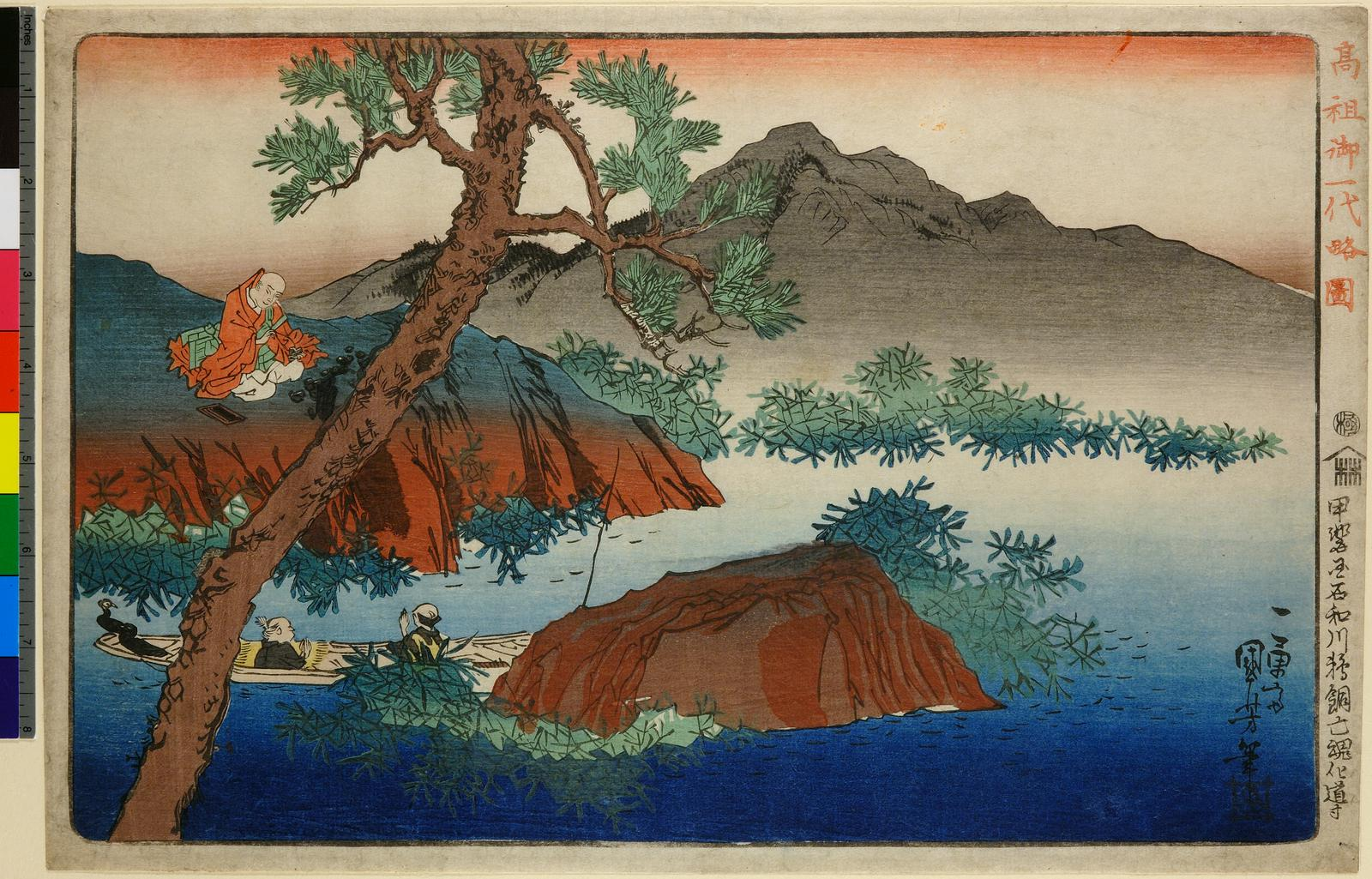
Nichiren chanting for fishermen at Ishiwa River, by Utagawa Kuniyoshi (歌川国芳).

Nichiren defends a profound nonduality between subjective existence and the surrounding world, the non-separation of subjective experience and environmental karmic effects (eshō funi, 依正不二). According to this doctrine, the environment reflects the inner life-condition of the sentient beings who inhabit it. Thus, the same world appears differently to individuals based on their state of mind: a person in a state of hellish suffering experiences a hell-like world, while an awakened being experiences a Pure Land. This teaching was not limited to internal realization; it implied that sincere Buddhist practice would directly affect the external world. Because each of the Ten Realms interpenetrates and includes both sentient beings and their environments, the act of actualizing Buddhahood within oneself simultaneously actualizes Buddhahood in one’s surroundings. As more individuals engage in the chanting practice, the transformation would extend outward, gradually turning this world into an ideal Buddha-field.

Nichiren envisioned this transformed world as a tangible outcome of faith and practice, though he rarely detailed its specific characteristics. However, in one writing, he claims that if everyone chanted in unison, natural disasters would cease, social harmony would prevail, and people would gain long lives. This suggests that through faith in the Lotus Sutra, a society in alignment with nature and moral governance could be established. This vision imbues Nichiren’s doctrine with a clear social dimension: the realization of the Pure Land is not solely an individual spiritual goal but a communal one. His followers across history have pursued this aim in various forms, inspired by the belief that practice can reform society. Nichiren's this-worldly orientation stands in contrast to the Pure Land Buddhism ideal prevalent in his time, which encouraged rejection of this impure world in favor of rebirth in a transcendent land after death.

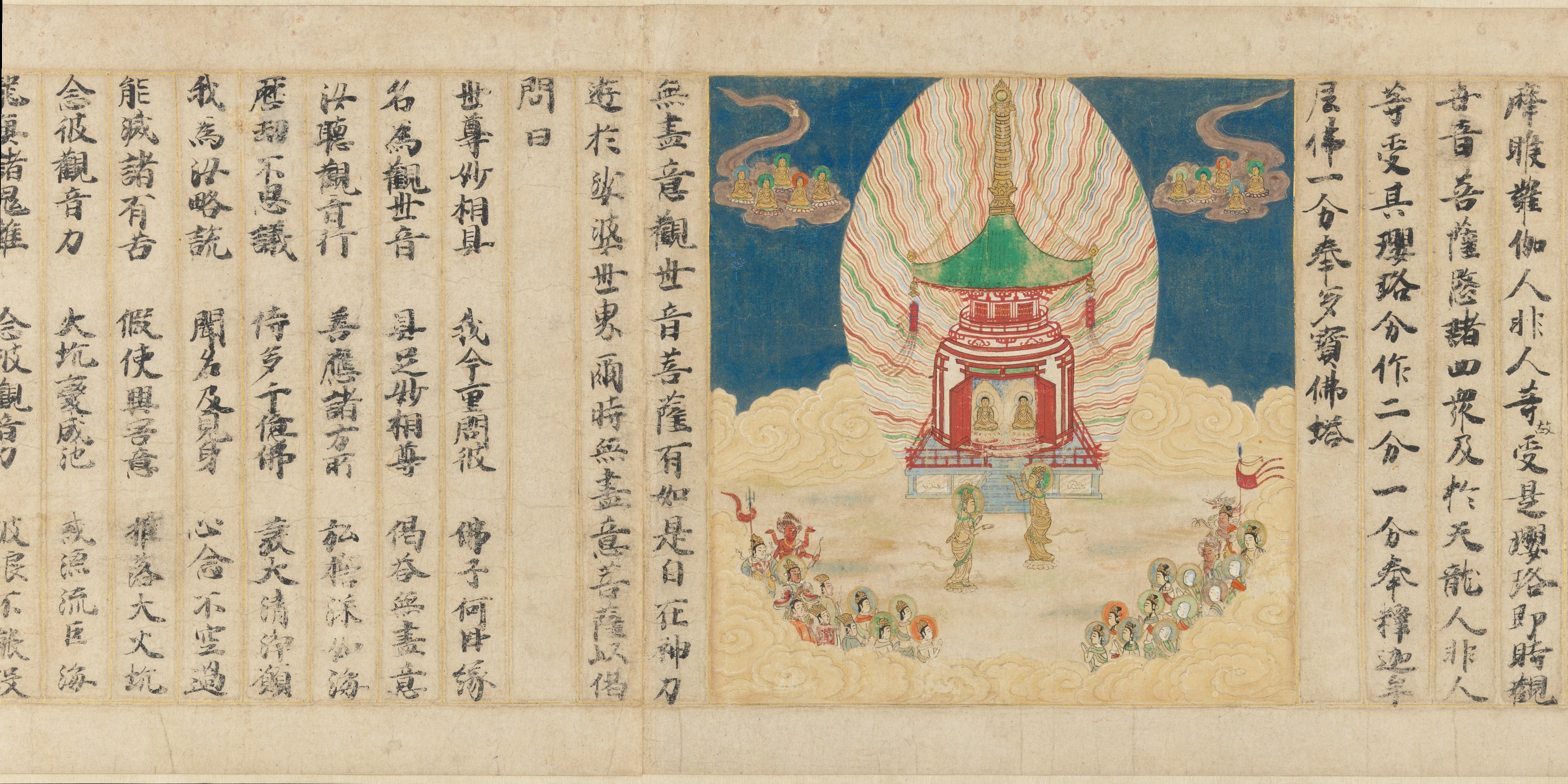
The Assembly in Space Above Vulture Peak; from an illustrated Lotus Sutra, c. 1257.

In his later years, Nichiren did address the question of the devotee’s destiny after death. He taught that anyone who embraced the Lotus Sutra and had faith in it would enter the "Pure Land of Vulture Peak" (Ryōzen jōdō, 霊山浄土), associated with the Lotus Sutra's assembly in the air. This provided a peaceful postmortem destination for Nichiren's followers, analogous to the pure land of Sukhavati. However, Nichiren did not regard this Pure Land as realm separate from this world. Even though it encompasses the faithful deceased, this land is ultimately the sacred space of enlightenment accessible here and now through devotion to the Lotus Sūtra. It is thus the "land of tranquil light" (jō jakkōdo), the highest Pure Land in the Tendai system. For Nichiren, the boundary between the mundane and the sacred collapses in the moment of embracing the Lotus. By chanting Namu Myōhō Renge Kyō, "gains entrance by faith" into the Buddha's presence, participating in the "eternal assembly in open space" (kokūe no gishiki) of the Lotus Sutra, where Shakyamuni and Many Jewels Buddha teach from the Jeweled Stupa.

Thus, Nichiren says in his Kanjin no Honzon-shō:

The sahā world of the present moment (ima), which is the original time (honji) [of the Buddha’s enlightenment], is the constantly abiding pure land, liberated from the three disasters and beyond [the cycle of] the four kalpas [formation, stability, decline and extinction]. Its Buddha has not already entered nirvāṇa in the past, nor is he yet to be born in the future. And his disciples are of the same essence. This [world] is [implicit in] the three realms, which are inherent in the three thousand realms of one’s mind.

Thus, through faith and the daimoku, one can enter the Pure Land in this life, which is equivalent to "attaining buddhahood in this body" (sokushin jōbutsu). Therefore, unlike with the Pure Land teaching of Sukhavati, Nichiren's idea of the Pure Land is not a world outside of Saṃsāra and does not require one to loathe this defiled world and seek to escape it. Nichiren writes:

The originally enlightened Buddha of the perfect teaching abides in this world. If one abandons this land, toward what other land should one aspire? . . . The practitioner who believes in the Lotus and Nirvana sutras should not seek another place, for wherever one has faith in this sutra is precisely the pure land. . . . . For people of our day, who have not yet formed a bond with the Lotus Sutra, to aspire to the Western Pure Land is to aspire to a land of rubble.

=== Equality ===
Nichiren taught that all beings had the same capacity to attain Buddhahood. He held that the Lotus Sutra teaches the equality of all beings. He also taught that neither social class nor gender were barriers to one's Buddhahood. This view was rare in Japan, which was a society dominated by elite men. Women were not even allowed on Mount Hiei for example, and were traditionally considered to be impure during menstruation. Nichiren emphasized that women are equal in their spiritual capacity:

Many women in their prime became nuns during Shakyamuni's time and practiced the way of the Buddha, but they were never despised because of their menstrual periods. Menstruation is not a pollution that comes from without. It is simply a feminine characteristic...

== Nichiren and his followers ==
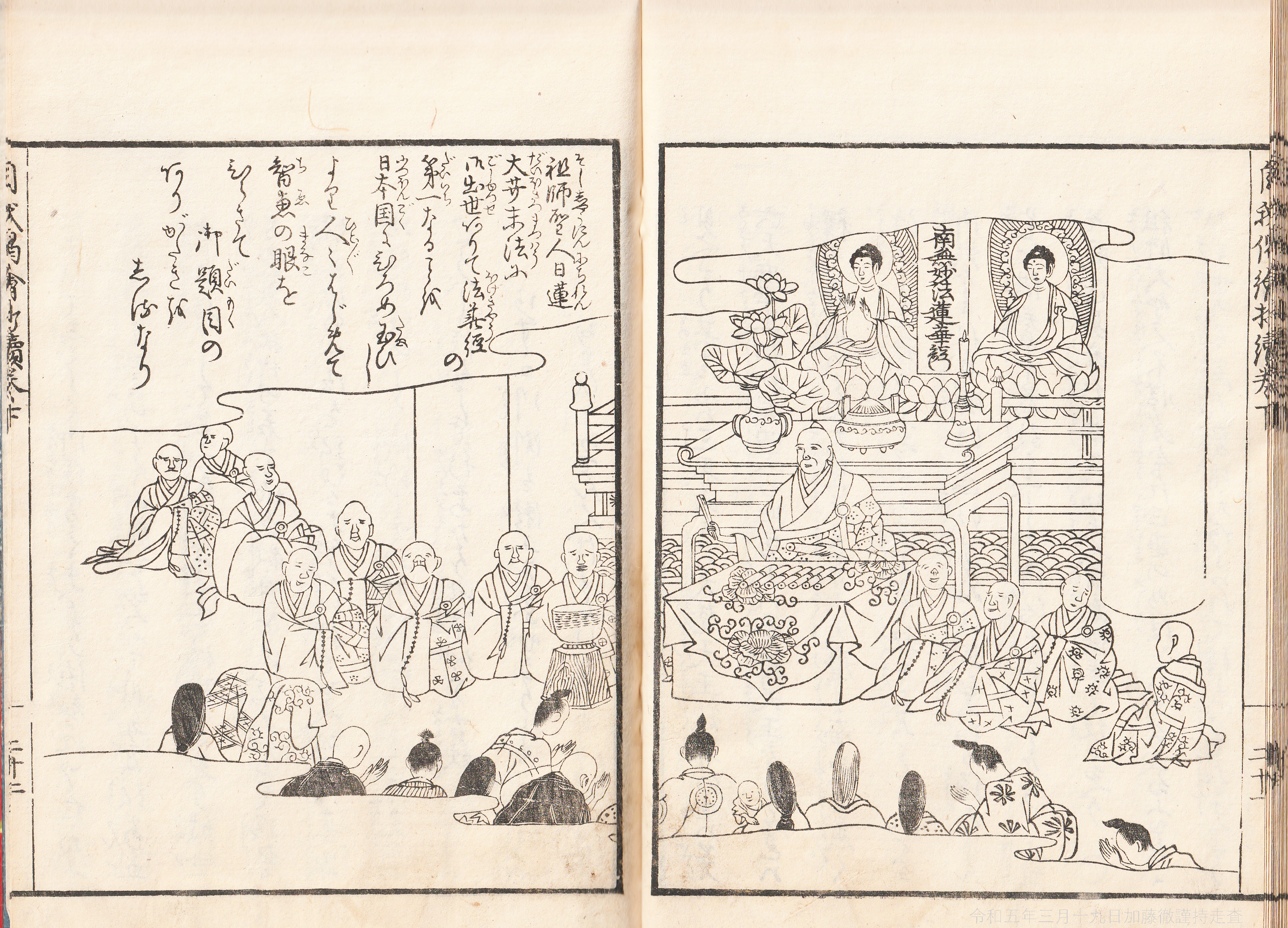
Nichiren in his later years and his disciples. From the book JIGAGE E SHŌ ZOKUHEN (1818, Kyoto).

Nichiren was a charismatic leader who attracted many followers during both his missionary trips and his exiles. They included samurai, feudal lords, commoners and merchants, men and women. He taught his followers that women were equally able to attain enlightenment. He wrote to them often, sharing his rationale and strategies with them, openly urging them to share his conviction and struggles.

Nichiren's many extant letters demonstrate the scope and breadth of his relationship with them and his expectations for them. They recognized and trusted his charismatic leadership and his understanding of Buddhism. Many sought his guidance to overcome personal problems. Many were actively involved with supporting him financially and protecting his community of followers. Several of disciples were praised by him for sharing in his privations and a few lost their lives in these situations. The relationship between Nichiren and his disciples has been called shitei funi, the oneness of mentor and disciple. Although the functions of the mentor and disciple may vary, they share the same goals and the same responsibility. Nichiren claimed the precedent for shitei funi is a core theme of the Lotus Sutra, especially in chapters 21 and 22 where the Buddha entrusts the future propagation of the sutra to the gathered bodhisattvas.

== Posthumous influence ==
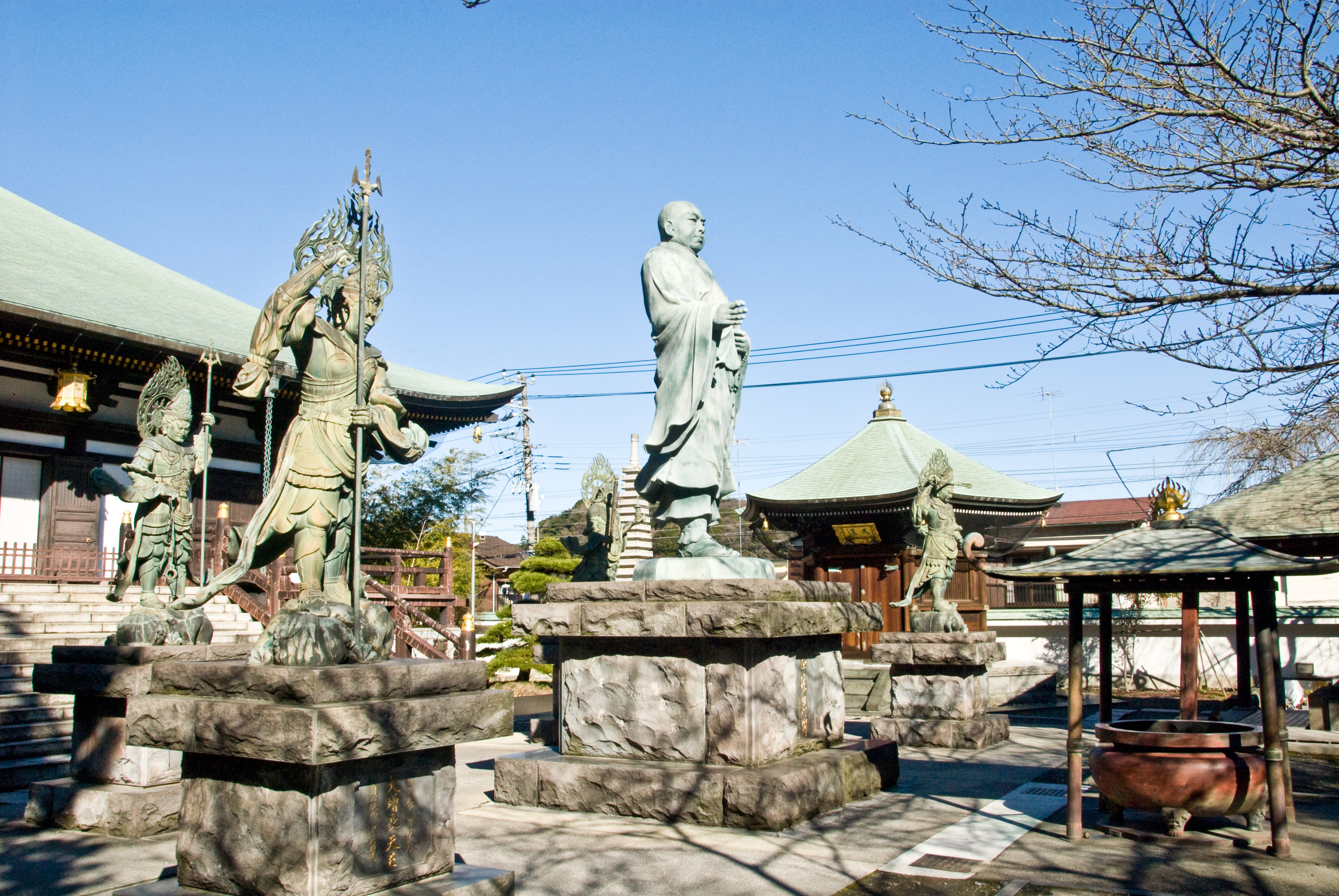
The statue of Nichiren at Chōshō-ji in Kamakura

In the centuries after his death, the Nichiren movement experienced many internal divisions and further persecutions. Nevertheless, Nichiren's Lotus (Hokke) tradition grew steadily and maintained Nichiren's teachings. In the years after his death, Nichiren's teachings were interpreted in different ways by his followers. As a result, Nichiren Buddhism encompasses several major branches and schools, each with its own doctrine and set of interpretations of Nichiren's teachings. Today his followers are found in influential lay movements as well as traditional Nichiren schools like Nichiren-shū and Nichiren Shōshū. With an estimated 10 millions followers, modern Nichiren Buddhism is the second largest tradition of Japanese Buddhism (second only to Pure Land Buddhism with 22 million followers).

A massive body of scholarship on Nichiren has been written in Japanese. This includes sectarian and academic works. The Institute of Nichiren Buddhist Studies at Risshō University (Risshō Daigaku Nichiren Kyōgaku Kenkyūjo 立正大 学日蓮教学硏究所) is a major Japanese institution which focuses on Nichiren studies. It is affiliated with Nichiren-shū. Nichiren has drawn less attention from Western scholars than other Japanese Buddhist figures, and he was initially stereotyped as intolerant or militant. Nevertheless, scholars like Gaston Renondeau, Alicia Matsunaga, Daigan Matsunaga, Bruno Petzold, Lucia Dolce and Jacqueline Stone have written in English on Nichiren.

== Writings ==
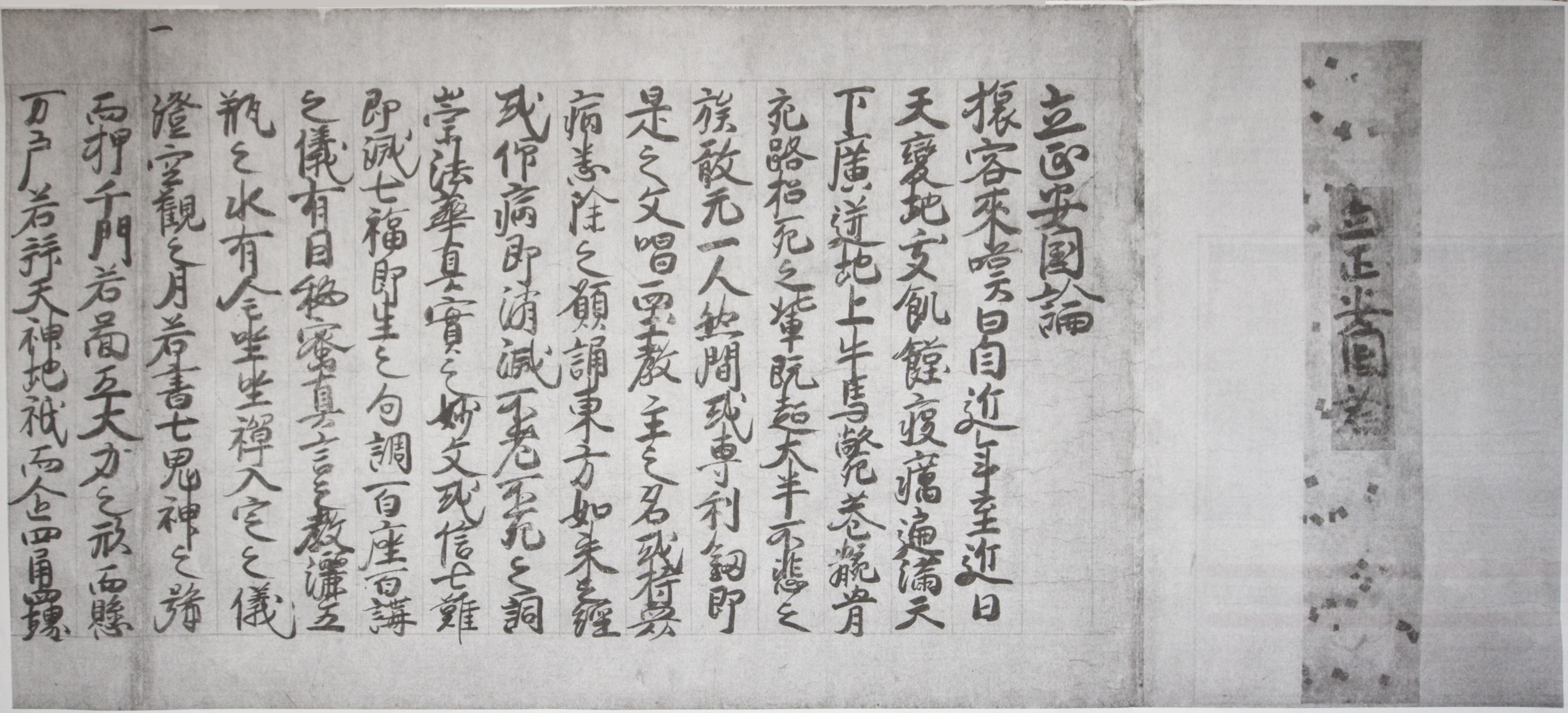
A section of Nichiren's treatise Risshō Ankoku Ron (On Establishing the Correct Teaching for the Peace of the Land)

Nichiren was a prolific writer. His collected works in four volumes contains up to five hundred writings. Nichiren also kept a copy of the Lotus Sūtra which he annotated profusely and has also been published. Many writings still exist in his original handwriting, some as complete works and some as fragments. Other documents survive as copies made by his immediate disciples. Nichiren's existing works number over 700 manuscripts in total, including transcriptions of orally delivered lectures, letters of remonstration and illustrations. According to Fumihiko Sueki: "the most rigorously edited and reliable collection of Nichiren’s writings is the Shōwa teihon Nichiren Shōnin ibun 昭和定本日蓮聖人遺文 (STN), edited and published after World War II by Risshō Daigaku Nichiren Kyōgaku Kenkyūjo (1988)."

Scholars have divided the writings attributed to Nichiren into three categories: those whose authenticity are universally accepted, those generally designated as written by someone else after his death, and a third category in which the veracity of works is still being debated.

In addition to treatises written in formal Classical Chinese (漢文, kanbun), Nichiren also wrote expositories and letters to followers in mixed kanji-kana vernacular as well as letters in simplified kana for believers such as children who could not read the more formal styles. Some of Nichiren's kanbun works, especially the Risshō Ankoku Ron, are considered exemplary of the kanbun style, while many of his letters focus on more empathic exhortations to commoners and laypeople.

=== Selected important writings ===
Among his main Classical Chinese treatises, five are generally accepted by all Nichiren schools as his major works:

- On Securing the Peace of the Land through the Propagation of True Buddhism (Rissho Ankoku Ron) — written between 1258 and 1260.
- The Opening of the Eyes (Kaimoku-sho) — written in 1272.
- The True Object of Worship (Kanjin-no Honzon-sho) — written in 1273.
- The Selection of the Time (Senji-sho) — written in 1275.
- On Repaying Debts of Gratitude (Ho'on-sho) — written in 1276.

Nikkō Shōnin added an additional five writings to comprise a set of ten major writings (this specific list is only central in Nichiren Shōshū).

- On Chanting the Daimoku of the Lotus Sutra (Sho-hokke Daimoku-sho) — written in 1260.
- On Taking the Essence of the Lotus Sutra (Hokke Shuyo-sho) — written in 1274.
- On the Four Stages of Faith and the Five Stages of Practice (Shishin Gohon-sho) — written in 1277.
- Letter to Shimoyama (Shimoyama Gosho-soku) — written in 1277.
- Questions and Answers on the Object of Worship (Honzon Mondo-sho) — written in 1278.

=== Personal letters ===
Among the collection of his extant writings are numerous letters to his follows in the form of thank you notes, messages of condolence, responses to questions, and spiritual counseling for trying moments in his followers' lives. Collectively these letters demonstrate that Nichiren was a master of providing both comfort and challenge befitting the unique personalities and situations of each individual.

Many of these letters use tales drawn from Indian, Chinese, and Japanese traditions as well as historical anecdotes and stories from the Buddhist canon. Nichiren incorporated several hundred of these anecdotes and took liberty to freely embellish some of them; a few of the stories he provided do not appear in other collections and could be original.

Another category of his letters follow the genres of Japanese zuihitsu, lyrical and loosely organized essays that combine personal reflection and poetic language, or personal diaries (nikki bungaku). Nichiren was a master of this genre and these colloquial works reveal his highly personal and charismatic method of proselytization as well as his deep caring for his followers.

Nichiren used his letters as a means to inspire key supporters. About one hundred followers are identified as recipients and several received between 5 and 20 of them. The recipients tended to be of the warrior class and only scattered references appear about his lower status followers, many of whom were illiterate. The series of letters he wrote his followers during the "Atsuhara Affair" of 1279 provide a case study of how he used personal written communications to direct a response to the government's actions and to keep his followers steadfast during the ordeal.

=== Writings to women ===
Against a backdrop of earlier Buddhist teachings that deny the possibility of enlightenment to women or reserve that possibility for life after death, Nichiren is highly sympathetic to women. Based on various passages from the Lotus Sutra, Nichiren asserts that "Other sutras are written for men only. This sutra is for everyone."

Ninety of his extant letters, nearly a fifth of the total, were addressed to female correspondents. Nichiren Shu has published separate volumes with those writings. In these letters Nichiren plays particular attention to the instantaneous attainment of enlightenment of the Dragon King's daughter in the "Devadatta" (Twelfth) chapter of the Lotus Sutra and displays deep concern for the fears and worries of his female disciples.

=== Disputed writings ===
There is a lively scholarly debate as to the authenticity of many writings attributed to Nichiren. Such disputed works include the Sandai hihō honjōji and the Ongi kuden. Some Japanese scholars initially questioned whether any work which contained hongaku thought could be Nichiren's. These include important writings sent to the Tendai monk Sairen-bo which also show some stylistic differences to other writings by Nichiren. More recent scholarship by authors like Jacqueline Stone have argued that this single criterion is not enough for rejecting a work's authenticity. Thus, according to Sueki, the authenticity of the Risshōkan jō (Treatise on right contemplation) is highly probable. In 1997, Ito Zuiei used computer analysis to study the Sandai hihō honjōji and argued that it is possibly authentic. Thus, the scholarship on Nichiren's "problematic" works is still up for debate and continues to change.

== See also ==
- Masaichi Nagata - Daiei Film president who was also a devoted Buddhist and was an influential figure in Nichiren-shū, and produced Nichiren to Mōko Daishūrai (1958) and Nichiren (1979) as tributes to Nichiren by appointing a number of worshippers of Nichiren-shū as extras.
- Nichiren Buddhism

== Bibliography ==
- Causton, Richard (1985). Buddha in Daily Life: An Introduction to the Buddhism of Nichiren. Random House.
- Christensen, J. A. (2000). Nichiren. Fremont, CA: Jain Publishing Co. ISBN 978-0-87573-086-8.
- Harvey, Peter (1992). An Introduction to Buddhism: Teachings, History and Practices (Repr. ed.). Cambridge [u.a.]: Cambridge Univ. Press. ISBN 978-0-521-31333-9.
- Ikeda, Daisaku (July 2013). The Opening of the Eyes: Commentaries on the Writings of Nichiren. Newick. ISBN 978-1-938252-34-1. OCLC 1063697629.
- Ikeda, Daisaku (2013). Learning from Nichiren's Writings: The Teachings for Victory. Santa Monica, CA. ISBN 978-1-938252-43-3. OCLC 867769732.
- Montgomery, Daniel B. (1991). Fire in the Lotus: The Dynamic Buddhism of Nichiren. London: Dai Gohonzon. ISBN 978-1-85274-091-7.
- Murakami, Masahiko (2015). Nichiren (graphic novel). Tanaka, Ken. Santa Monica, CA: Middleway Press. ISBN 978-0-9779245-7-8. OCLC 893709935.
- Nichiren Shoshu International Center (1983). A Dictionary of Buddhist Terms and Concepts (1st ed.). Tokyo: Nichiren Shoshu International Center. ISBN 978-4-88872-014-4.
- Stone, Jacqueline Ilyse (1 May 2003). Original Enlightenment and the Transformation of Medieval Japanese Buddhism. University of Hawaii Press. ISBN 978-0-8248-2771-7.
- Tamura, Yoshiro (2000). Japanese Buddhism: A Cultural History (1st English ed.). Tokyo: Kosei Publ. ISBN 978-4-333-01684-6.
- Tanabe, George, ed. (2002). Writings of Nichiren. Tokyo: Nichiren Shū Overseas Propagation Promotion Association. ISBN 978-0-8248-2551-5.
- The English Buddhist Dictionary Committee (2002). The Soka Gakkai Dictionary of Buddhism., Tokyo, Soka Gakkai, ISBN 4-412-01205-0.

== English translations of Nichiren's writings ==
One recent translation collection of Nichiren's work appears is the work of Nichirenshū Overseas Propagation Promotion Association (NOPPA) and is published by Nichiren Buddhist International Center. Now in its second edition, it was published in 2021 and contains seven volumes:

- Writings of Nichiren Shōnin, Doctrine I (Vol. 1)
- Writings of Nichiren Shōnin, Doctrine II (Vol. 2)
- Writings of Nichiren Shōnin, Doctrine III (Vol. 3)
- Writings of Nichiren Shōnin, Faith and Practice (Vol. 4)
- Writings of Nichiren Shōnin, Biography and Disciples (Vol. 5)
- Writings of Nichiren Shōnin, Followers I (Vol. 6)
- Writings of Nichiren Shōnin, Followers II (Vol. 7)

Other translations of Nichiren's work into English include:

- The Major Writings of Nichiren. Soka Gakkai, Tokyo, 1999.
- Heisei Shimpen Dai-Nichiren Gosho (平成新編 大日蓮御書: "Heisei new compilation of Nichiren's writings"), Taisekiji, 1994.
- The Writings of Nichiren, Volume I & II, Burton Watson and the Gosho Translation Committee. Soka Gakkai, 2006, ISBN 4-412-01024-4.
- Writings of Nichiren, Chicago, Middleway Press, 2013, The Opening of the Eyes.
- Letters of Nichiren, Burton Watson et al., trans.; Philip B. Yampolsky, ed. Columbia University Press, 1996 ISBN 0-231-10384-0.
- Selected Writings of Nichiren, Burton Watson et al., trans.; Philip B. Yampolsky, ed. Columbia University, Press, 1990,ISBN 0-231-07260-0.
