= Kosen-rufu =

Phrase in the Japanese translation of the Lotus Sutra

Kōsen-rufu (広宣流布), a phrase found in the Japanese translation of the Buddhist scripture Lotus Sutra which is important in Nichiren Buddhism and refers to the future widespread dissemination of the Lotus Sutra. The term can be translated as “to extensively proclaim and cause [the teaching] to flow and be disseminated” or “to extensively declare and propagate [the sutra] far and wide.”

The term derives from Lotus Sutra's 22nd chapter: "Propagate this chapter widely throughout the Jambudvīpa in the last 500-year period after my death." Nichiren (1222–1282), the founder of Nichiren Buddhism, took this statement to indicate that the Lotus Sutra is the Law to be declared and widely spread during the Latter Age.

Kōsen means to "widely declare." "Widely" implies speaking out to the world, to an ever-greater number and ever-broader spectrum of people. "Declare" means to proclaim one's ideals, principles and philosophy. The ru (flow) of rufu means "a current like that of a great river," and fu (cloth) means "to spread out like a bolt of cloth." This requires an active and engaged approach of shakubuku, propagation of the Dharma, rather than peaceful retreat or meditative solitude.

In Soka Gakkai, Kosen rufu is informally defined as "world peace through individual happiness."

== Kosen-rufu as peacemaking ==
Literally, kōsen-rufu means to declare and spread widely the teachings of the Buddha. However, the term "kosen rufu" has come to connote "world peace" based on the Lotus Sutra and Nichiren teachings. The Soka Gakkai, Risshō Kōsei Kai, and Nipponzan-Myōhōji are Nichiren-inspired new religious movements headquartered in Japan that have incorporated peace activities into their religious practice. All three of these groups have some form of NGO status.

According to the Soka Gakkai and Nipponzan-Myōhōji, Nichiren stressed the ideal of achieving kōsen-rufu in Buddhist practice because he felt that the quests for personal enlightenment and the peace and well-being of the entire society were inseparable.

Both the Soka Gakkai and Rissho Koseikai hold that peacemaking and social improvement require inner personal transformation. The Soka Gakkai labels this as "human revolution" (ningen kakumei) and Risso Koseikai calls it "reformation of the mind" (kokoro no kaizō). Both groups reason that since war, strife, and injustice are rooted in the three poisons of greed, anger, and delusion existing in the minds of individuals, the creation of lasting peace requires individual self-purification taken on by many people. From their perspective of "Buddhism is daily life," activities at home, school or the workplace become part of the Buddhist practice, opportunities for growth and are means to demonstrate the validity of the Lotus Sutra.

=== Soka Gakkai ===
The largest of the three socially engaged Nichiren groups is the Soka Gakkai. Since the start of its postwar history it has equated its propagation efforts with a quest to contribute to peacemaking. Its members meet in local community small discussion groups called zadankai. Member identification with the organization's goals is strengthened through activities organized around age, gender, and professional interests. In addition it is active in nuclear arms abolition, support for the United Nations, and engagement with like-minded religionists.

=== Risshō Kōsei Kai ===
The second largest of these groups is the Risshō Kōsei Kai. It sponsors peacemaking through peace activism, ecumenical, and anti-poverty activities. In addition to its global footprint its members meet locally in "Dharma circles" (hōza) for problem-solving counseling based on the group's teachings. It also solidifies membership identification through activities organized by age, gender, and professional interests.

=== Nipponzan-Myōhōji ===
Nipponzan-Myōhōji, with a membership of fewer than 1500 clerics and lay members, is the smallest of the three socially engaged Nichiren movements. It was founded in 1947 by peace activist Nichidatsu Fujii who was deeply influenced by his personal relationship with Mahatma Gandhi. Fujii constructed a movement active in building "peace pagodas" throughout the world and leading "peace walks" in places with histories of strife. Whereas the Soka Gakkai and Risshō Kōsei Kai attempt to create change by working within the system, Nipponzan-Myohoji engages in non-violent civil protest on behalf of disarmament, human rights, social justice, and environmental protection.
