= Risshō Ankokuron =

Japanese Buddhist treatise by Nichiren

Risshō Ankokuron (立正安国論) is a Japanese Buddhist treatise by the Kamakura-period monk Nichiren.

== Authorship, date, and title ==
Risshō Ankokuron was written by the monk Nichiren. It dates to the first year of Bun'ō (1260). Nichiren presented it as a petition to the regent (shikken) Hōjō Tokiyori, but it was ignored, and brought the anger of the authorities down on Nichiren.

The title Risshō Ankokuron translates to "On the establishment of right doctrine and peace of the nation", and is occasionally abbreviated to Ankokuron.

== Contents ==
The work consists of a single book in ten paragraphs. It takes the form of a dialogue between "a visitor" and "the master", and is written in kanbun (Classical Chinese).

It propounds the idea that placing one's faith in the Lotus Sutra protect the safety of the nation. Nichiren invokes the fear of natural disasters, famine and plague and quotes from a variety of Buddhist sutras to demonstrate that the reason for such problems is the failure of the sovereign to embrace the correct religious doctrine. He attacks the Pure Land school of Hōnen as a sinister cult (邪宗 jashū) and emphasizes the need to reject such false doctrines and place one's faith in the Lotus Sutra.

Nichiren also predicted a foreign invasion, a prediction which came true more than a decade later when Japan was invaded by the forces of Kublai Khan.

Endō Asai, in his article on the work for the Encyclopedia Nipponica remarks that because of its status as a polemic against the religious practices of the nation, it lacks an explanation of the causes that lead to its conclusions, and recommends reading it in combination with Shugo Kokkaron (守護国家論), which Nichiren had published the previous year.

== Textual tradition ==
A copy of the text in Nichiren's own hand, dating to 1269, is preserved in Hokekyō-ji in Ichikawa, Chiba.
