= Sadāparibhūta =

Bodhisattva described in the Lotus Sutra

- Sanskrit: सदापरिभूत; Sadāparibhūta
- Chinese: (Traditional) 常不輕菩薩 (Simplified) 常不轻菩萨 (Pinyin: Chángbùqīng Púsà)
- Japanese: 常不軽菩薩(じょうふきょうぼさつ) (romaji: Jōfukyō Bosatsu)
- Korean: 상불경보살 (RR: Sangbulgyeong Bosal)
- Tibetan: རྟག་ཏུ་བརྙས་པ་ Wylie: rtag tu brnyas pa
- Vietnamese: Thường Bất Khinh Bồ Tát

Information
- Venerated by: Mahāyāna, Vajrayāna

Sadāparibhūta Bodhisattva, Never Disparaging Bodhisattva, (Ch: 常不輕菩薩 cháng bù qīng púsà; Jp: Jōfukyō Bosatsu) appears in Lotus Sutra Chapter 20 which describes the practices of Bodhisattva Never Disparaging, who lived in the Middle Period of the Law (Ch: 像法 xiàng fă) of the Buddha Awesome Sound King (Ch: 威音王如來 Wēi yīn wáng rúlái). He persevered in the face of persecution for the sake of the correct teaching, and finally attained Buddhahood. Bodhisattva Never Disparaging was Shakyamuni Buddha in one of his past lifetimes.

== Etymology ==
The name of Sadāparibhūta is thought to mean never despising (Skt. sadā-aparibhūta: always, not despising). However it can also be translated as sadā-paribhūta: always despised. According to Hurvitz, "It is possible that the name is a false sanskritization of a Prakrit form going back to sadāparibhavitā, nom. s. of sadāparibhavitr, hence ever disgracing or never disgracing, of which, of course, the former is not possible." Anesaki attributes this more popular choice of translation to Kumārajīva. (Note: Anesaki states: "The Sanskrit name Sadāparibhūta, certainly means the 'Constantly-abused,' but Kumarajiva rendered the name by the 'Constantly-revering,' that is, Sadā-aparibhūta, or with a different termination indicating the present participle. Japanese, jō-kufyō.")

== The story of Sadāparibhūta ==
In chapter 20 of the Lotus Sutra, Shakyamuni Buddha explains that those who despise or abuse the followers of the Lotus Sutra's teaching, will have to face negative karmic consequences. People who preserve the Lotus teaching will however be able to purify their faculty of the eye, ear, nose, tongue, body, and mind. In order to explain this again, the Buddha tells a story about a previous life (avadana) when he was a Bodhisattva called Sadāparibhūta. (Note: The Chapter number 20 of Kumarajiva's translation is given here. The arrangement and numbering of chapters in the extant Sanskrit version is different (ch 19).) Sadāparibhūta did not study or explain sutras but he paid homage to all Buddhist monks, nuns or lay followers he met and predicted that they all would become Buddhas. Some Buddhists questioned Sadāparibhūta's authority to make such a prediction of future Buddhahood and got angry. When they attacked him with sticks or stones he shouted from a distance, "I do not despise you. You are not despised, for you all perform bodhisattva practice and you are to become buddhas." Before he died he heard the Lotus Sutra and was able to purify the six senses. After an inconceivable number of rebirths he had accumulated great merit and attained the perfect enlightenment of a Buddha.

== See also ==
- Mahayana
- Nichiren Buddhism
- Tiantai

== Sources ==
- Anesaki, Masaharu (1916). Nichiren, the Buddhist Prophet. Cambridge, MA: Harvard University Press.
- Buswell, Robert Jr; Lopez, Donald S. Jr., eds. (2013). Sadāparibhūta, in Princeton Dictionary of Buddhism. Princeton, NJ: Princeton University Press. ISBN 9780691157863.
- Groner, Paul; Stone, Jacqueline I. (2014), "Editors' Introduction: The "Lotus Sutra" in Japan", Japanese Journal of Religious Studies, 41 (1): 1–23, archived from the original on June 14, 2014
- Hurvitz, Leon (1970–1971). "The Lotus Sutra in East Asia: A Review of Hokke Shiso". Monumenta Serica. 29. Taylor & Francis: 697–762. doi:10.1080/02549948.1970.11745009. JSTOR 40725942.
- Kanno, Hiroshi (2002). "The Practice of Bodhisattva Never Disparaging in the Lotus Sutra and its Reception in China and Japan" (PDF). Journal of Oriental Philosophy. 12: 104–122.
- Kern, Hendrik, trans. (1884), Saddharma Pundarîka or the Lotus of the True Law, Sacred Books of the East, Vol. XXI, Oxford: Clarendon Press, ISBN 9780231142885
- Kubo, Tsugunari; Yuyama, Akira, trans. (2007). The Lotus Sutra (PDF). Berkeley, Calif.: Numata Center for Buddhist Translation and Research. pp. 265–270. ISBN 978-1-886439-39-9. Archived from the original (PDF) on 2015-05-21.
- Lopez, Donald S.; Stone, Jacqueline I. (2019). Two Buddhas Seated Side by Side: A Guide to the Lotus Sūtra. Princeton University Press.
- Pye, Michael (2003), Skilful Means - A concept in Mahayana Buddhism, Routledge, ISBN 0203503791
- Suzuki, Takayasu (2016). "The Saddharmapundarika as the Prediction of All the Sentient Beings' Attaining Buddhahood: With Special Focus on the Sadaparibhuta-parivarta". Journal of Indian and Buddhist Studies (Indogaku Bukkyogaku Kenkyu). 64 (3): 1155–1163. doi:10.4259/ibk.64.3_1155.
- Watson, Burton (tr.). The Lotus Sutra and Its Opening and Closing Chapters. Tokyo: Soka Gakkai 2009. ISBN 978-4-412-01409-1
- Zimmermann, Michael (2002), A Buddha Within: The Tathāgatagarbhasūtra. Biblotheca Philologica et Philosophica Buddhica VI (PDF), Tokyo: The International Research Institute for Advanced Buddhology, Soka University, archived from the original (PDF) on November 11, 2013

== Bibliography ==
- Murano, Senchu (1967). An Outline of the Lotus Sūtra, Contemporary Religions in Japan 8/1, 61-63
- Shinjo Suguro, Nichiren Buddhist International Center, trans. (1998): Introduction to the Lotus Sutra, Fremont, Calif.: Jain Publishing Company. ISBN 0875730787
- The English Buddhist Dictionary Committee (2002). The Soka Gakkai Dictionary of Buddhism. Tōkyō: Soka Gakkai. ISBN 978-4-412-01205-9. Archived from the original on 2015-05-06.
- Stone (2012). The Sin of "Slandering the True Dharma". In Phyllis Granoff, Koichi Shinohara (eds): Sins and Sinners: Perspectives from Asian Religions. BRILL. pp. 139–. ISBN 978-90-04-22946-4.
- Chanju Mun; Ronald S. Green (2006). Buddhist Exploration of Peace and Justice. Blue Pine Books. p. 122. ISBN 978-0-9777553-0-1.
