= Jacqueline Stone =

American academic

Jacqueline Ilyse Stone (born June 30, 1949) is an emeritus professor of Japanese religion in the department of religion at Princeton University and a specialist in Japanese Buddhism, particularly Kamakura Buddhism, Nichiren Buddhism from medieval to modern times, and deathbed practices in Japan. Stone has been elected to the American Academy of Arts and Sciences.

== Biography ==
Stone earned a B.A. in Japanese and English from San Francisco State University in 1974. She then received an M.A. (1986) and a Ph.D. (1990) from UCLA, where she studied under William LaFleur and wrote a dissertation on problematic texts attributed to Nichiren. She taught at Princeton from 1990 until her retirement on July 1, 2019.

== Academic career ==
Stone has written and edited widely in English and Japanese on topics including the Lotus Sutra, medieval and modern movements in Nichiren Buddhism, historiography, death, and ideas of time and space in Japanese religions.

As a teacher at Princeton University, Stone received the Graduate Mentoring Award in the Humanities (jointly with Stephen F. Teiser) in 2014 and the President's Award for Distinguished Teaching in 2018. She has trained more than a dozen PhD students, many of whom now at leading Buddhist and Religious Studies programs in North America.

Stone has served as president of the Society for the Study of Japanese Religions and co-chair of the Buddhism section of the American Academy of Religion. She is vice president and chief financial officer of the editorial board of the Kuroda Institute for the Study of Buddhism. She is also a member of the advisory board of the Japanese Journal of Religious Studies. In 2018 she was elected to the American Academy of Arts and Sciences.

== Academic work ==
Stone's first monograph, Original Enlightenment and the Transformation of Medieval Japanese Buddhism (University of Hawai’i Press, 1999), received the 2001 American Academy of Religion Award for Excellence in the Study of Religion in the Historical Studies category. It is a study of hongaku thought, the notion that all beings are “originally enlightened” and simply need to realize their own Buddha nature. Rather than seeing the new Kamakura schools as reacting against a moribund Tendai establishment as much previous scholarship had done, the book offers an interactive model that showing that both Tendai and Nichiren movements simultaneously and creatively worked through the problems and promise of original enlightenment or hongaku discourse. While original enlightenment thought is often seen as denying the need for practice, Stone demonstrates that medieval authors promoted a variety of practices. Practice was not ignored; it was instead reconceptualized, often as an expression rather than a cause of awakening. The book introduces a four-part paradigm for enlightenment in medieval Japan based on notions of non-linearity (liberation occurs in a moment), single condition (one practice leads to liberation), all-inclusiveness (the practice contains all of enlightenment within it), and a denial of the need to make merit or remove sin.

Her second monograph, Right Thoughts at the Last Moment: Buddhism and Deathbed Practices in Early Medieval Japan (University of Hawai’i Press, 2016), won the 2017 Toshihide Numata Book Award in Buddhism. This book documents a common religious culture centered on deathbed practices that often transcend social and sectarian distinctions. The book overcomes divisions in Buddhist Studies between social history and doctrinal research by showing how teachings and practice relate to one another. Stone uncovers competing logics that help define deathbed ritual including notions of karmic causality and individual responsibility, highly social discourses of merit transfer, and the idea that the deathbed moment is so powerful that it can override a lifetime of wrongdoings. It uses a range of sources including ritual manuals, Buddhist narratives, and hagiographies, many discussed in English for the first time.

== Selected publications ==
=== Books written ===
- Stone, Jacqueline (1999). Original Enlightenment and the Transformation of Medieval Japanese Buddhism. Honolulu: University of Hawai’i Press. ISBN 9780824827717
- --- (2016). Right Thoughts at the Last Moment: Buddhism and Deathbed Practices in Early Medieval Japan. Honolulu: University of Hawai’i Press. ISBN 9780824856434
- --- (2019). Two Buddhas Seated Side by Side: A Guide to the Lotus Sūtra. Co-authored with Donald S. Lopez Jr. Princeton: Princeton University Press. ISBN 9780691174204

=== Works edited ===
- --- (1999). Revisiting Nichiren. Special issue of Japanese Journal of Religious Studies (vol. 26/3–4). Co-edited with Ruben L.F. Habito.
- --- (2007). The Buddhist Dead: Practices, Discourses, Representations. Co-edited with Bryan J. Cuevas. Honolulu: University of Hawai’i Press. ISBN 9780824835996
- --- (2008). Death and the Afterlife in Japanese Buddhism. Co-edited with Mariko N. Walter. Honolulu: University of Hawai’i Press. ISBN 9780824832049
- --- (2009). Readings of the Lotus Sutra. Co-edited with Stephen F. Teiser. New York: Columbia University Press. ISBN 9780231142885
- --- (2014). The Lotus Sutra in Japan. Special issue of Japanese Journal of Religious Studies (vol. 41/1). Co-edited with ‘Paul Groner.
