= Nichiren Shōshū =

Branch of Nichiren Buddhism

Nichiren Shōshū
- 日蓮正宗
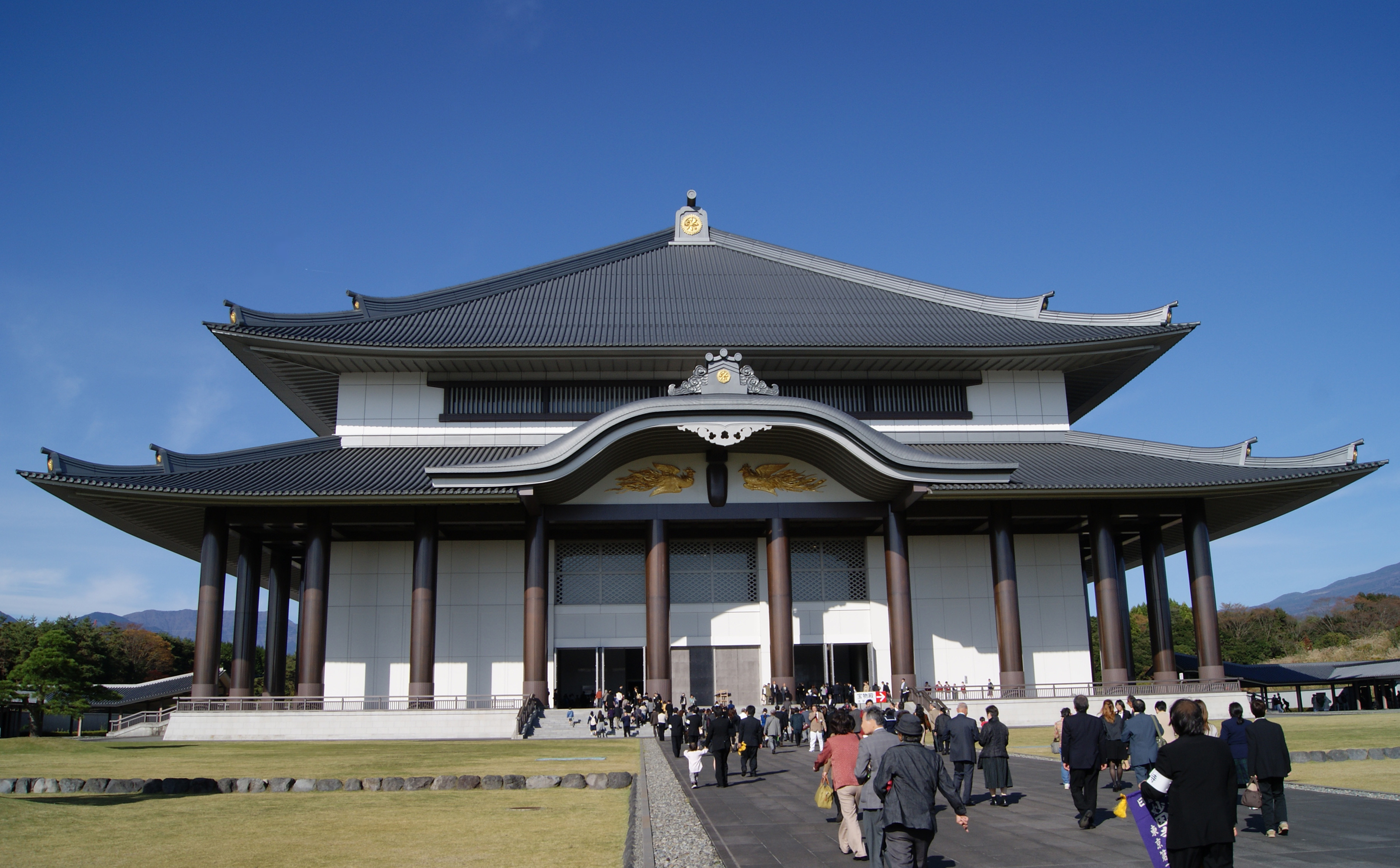
- Taiseki-ji Head Temple, Fujinomiya, Shizuoka, Japan
- Abbreviation: NST
- Classification: Nichiren Buddhism
- Scripture: Lotus Sutra; Gosho writings of Nichiren
- Theology: Honmonji Buddhism
- High Priest: Nichinyo Shonin
- Liturgy: “The Liturgy of Nichiren Shoshu”
- Headquarters: Taiseki-ji Sohonzan
- Founder: Nichiren Daishonin
- Origin: 4 May 1253; Minobu, Yamanashi (June 2), later transferred to Taiseki-ji (1290)
- Members: Over 800,000 (as of January 2021)
- Official website: English Website of Nichiren Shoshu
- Logo: Rounded crane

Nichiren Shōshū (日蓮正宗; English: The Orthodox School of Nichiren) is a branch of Nichiren Buddhism based on the traditionalist teachings of the 13th century Japanese Buddhist priest Nichiren (1222–1282), claiming him as its founder through his senior disciple Nikko Shonin (1246–1333), the founder of Head Temple Taiseki-ji, near Mount Fuji. The lay adherents of the sect are called Hokkeko members. The Enichizan Myohoji Temple in Los Angeles, California, serves as the temple headquarters within the United States.

The sect is known for vehemently rejecting the various forms of Buddhism taught by Shakyamuni Buddha as incomplete, expired and heretical for the Third Age of Buddhism. Instead, the sect is based on the exclusivist teachings of Nichiren and the chanting of "Nam-Myoho-Renge-Kyo" along with reciting curated portions of the Lotus Sutra.

The object worshipped by its believers is the Dai Gohonzon while its religious symbol is the rounded crane bird. Both its leadership and adherents claim that only their practice is "The True Buddhism" and ascribe the honorific title to Nichiren, as the "Sacred Original "True" Buddha" (御本仏, Go-Honbutsu) and the Dai-Shonin (大聖人, "Great Holy Teacher") while maintaining that the sole legitimate successor to both his ministry and legacy is Nikko Shonin and the successive high priests of the sect, led by the current 68th High Priest, Hayase Myo-e Ajari Nichinyo Shonin, who ascended to the position on 15 December 2005.

== Historical name ==
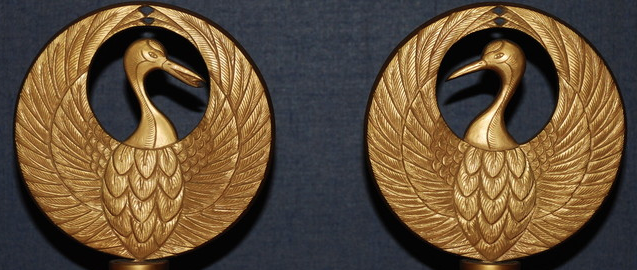
The round crane used as the official logo of Nichiren Shoshu Buddhism

Following the death of Nichiren, centuries of doctrinal divisions arose among various schools of Nichiren's followers. During the Meiji Restoration, numerous Nichiren sects were consolidated by the imperial government into several major schools: Nichiren Shu in 1874, Fuju-fuse and Fuju-fuse Komon in 1876, and in 1891 the five interrelated schools of Kempon Hokkeshu, Honmon Hokkeshu, Honmyo Hokkeshu, Hokkeshu, and Honmonshu.

In 1900, the Taiseki-ji temple split away from Honmonshu and renamed itself Nichirenshu Fuji-ha, or the Nichiren Shu (School) of the Fuji area, the branch of Taisekiji Temple, indicating the general naming of sects at the time. In 1913, the sect's name was changed to its current “Nichiren Shoshu.” This changed was purportedly made by Emperor Taisho in reference to the sect's orthodox claims. The sect is also sometimes called Nichiren Masamune, based on the local Japanese dialect in Shizuoka.

== Overview ==
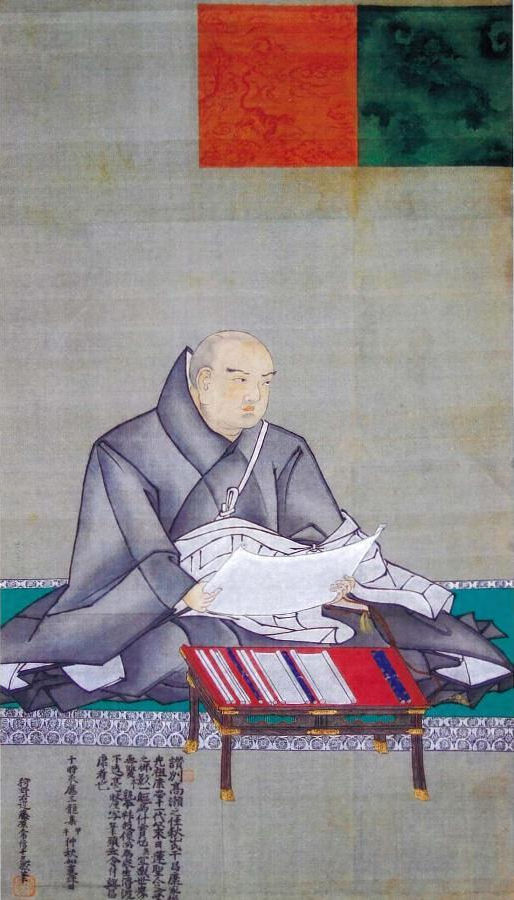
Portrait of Nichiren Daishonin by Japanese artisan Kano Tsunenobu (1636–1713), now preserved at Nichiren Shoshu Honmonji Temple in Mitoyo, Kagawa prefecture. Measuring approximately 40 inches by 22 inches on silk, Edo period.

Its head temple Taiseki-ji is located on the lower slopes of Mount Fuji in Japan. Taiseki-ji is visited regularly by Nichiren Shōshū believers from around the world who come to chant to the Dai Gohonzon, which they claim to physically embody the spirit of Nichiren in both wooden form and sumi ink.

Unlike other Mahayana Buddhist practices, Nichiren championed the Lotus Sutra as the only valid Buddhist practice and chanting Nam-Myoho-Renge-Kyo as the only valid path for anyone to obtain Buddhahood regardless of one's position in life, condition of circumstances, gender and occupational role as well as not necessarily waiting to be reborn into another future life existence.

Nichiren Shōshū claims to operate over 700 temples and temple-like facilities (lay propagation centers) in Japan, as well as 24 temples outside Japan, and a membership of over 800,000 global adherents.

Nichiren Shōshū claims a direct lineage (yuiju ichinin kechimyaku sojo) of successive High Priests from Nikko Shonin, who they believe was originally chosen by Nichiren to carry on the propagation of his Buddhist practice in the Three Ages of Buddhism, a claim that other Nichiren Buddhist sects assert as well, such as Nichiren-shū but rejected by others. Nichiren Shōshū claims this lineage is accorded to them through the following documents (copies existing, the original documents were stored in a treasure box at Omosu Honmon-ji, but were stolen during a raid by the soldiers of Takeda Katsuyori in 1581):

1. “Document Entrusting the Dharma that Nichiren propagated throughout his Life” (日蓮–期弘法付属書, Nichiren ichigo guho fuzokusho)
2. “Document Entrusting Minobu-san” (身延相承書, Minobu-san fuzokusho)
3. The “One Hundred and Six Articles" (百六箇抄, Hyaku rokka-sho)

The current leader of the sect is the 68th High Priest, Nichinyo Shōnin (1935–). Nichiren Shōshū priests distinguish themselves from those of most other schools by wearing only white and grey vestment robes and a white surplice, as they believe Nichiren did.

By the imperial Daijō-kan Decree #133 of the Emperor Meiji since 1872, Nichiren Shōshū priests, like other Japanese Buddhist sects as well as other former traditionalist "celibate" lifestyles such as artisans and Geisha et cetera, have been permitted to marry.

Accordingly, the sect does not impose any regulations of Buddhist morality on gender or marital relationships, poverty or wealthy lifestyles, ranging from personal habits or vices, divorce, abortion, sartorial or dietary choices including the consumption of vegetables versus meat, dairy or alcohol, et cetera.

The sect also vehemently rejects monetary and material donations from non-members who are not registered or affiliated with a local branch temple, citing claims of "karmic impurity" from non-believers and those who belong to other religions. This position of not accepting alms from non-believers is taught by Nichiren in his "Letter to Ni'ike" ("Ni'ike gosho"), and by Nikko Shonin in his "Twenty-six Admonitions" ("Nikko yuikai okimon"). Accordingly, the offertory fee to register as a new member is strongly forbidden to be paid for by a fellow Hokkeko believer, except under rare circumstances of extreme poverty or dire homelessness.

The sect categorizes three forms of donations for its registered believers:

1. The pro-active sharing of its religious practice to non-believers through chanting Nam Myoho Renge Kyo and Shakubuku.
2. The offertory of food and monetary donations to sustain the local temple and its priests.
3. The ancient Asian practice of gaining Buddhist merit (Japanese: 廻向, Eko) by providing free labor services (cleaning, volunteer work) for the temple.

The lay member organization of the sect, "Hokkeko–Rengo–Kai" is headquartered at the Grand Hodo-in Temple in Toshima, Tokyo.

== List of venerated Buddhist scriptures ==
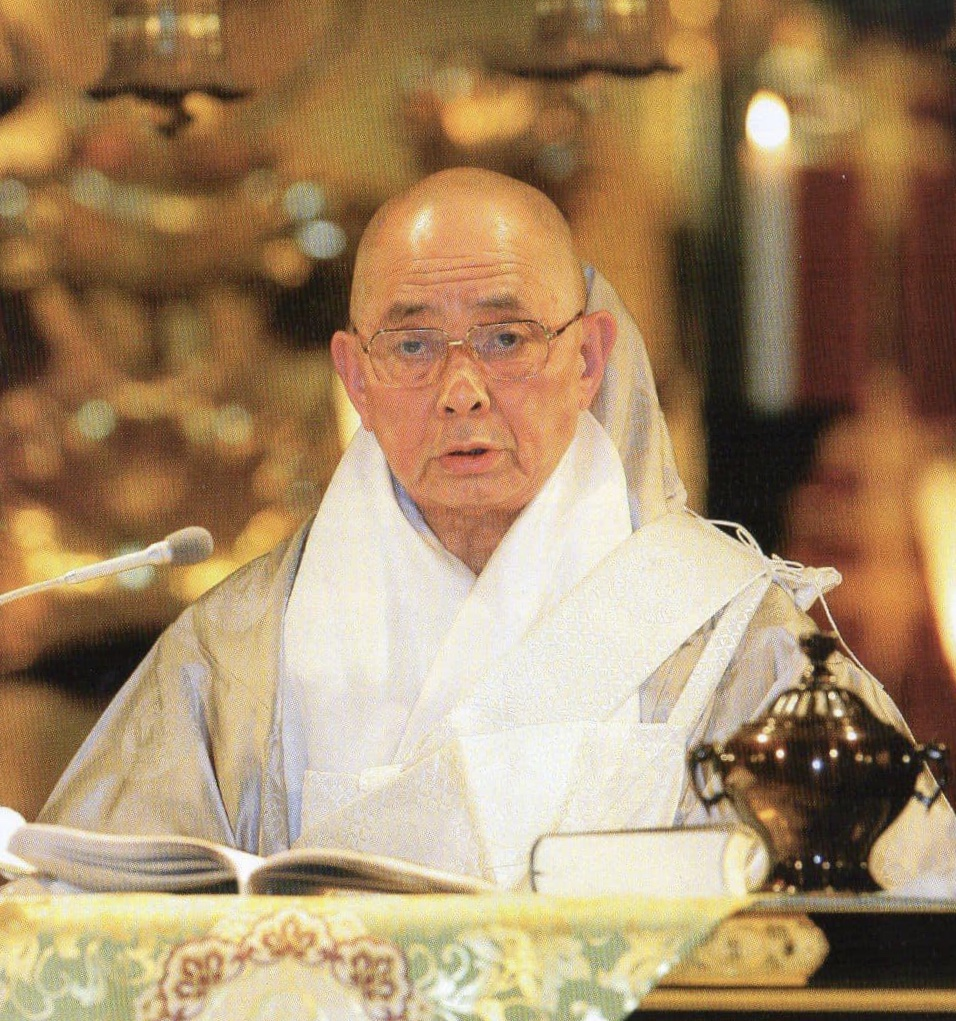
The current High Priest of the sect, Nichinyo Shonin, during a lecture after the Ushitora Gongyo in 2007.

The following articles are highly venerated within the sect:

- The Threefold Lotus Sutra in all its three forms, (法華三部経, “Hokke–Sanbu–Kyo”)
- Surviving letters of Nikko Shonin (2nd), Nichiu Shonin (9th) and Nichikan Shonin (26th)
- Surviving letters of Nichiren Daishonin called "Gosho":
  - Securing the Peace of this Land by Propagating True Buddhism – (立正安国論, Rissho Ankoku Ron) – (1258)
  - Opening Your Eyes from Blindness – (開目抄, Kaimoku-sho) – (1272)
  - The True Object of Worship – (観心本尊抄, Kanjin-no Honzon-sho) – (1273)
  - Selecting the Right Time – (撰時抄, Senji-sho) – (1275)
  - Paying Back Your Debts of Gratitude – (報恩抄, Ho'on-sho) – (1276)
  - Chanting the Title of the Lotus Sutra – (唱法華題目抄, Sho-hokke Daimoku-sho) – (1260)
  - Taking the Essence of the Lotus Sutra – (法華取要抄, Hokke Shuyo-sho) – (1274)
  - The 4 Stages of Faith + 5 Stages of Practice – (四信五品, Shishin Gohon) – (1277)
  - My Letter to Mr. Shimoyama – (下山御消息, Shimoyama Gosho-soku) – (1277)
  - The Oral Record Compilations of Ongi Kuden – (就註 法華経 口伝) Xu–Tzu Hokke–Kyo Ongi–Kuden ) – (1278)
  - Questions and Answers on the True Object of Worship – (本尊問答抄, Honzon Mondo-sho) – (1278)

To a lesser extent, the following articles are revered as secondary or minor Buddhist scriptures:

  - The ten volumes of Mohe Zhiguan (摩訶止観, "Great Concentration and Mind Contemplation"
  - The Maka – Shikan Bugyoden Guketsu (摩訶止観輔行伝弘湺, "Commentaries on Mohe Zhiguan")
  - The ten volumes of Hokke Gengi (滕華玄義, "Essentials of the Lotus Sutra")
  - The Hokke Gengi Shakusen (滕華玄義釈箋, "Commentary on Hokke Gengi")
  - The ten volumes of Hokke Mongu (滕華文句, "The Words and Phrases of the Lotus Sutra")
  - The Sangyō Gisho (三経義疏, "Commentary on the Lotus Sutra").

== Hokkeko ==
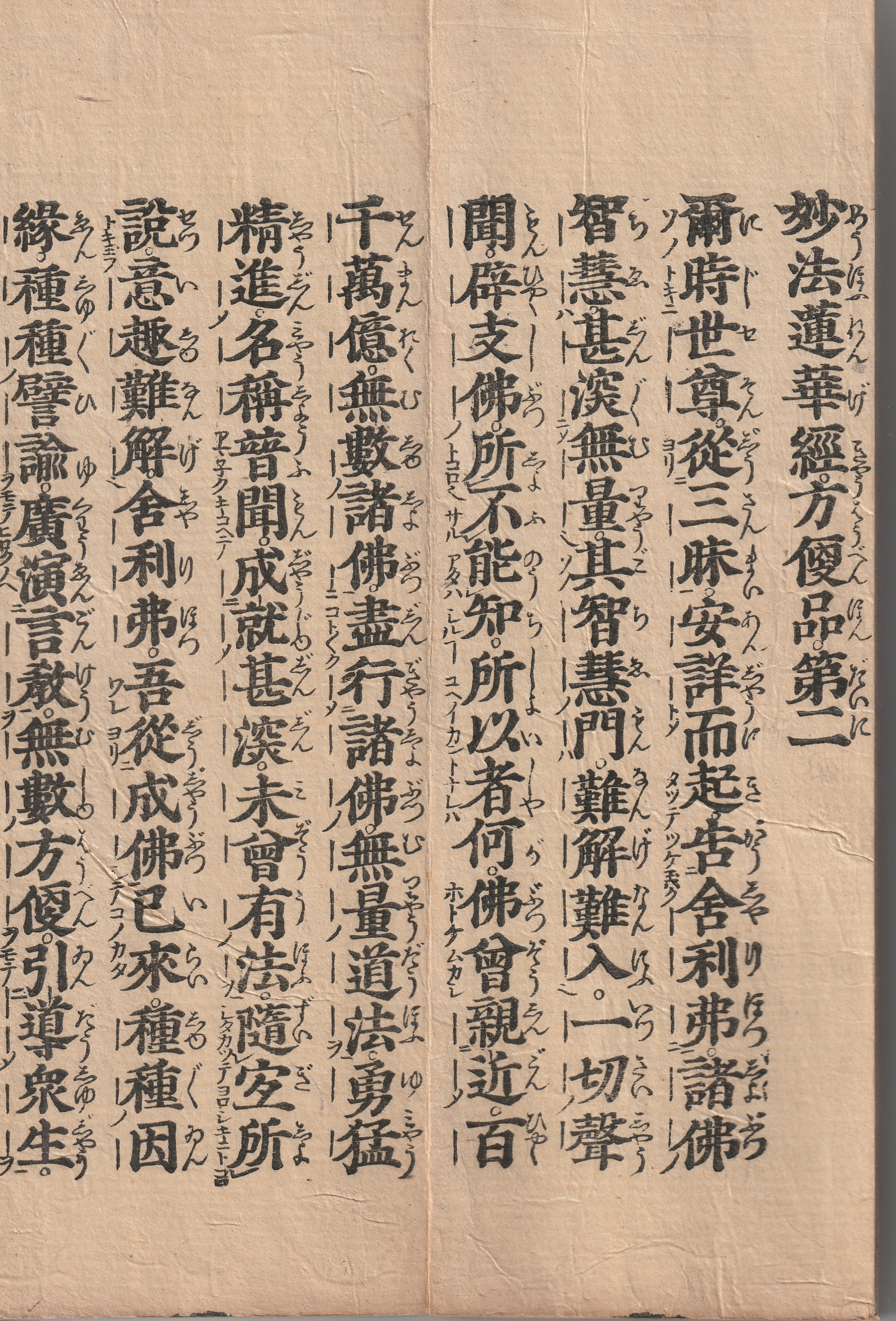
The Lotus Sutra is the core basis of teachings revered by the Hokkeko sect. A Buddhist sutra book of the Chapter 2 (Skillful Methods), from the Japanese Edo period.

Lay believers belong to official congregations known as Hokkekō groups, designed to encourage solidarity among fellow members to study Nichiren Shoshu doctrines and plan one's Tozan pilgrimage to the head temple in Japan. Most attend services at a local temple or in private homes when no temple is nearby. Services are usually officiated by a priest, but lay leaders sometimes fill in when no priest is available. When they gather, believers frequently study Nichiren Shōshū teachings, particularly the various writings of Nichiren, called Gosho. A leader in a local group or district is called Koto while a widely held position on a grander scale was once called So-Koto, but is now no longer used. The present Dai-Koto leader of the Hokkeko Federation is Mr. Koichiro Hoshino.

The official symbol of Nichiren Shōshū is the crane bird (Tsuru) in a rounded shape (Tsuru-no-Maru). Another symbol is the eight-spoked wheel of the Noble Eightfold Path called Rimbo (Treasure Ring) as well as the tortoise crest for Nikko Shonin, who is considered by the school to be the sole and legitimate successor to Nichiren. The Three Friends of Winter combination crest is also present in temple altars, representing Nichimoku Shonin.

== Religious doctrines ==
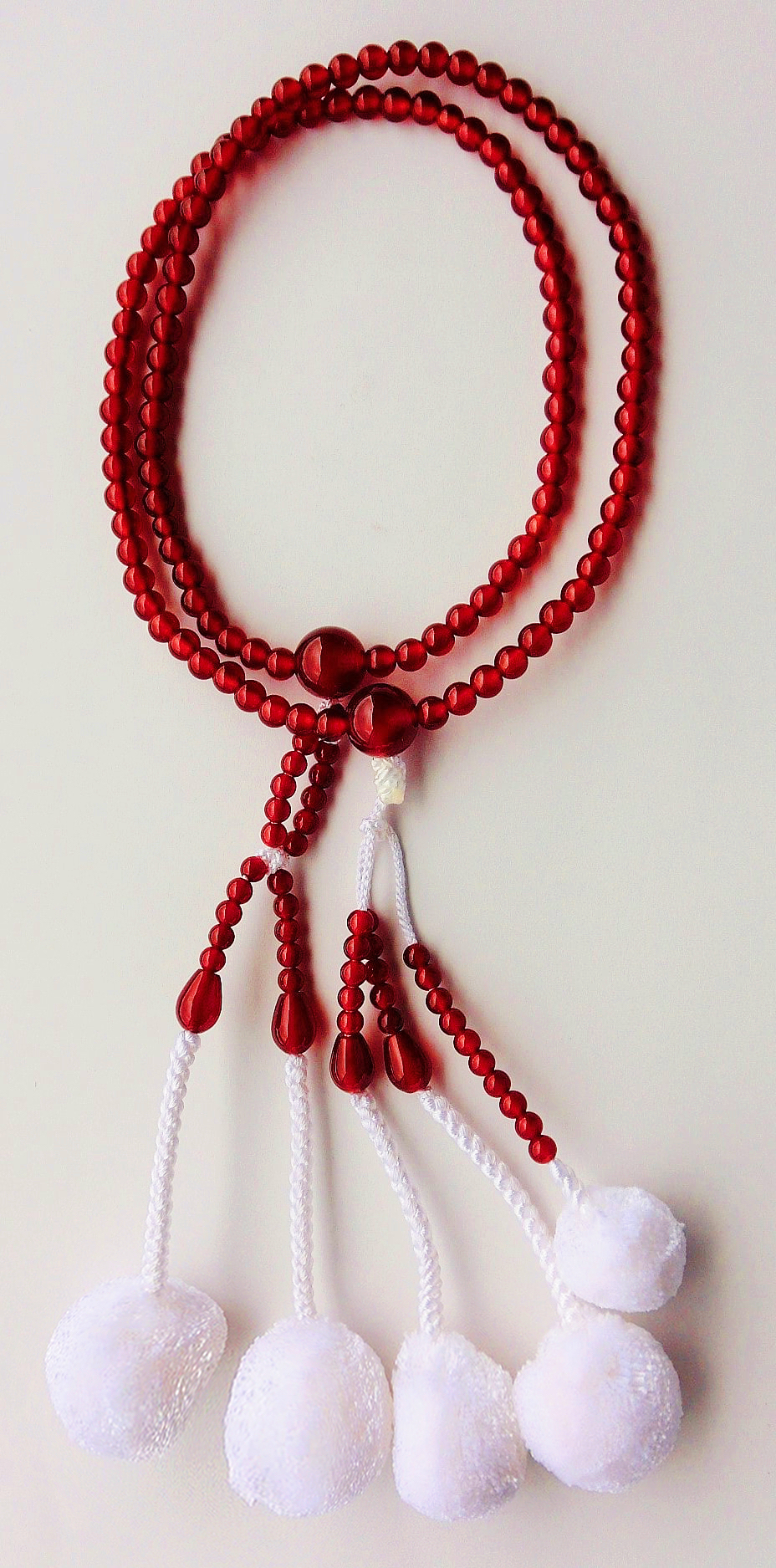
Buddhist Juzu prayer beads with white cords and balls, the only color and format permitted within Nichiren Shoshu practice

Nichiren Shōshū doctrine extends the Tiantai classification of the Buddhist sutras into the following:

1. Five periods of time + eight categories (五時八教, Goji-hakkyō)
2. The theory of 3,000 interpenetrating realms within a single life-moment (一念三千, Ichinen Sanzen)
3. Its world view of the Three Truths (三諦, San Tai).

=== The doctrine of "Buddhist Slander" ===
The sect seeks to eradicate all other religions and vehemently rejects all forms of religious interfaith practices as both evil and heretical, referring to any syncretism as "Slander" (謗 法, Ho–bo) against the Dharma taught by the founder Nichiren. It further maintains that directly supporting other religions outside the sect gains negative karma and brings grave punishment, disasters and generational suffering.

=== The Laws of Karma and Rebirth ===
The sect teaches that human children choose to be reborn to their parents based on the parents' accumulated karma of causes and conditions that existed from past and present lives. Accordingly, the sect further teaches that other life forms also generate their own karma based on cause and effect that does not recognize both space and time. These willed rebirths include humans, animals and other life forms (and vice versa) that choose to be reborn in whatever capacity to advance the Buddhist enlightenment of Nam-Myoho-Renge-Kyo in the universe.

=== Expired teachings of Shakyamuni Buddha ===
The sect claims that Shakyamuni's myriad forms of Buddhism have now lost their salvific power to gain Buddhahood for the modern age, designated at the Third Age of Buddhism since the year 1052 to the present. In addition, the school claims that Nichiren was fulfilling an eschatological prophecy made by Shakyamuni Buddha in Chapter 21 of the Lotus Sutra regarding the Three Ages of Buddhism which states:

"…Like the rays of the sun and the moon that dispel the darkness of phenomena, this person will practice in the world, dispel the darkness of all humanity and lead immeasurable numbers of bodhisattvas to finally attain the One Vehicle" – Chapter 21: The Mystical Powers of Tathagata Buddha.

=== Interpretation of the Three Buddhist Jewels ===
1. Buddha – Nichiren Shōshū teaches that Nichiren is the “True Original Buddha” for the modern times corresponding to the Third Buddhist Age and for all eternity.
2. Dharma – The Dharma is referred to by the sect as "The Mystic Law", referring to the ultimate teachings of Nichiren, crystallized in Nam Myōhō Renge Kyō. The sect further teaches that this Mystic Law is the internal enlightenment of Nichiren himself called "Naisho" (内 証) and is the "Original True Buddha" from an infinite, mystical timeless point in the Universe (久遠元初, "Kuon–Ganjo"). Furthermore, the sect teaches that this enlightenment is physically embodied within the Dai-Gohonzon wooden mandala and was left for the posterity of future generations. The same definition of Dharma is accorded to its authorized, transcribed copies called "Gohonzon" that are loaned by the sect to its followers.
3. Sangha – The Sangha refers to one of Nichiren's senior disciples, Nikko Shonin, its lineage of succeeding High Priests, along with the entire collective of Nichiren Shōshū priests who serve to teach, protect and preserve the doctrines and dogmas of Nichiren Shōshū.

Accordingly, the sect teaches that the Three Jewels of Buddhism are a single, inseparable entity that equally share the internal enlightenment of Nichiren. More specifically, the sect teaches that the Buddha and the Dharma are perpetrated and upheld by the Sangha priesthood (Heisei Shinpen). The common parlance used in the sect among believers to describe the three Buddhist treasures is termed "Buddha–Law–Priesthood".

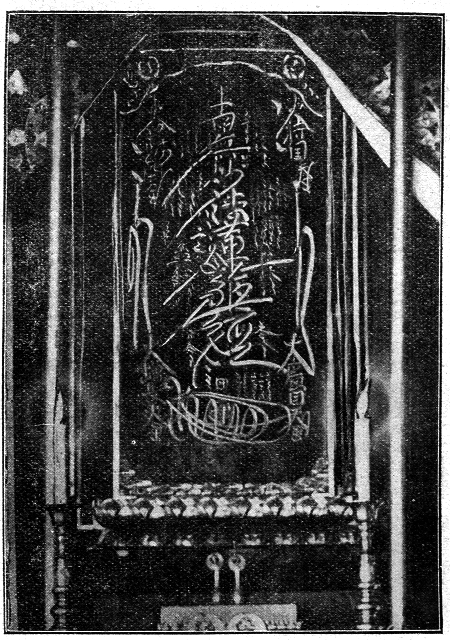
Photograph of the Dai-Gohonzon at Taisekiji, printed in Kumada Ijō's (熊田葦城) book Nichiren Shōnin (日蓮上人), 8th edition, p, 375, originally published in 1911.

=== The "Three Great Secret Laws" ===
According to the doctrinal beliefs of Nichiren Shoshu, Nichiren instituted the mastery of three spiritual disciplines:

1. Precepts – upholding the Buddhist vows ("Jukai") of daily Buddhist practice
2. Meditation – purifying the mind through chanting "Nam-Myoho-Renge-Kyo" ("Shodai")
3. Wisdom – upholding the teachings of religion through the office of the Head Temple ("Kaidan")

Nichiren Shoshu teaches that Nichiren revealed the Three Great Secret Laws which matches the three above:

1. The Dai-Gohonzon – as the Supreme Object of Worship, sourcing to the vow of Precepts.
2. The Daimoku – of Nam Myoho Renge Kyo as the Supreme Invocation, sourcing to its meditational practice.
3. The Dai-Sekiji no Honmon Kaidan (Tai-sekiji) – as the Platform of the High Sanctuary of Essential Teaching, sourcing to its authoritative office of Wisdom.

=== On the Lotus Sutra ===
The Lotus Sutra is the core basis of the teachings of the sect, and divides the book into two parts:

- "Theoretical Teachings" ( "Gate of Tracing", Jp: 迹 門 Shaku–mon) – Chapters 1–14
- "Essential Teachings" ( "Gate of Origin", Jp: 本 門 Hon–mon) – Chapters 15–28

The sect teaches that a significant difference between the two lies with the standpoint of who is preaching them. The Theoretical Teachings (Chapters 1–14) are preached by Shakyamuni Buddha who reached Buddhahood in Bodhgaya, India. On the other hand, Shakyamuni declares in the Essential Teachings (Chapters 15–28) that his enlightenment in India was only temporary, and that he in fact already attained Buddhahood in a mysterious, timeless point in the Universe.

As result of these interpretations of the Tendai school and Nichiren schools of thought, all the provisional Buddhas, such as Amida Nyorai, Dainichi Nyorai, and Yakushi Nyorai, were integrated into one single original Buddha.

Another doctrine taught by the sect is that Chapter 2 of the Lotus Sutra does not reveal the cause or "seed" of enlightenment gained by Shakyamuni Buddha. Rather, this secret was revealed in Chapter 16 of the Lotus Sutra by Ākāśagarbha ("Heavenly Jewel") Bodhisattva to Nichiren and his latter claim to the expressed public recitation of Nam-Myoho-Renge-Kyo through an alleged deeper understanding of the text.

Furthermore, the sect teaches that:

- The recitation of Chapter 2 is a self–declaration to reject and abolish the various religions and forms of Buddhism taught by Shakyamuni Buddha.
- The recitation of Chapter 16 (through a metaphysical reading) crystallizes this Buddhist secret (also called "Hidden Treasure") which gains a person the state of Buddhahood. The sect teaches that this hidden mystical secret is the practice of "Jigyo–Keta" (自 行 化 他) or the widespread propagation of the practice to non-believers.

=== The meaning of Nam-Myoho-Renge-Kyo ===
The sect teaches that Nam-myoho-renge-kyo is the quintessential core practice of Nichiren's teachings, is weighted on heavily with great significance in the Ongi Kuden. Nam-myoho-renge-kyo is explained in the Ongi Kuden as follows:

| Shindoku | Chinese | Sanskrit | English | Hermeneutic interpretation of Nichiren Shoshu |
|---|---|---|---|---|
| Nam | 南無 | Namaskar | Devotion | Dedication of one's life purpose to the propagation of Myoho-renge-kyo and to Nichiren Daishonin as the Buddha who embodies the truth, the Dai Gohonzon wooden mandala of the Three Great Secret Laws in terms of both Buddhist theory and religious practice. |
| Myoho | 妙法 | Saddharma | The "Mysterious Law" | Ignorance and enlightenment are a single entity, both hell and heavenly states are also a singular essence. |
| Renge | 蓮華 | Puṇḍarīka | Nelumbo nucifera (lotus flower) | Singularity of both cause and effect (as symbolized by this flower representing the circulations of karma.) |
| Kyo | 經 | Sutra | Buddhist Sutra or teachings | All phenomena through three existences of past, present, and future as embodied by the Buddha of Compassion, Nichiren Daishonin. |

== Ceremonies ==
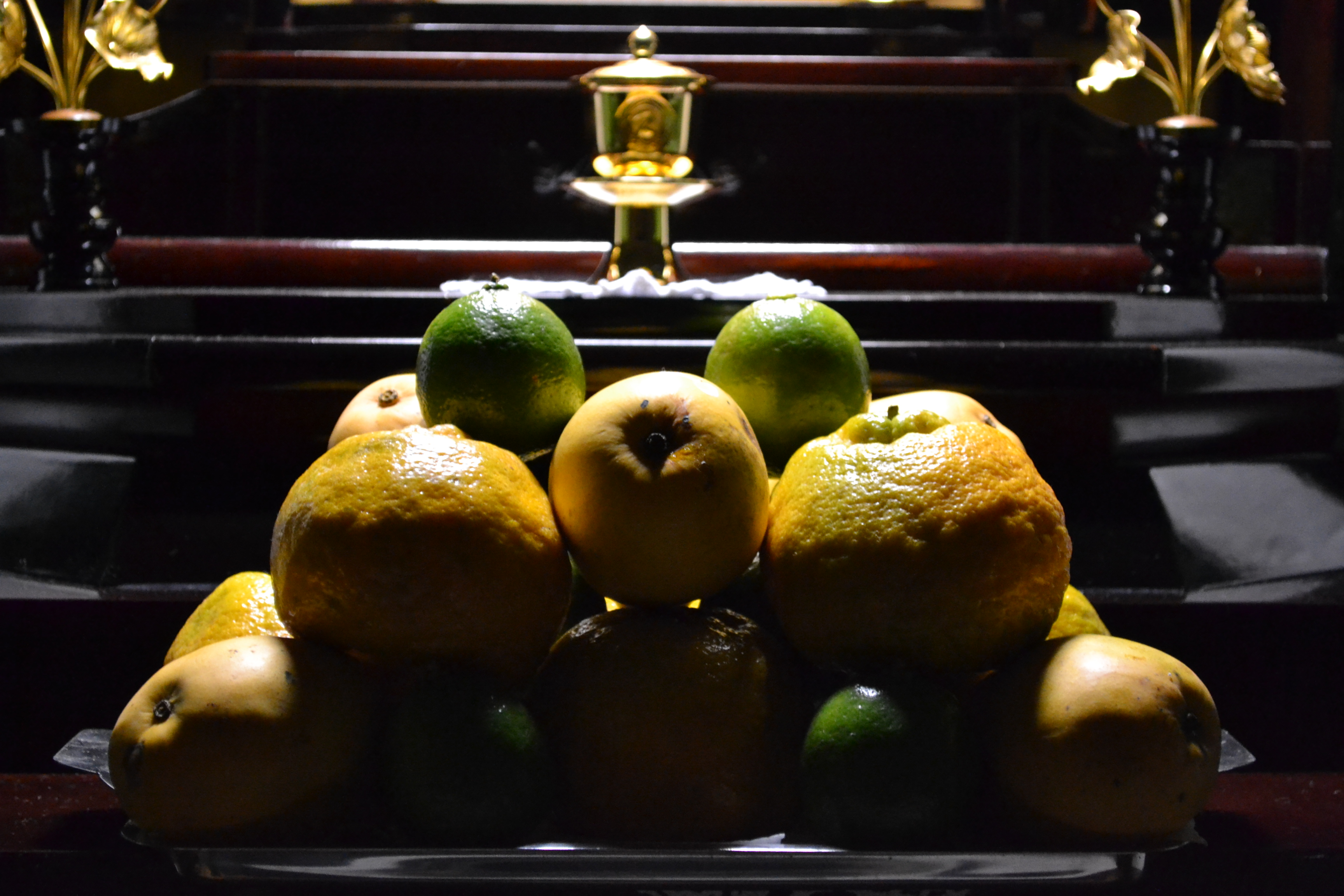
Offerings of fruit on a Butsudan altar.

Several ceremonies are conducted within Nichiren Shoshu, some as memorials for lauded figures, others in commemoration or celebration of momentous events, as well as life-cycle event ceremonies for individuals including conversion to Buddhism, marriages and funerals. Visitors who enter the temple may consider becoming a member by accepting the Gojukai ceremony which the lay believer accepts the precepts of Nichiren Shōshū and vow to defend and venerate the Dai-Gohonzon in their present existence and future existences if reborn once again. Nichiren Shoshu claims this tradition from the Chapter 21 of the Lotus Sutra where Shakyamuni Buddha passes his vow to the Visistacaritra Bodhisattva and his "infinite followers" along with the merits of the Seven Jewels of the Treasure Tower.

Former members who have not been active are allowed to receive the Kankai or reaffirmation vows.

- Gojukai ceremony for new members
- Kaigen-shu for consecrating and "opening the eyes" of Gohonzon, Nenju prayer beads and Buddhist gravestones
- Kankai-kishi ceremony for former members
- Gohonzon approval (dependent on priestly discretion)
- Kantoku ceremony for transferring ownership of an heirloom Gohonzon to a practicing descendant
- Toba (Stupa) memorials for dead relatives and friends
- Inscription for Kakocho memorial / ancestral book for the home altar
- Gokaihi ceremony at the Hoando, donation for the prayers and maintenance of the Dai-Gohonzon

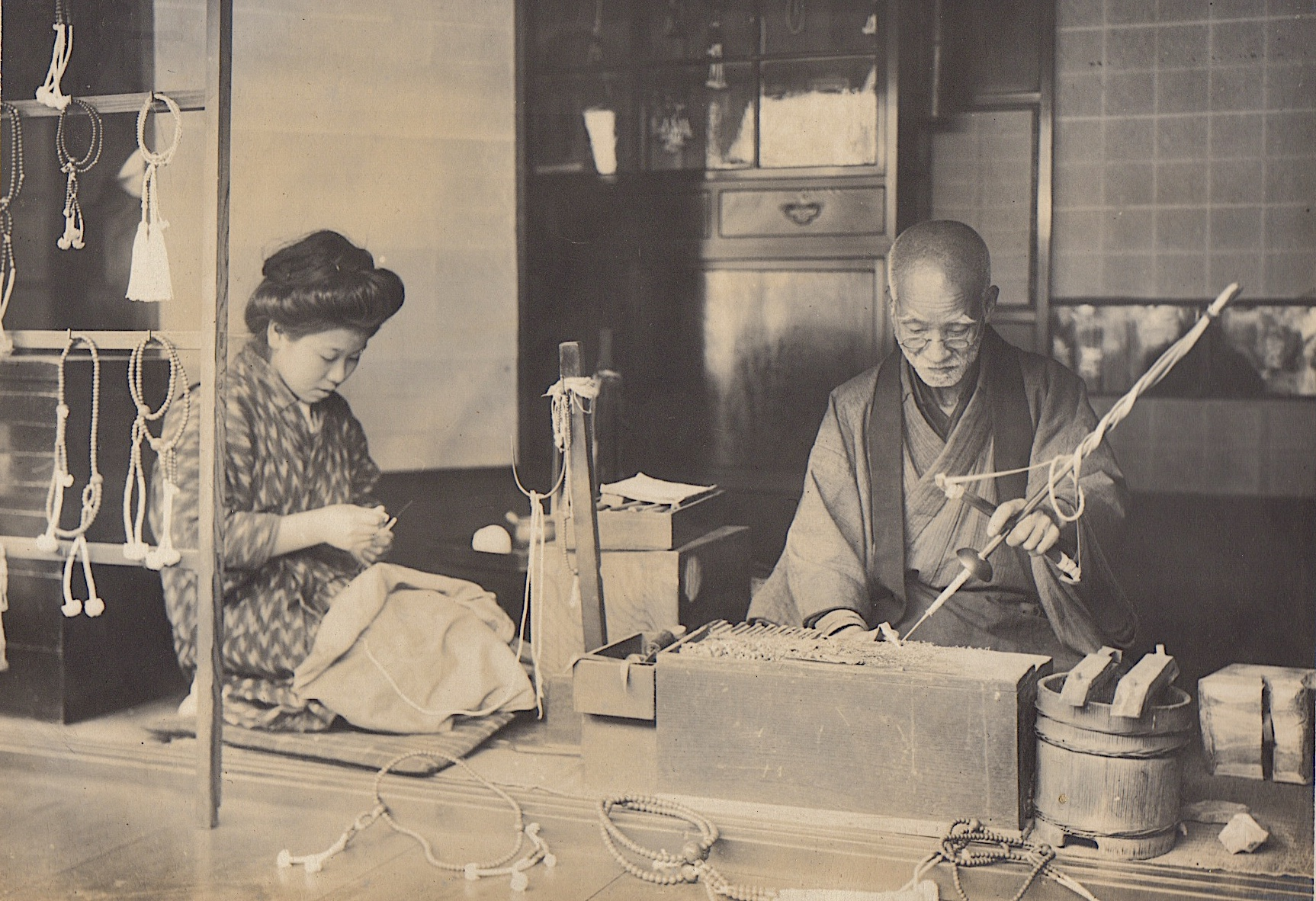
Two Japanese artisans making Juzu Buddhist prayer beads used in the Nichiren Shoshu school. The ordinary five strand in white cords, tasseled version for priests. Dated 1 September 1914, from the collection of Mr. Elstner Hilton (1887–1950).

Donations to a Nichiren Shōshū temple is highly regarded as private and is therefore always contained in small white envelopes labeled Gokuyo offering with a checklist that labels the purpose of ones donation. In addition, monetary donations from non-members are strongly prohibited.

The difference between a Nichiren Shōshū Gohonzon granted to lay believers by the priesthood and all other types is that they are the only ones specifically sanctioned and issued by Nichiren Shōshū. The following Gohonzons are issued if deemed worthy of the lay believer upon application:

- Joju type – a carved wooden platform or grand paper scroll with a special inscription that is reserved for grand temples and buildings, or descendants of who have protected the Dai Gohonzon or Head Temple during times of disaster.
- Regular sized katagi, or woodblock – commonly issued to practicing members
- Large size katagi Tokubetsu – granted depending on the Chief Priest highly commendable discretion
- mamori or pocket sized – issued to traveling practitioners

Regardless of their type, all Gohonzons issued by Nichiren Shōshū have been consecrated by one of the successive High Priests in a ceremony conducted in the Hoando building of Taiseki-ji temple. It is believed that this ceremony endows a Gohonzon with the same enlightened property of the Dai-Gohonzon, thus giving it the same power. Upon death, a Gohonzon must be returned to a Nichiren Shōshū temple. Unauthorized reproduction or photography of the Gohonzon is prohibited to believers.

== Interpretation of Buddhahood ==
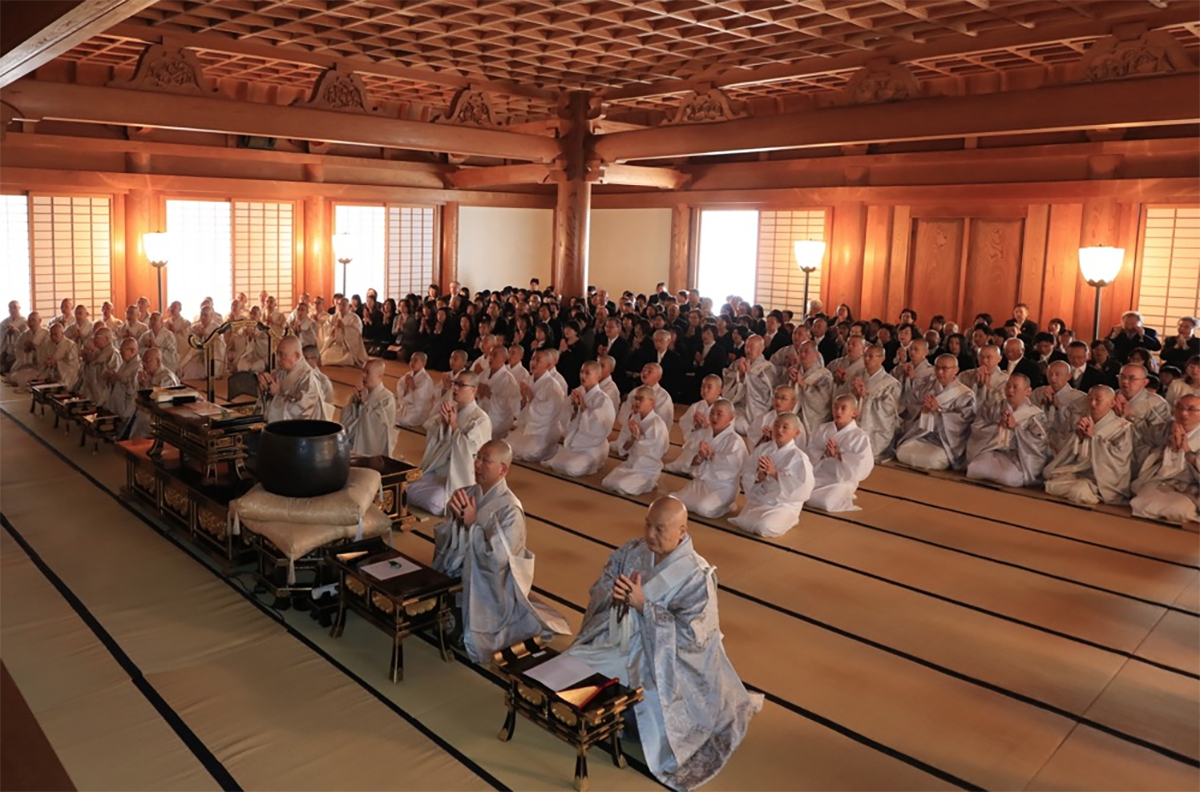
A Tokudo, or graduation ceremony at the Mutsubo building in Taisekiji

The sect teaches that personal enlightenment can be achieved in one's present life form existence (即身成仏, Sokushin Jobutsu). The repetitive chanting of Nam-Myoho-Renge-Kyo is central and primary to their practice. Accordingly, the sect maintains that only by chanting these words to their object of worship (Jp, Hon–zon) that a human person (the minimal level of existence, and excluding animals, insects or insentient beings) is believed to change or eradicate the accumulation of negative karma and ultimately achieve both happiness and enlightenment. In this process of achieving benefits, obstacles overcome or personal wishes granted, the individual chooses to lead others to an enlightened state of being.

The phrase Nam-Myōhō-Renge-Kyō is referred by the sect as the Daimoku (題目: "title") of the revered text, the Lotus Sutra. This stems from their belief that it is composed of Nam and the Japanese title of the Lotus Sutra, Myōhō-Renge-Kyō, as revealed by the founder Nichiren for widespread propagation consisting of the following components (termed "Powers of the Mystic Law"):

1. The believer's practice (Gyō–riki: power of practice)
2. Faith (Shin–riki: power of faith)
3. Invoking the power of the Buddha (Butsu–Riki)
4. Then coupled with the power of the Dharma inherent in the Gohonzon (Ho–riki).

This four-part combination of physical practice and religious faith are claimed to eradicate negative forms of karma, attract positive new karma and transcend to a happier and higher life status.

The current version of its daily practice consists of performing Gongyo, a recitation of the Lotus Sutra and chanting its words (Shodai). It consists of the prose section of Chapter 2 of the Lotus Sutra and the prose and verse portion of Chapter 16 along with five designated prayers.

This regimented practice when shared with non-believers (Jigyo–Keta) is regarded by the sect as the quintessential essence (called "True Cause") for gaining the life state of Buddhahood. Furthermore, it teaches that this secret was revealed by the Buddhist god Ākāśagarbha at a large open garden during the training years of Nichiren prior to his attempted execution and revelation of enlightenment at Shichirigahama beach.

== Object of Worship ==
The Dai Gohonzon (also called: Dai-Gohonzon of the High Sanctuary of Essential Teachings) is a calligraphic mandala inscribed with Sanskrit and Chinese characters on a plank of Japanese camphorwood as the only object of worship by believers. The sect claims that Nichiren inscribed it on 12 October 1279 (Japanese: Koan).

The sect claims the ninpō-ikka or "Unity of the Person and the Buddhist Dharma" as one entity and the Dai Gohonzon is revered as the personification of Nichiren himself. Every Nichiren Shōshū temple and household possesses a gohonzon, or transcription of the Dai Gohonzon rendered by its successive High Priests.

The Dai Gohonzon is enshrined at the Hoando worship hall within the Taiseki-ji Grand Main Temple complex grounds at the foot of Mount Fuji. The temple priesthood will only expose the image for constant public veneration once the conversion of the Emperor of Japan and Kosen-rufu is achieved, maintaining the beliefs of Nichiren Shōshū as the primary religion in the world by Japanese imperial decree. Unlike the other Gohonzons enshrined at the Head Temple, it is not enshrined with shikimi branches nor Taiko drums.

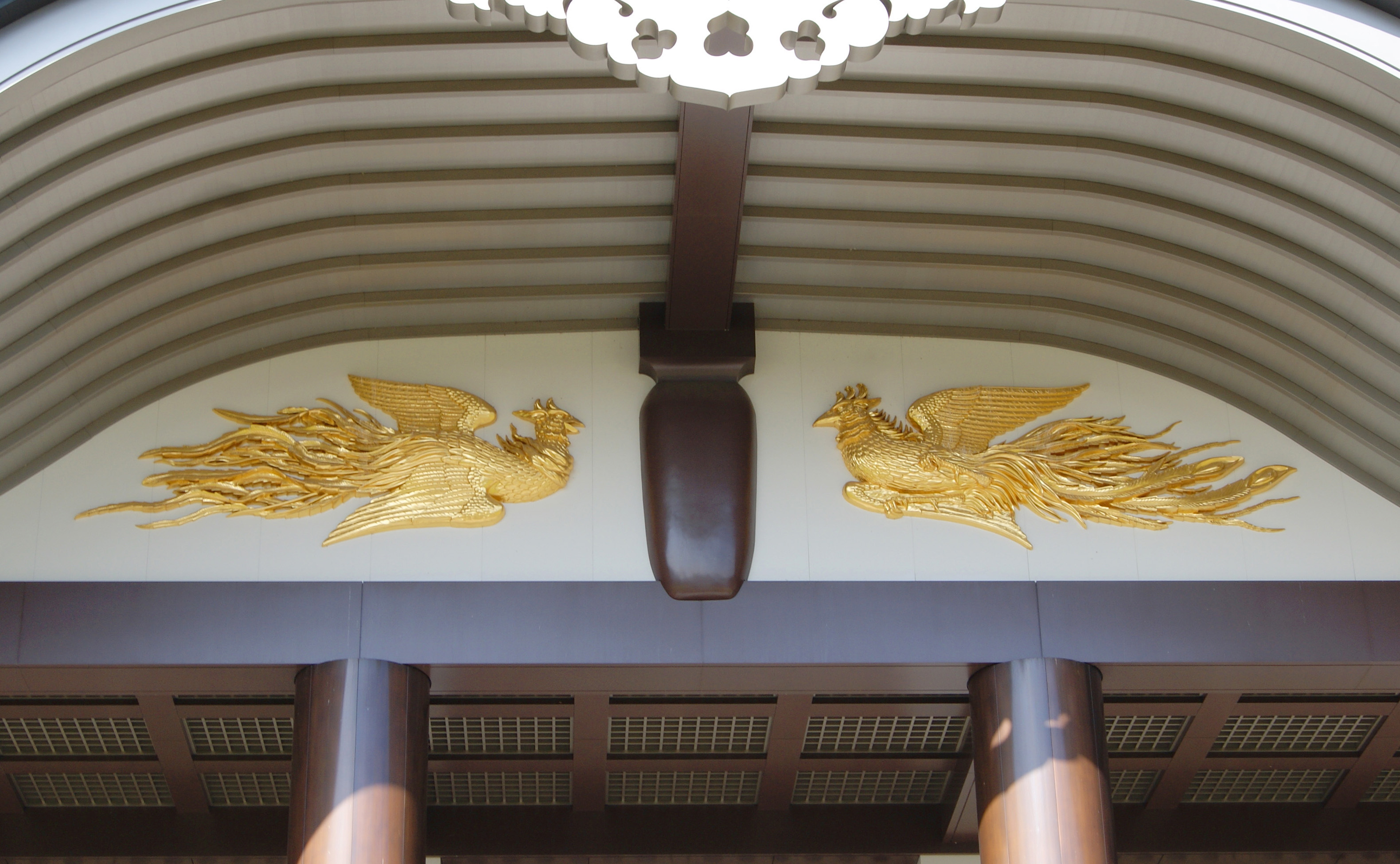
Fenghuangs on the Taiseki-ji main entrance of the Dai-Gohonzon sanctuary.

Transcriptions of the Dai Gohonzon, made by successive High Priests of Nichiren Shōshū, are called gohonzon (go, honorific prefix indicating respect). Most gohonzons in temples are wood tablets in which the inscription is carved; the tablets are coated with black urushi and have gilded characters. Gohonzons enshrined in temples and other similar facilities are personally transcribed by one of the successive High Priests.

Hokkeko followers can make a request to receive a personal gohonzon to their local temple chief priest. These gohonzons are ritually – consecrated facsimiles printed on paper using a traditional method and presented as a small scroll, measuring approximately 7 x 15 inches. The local chief priest sends all requests to the Head Temple. As these requests are granted, gohonzons are then delivered to the recipient's local priest and he bestows them on the individual members. In this ritual, the recipient vows to sincerely believe in Nichiren's teachings and to faithfully practice the religion and uphold its doctrines.

== List of High Priests ==
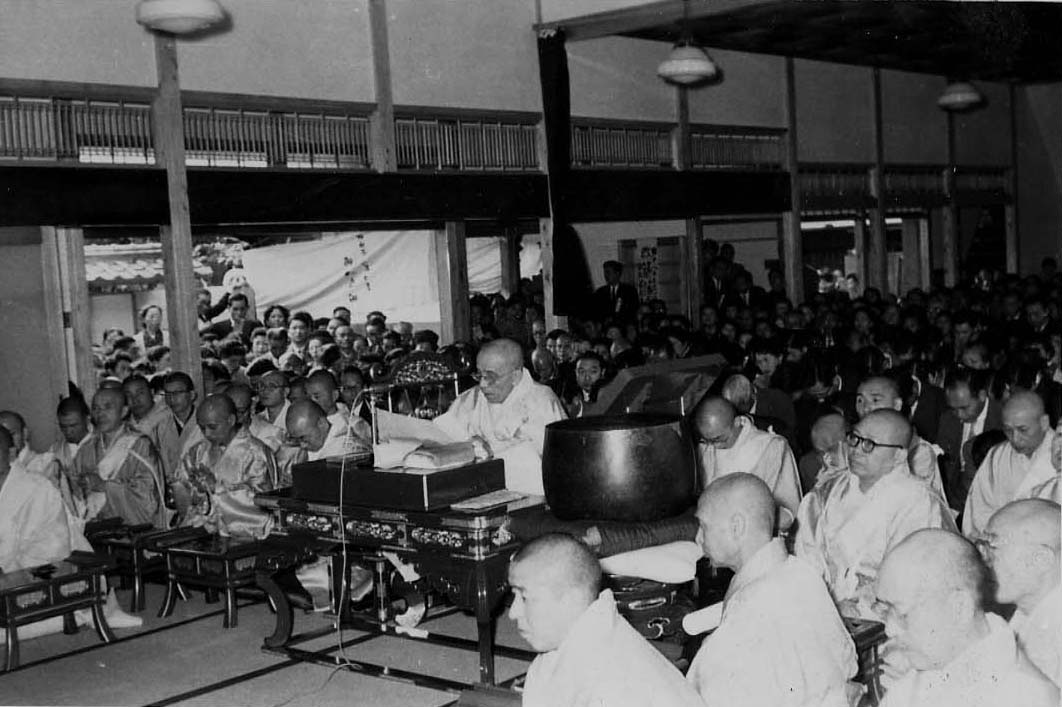
The 65th High Priest Nichijun Shonin officiating the Gongyo prayers in October 1959 at the Jozai-ji temple in Ikebukuro, Toshima, Japan

List of High Priests of Nichiren Shōshū
| Rank | High Priest | Date of Birth | Date of Death |
|---|---|---|---|
| 1 | Nichiren Daishonin | 16 February 1222 | 13 October 1282 |
| 2 | Nikko Shonin | 8 March 1246 | 7 February 1333 |
| 3 | Nichimoku Shonin | 28 April 1260 | 15 November 1333 |
| 4 | Nichido Shonin | 1283 | 26 February 1341 |
| 5 | Nichigyo Shonin | Unrecorded | 13 August 1369 |
| 6 | Nichiji Shonin | Unrecorded | 4 June 1406 |
| 7 | Nichi a Shonin | Unrecorded | 10 March 1407 |
| 8 | Nichi-ei Shonin | 7 November 1353 | 4 August 1419 |
| 9 | Nichiu Shonin | 16 April 1402 | 29 September 1482 |
| 10 | Nichijo Shonin | Unrecorded | 20 November 1472 |
| 11 | Nittei Shonin | Unrecorded | 7 April 1472 |
| 12 | Nitchin Shonin | 1469 | 24 June 1527 |
| 13 | Nichi-in Shonin | 1518 | 6 July 1589 |
| 14 | Nisshu Shonin | 1555 | 17 August 1617 |
| 15 | Nissho Shonin | 1562 | 7 April 1622 |
| 16 | Nichiju Shonin | 1567 | 21 February 1632 |
| 17 | Nissei Shonin | 1600 | 5 November 1683 |
| 18 | Nichi-ei Shonin | 3 March 1594 | 7 March 1638 |
| 19 | Nisshun Shonin | 1610 | 12 November 1669 |
| 20 | Nitten Shonin | 1611 | 21 September 1686 |
| 21 | Nichinin Shonin | 1612 | 4 September 1680 |
| 22 | Nisshun Shonin | 1637 | 29 October 1691 |
| 23 | Nikkei Shonin | 1648 | 14 November 1707 |
| 24 | Nichi-ei Shonin | 1650 | 24 February 1715 |
| 25 | Nichiyu Shonin | 1669 | 28 December 1729 |
| 26 | Nichikan Shonin | 7 August 1665 | 19 August 1726 |
| 27 | Nichiyo Shonin | 1670 | 4 June 1723 |
| 28 | Nissho Shonin | 1681 | 25 August 1734 |
| 29 | Nitto Shonin | 3 March 1689 | 1 December 1737 |
| 30 | Nitchu Shonin | 1687 | 11 October 1743 |
| 31 | Nichi-in Shonin | 17 October 1687 | 14 June 1769 |
| 32 | Nikkyo Shonin | 1704 | 12 August 1757 |
| 33 | Nichigen Shonin | 15 August 1711 | 26 February 1778 |
| 34 | Nisshin Shonin | 1714 | 26 July 1765 |
| 35 | Nichi-on Shonin | 1716 | 3 July 1774 |
| 36 | Nikken Shonin | 1717 | 3 October 1791 |
| 37 | Nippo Shonin | 23 January 1731 | 26 May 1803 |
| 38 | Nittai Shonin | 1731 | 20 February 1785 |
| 39 | Nichijun Shonin | 1736 | 30 July 1801 |
| 40 | Nichinin Shonin | 1747 | 25 August 1795 |
| 41 | Nichimon Shonin | 1751 | 14 August 1796 |
| 42 | Nichigon Shonin | 1748 | 11 July 1797 |
| 43 | Nisso Shonin | 1759 | 3 December 1805 |
| 44 | Nissen Shonin | 1760 | 7 January 1822 |
| 45 | Nichirei Shonin | Unrecorded | 8 May 1808 |
| 46 | Nitcho Shonin | 1766 | 27 January 1817 |
| 47 | Nisshu Shonin | 1769 | 22 September 1816 |
| 48 | Nichiryo Shonin | 18 February 1771 | 29 May 1851 |
| 49 | Nisso Shonin | 1773 | 8 May 1830 |
| 50 | Nichijo Shonin | 1795 | 1 May 1836 |
| 51 | Nichi-ei Shonin | 1798 | 9 July 1877 |
| 52 | Nichiden Shonin | 25 August 1817 | 24 June 1890 |
| 53 | Nichijo Shonin | 11 October 1831 | 25 June 1892 |
| 54 | Nichi-in Shonin | 16 March 1829 | 2 June 1880 |
| 55 | Nippu Shonin | 5 February 1835 | 4 March 1919 |
| 56 | Nichi-o Shonin | 1848 | 15 June 1922 |
| 57 | Nissho Shonin | 24 May 1865 | 26 January 1928 |
| 58 | Nitchu Shonin | 18 December 1861 | 18 August 1923 |
| 59 | Nichiko Shonin | 24 February 1867 | 23 November 1957 |
| 60 | Nichikai Shonin | 23 August 1873 | 21 November 1943 |
| 61 | Nichiryu Shonin | 10 August 1874 | 24 March 1947 |
| 62 | Nikkyo Shonin | 18 September 1869 | 17 June 1945 |
| 63 | Nichiman Shonin | 5 March 1873 | 7 January 1951 |
| 64 | Nissho Shonin | 24 September 1879 | 14 October 1957 |
| 65 | Nichijun Shonin | 10 October 1898 | 17 November 1959 |
| 66 | Nittatsu Shonin | 15 April 1902 | 22 July 1979 |
| 67 | Nikken Shonin | 19 December 1922 | (resigned on 16 December 2005); 20 September 2019 |
| 68 | Nichinyo Shonin (Nichinyo Hayase) | 25 February 1935 | Current High Priest (Incumbent) since 16 December 2005 |

- The dates denote the date of death of each high priest.

== Expelled lay and priestly groups ==
The following groups, which had been associated with Nichiren Shoshu, were expelled in the years 1974 (Kenshokai), 1980 (Shoshinkai), and 1991 (Soka Gakkai).

=== Kenshokai (顕正会, Clear and Orthodox Group), 1974 ===
In 1974, a lay group called Myōshinkō from the Myokoji Temple in Shinagawa ward in Tokyo was expelled by High Priest Nittatsu Hosoi from Nichiren Shōshū after holding a public protest against Soka Gakkai for claiming that the Shohondo building was the true and permanent national sanctuary of the Dai Gohonzon as mandated by Nichiren, even without the religious conversion of Emperor Showa. The group was known for being brazen in confronting Soka Gakkai and former High Priest Nittatsu Shonin, resulting in a lawsuit against him amidst public protest.

The group later changed its corporation name to Fuji Taisekiji Kenshōkai. Kenshōkai has been described as one of the fastest growing denominations of Buddhism in Japan. The Kenshokai sometimes uses an enlarged, variant copy of the Dai Gohonzon image from the year 1728 by Nichikan Shonin, the 26th High Priest of Head Temple Taisekiji, along with contemporary ones issued by the Taisekiji Head Temple. These Gohonzon images use the same brown ornamental border sourced and used by Nichiren Shoshu.

=== Shōshinkai (正信会, Orthodox Faith Group), 1980 ===
In 1980, a group of Nichiren Shōshū priests and lay supporters called Shōshinkai (English: Correct Faith Group) were expelled from the Head Temple by 67th High Priest Nikken Shonin for questioning the legitimacy of the new head abbot Nikken and for criticising Soka Gakkai's influence on temple affairs. At the time, Soka Gakkai supported Nikken's claim to be the rightful successor of Nittatsu Hosoi as high priest. Shōshinkai continues to refer to itself as the true Nichiren Shōshū. Shōshinkai later founded a dissident association of Nichiren Shoshu priests seeking reformation and began transcribing their own version of the Gohonzon rather than taking a transcribed copy from one of the Nichiren Shōshū high priests. Most of them have aged or deceased, and their temples have since reverted to Nichiren Shoshu administration after their death, having been replaced with younger priests affiliated with the Head Temple Taiseki-ji. Some of these older priests have also joined other Nichiren sects or made their own, such as the case in Taiwan.

=== Soka Gakkai (創価学会, Value Creation Society), 1991 ===
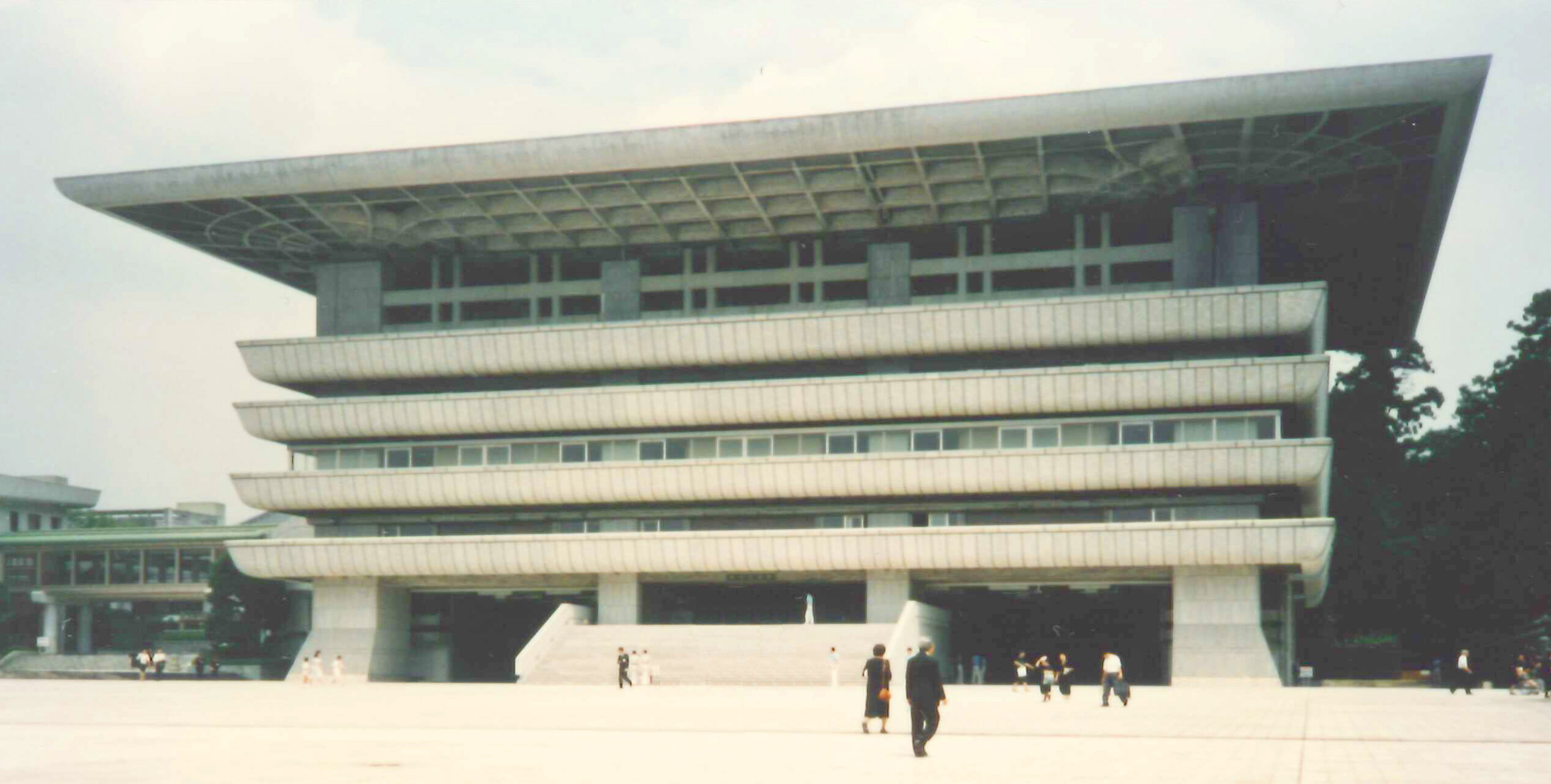
The former building of Dai-Kyakuden, (English: Grand Reception Hall), built on 1 March 1959, expanded in 1964 and demolished in September 1995. Photo circa 19 August 1993.

Nichiren Shōshū excommunicated the Soka Gakkai and the Soka Gakkai International (SGI) on 28 November 1991 due to doctrinal conflicts and the reputation of the Soka Gakkai, at that time entangled in political and financial scandals.

Soka Gakkai had emerged as a lay organization, but as early as 1956, doctrinal conflicts simmered, evidenced by the alleged declaration of the second president of Soka Gakkai, Josei Toda, to the 65th High Priest Nichijun Shonin during the reconstruction of Myoden-ji Temple, claiming the organizational leadership no longer upheld Nichiren Shoshu doctrines. Nikken Abe publicly criticized the Soka Gakkai for deviating from the traditionalist doctrines of Nichiren Shoshu. Also, Nichiren Shoshu denounced "a whole series of scandals and anti-social behavior, such as the obstacle to certain publications or the affair of listening to the telephone conversations of the honorary president of the PC. On a more recent date, we can mention (. ..) his involvement in the political and stock market scandal Recruit, in illegal transactions on Renoir paintings and in a case of false income declarations".

These and other conflicts resulted in a complete and formal disassociation of the two sides after Nichiren Shōshū excommunicated the leaders of the Sōka Gakkai and stripped it of its status as a lay organization of Nichiren Shōshū in 1991. Ultimately, Daisaku Ikeda was excommunicated from the role of Sokoto or lay leader by High Priest Nikken, while the formal decree of excommunication invalidated the tax exempt status of Soka Gakkai under Japanese law due to its lack of temple affiliation.

On 30 September 1997, Nichiren Shōshū excommunicated all Soka Gakkai International members.

== Criticism ==
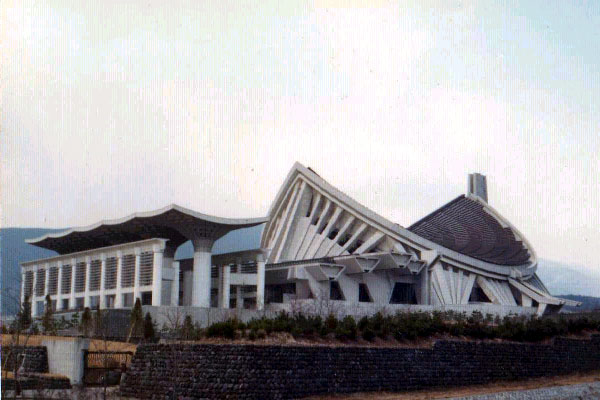
The Shohondo hall of the Taiseki-ji temple. Constructed in 1972, demolished in 1998.

Various criticisms of Nichiren Shoshu are often published by its former lay organization, the Soka Gakkai. In its dissenting group Soka Spirit that questions and opposes Nichiren Shoshu doctrines, the Soka Gakkai rejects both the priestly authority of the High Priest of Taisekiji and the intermediary role of the Nichiren Shoshu priesthood as relevant or necessary in practicing Buddhism for a contemporary age.

Former practitioners often cite the orthodox beliefs of Nichiren Shoshu that places great emphasis on religious piety and religious ceremonies that prohibit tolerance for other cultures and foreign religious values under an atmosphere of orthodoxy. Chief among this is the prohibition of members to attend other religious venues, the purchase of Buddhist religious articles outside of its local Temple branches or the Taisekiji vicinity. Most significant is the alleged monopoly of Nichiren Buddhism through the devotional Tozan pilgrimages to the Dai Gohonzon. The donations, while voluntary, are granted for Toba memorial tablets, Kakocho ancestral books and the overwhelming Japanese conservative customs and mannerisms associated with Buddhist practice.

Furthermore, allegations of accepting Ofuda and Omamori Shinto talismans during the Second World War to support the Japanese Emperor Showa's patriotic war effort to maintain immunity from persecution was supposedly contradictory to its doctrinal beliefs to reject other religions, though both the temple priesthood and Tsunesaburo Makiguchi in his writings at the time did lend support for the world war effort as dictated by the Japanese Emperor. The first talisman dedicated to the solar goddess Amaterasu-Omikami enshrined at the Dai-Kyakuden Hall was installed by the Japanese Imperial Army.

The most prominent of these criticisms is the posthumous elevation of the High Priest of Nichiren Shoshu as the sole inheritor of the enlightened entity of the Buddha called the "Living Essence" or the Heritage of the Law, referring to its doctrinal office of Taisekiji while the Soka Gakkai claims to be the inheritor of Heritage of the Faith without any distinct priestly lineage. A longstanding negative sentiment is crystallized in the destruction of the Sho-hondo and other Soka Gakkai funded buildings which came from member donations during the 1970s. In addition, the alleged manipulation of Nichiren's writings called Gosho by either abbreviating or manipulating their interpretative meaning to suit a hierarchical sentiment is leveled as a criticism against the priesthood and its school.

Outside researchers such as author Daniel Metraux view the issue of perceived authority as the central point of the conflict:

"The priesthood claims that it is the sole custodian of religious authority and preservation of dogma, while the Soka Gakkai leadership claims that the scriptural writings of Nichiren, not the priesthood, represent the ultimate source of authority, and that any individual with deep faith in Nichiren’s teachings can attain enlightenment without the assistance of a Nichiren Shōshū priest".

== See also ==
- Nichiren Shū
