= Namu Myōhō Renge Kyō =

Japanese Buddhist mantra

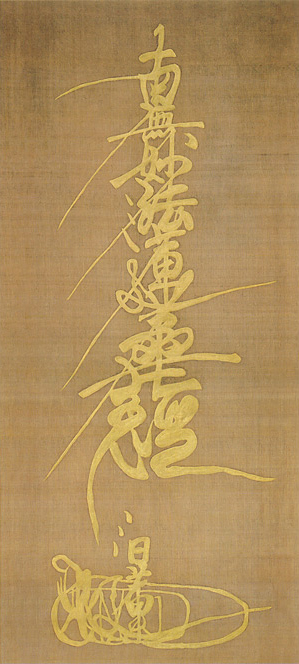
An inscription of Namu Myōhō Renge Kyō by Japanese artisan Hasegawa Tohaku. Toyama, Japan. Circa Momoyama period, 1568.

Namu Myōhō Renge Kyō (Note: Sometimes truncated phonetically as Nam Myōhō Renge Kyō) (Kanji: 南無妙法蓮華経) is a Japanese sacred phrase chanted within all forms of Nichiren Buddhism. In English, it means "Devotion to the Mystic Dharma of the Lotus Flower Sutra" or "Homage to the Sublime Dharma of the Lotus Sutra".

The words Myōhō Renge Kyō refer to the Japanese title of the Lotus Sūtra (Sanskrit: Saddharmapuṇḍarīkasūtra). The phrase is referred to as the Daimoku (題目) , meaning title, and was publicly taught by the Japanese Buddhist priest Nichiren on 28 April 1253 atop Mount Kiyosumi, now memorialized by Seichō-ji temple in Kamogawa, Chiba prefecture, Japan.

In Nichiren Buddhism, the practice of prolonged Daimoku chanting is referred to as Shōdai (唱題). Nichiren Buddhist believers claim that the purpose of chanting is to reduce suffering by eradicating negative karma and all karmic retribution, while also advancing the practitioner on the path to perfect and complete awakening.

== History ==
Lotus Sutra devotion had a long history in China and Japan (especially in the Tiantai school), but it was generally associated with chanting whole chapters of the sutra, or the whole sutra itself, not simply the title. A homage similar to the daimoku is found in Chinese ritual texts belonging to the Tiantai school, such as in the Lotus Repentance of Zhiyi, the founder of the tradition. However, these homage phrases are only recited once as part of the entire ritual, not as a repetitive chant.

The Fahua ch'uan-chi, a Tang dynasty Chinese Lotus Sutra devotional text, contains at least two stories of individuals being saved from hell by reciting "Námó miàofǎ liánhuá jīng", but this is just a single recitation, and the text does not discuss its use as a chant used in continuous religious practice.

=== In Heian period Japan ===
The actual practice of chanting the Daimoku, or the title of the Lotus Sutra (in Japanese: Namu-myōhō-renge-kyō), was popularized by the Kamakura-period Buddhist reformer Nichiren (1222–1282). While often assumed to be his original innovation, historical evidence suggests that the practice existed in Japan long before his time. Early references to Daimoku chanting appear in Heian period (794–1185) texts, such as Shui ōjōden and Hokke hyakuza kikigakisho, where it was associated with devotion to the Lotus Sutra. Nichiren, however, transformed this practice by giving it a comprehensive doctrinal foundation and advocating it as the sole means of salvation in the degenerate age of the Final Dharma (mappō).

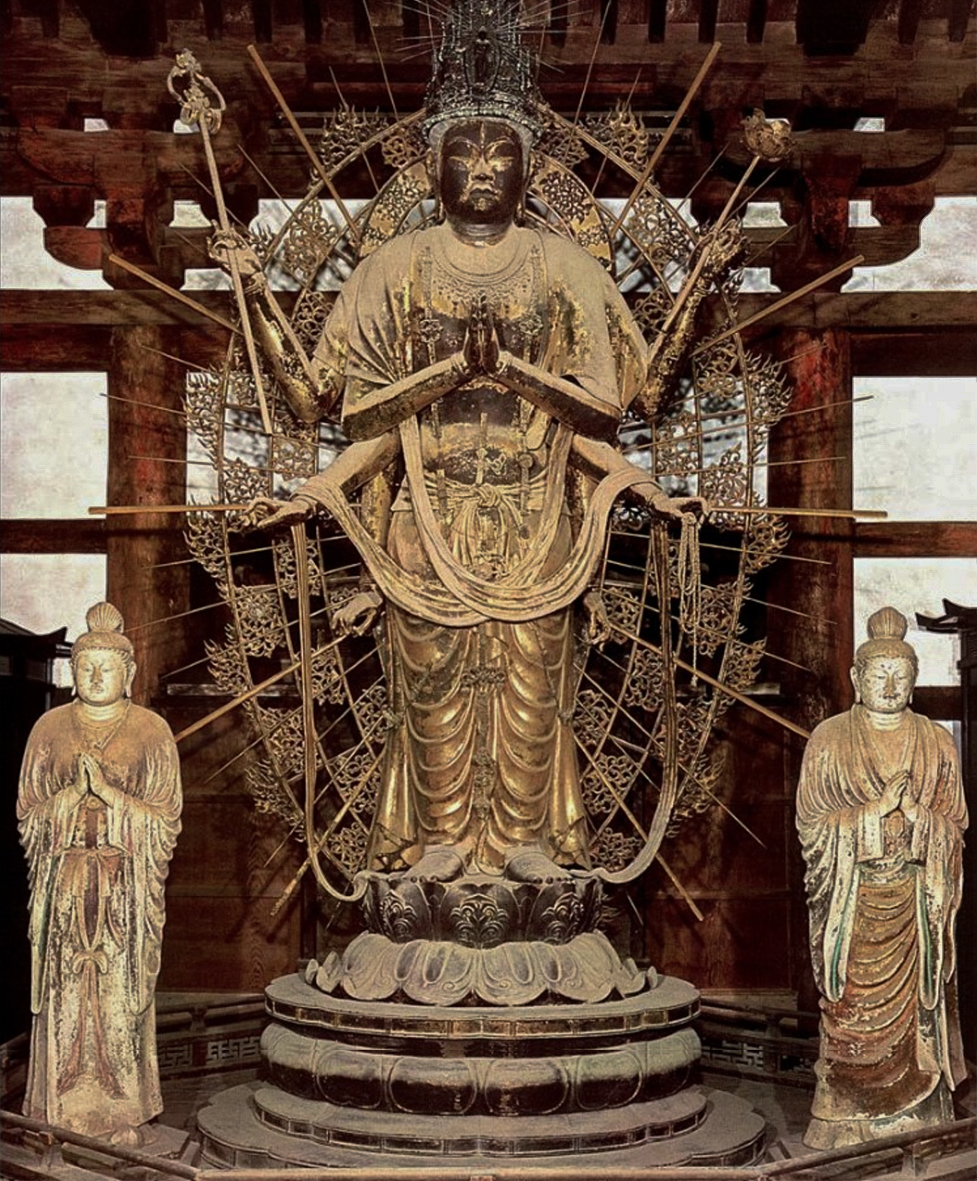
Fukūken-saku Kannon in the Hokke-dō (Lotus Sutra Ritual Hall) of Tōdai-ji. Kannon (Guanyin), who appears in the Lotus Sutra, was often associated with the daimoku during the Heian period.

The idea that the title of the sutra held the power of the entire sutra could have been influenced by the fact that Zhiyi, the Chinese founder of the Tiantai school, had explained in his commentary to the Lotus Sutra (Fahua Xuan Yi) that the title of the sutra contained within it the entire meaning of the whole sutra, and that it signified the sublime (miao 妙) nature of ultimate reality itself.

The earliest authenticated use of the Japanese daimoku dates back to 881, in a prayer composed by Sugawara no Michizane for his deceased parents. In this prayer, the daimoku was actually paired with an homage to Kannon bodhisattva (as Namu Kanzeon Bosatsu, Namu myōhō renge kyō). Similarly, the Kachio engi (possibly dated to the 9th century) states that the monk Shōnyo taught the chanting of Namu-myōhō-renge-kyō and Namu Amida Nyorai.

By the late 10th and early 11th centuries, the daimoku was being chanted on the Tendai school stronghold of Mt. Hiei as an expression of devotion to the Dharma. There is evidence of the Daimoku's use in sutra burials, inscriptions on statues, and other religious practices, indicating its growing significance in both monastic and aristocratic circles. These examples are often associated with Amida Buddha or Kannon. For example, a Kannon statue installed in 1012 at Koryuji temple included inscriptions of the daimoku along with the nembutsu (Namu Amida Butsu).

The Kūkan (Contemplation of Emptiness), a text (questionably) attributed to the Tendai monk Genshin (942–1017), states that those who "abhor the impure Saha world and aspires to the Pure Land of Utmost Bliss should chant Namu Amida Butsu, Namu Myōhō Renge Kyō, Namu Kanzeon Bosatsu", which can be interpreted as honoring correspondingly the three jewels of Buddhism. Similar passages which contain the daimoku as a devotional chant is found in the works of Genshin's disciples, like Kakuun (953–1007), and Kakuchō (952/960–1034).

By the late 12th century, the daimoku began to be chanted repeatedly, similar to the nembutsu (chanting of Amida Buddha's name), as seen in records of rituals and ceremonies from this time. Stories from setsuwa (Buddhist tales) further illustrate the daimoku's role as a simple yet powerful practice, accessible even to those with limited knowledge of Buddhism. These tales emphasize the Lotus Sutra's salvific power, suggesting that even uttering its title could form a bond with the Dharma and lead to salvation. However, the practice was not yet as widespread among the common people, remaining more prominent among monks and the nobility. In a story found in the Hokke hyakuza kikigakisho, the daimoku (here: Namu ichijō myōhō renge kyō) is recited by an illiterate Chinese monk who could not learn to chant the Lotus Sutra itself, and the practice later saves him from hell.

Furthermore, during this period, a class of people known as "title chanters" (daimyōsō) emerged, who intoned the daimoku at public lectures and other ceremonies. These figures may have helped spread the practice before the rise of Nichiren Buddhism.

The 12th century practice of the daimoku was often paired with the nembutsu or associated with Pure Land Buddhism. One example from the early 12th century is in the Shui ōjōden (Gleanings of Biographies of People born in the Pure Land), which contains a description of the practice in the context of Pure Land devotion. The text describes how Tachibana no Morisuke (d. 1096) is said to have recited the name of Amida Buddha and the title of the Lotus Sutra every evening while facing West. In another example, the artist Unkei (1150–1223) describes how during a ritual copying of the Lotus Sutra, various devotees would perform three bows for each line of the sutra he copied. With each bow they would recite the daimoku and the nembutsu. Unkei also mentions how local lay supporters of the project also chanted the nembutsu and the daimoku several thousand times.

The title of the Lotus Sutra was also used by the Tendai school for esoteric yoga, especially in the Lotus Ritual (Hokke Hō), an esoteric Buddhist rite based on the Lotus Sutra and Chinese Esoteric Buddhism. This rite made use of mandalas, mantras and dhāraṇīs, including the dhāraṇīs taught in the Lotus Sutra, as well as the daimoku.

==== The Shuzenji-ketsu ====
One medieval Tendai oral teachings text (kuden homon), the Shuzenji-ketsu (Doctrinal Decisions of Hsiu-ch'an-ssu), contains an example of daimoku chanting. The Shuzenji-ketsu recommends the chanting of daimoku as a deathbed practice, stating that this practice is a "Dharma container" which can include within it the threefold contemplation of Tiantai. The text mentions that "through the workings of the three powers of the Wondrous Dharma [Dharma, Buddha, Faith], one shall at once attain enlightened wisdom and will not receive a body bound by birth and death." The text also teaches daimoku recitation as a method of contemplating the three thousand realms in one thought (ichinen sanzen), again at the time of death, and pairs it with recitation of the name of Kannon bodhisattva.

The text also teaches daimoku recitation as part of a contemplative rite described as follows:

You should make pictures of images representing the ten realms and enshrine them in ten places. Facing each image, you should, one hundred times, bow with your body, chant Namu Myoho-renge-kyo with your mouth, and contemplate with your mind. When you face the image of hell, contemplate that its fierce flames are themselves precisely emptiness, precisely provisional existence, and precisely the middle, and so on for all the images. When you face the image of the Buddha, contemplate its essence being precisely the threefold truth. You should carry out this practice for one time period in the morning and one time period in the evening. The Great Teacher Zhiyi secretly conferred this Dharma essential for the beings of dull faculties in the last age. If one wishes to escape from birth and death and attain bodhi, then first he should employ this practice. – Shuzenji-ketsu, trans. Jacqueline Stone

The dating of the Shuzenji-ketsu is uncertain and it has provoked much scholarly controversy in Japan. Scholars disagree on whether the work influenced or is influenced by Nichiren, as well as whether it predates him, post-dates Nichiren, or whether it emerged independently at around the same time. Shimaji Daito (1875–1927) for example, places it in the cloistered rule period (1086–1185). Tamura Yoshiro meanwhile dates the work to 1250–1300. Takagi Yutaka meanwhile agrees with the view that the text is from the late Heian period and that it demonstrate's the era's concern for a proper death. Many scholars have noted that devotion to Amitabha and the Lotus Sutra were key elements of the Buddhism of the Heian period, where they were seen as complementary. The Tendai school at mount Hiei was known for a schedule of practice which focused on Lotus Sutra rites in the morning and Pure Land practices in the evening. This custom was later described through the motto "daimoku in the morning and nembutsu in the evening."

=== Nichiren ===
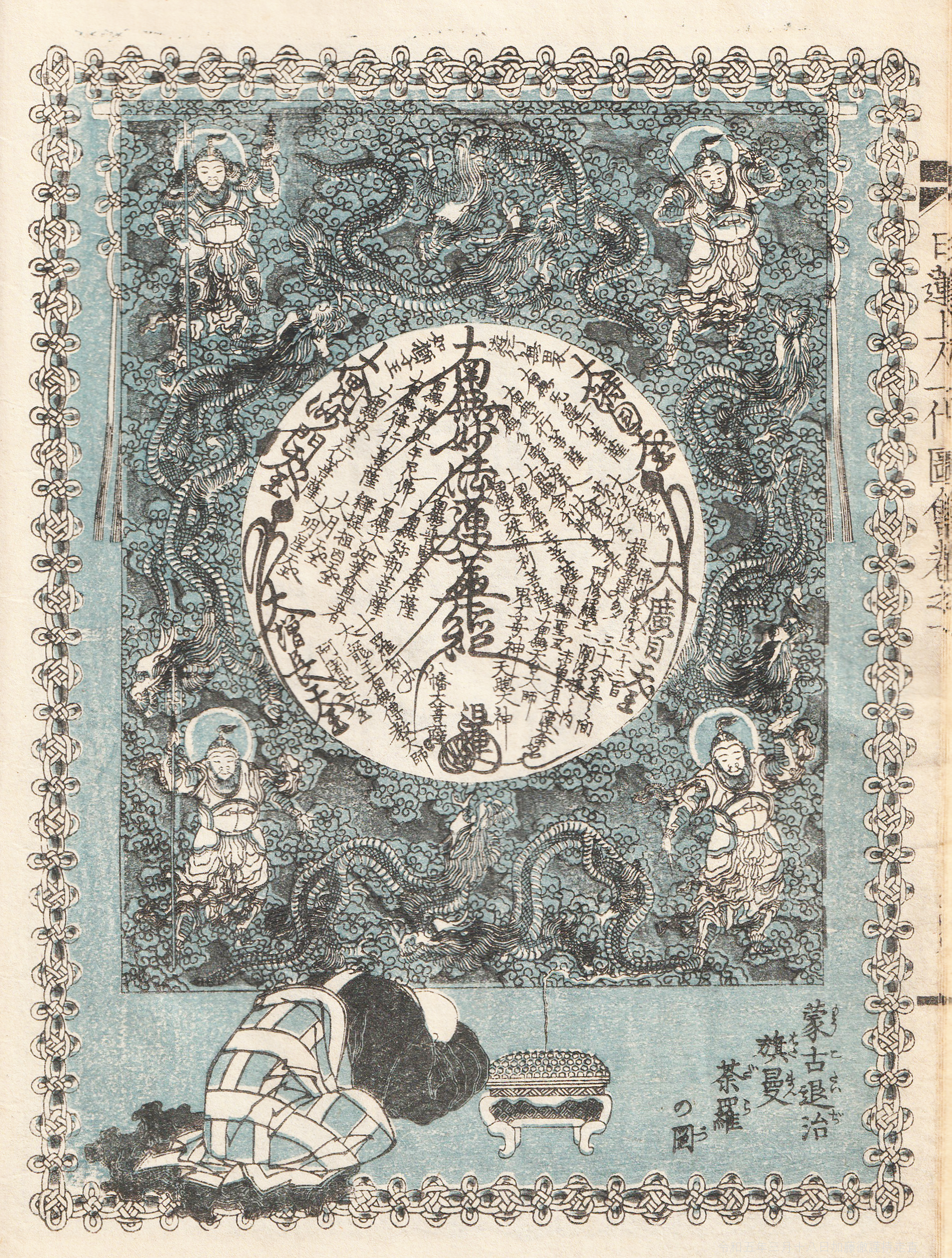
Nichiren bowing before the Gohonzon, a calligraphic mandala depicting the Daimoku

The Tendai Lotus Sutra revivalist Nichiren (1222–1282) is known today as the greatest promoter of the daimoku in the history of Japanese Buddhism. Nichiren saw the repetition of the daimoku as the supreme and highest practice, since the title of the sutra contained the entire Buddhadharma and the seed of Buddhahood itself. Nichiren frequently quotes passages from the Lotus Sutra in which the Buddha declared the sutra to be his highest teaching, such as "among those sutras the Lotus is the foremost!", and "this sutra is king of the sutras." Nichiren writes in his Kanjinhonzonshō:

The bodhisattva practices cause the virtues of the Buddha. The practices and virtues of Sakyamuni, the World-honored One, are contained in the Five Characters: Myōhō Renge Kyō. When we keep these Five Characters, we shall automatically receive the merits that the Buddha obtained by his practices.

Nichiren also writes that the daimoku has the following meanings:

1) the name of the combination of the Dharma and its simile, 2) the name of the reality of all things, 3) the name of the teaching of the One Vehicle, 4) the name of faith in the Original Buddha, and 5) the name of the supremacy of the teaching.

According to Stone, who draws on Takagi Yutaka's work, Nichiren's daimoku practice was influenced by three key elements: earlier Heian-period daimoku practices, medieval Tendai doctrine (as seen in texts like the Shuzenji-ketsu), and the nembutsu tradition popularized by Hōnen. Nichiren synthesized these influences to create a unique and exclusive practice centered on the daimoku, which became the core of his new school of Buddhism. Nichiren gives a detailed interpretation of the daimoku in his Ongi kuden and in other works. His interpretations are influenced by the writings of Tiantai Zhiyi. For Nichiren, reciting the daimoku was equivalent to reciting the entire Lotus Sutra. He believed that the merit and enlightenment of the Buddha would be "spontaneously transferred" to those who embraced and chanted the daimoku. This would erase their evil karma and allow them to attain Buddhahood in this very body. Jacqueline Stone writes that "Nichiren stressed salvation through faith rather than through meditative insight, and this position also represents orthodoxy for the major Nichiren denominations today." However, Nichiren also held that the practice of daimoku recitation could purify the mind and lead to insight. For example, in Becoming a Buddha in One Lifetime (Issho jobutsu sho), Nichiren writes:

Even right now, the deluded mind in a single thought-moment of ignorance is an unpolished mirror. But if one polishes it, it will surely become the bright mirror that is the true suchness of the Dharma nature. Profoundly arouse the mind of faith and day and night, morning and evening polish it without neglect. How should one polish it? Simply chanting Namu-myōhō-renge-kyō is what is called polishing.

Nichiren's Kanjin honzon shō, one of his most significant works, established the doctrinal foundation for chanting the daimoku as a practice of "mind contemplation" (觀心) suitable for the final Dharma age. In this text, Nichiren taught that the awakened Śākyamuni Buddha's accumulated practices and resulting merits are fully contained within the five characters of the daimoku, and are immediately transferred to the practitioner upon chanting. Consequently, one can achieve the merits of the six perfections without pursuing each practice individually. The Kanjin honzon shō also introduced the concept of the “great maṇḍala” (daimandara), a calligraphic representation of the Lotus assembly inspired by esoteric iconography. Nichiren created over 120 examples of this maṇḍala, in which the daimoku is prominently inscribed down the center, flanked by the names of Śākyamuni and Many Jewels Buddha, reflecting the scene described in the Lotus Sūtra where these Buddhas sit together in the jeweled stūpa. Nichiren taught that through faith in the Lotus Sūtra and the chanting of the daimoku, the devotee "enters" this maṇḍala, thereby participating in the enlightened reality of the primordial Buddha.

Nichiren's emphasis on daimoku as an exclusive practice paralleled (and may have been influenced by) the development of Hōnen's exclusive nembutsu. Although Tendai and other Buddhist traditions included recitation-based practices (usually based on nembutsu, mantras or whole sutras, like the Heart Sutra or Amitabha Sutra), Nichiren elevated the chanting of the daimoku to an exclusive and universal method of attaining enlightenment. Nichiren claimed that the daimoku was the only method to happiness and salvation suited for the age of Dharma decline, while other practices were useless. As such, mixing the daimoku with other practices (as the Buddhists of the Heian period had done) was seen by Nichiren as being “like mixing rice with excrement.” This exclusive stance has been seen as intolerant and radical by some modern scholars, but it was actually a common feature of Kamakura Buddhism, and can be seen in Hōnen for example. What was unique to Nichiren however was the direct confrontational stance which he took against other sects (which was the basis for the sect's shakubuku proselytism).

Within the early Nichiren community, interpretations of the daimoku practice varied, with some followers viewing it as an expression of faith, while others understood it as a meditative discipline or a means of achieving worldly benefits. His doctrine integrated elements of Tendai philosophy, esoteric Buddhism, and contemporary concerns about the age of mappō, which contributed to its wide appeal.

== Analysis of the phrase ==
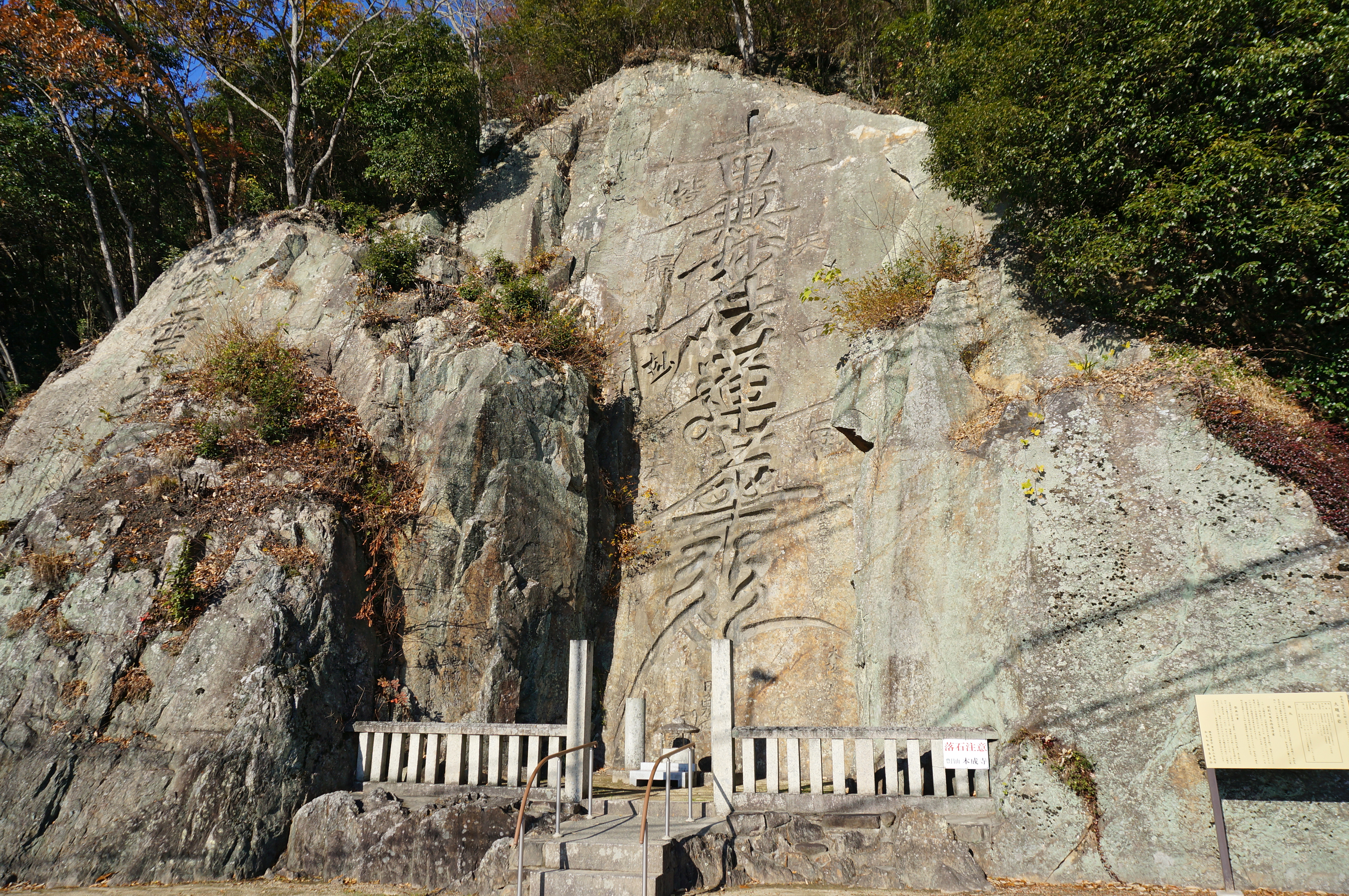
Rock carved with the daimoku, in Wake, Okayama prefecture, Japan

Namu is used in Buddhism as a prefix expressing taking refuge in a Buddha or similar object of veneration. Among varying Nichiren sects, the phonetic use of Nam versus Namu is a linguistic but not a dogmatic issue, due to common contractions and u is devoiced in many varieties of Japanese words. In this mantra, the Japanese drop the "u" sound when chanting at a fast pace, but write "Namu", seeing as it is impossible to contract the word into 'Nam' in their native script.

Namu Myōhō Renge Kyō (南無妙法蓮華經, Chinese: námó miàofǎ liánhuá jīng) consists of the following words:

- Namu 南無 "devoted to", an adaptation of Sanskrit námo, the form taken in this context by the word whose citation form is námas, meaning: 'obeisance, reverential salutation, adoration'.
- Myōhō 妙法 "exquisite law", "Sublime Dharma" (Sanskrit: Saddharma)
  - Myō 妙, from Middle Chinese mièw, "strange, mystery, miracle, cleverness" (cf. Mandarin miào); which translates the Sanskrit Sad- (from sat-, true, real)
  - Hō 法, from Middle Chinese pjap, "Dharma, law, principle, doctrine" (cf. Mand. fǎ)
- Renge-kyō 蓮華經 "Lotus Flower Sutra (i.e. Lotus Sutra)"
  - Renge 蓮華 "Dharma Flower", i.e. the White Lotus, Sanskrit: Pundarika
    - Ren 蓮, from Middle Chinese len, "lotus" (cf. Mand. lián)
    - Ge 華, from Middle Chinese xwæ, "flower" (cf. Mand. huā)
  - Kyō 経, from Middle Chinese kjeng (cf. Mand. jīng), Sanskrit: "sutra"

=== Exegesis ===
According to Tiantai Zhiyi and Nichiren, each of the words of the Lotus Sutra's title has a specific meaning:

- Myōhō (Sublime Dharma): Zhiyi's Profound Meaning of Lotus Sutra (Fahua Xuan-yi) says that the term "sublime" (miao 妙) refers to ultimate reality itself, i.e. Suchness, which is the perfect interfusion of the three truths. For Zhiyi, the "sublime" teaching is all-encompassing, integrating all teachings within it, and indeed, all phenomena (dharmas). Nichiren understands Myō to mean "opening", "revealing", "to open". He quotes the Lotus Sutra which says, "This sutra opens the door of expedient teachings and reveals the true aspect of reality." Nichiren says this means the sutra is like the key to a great treasure storehouse (Buddhahood itself). He also says it means "perfection" since it is the perfect and supreme teaching of the Buddha.
- Renge (Lotus Flower): The white lotus flower (Nelumbo nucifera) symbolically represents the supreme Dharma. Zhiyi sees the term "lotus flower" as an allegory for the relationship between the relative three vehicles and the ultimate One Vehicle. Just like the flower blossom exists for the sake of the fruit, the relative teachings of the three vehicles exist only because of the One Vehicle. Similarly, the sutra's trace teaching of skillful means exists because of its origin teaching (the Buddha's infinite lifespan). Thus, the term "lotus flower" symbolizes the entire teaching of the sutra.
- Kyō (Sutra): "Sutra" literally means "thread" (cf. suture), and refers to all the teachings of the Buddha. Nichiren writes: "Within this single character Kyō are contained all the sutras in the entire universe. It is like the wish-granting jewel that contains within it all manner of treasures, or the vastness of space that encompasses all phenomena."

== Alternative forms and practices ==
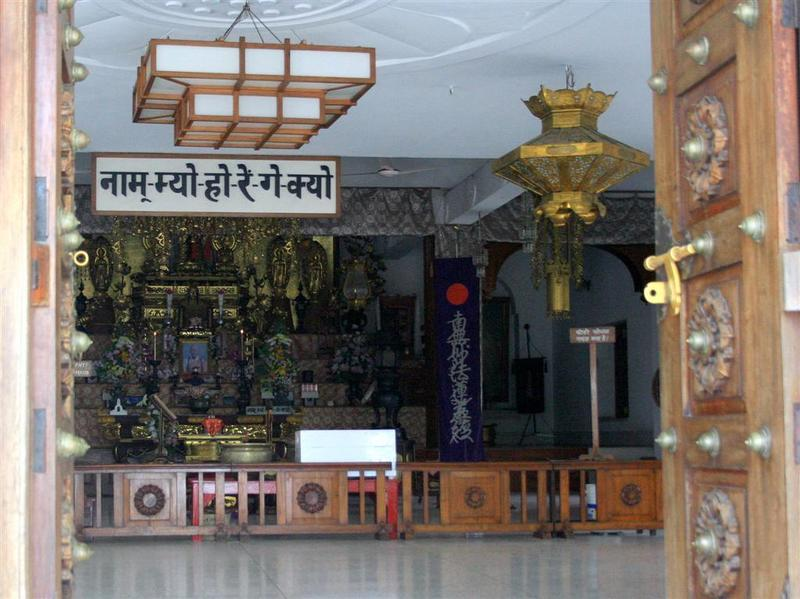
Daimoku in Devanagari script in a monastery in India

In some Tendai liturgy, the Lotus Sutra is praised with different phrases.

In the Tiantai Manual for the Dharma Flower Samadhi Repentance Rite (Fahua Sanmei Chanyi 法華三昧懺儀, Taisho no. 1941) composed by Zhiyi, one finds the following homage to the sutra:

一心奉請: 南無大乘妙法蓮華經 (心想甚深。祕密法藏。悉現在前。受我供養)。

This homage passage (found in a group of similar passages paying homage to various Buddhas and bodhisattvas) reads: "With single-minded devotion, I respectfully entreat Homage to the Great Vehicle Wonderful Dharma Lotus Sūtra." The homage (Chinese: 南無大乘妙法蓮華經; pinyin: Nán mó dà chéng miào fǎ lián huá jīng, Jp. romanization: Namu Daijō Myōhō Renge Kyō) is followed by the following instructions "Visualize the profound and secret Dharma treasury fully appearing before one to receive the offerings."

This classic Tiantai Buddhist ritual emphasizes reverence, repentance, and dedication to enlightenment. Practitioners begin by recognizing the nature of all phenomena as inherently empty yet manifesting through karmic conditions. They engage in reverent worship, bowing to Shakyamuni Buddha, past and future Buddhas, and prominent bodhisattvas such as Mañjusri and Samantabhadra. The ritual incorporates a detailed repentance process for transgressions committed through the six sensory faculties (eyes, ears, nose, tongue, body, and mind), acknowledging the karmic consequences of sensory attachments. Practitioners express deep remorse, resolve to abstain from harmful actions, and dedicate their practice to the welfare of all beings. The ritual concludes with invoking the Buddhas and bodhisattvas to teach the Dharma and guide sentient beings toward liberation.

Meanwhile, a Tendai 9th century Hokke Senbo (法華懺法) contains an identical daimoku homage:

南無妙法蓮華經 (pronounced: Namo Beuhō Renga Kei)

Tendai sources also contain the alternative daimoku chant:

Namu ichijō myōhō renge kyō (Homage to the One Vehicle Sutra, the Wondrous Dharma Lotus Blossom)

Another alternative homage reads:

Namu byōdō dai e ichijō myōhō renge kyō (南無平等大會一乘妙法蓮華經)

Homage to the Great Assembly of Equality, the One Vehicle, the Wondrous Dharma Lotus Sutra.

Tendai Buddhism generally does not use this phrase as a repetitive chant, as the Daimoku is used in Nichiren Buddhism. However, there is a related practice called the Method for Prostrating to the Dharma Flower Sūtra (禮法華經儀式, Taisho no. 1944) observed today by both monastics and lay practitioners. This rite was famously practiced by the Tendai master Ennin before his trip to China. It can be performed in three forms: long, medium, and short. The long form involves prostrating to each character of the entire sutra, while the medium form applies this to a selected chapter. The short form, which is more commonly practiced, involves prostrating to the characters of the sūtra's title, sometimes accompanied by chanting Namu. During this practice, a dedication such as "With single-minded devotion, I pay homage to the Wonderful Dharma Lotus Sūtra, paying homage to the Dharma Jewel of the character Myō (妙)" is recited.

The title of the Lotus Sutra in Sanskrit is Saddharmapuṇḍarīkasūtra, thus a Sanskrit reconstruction of the homage would be:

namaḥ saddharmapuṇḍarīkasūtrāya

The Tenshō Kōtai Jingūkyō religion uses an alternative version of the mantra – Na Myōhō Renge Kyō (名妙法連結経).

=== Mantra ===
In the Kaimokushō (Liberation from Blindness), Nichiren cites a Lotus Sutra mantra. According to Nichiren, this is the "mantra at the core of the Saddharmapuṇḍarīkasūtra" which was discovered by the vajracharya Śubhakarasiṃha "in an iron tower of South India". The Sanskrit mantra is as follows:

namaḥ samyaksambuddhānām

oṃ a aṁ aḥ

sarvabuddhājña-cakṣurbhyām gagana saṁsvā rakṣanī

saddharmapuṇḍarīkasūtram

jā hūṃ ho vajrarakṣaman hūṁ svāhā

== References in visual media ==
- 1947 – It was used in the 1940s in India to commence the Interfaith prayer meetings of Mahatma Gandhi, followed by verses of the Bhagavad Gita.
- 1958 – The mantra also appears in the 1958 American romantic film The Barbarian and the Geisha, where it was recited by a Buddhist priest during a cholera outbreak.
- 1958 – Japanese film Nichiren to Mōko Daishūrai (English: Nichiren and the Great Mongol Invasion) is a 1958 Japanese film directed by Kunio Watanabe.
- 1968 – The mantra was used in the final episode of The Monkees to break Peter out of a trance.
- 1969 – The mantra is present in the original version of the film Satyricon by Federico Fellini during the grand nude jumping scene of the patricians.
- 1970 — The film Dodes'ka-den, wherein the mother of Rokuchan in the opening scene chants vigorously, and he asks for the gift of higher intelligence.
- 1973 – In Hal Ashby's film The Last Detail, an American Navy prisoner, Larry Meadows (played by Randy Quaid), being escorted by shore patrol attends a Nichiren Shoshu of America meeting where he is introduced to the mantra; the Meadows character continues to chant during the latter part of the film.
- 1979 – Nichiren is a 1979 Japanese film directed by Noboru Nakamura. Produced by Masaichi Nagata and based on Matsutarō Kawaguchi's novel. The film is known for mentioning Jinshiro Kunishige as one of the martyrs persecuted, claimed to whom the Dai Gohonzon was inscribed by Nichiren in honor of his memory.
- 1980 – In Louis Malle's acclaimed film Atlantic City, Hollis McLaren's Chrissie, the pregnant, naive hippie sister of main character Sally (Susan Sarandon) is discovered hiding, fearful and chanting the mantra after witnessing violent events.
- 1987 – The mantra is used by the underdog fraternity in the film Revenge of the Nerds II in the fake Seminole temple against the Alpha Betas.
- 1987 – In the film Innerspace, Tuck Pendleton (played by Dennis Quaid) chants this mantra repeatedly as he encourages Jack Putter to break free from his captors and charge the door of the van he is being held in.
- 1993 – American-born artist Tina Turner through her autobiographical film What's Love Got To Do With It details her conversion to Nichiren Shoshu Buddhism in 1973. In a scene, after an attempted suicide, Turner begins to chant this mantra and turns her life around.
- 1993 – In the December 9, 1993 episode of The Simpsons entitled "The Last Temptation of Homer", Homer Simpson attempts to read notes he had written on his hand to guide him during an awkward conversation with a colleague, but the notes have become smeared because of sweat. In his attempt to recite his notes, Homer unknowingly babbles the chant.
- 2008 – In the second episode of the HBO miniseries Generation Kill, USMC Sergeant Rudy Reyes chants the mantra just before giving permission to his sniper partner to open fire on an Iraqi RPG team.
- 2019 – The documentary film, Buster Williams, From Bass to Infinity, directed by Adam Kahan. Jazz bassist Buster Williams is a Buddhist practitioner and chants with his wife during the film.
- 2021 – The documentary film, Baggio: The Divine Ponytail, shows the football player Roberto Baggio meditating for recovery. He chants the mantra while meditating.

== See also ==
- Nembutsu
- Mantra of Light
- Om mani padme hum
- Kotodama
