= Nikkō Shōnin =

Senior disciple of Nichiren

Nikkō Shōnin 日興上人
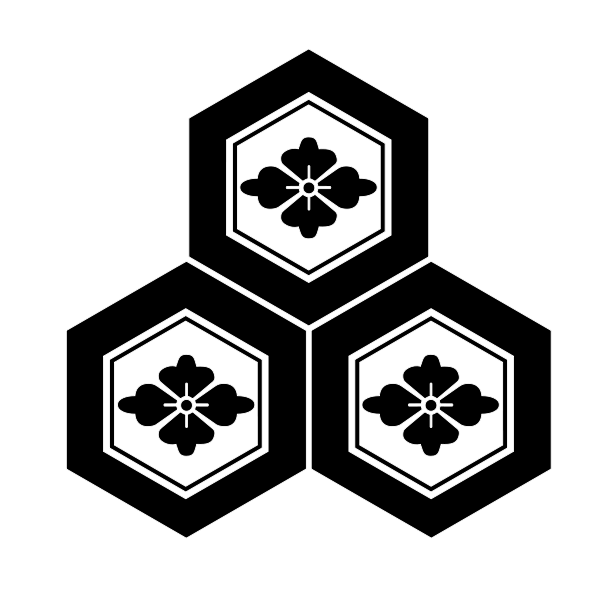
- The Tortoise crest symbol of Nikkō Shōnin.
- Title: Byakuren Ajari Nikko Shonin; Other names: Hokibo, Hōki-bō Nikkō was the Buddhist name given to Nikkō when he was thirteen and became the Daishonin’s disciple in 1258. Hōki-kō; Hawakibo; Byakuren Ajari

Personal life
- Born: 8 March 1246 Kajikazawa, Kai Province, Japan
- Died: 7 February 1333 (aged 86) Suruga Province, Japan
- Parents: Oi-no Kitsuroku; Myofuku Tsunashima
- Education: Shijuku-in Temple in Fujikawa, Iwabuchi Ichirizuka, Shizuoka; Jissoji Temple in Iwamoto, Fuji, Shizuoka Prefecture

Religious life
- Religion: Nichiren Buddhism
- School: Honmonji Buddhism
- Dharma name: Hawaki-bo Byakuren Ajari

Senior posting
- Based in: Japan
- Predecessor: Nichiren
- Successor: Nichimoku

Nikkō Shōnin (日興上人; 8 March 1246 – 7 February 1333), Buddhist name Hawaki-bō Byakuren Ajari Nikkō (伯耆房白蓮阿闍梨日興), was one of the six senior disciples of Nichiren and was the former Chief Priest of Kuon-ji temple in Mount Minobu, Japan. Various Nichiren sects in Japan claim to have been founded by Nikkō, the most prominent being Nichiren Shōshū and some lineages within Nichiren Shū.

Nikkō kept meticulous records and highly organized religious practice during his lifetime, and is responsible for much of the records that survive today. Nikkō singularly upheld the doctrine that Nichiren was the True and Eternal Buddha in the Third Age of Buddhism and therefore is considered by schools stemming from Nikkō such Nichiren Shōshū and the Soka Gakkai as the legitimate successor to the ministry and legacy of Nichiren. (Note: Other schools reject the claim that he is the chosen disciple among the six senior disciples of Nichiren: “On the twenty-fifth day of the ninth month, despite his illness, Nichiren lectured on his work On Establishing the Correct Teaching. On the eighth day of the tenth month, he designated six senior priests to act as key figures and take responsibility for propagation in their respective areas. They were, in order of their conversion, Nisshō, Nichirō, Nikkō, Nikō, Nitchō, and Nichiji”.)

Nikko established the Head Temple Taisekiji at Fujinomiya in 1290, as well as enshrining the Dai Gohonzon image. In 1332, four months before his death, he designated Nichimoku Shonin as his successor. The grave of Nikkō remains today in Kitayama Honmonji, Omosu, in Suruga Province where he lived for thirty-six years, establishing a Buddhist seminary that affiliated in the Hokke shū (法華宗) religion. The Koshi-E memorial feast of his death anniversary is commemorated on February 6 (Nichiren Shoshu O-tai-ya) and February 7 (Gosho-to-e ceremony).

== Early life ==
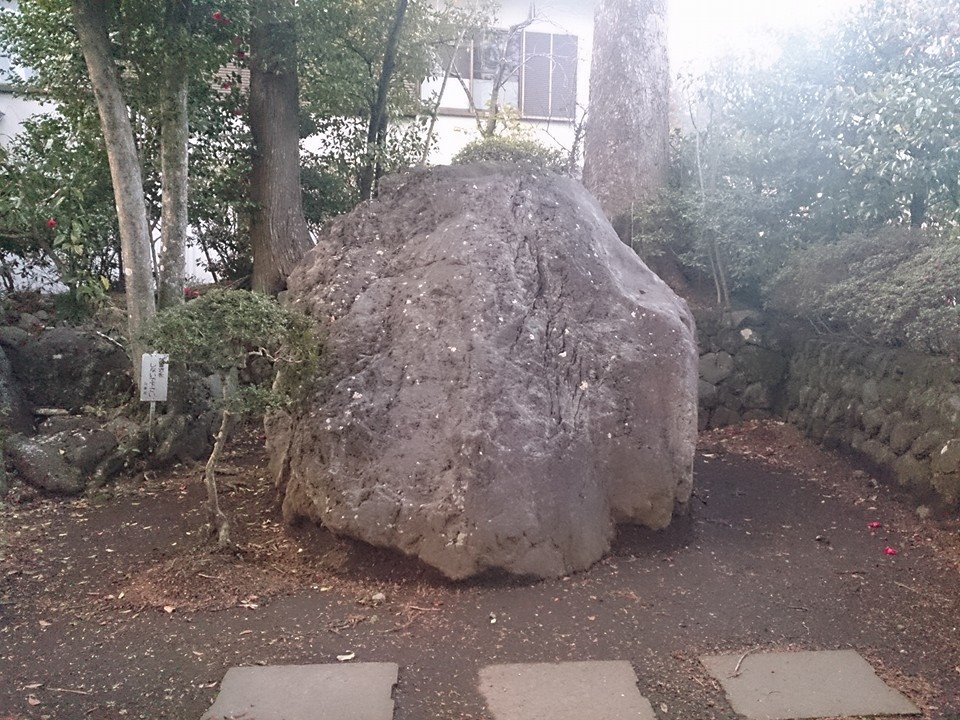
The Seppo Ishi, a boulder where Nikkō is said to have once preached at the Taisekiji Temple

Nikkō was born at Kajikazawa in Koma District of Kai Province. His father, Oi-no Kitsuroku was from Totsumi province and later moved to Kai province while maintaining his Samurai career. He died when Nikkō was a child. Nikkō's mother was Myofuku Tsunashima (née Yui) and was from what is now Shizuoka Prefecture. He was raised by his grandfather, Nyudo Yui. As a child, he entered the Tendai temple Shijuku-in, in Fujiwakabacho, Iwabuchi Ichirizuka. He took the acolyte name, "Hōki-bō" and received his education here, which as well as Tendai doctrine, included Chinese classics, Japanese literature, poetry, calligraphy, as well as other subjects.

== As Nichiren’s disciple ==
In 1257, Nichiren visited Jisso-ji Temple closely affiliated with Shijuku-in Temple where he studied various Buddhist sutras in its library for his treatise Risshō Ankoku Ron (立正安国論, English: "On Establishing the Correct teaching for the Peace of the Land"). Nikkō served Nichiren here, and vowed to become his disciple. In addition, Nikkō also accompanied Nichiren on his two exiles.

Nikkō is also credited with preserving many of Nichiren's voluminous writings. He was particularly careful to ensure the survival of Nichiren's many letters written in simple characters (Kana) for uneducated followers. He was also instrumental in gaining Nichimoku to become a junior disciple of Nichiren.

On 8 October 1282, Nikkō became one of the six senior priests whom Nichiren designated to carry on his faith after his death. “On the eighth day of the tenth month, he designated six senior priests to act as key figures and take responsibility for propagation in their respective areas. They were, in order of their conversion, Nisshō, Nichirō, Nikkō, Nikō, Nitchō, and Nichiji”. According to various Nichiren school that claim Nikko as their founder, on October 13, 1282, Nichiren further designated Nikkō the chief priest of Kuon-ji, the temple at Mt. Minobu in Yamanashi Prefecture, where Nichiren had spent the last years of his life as purportedly recorded in a transfer document called Minobu-zan Fuzoku-sho ("Document entrusting Mt. Minobu"); however, the authenticity of this document is disputed by some Nichiren schools. Later that same day, Nichiren died at Ikegami, now part of Tokyo.

At Minobu Nikkō recorded the “lectures on the Lotus Sutra” that the Daishonin gave to his disciples and compiled them as The Record of the Orally Transmitted Teachings (OTT). After the Daishonin’s passing, Nikkō Shōnin collected and copied his teacher’s writings, which he called the Gosho, or honorable writings.

Following Nichiren's 100th day funeral ceremonies, Nikkō left Ikegami on October 21 to carry Nichiren's ashes back to Mount Minobu, arriving on October 25. On the centenarian anniversary of Nichiren's death, Nikkō, the other five senior priests, and their disciples conducted a 100th-day memorial service, after which the others departed for their own territories where they were most active. Nikkō carried out his duties as chief priest of Kuon-ji, teaching disciples and looking after the laity. Central to his work was attending, cleaning and maintaining Nichiren's tomb, and collecting and cataloguing Nichiren's many writings for preservation and perpetuation.

== Isolation from other disciples ==
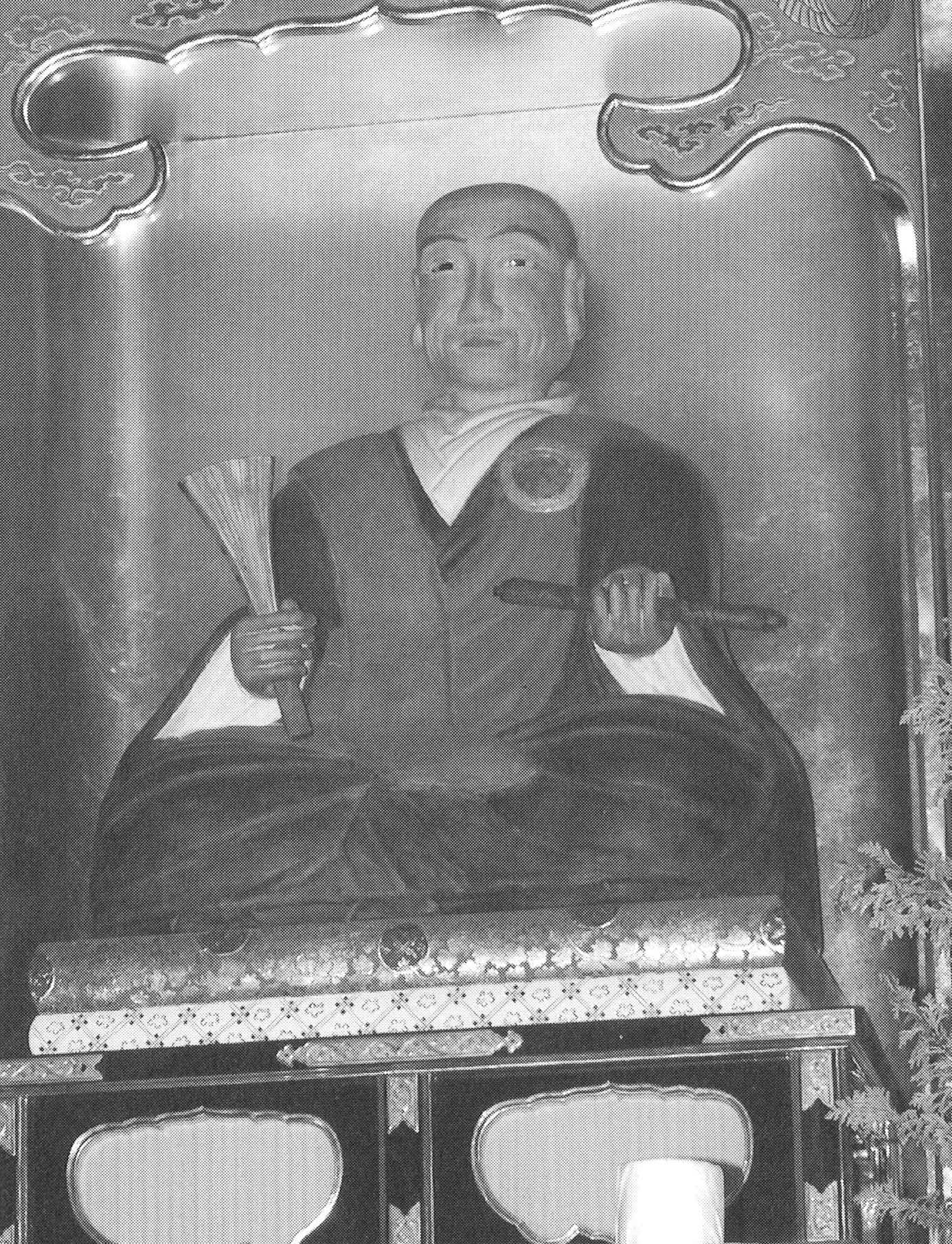
An image of Hagiri Sanenaga, patron of Shinto, enshrined at Minenyama Kuonji temple.

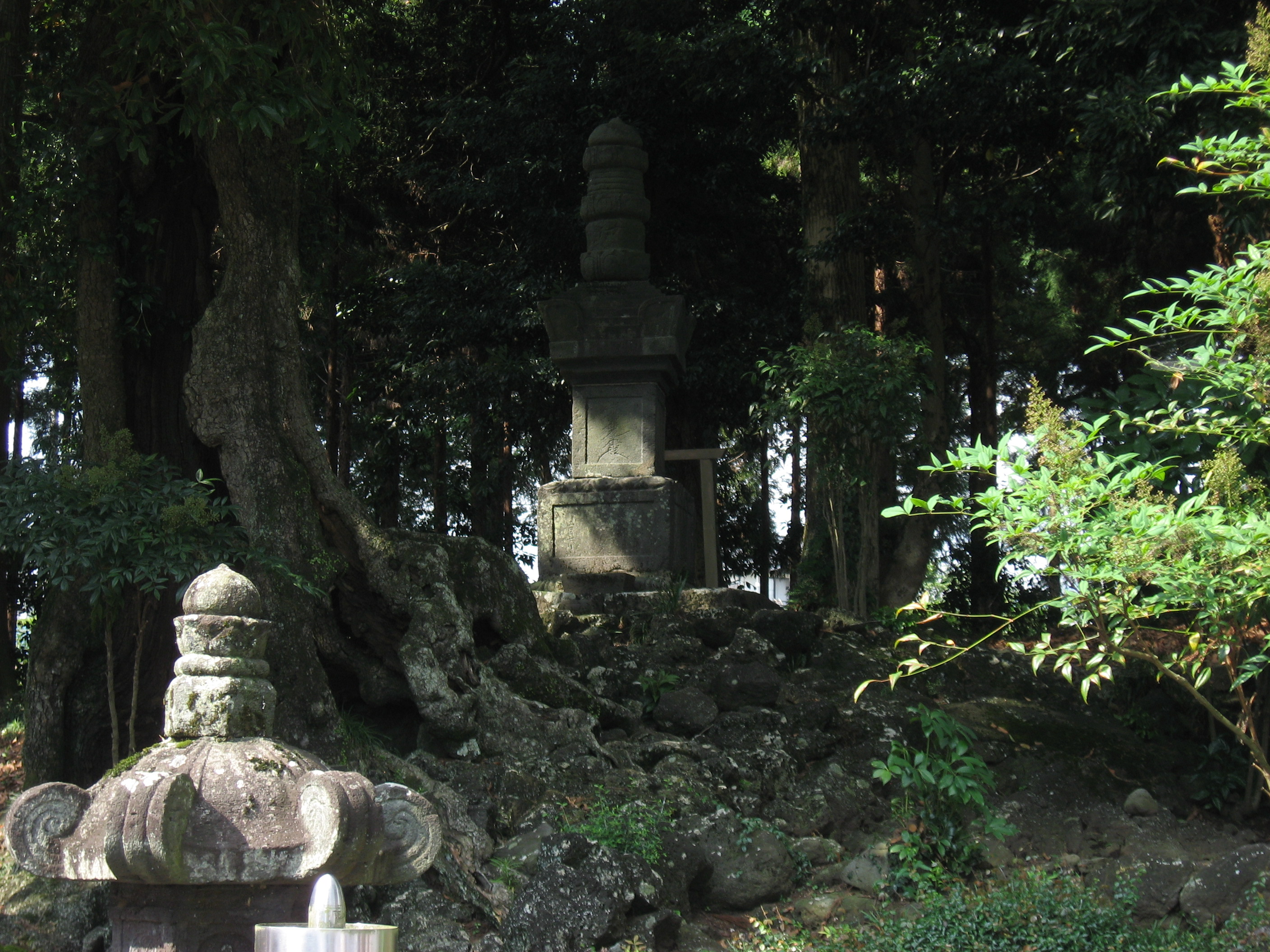
The Stupa and grave of Nikko, located in Kitayama Honmonji of the Nichiren Shu sect, in Fujinomiya, Shizuoka Prefecture.

Latter feelings of animosity and discord grew after the second death anniversary of Nichiren's 100th Day Memorial ceremony (23 January 1283) when, according to Nikko, the rotation system agreed in the "Shuso Gosenge Kiroku" (English: Record document of founder's demise) and Rembo Cho (English: Rotation Wheel System) to clean and maintain Nichiren's grave, was being abandoned by the other five senior disciples.

By the third anniversary of Nichiren's death (13 October 1284), Nikkō claimed that the other five senior priests no longer returned to Nichiren's tomb in Mount Minobu, citing the deer hoofs and other signs of neglect at the gravesite. In addition, Nikkō accused that after Nichiren's death, the other disciples slowly began to deviate from Nichiren's teachings.

Chief among these complaints was the syncretism by some of the disciples to worship images of both Shakyamuni Buddha while admonishing other disciple priests for signing their names "Tendai Shamon" of the Tendai Buddhist school in the subsequent documents notarized and sent to the Kamakura government. Furthermore, Nikko alleged that the other disciples became condescending towards some of Nichiren's writings because they were not written in Classical Chinese, but in the Japanese Katakana syllabary, which was deemed inferior at the time. Accordingly, Nikko Shonin claimed that the other senior disciples permitted Gohonzons originally inscribed by Nichiren to be buried with lay and priestly disciples, a highly controversial practice accused by the Head Temple Taisekiji to be sacrilegious and impermissible to present time.

The steward of the temple district, Hagiri Sanenaga, who had been converted by Nikkō, also began to commit unorthodox practices which Nikkō deemed to be heretical, such as the following:

1. The crafting of a standing statue of Shakyamuni Buddha as an object of worship.
2. The donation of noren shrine curtains and horses to the Mishima Taisha Shinto shrine, at the time an honorary shrine of the Hōjō-clan shogunate.
3. The procurement of bamboo lumber for the Shinto Gassan Shrine.
4. The attendance of a memorial service dedicated to the stupa of Amida Buddha along with giving monetary donations to its Nembutsu priests in Fukushi ward, Nanbu, Yamanashi Prefecture.

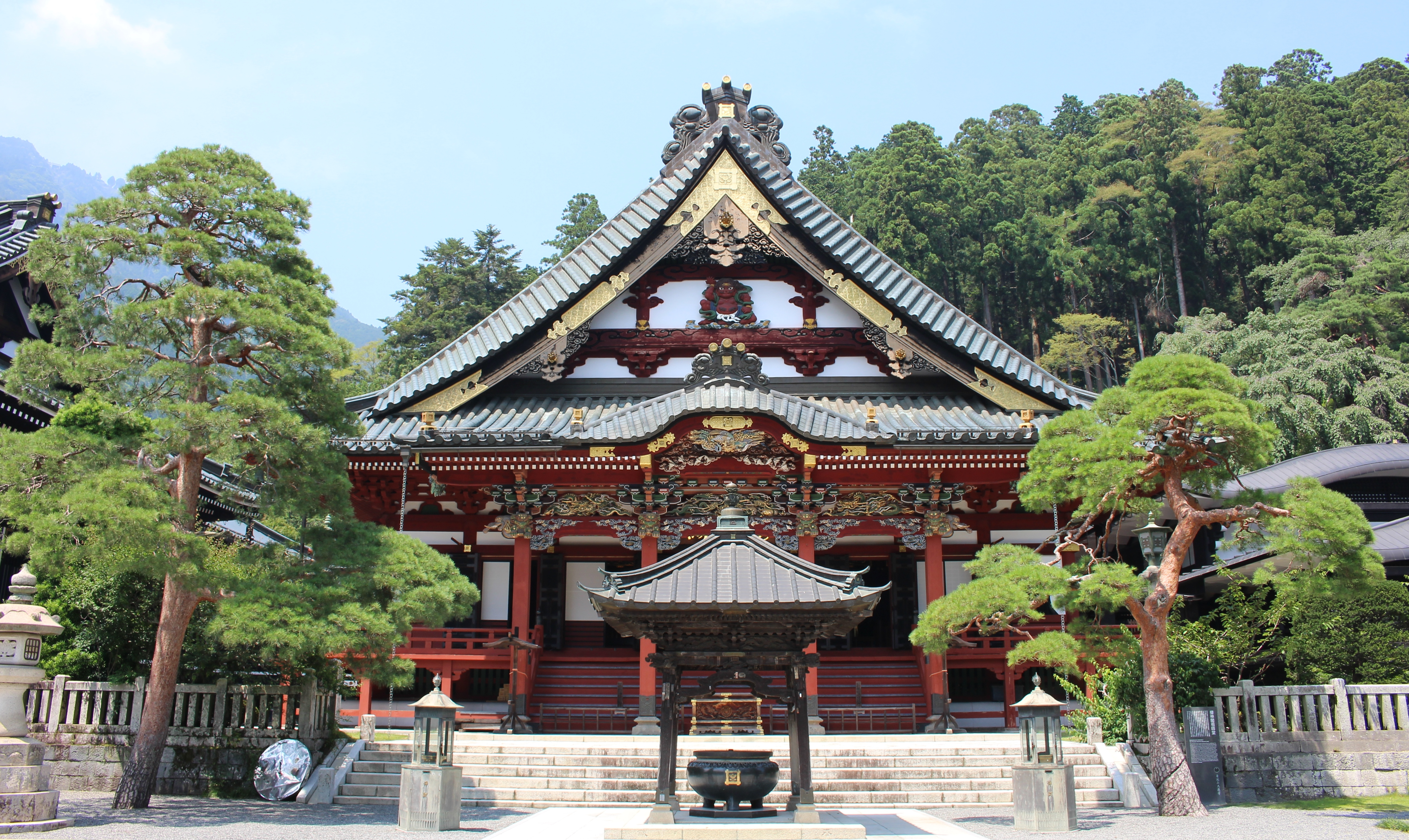
The Kuon-Ji Temple of Mount Minobu, in Yamanashi Prefecture, where Nikkō formerly administered as its chief priest.

These controversial acts received tolerance from another senior disciple, Mimbu Nikō (民 部 日 向, 1253–1314) to be acceptable due to having been done ordinarily with the knowledge of Nichiren while he was alive. Accordingly, Hagiri Sanenaga provided his own personal reason that it was customary for his political family to make homage to the Shinto shrine of the Kamakura Shogunate, as well as reasoning that he had provided monetary donations to other Buddhist schools even when Nichiren himself was alive.

Such developments eventually led Nikkō to conclude that Nichiren's enlightened entity no longer resided at Mount Minobu. Furthermore, he entered a state of mental depression and deeply felt that Kuon-ji Temple was no longer the place for perpetuating Nichiren's teachings, causing him to pack up his personal belongings, the Dai Gohonzon mandala and some venerated relics belonging to Nichiren to depart, never to return. Nikkō left Mount Minobu with a group of select disciples in the spring of 1289. Nanjo Shichijo-jiro Tokimitsu, a lay believer residing near Mount Fuji took great pity on Nikko Shonin and his disciples and offered them sanctuary to stay, later donating a tract of land for a new temple that became Taiseki-ji Temple. Taiseki-ji is today the head temple of the Nichiren Shōshū school and, since its founding on 12 October 1290, has been a major center of the Kōmon-ha (興門派, also called the 富士派: Fuji-ha) branch of Nichiren Buddhism, as the schools stemming from Nikkō were traditionally known.

Upon nearing death on 10 November 1332, Nikkō named his disciple Nichimoku (1260–1333) as his successor and passed onto him the Ozagawari Gohonzon, inscribed in 8 April 1308 for the memorial honor of the martyr “Jinshiro”, approximately 14 years after the persecution of Hei No Saimon Yoritsuna. This mandala is now enshrined inside the Dai-Kyakuden, along with his Juzu beads made of Crystal and Shimamenu Onyx which are now preserved in the Gohozo building of Taisekiji.

For the remaining 36 years of his life, Nikkō then retired a few miles away to Omosu, Suruga Province where he founded a seminary and temple, Kitayama Honmon-ji belonging to Hokke-shū (法華宗) school, and concentrated on training disciples until his death in the second lunar month of 1333 at the age of 87. A grave claiming to house the ash remains of Nikkō Shōnin is located in Kitayama Honmonji Temple in Suruga Province. After his death within this same temple, a statue image of the solar goddess Amaterasu Omi-Kami and the protector god Hachiman was enshrined, donated by some early Hokkekō believers. Such sculptural images are considered only decorative in present teachings of the Nichiren Shōshū school.

== Buddhist articles claimed to have been brought to Taisekiji Temple ==
According to the doctrinal beliefs of Nichiren Shōshū, Nikkō Shonin left Mount Minobu with several articles pertaining to Nichiren, namely the following:

- The Dai Gohonzon Mandala
- Transfer inheritance documents of his legitimacy as chief priest of Kuon-ji and as successor
- Several Gohonzon mandalas inscribed by Nichiren
- Remaining partial bones (17 pieces) and cremated ashes of Nichiren
- The Go-Nikuge, surviving tooth dentures belonging to Nichiren
- A dragon candlestick, koro incense burner and vase Nichiren used when summoning rain during times of drought for the peasant devotees.
- The statue of Nichiren Daishōnin currently enshrined within the Hoando Warehouse.
- The compilations of Ongi Kuden, (now lost to history).

== Claim to the successorship of Nichiren ==
Some followers of the Nichiren schools stemming from Nikkō, in particular the Nichiren Shōshū school, as well as the Soka Gakkai, view Nikkō as the legitimate successor to Nichiren. They base this claim on a document dated the ninth lunar month of 1282 called the Nichiren ichigo guhō fuzoku-sho (“Document Entrusting the Law that Nichiren Propagated throughout His Life”). In this document, Nichiren entrusts the "entirety of his lifetime of teaching" to Nikkō and names him the "Great Master of propagation of the essential teaching". These documents contained in a treasure box are alleged to have been stolen by clan head Takeda Katsuyori on behalf of the Nishiyama Temple, a faction of Nichiren Shū during the 15th century via force.

Nikkō also designated six new disciples (Nichidai, Nitchō, Nichidō, Nichimyō, Nichigō, and Nichijo), whom he charged with the task of propagation after his death.

Other Nichiren lineages based on the other original five senior disciples vehemently reject this claim of successorship, as they claim the surviving document does not exist in Nichiren's hand or any of his immediate disciples, rather copied down by Nikko's extant disciples. Instead, such schools claim that Nikko was only a resident priest in Kuonji Temple before 1285, and later became the Chief Priest of that temple from 1285–1289, just before he moved to the Fujinomiya area.

Some of Nikkō's direct disciples also eventually spawned schools that deviated to some degree or another from his own doctrines, often due to political pressure or internal power plays going back and forth to separating or rejoining the Nikko-related temples of the Fujinomiya area before and after the Second World War.

== Original Japanese terms ==
1. 身延山付嘱書, also called the Ikegami sōjō (池上相承) "Succession document [written at] Ikegami"
2. 日蓮一期弘法付嘱書: Nichiren ichigo guhō fuzoku-sho
3. 日蓮一期の弘法: Nichiren ichigo no guhō
4. 本門弘通の大導師: Honmon Guzū no Daidōshi

== Sources ==
- Nikkō Shōnin Nichimoku Shōnin Shōden (日興上人･日目上人正伝: "Orthodox biography of Nikkō Shōnin and Nichimoku Shōnin"), Taisekiji, 1982
- Nichiren Daishōnin Shōden (日蓮大聖人正伝: "Orthodox biography of Nichiren Daishōnin"), Taisekiji, 1981
- The Life of Nichiren Daishonin. Kirimura, Yasuji. Nichiren Shoshu International Center, 1980
