= Ongi kuden =

Text in Nichiren Buddhism

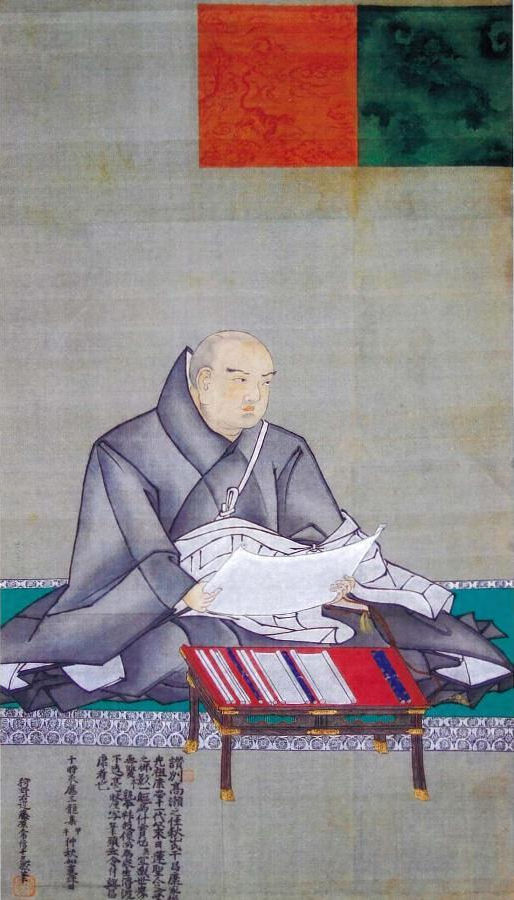
Portrait of Nichiren Daishonin by Japanese artisan Kano Tsunenobu (1636—1713), now preserved at Nichiren Shoshu Honmonji Temple in Mitoyo, Kagawa prefecture. Measuring approximately 40” inches by 22” inches on silk, Edo period.

The Ongi Kuden (御義口伝) (also known as Shū-Jū Hokke-Kyō Ongi Kuden (就註法華経口伝) or The Record of the Orally Transmitted Teachings) is a hermeneutic text in Nichiren Shoshu Buddhism. The Kuden are the alleged oral teachings of Nichiren Daishonin on the Lotus Sutra, beginning on 1 January 1278 which were recorded and compiled by his senior disciple Nikkō Shōnin thirteen years after the death of his master.

The Hokkeko adherents of the Dai Gohonzon mandala regard this text as one of the most divinely hermeneutic treatises in Nichiren's writings, because it supposedly reveals some essential principles of Nichiren's teachings.

The Nichiren Shoshu religion considers this text as an authoritative Buddhist scripture preserved at the repository of Nikko Shonin from the year 1295, recopied in the year 1539 (both lost to history). Due to claims of the text being divinely inspired, it vehemently rejects any re-interpretation of this text outside the confines of the sect.

== Structure ==
Ongi kuden is a series of lectures on important sentences and phrases of the Lotus Sutra, and includes the following lectures:

- The true meaning of Namu Myōhō Renge Kyō.
- Each of the twenty-eight chapters of the Lotus Sutra (Two hundred and thirty one inventory items).
- The Innumerable Meanings Sutra and the Samantabhadra Meditation Sutra.
- The essential passage in each of the 28 chapters of the Lotus Sutra.

== Concepts drawn ==
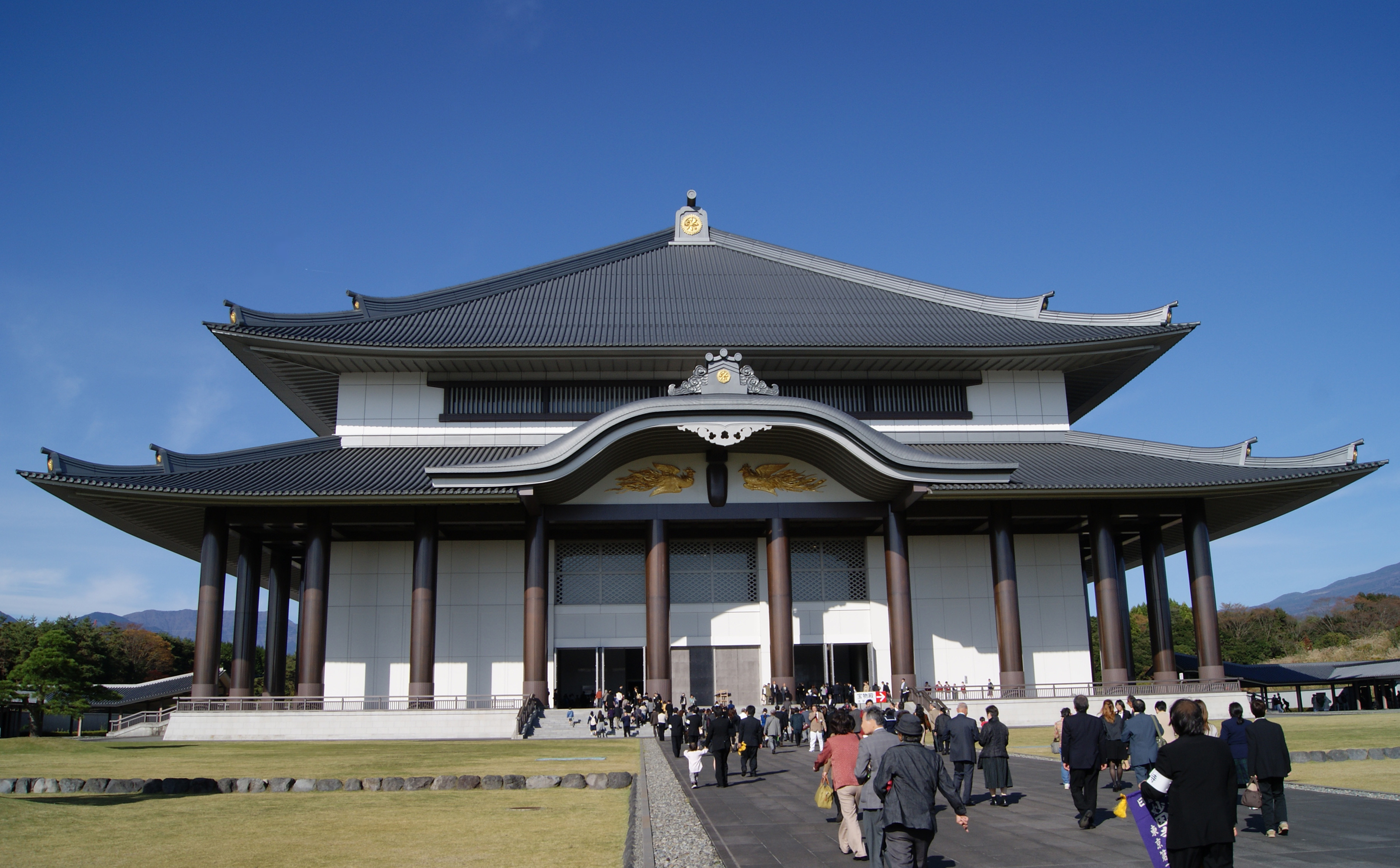
The Hoando storagehouse building in Taisekiji, where the Dai Gohonzon is currently enshrined.

Ongi kuden elucidates the following theories and concepts as interpreted by Nichiren Shoshu:

- The "Buddhism of Sowing" (Nichiren Buddha) is far superior to the "Buddhism of the Harvest" (Shakyamuni Buddha) in the Third Age of Buddhism.
- The identity of the Three Great Secret Laws to secure the state of Buddhahood.
- Gohonzon in terms of the Person (Nin Honzon) and the unity of a human person and the Gohonzon. (Nin-po-Ikka)
- Kuon-ganjo (This refers to the secret identity of the Buddha of mysteriously infinite, timeless past, presently claimed to be Nichiren Daishonin.)
- Singularity of both the physical body and "Buddha mind".
- Three bodies that animate a Buddha and Three truths of the World (Santai)
- The mutual interpossession of the ten realms of Buddhism and Ichinen Sanzen moments in a singular Life.
- World peace and security of the land.
- Lasting personal happiness in each and every cycle of Rebirth.

== The meaning of Nam(u) Myōhō Renge Kyō ==
Chanting Nam-myoho-renge-kyo, the core practice of Nichiren's teachings, is weighted on heavily with great significance on Ongi-Kuden. Nam-myoho-renge-kyo is explained in Ongi kuden as follows:

Romanization	Chinese	Sanskrit	English	Hermeneutic interpretation of Nichiren Shoshu
Nam	南 無	Namo	Devotion	Dedication of one's life to the truth of Myoho-renge-kyo and to Nichiren Daishonin as the Buddha who embodies the truth, the Dai Gohonzon of the Three Great Secret Laws in terms of both Buddhist theory and religious practice.
Myōhō	妙 法	Saddharma	The mystic law	Ignorance and enlightenment are a single entity, both hell and heavenly states are also singular essence.
Renge	蓮 華	Puṇḍarīka	The Nelumbo nucifera flower	Singularity of both cause and effect (archetype symbolized by this flower)
Kyō	経	Sūtra	Sutra or teachings	All phenomena through three existences of past, present, and future as embodied by the Buddha of Compassion, Nichiren Daishonin.

== Claims of forgery ==
A large number of Nichiren's writings collected and published by Soka Gakkai (called Gosho Zenshu) has been called into question.

Some scholars have raised doubts about whether these texts were actually authored by Nichiren or approved by him or his associates. Additionally, there has been debate over the authorship of Ongi Kuden, which is believed by some to have been compiled by Nikko Shonin rather than Nichiren Daishonin himself.

The Heibonsha World Encyclopedia states that a growing number of Nichirenist religious and textual writings, including Ongi Kuden, are regarded by some scholars as potentially forgeries.

== See also ==
- Glossary of Japanese Buddhism

== Cited works ==
- "Ongi Kuden" 御義口伝. World Encyclopedia (in Japanese). Heibonsha. 1998.
