= Japanese pagoda =

Significant component of Japanese Buddhist temple compounds

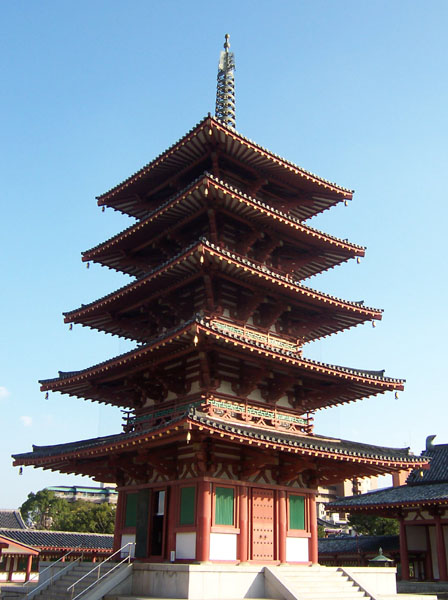

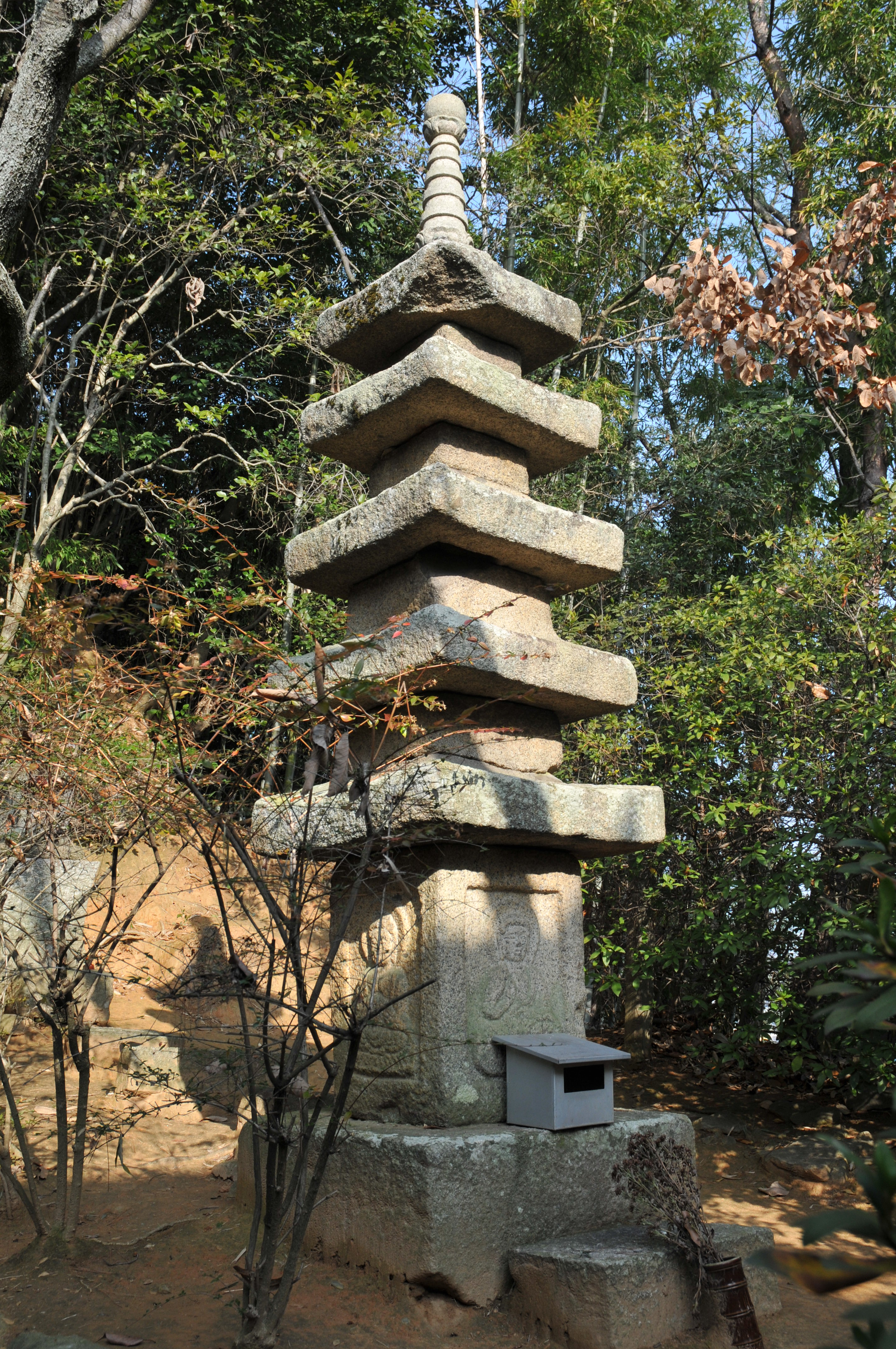

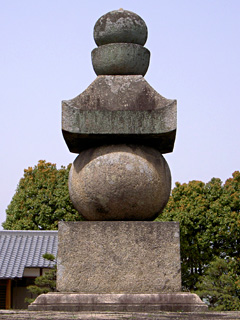

Multi-storied pagodas in wood and stone, and a gorintō

Pagodas in Japan are called tō (塔) lit. 'pagoda', sometimes buttō (仏塔; lit. Buddhist pagoda) or tōba (塔婆; lit. pagoda), and derive historically from the Chinese pagoda, itself an interpretation of the Indian stupa. Like the stupa, pagodas were originally used as reliquaries, but in many cases ended up losing this function. Pagodas are quintessentially Buddhist and an important component of Japanese Buddhist temple compounds but, because until the Kami and Buddhas Separation Act of 1868, a Shinto shrine was normally also a Buddhist temple and vice versa, they are not rare at shrines either. The famous Itsukushima Shrine, for example, has one. After the Meiji Restoration the word tō, once used exclusively in a religious context, came to mean also "tower" in the western sense, as for example in Eiffel Tower (エッフェル塔, Efferu-tō).

Of the Japanese pagoda's many forms, some are built in wood and are collectively known as mokutō (木塔; lit. wood pagoda), but most are carved out of stone (sekitō (石塔; lit. stone pagoda). Wood pagodas are large buildings with either two stories (like the Tahō pagoda (多宝塔, tahōtō), see photo below) or an odd number of stories. Extant wood pagodas with more than two stories have almost always either three stories (and are therefore called sanjū-no-tō (三重塔; lit. three-storeyed pagoda)) or five (and are called gojū-no-tō (五重塔; lit. five-storeyed pagoda). Stone pagodas are nearly always small, usually well below 3 metres (9.8 ft), and as a rule offer no usable space. If they have more than one storey, pagodas are called tasōtō (多層塔; lit. multi-storied pagoda) or tajūtō (多重塔; lit. multi-storied pagoda).

A pagoda's size is measured in ken, where a ken is the interval between two pillars of a traditional-style building. A tahōtō for example can be either 5x5 ken or 3x3 ken. The word is usually translated in English as "bay" and is better understood as an indication of proportions than as a unit of measurement.

== History ==
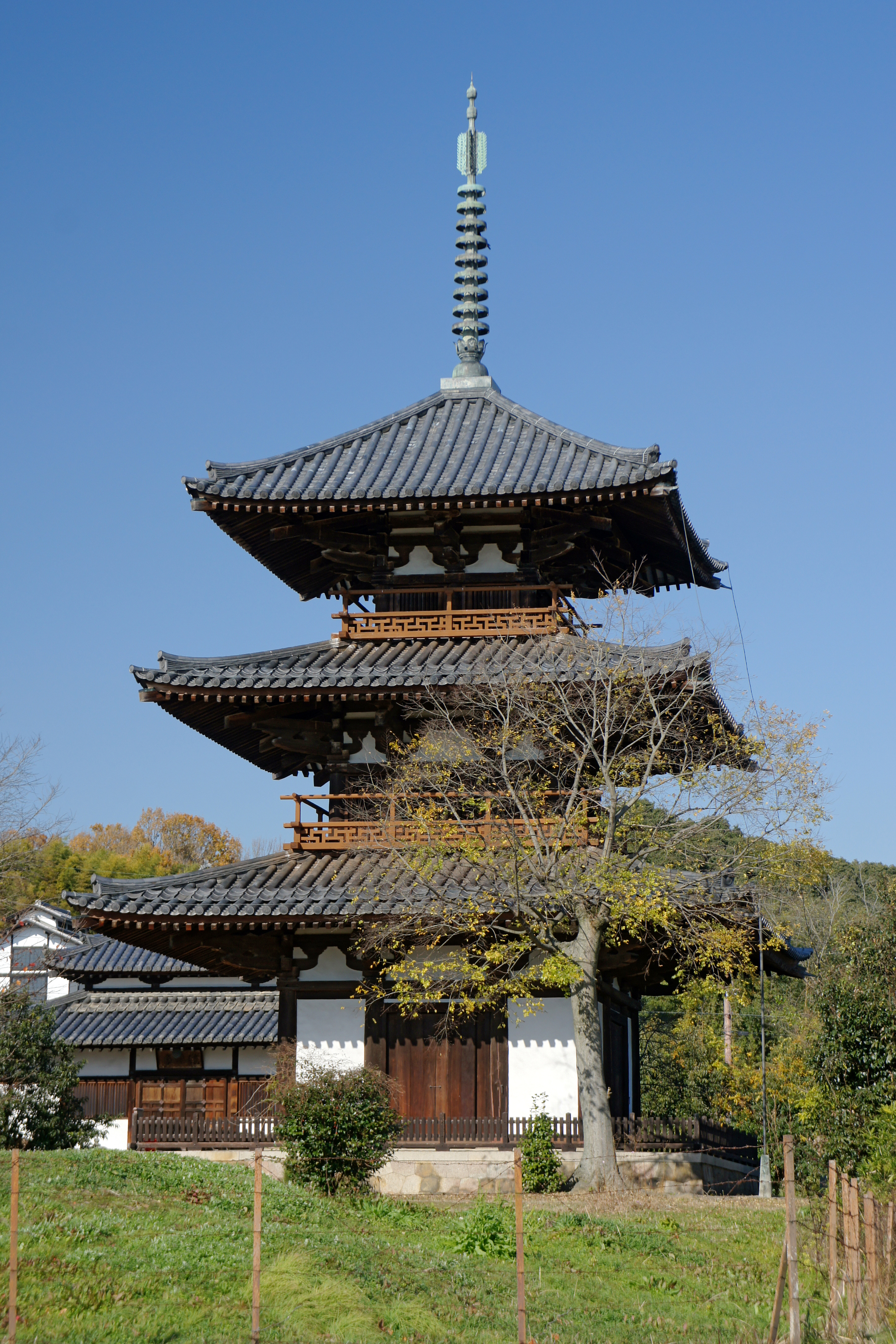
Japan's oldest three-storeyed pagoda at Hokki-ji, Ikaruga, Nara Pref. It was built in 706.

The stupa was originally a simple mound containing the Buddha's ashes which in time became more elaborate, while its finial grew proportionally larger. After reaching China, the stupa met the Chinese watchtower and evolved into the pagoda, a tower with an odd number of stories. (Note: Odd numbers are strongly favoured by Chinese numerology and Buddhism. They are supposed to represent yang, that is, the male and positive principle, and are therefore considered lucky.) Its use then spread to Korea and, from there, to Japan. Following its arrival in Japan together with Buddhism in the 6th century, the pagoda became one of the focal points of the early Japanese garan. (Note: Temple compound, ideally composed of seven buildings.) In Japan it evolved in shape, size and function, finally losing its original role as a reliquary. It also became extremely common, while on the Asian continent it is rare.

With the birth of new sects in later centuries, the pagoda lost importance and was consequently relegated to the margins of the garan. Temples of the Jōdo sects rarely have a pagoda. During the Kamakura period the Zen sect arrived in Japan and their temples do not normally include a pagoda.

Pagodas originally were reliquaries and did not contain sacred images, but in Japan many, for example Hōryū-ji's five-storied pagoda, enshrine statues of various deities. To allow the opening of a room at the ground floor and therefore create some usable space, the pagoda's central shaft, which originally reached the ground, was shortened to the upper stories, where it rested on supporting beams. In that room are enshrined statues of the temple's main objects of worship. Inside Shingon pagodas there can be paintings of deities called Shingon Hasso (真言八祖); on the ceiling and on the central shaft there can be decorations and paintings.

=== Design and structure evolution ===
The edge of a pagoda's eaves forms a straight line, with each following edge being shorter than the other. The more difference in length (a parameter called teigen (逓減, gradual diminution) in Japanese) between stories, the more solid and secure the pagoda seems to be. Both teigen and the finial are greater in older pagodas, giving them a sense of solidity. Vice versa, recent pagodas tend to be steeper and have shorter finials, creating svelter silhouettes.

From the structural point of view, old pagodas had a stone base (心礎, shinso) over which stood the main pillar (心柱, shinbashira). Around it would be erected the first storey's supporting pillars, then the beams supporting the eaves and so on. The other stories would be built over the completed one, and on top of the main pillar would at last be inserted the finial. In later eras, all of the supporting structures would be erected at once, and later to them were fixed parts of more cosmetic function.

Early pagodas had a central pillar that penetrated deep into the ground. With the evolution of architectural techniques, it was first put to rest on a base stone at ground level, then it was shortened and put to rest on beams at the second storey to allow the opening of a room.

Their role within the temple declined gradually while they were being functionally replaced by main halls (kondō). Originally the centerpiece of the Shingon and Tendai garan, they were moved later to its edges and finally abandoned, in particular by the Zen sects, the last to appear in Japan.

=== Loss of importance of the pagoda within the garan ===
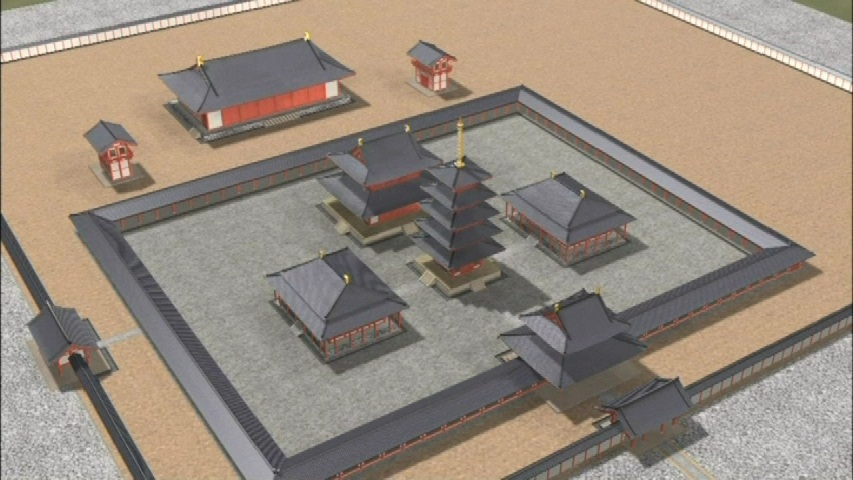
A reconstruction of Asuka-dera's original layout with a pagoda at its center

Because of the relics they contained, wooden pagodas used to be the centerpiece of the garan, the seven edifices considered indispensable for a temple. They gradually lost importance and were replaced by the kondō (golden hall), because of the magic powers believed to lie within the images the building housed. This loss of status was so complete that Zen schools, which arrived late in Japan from China, normally do not have any pagoda in their garan. The layout of four early temples clearly illustrates this trend: they are in chronological order Asuka-dera, Shitennō-ji, Hōryū-ji, and Yakushi-ji. In the first, the pagoda was at the very center of the garan surrounded by three small kondō (see the reconstruction of the temple's original layout). In the second, a single kondō is at the center of the temple and the pagoda lies in front of it. At Hōryū-ji, they are one next to the other. Yakushi-ji has a single, large kondō at the center with two pagodas on the sides. The same evolution can be observed in Buddhist temples in China.

== Stone pagodas ==
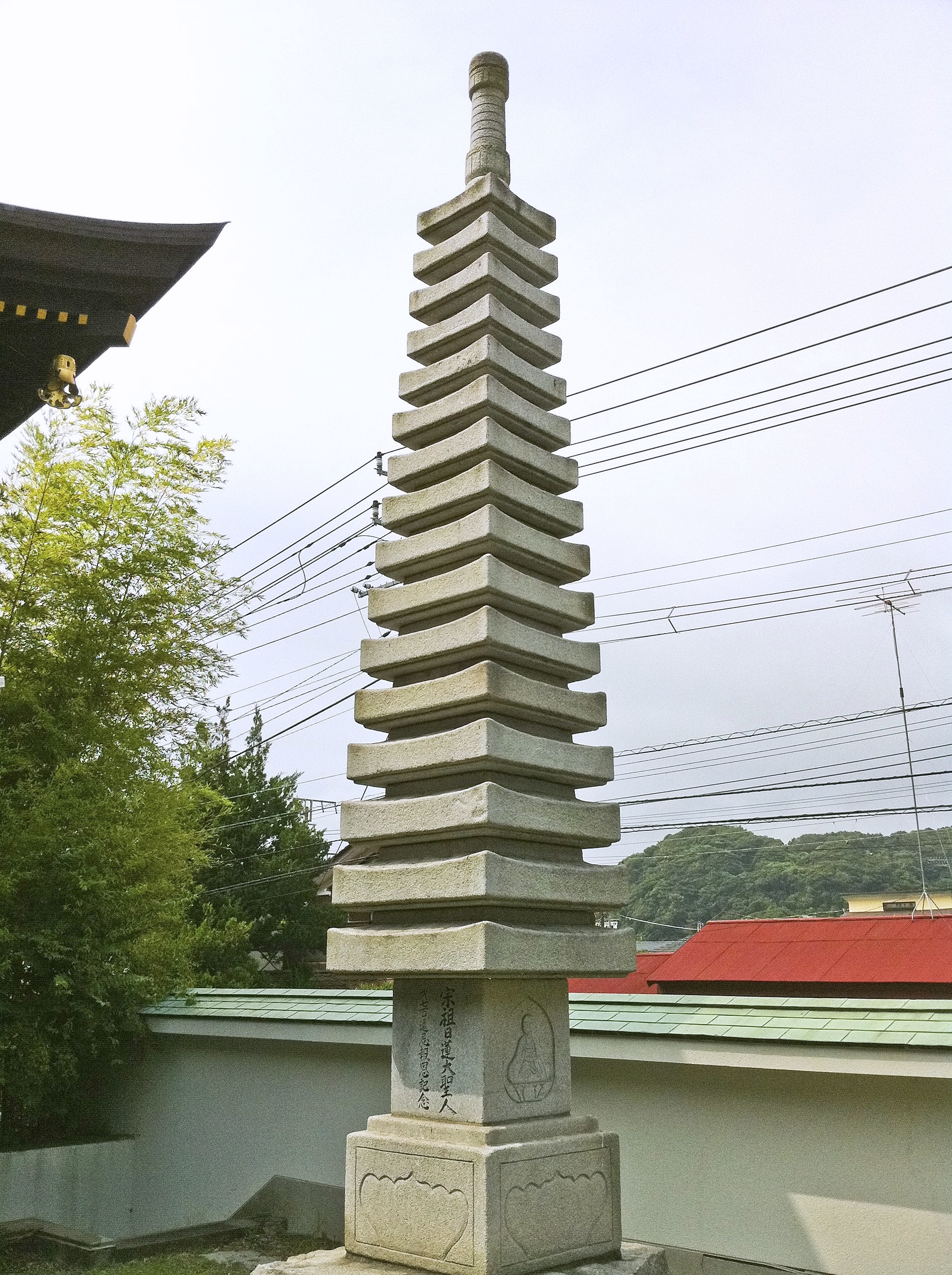
A rare 16-storey stone pagoda at Chōshō-ji in Kamakura

Stone pagodas (sekitō) are usually made of materials like apatite or granite, are much smaller than wooden ones and are finely carved. Often they bear sanskrit inscriptions, Buddhist figurines and Japanese lunar calendar dates nengō. Like wooden ones, they are mostly classifiable on the basis of the number of stories as tasōtō or hōtō, but there are however some styles hardly ever seen in wood, namely the gorintō, the muhōtō, the hōkyōintō and the kasatōba.

=== Tasōtō or tajūtō ===
With a few very rare exceptions, tasōtō (also called tajūtō, 多層塔) have an odd number of stories, normally comprised between three and thirteen. They are usually less than three meters tall, but they can occasionally be much taller. The tallest still extant is a 13-storey pagoda at Hannya-ji in Nara, which is 14.12 m. They are often dedicated to Buddha and offer no usable room, but some have a small space inside which holds a sacred image. In the oldest extant specimen, while the edge of each storey are parallel to the ground, each successive storey is smaller than the next, resulting in a strongly slanted curve. More modern tasōtō tend to have a less pronounced curve.

- Media related to Tasōtō at Wikimedia Commons

=== Hōtō ===
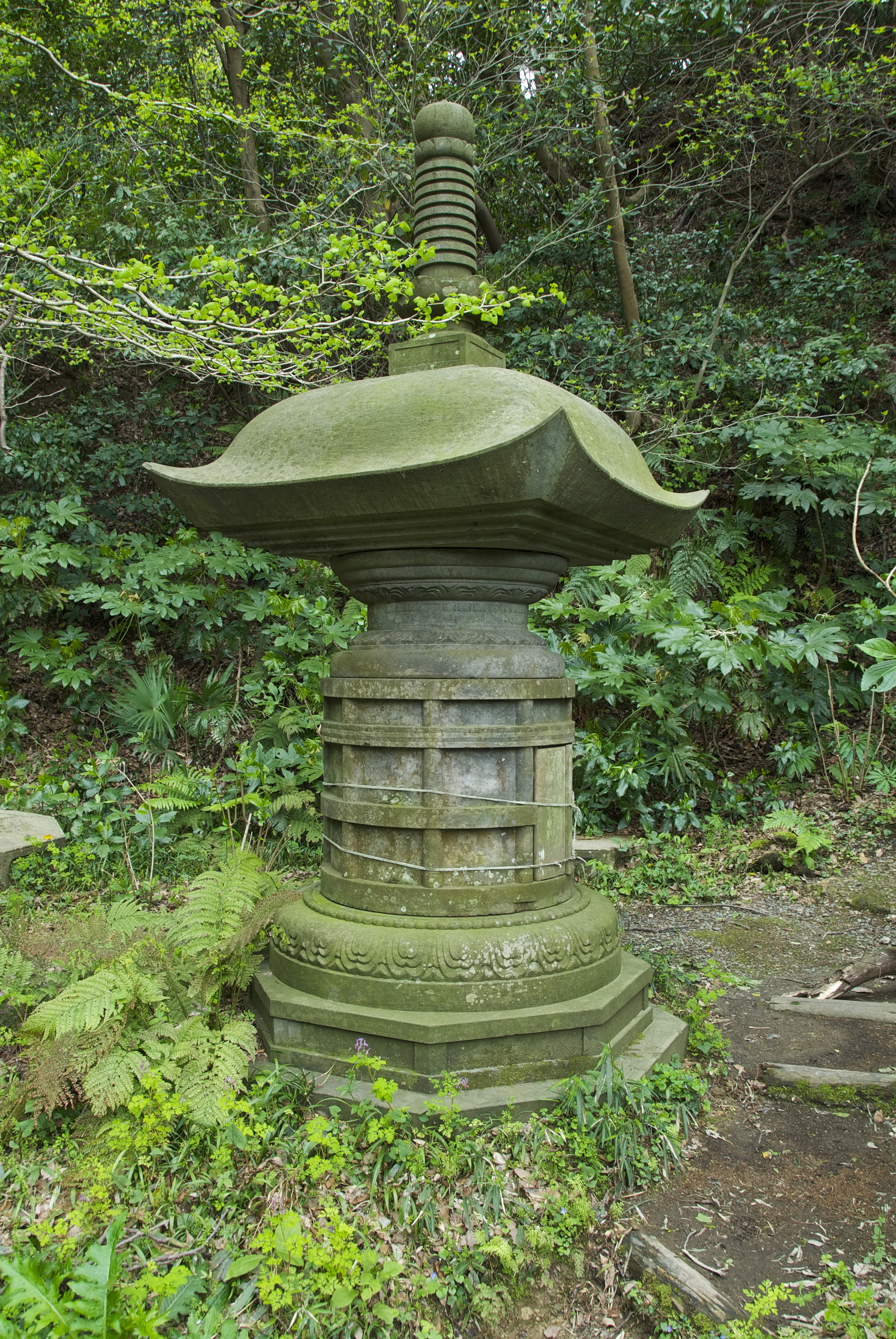
A hōtō at Ankokuron-ji

A hōtō (宝塔, lit. jewel stupa) is a pagoda consisting of four parts: a low foundation stone, a cylindrical body with a rounded top, a four-sided roof and a finial. Unlike the similar tahōtō (see section below) it has no enclosed pent roof (mokoshi) around its circular core. Like the tahōtō it takes its name from Buddhist deity Tahō Nyorai. The hōtō was born during the early Heian period, when the Tendai and Shingon sects first arrived in Japan. Indeed, because it does not exist on the Asian continent, it is believed to have been invented in Japan.

There used to exist full-size hōtō, but almost only miniature ones survive, normally made of stone and/or metal.

- Media related to Hōtō at Wikimedia Commons

=== Gorintō ===
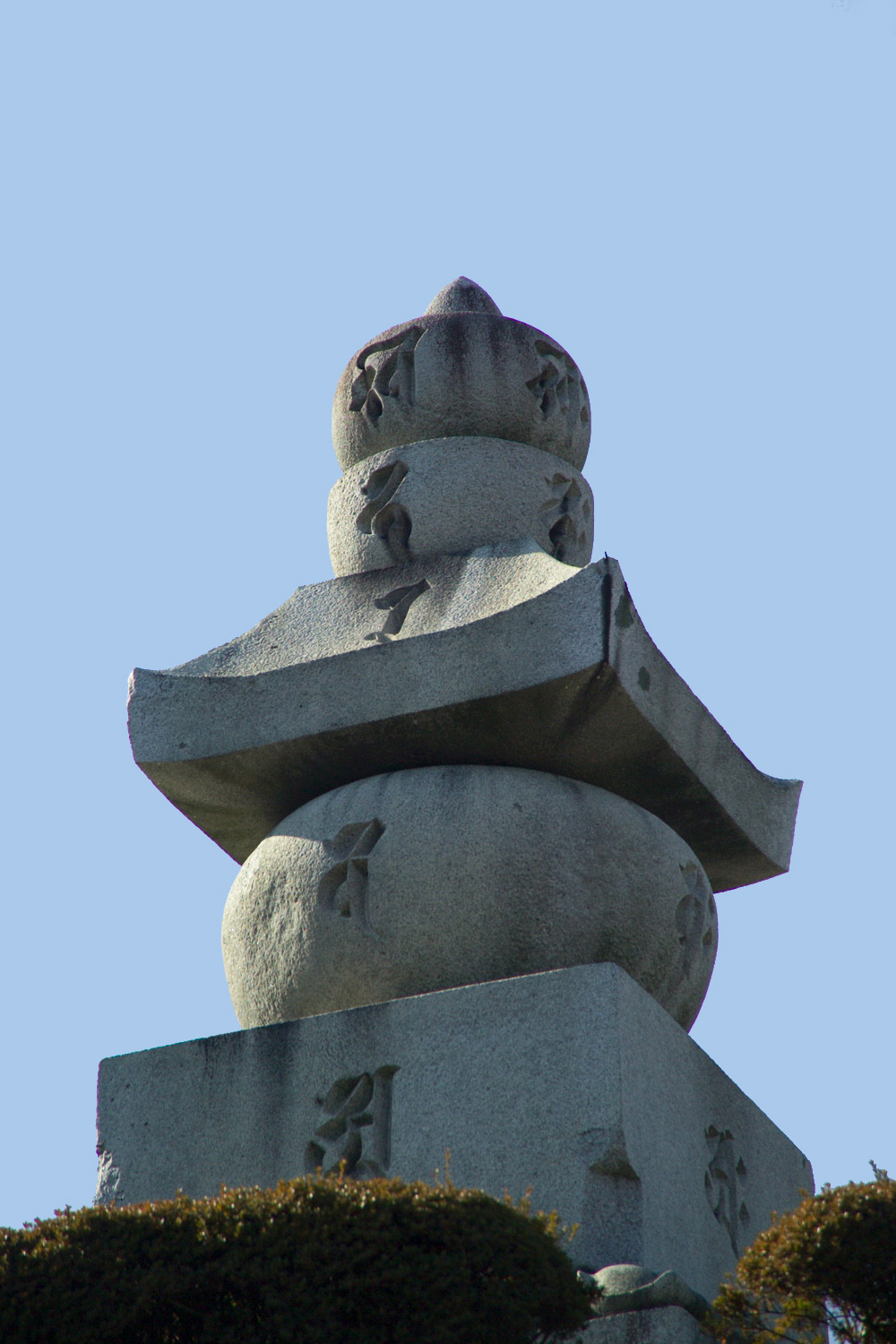
A gorintō

The gorintō (五輪塔; lit. five ring tower) is a pagoda found almost only in Japan and believed to have been first adopted by the Shingon and Tendai sects during the mid Heian period. It is used as a tomb marker or as a cenotaph, and is therefore a common sight in Buddhist temples and cemeteries. It is also called gorinsotōba (五輪卒塔婆; lit. 'five-ringed stupa') or goringedatsu (五輪解脱), where the term sotoba is a transliteration of the Sanskrit word stupa.

In all its variations, the gorintō is made of five blocks (although that number can sometimes be difficult to detect), each having one of the five shapes which symbolize of the Five Elements believed to be the basic building blocks of reality: earth (cube), water (sphere), fire (pyramid), air (crescent), and ether, energy, or void (lotus). The last two rings (air and ether) are visually and conceptually united into a single subgroup.

- Media related to gorintō at Wikimedia Commons

=== Hōkyōintō ===
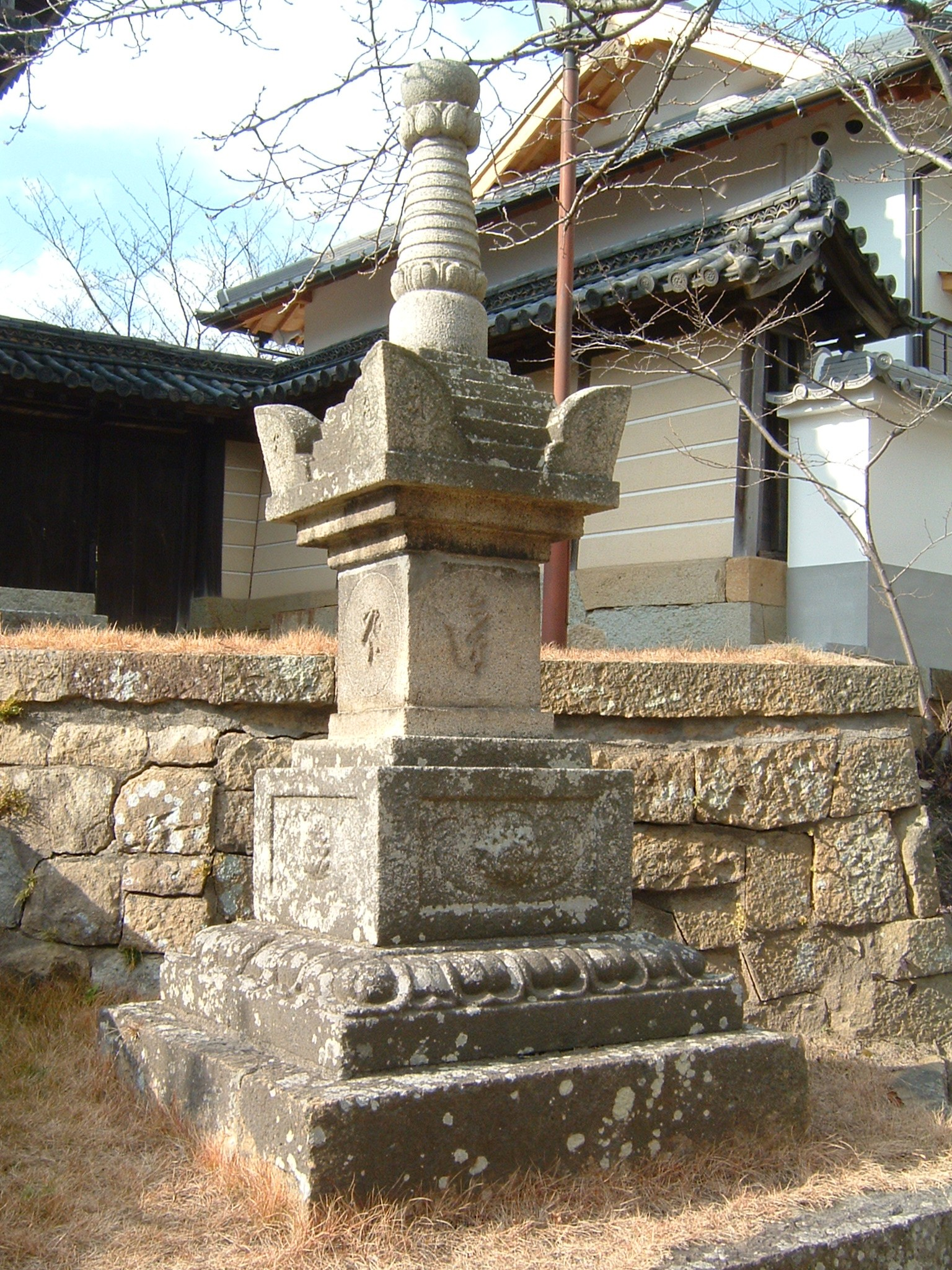
A hōkyōintō

The hōkyōintō (宝篋印塔) is a large stone pagoda so called because it originally contained the Hōkyōin (宝篋印) dharani (陀羅尼) sūtra. It was originally used as a cenotaph for the King of Wuyue - Qian Liu in China.

The hōkyōintō tradition in Japan is believed to have begun during the Asuka period (550–710 CE). They used to be made of wood and started to be made in stone only during the Kamakura period. It is also during this period that they started to be used as tombstones and cenotaphs. The hōkyōintō started to be made in its present form during the Kamakura period. Like a gorintō, it is divided in five main sections representing the five elements of Japanese cosmology. The sūtra it sometimes hides contain all the pious deeds of a Tathagata Buddha, and the faithful believe that, by praying in front of the hōkyōintō, their sins will be canceled, during their lives they will be protected from disasters and after death they will go to heaven.

- Media related to Hōkyōintō at Wikimedia Commons

=== Muhōtō or rantō ===
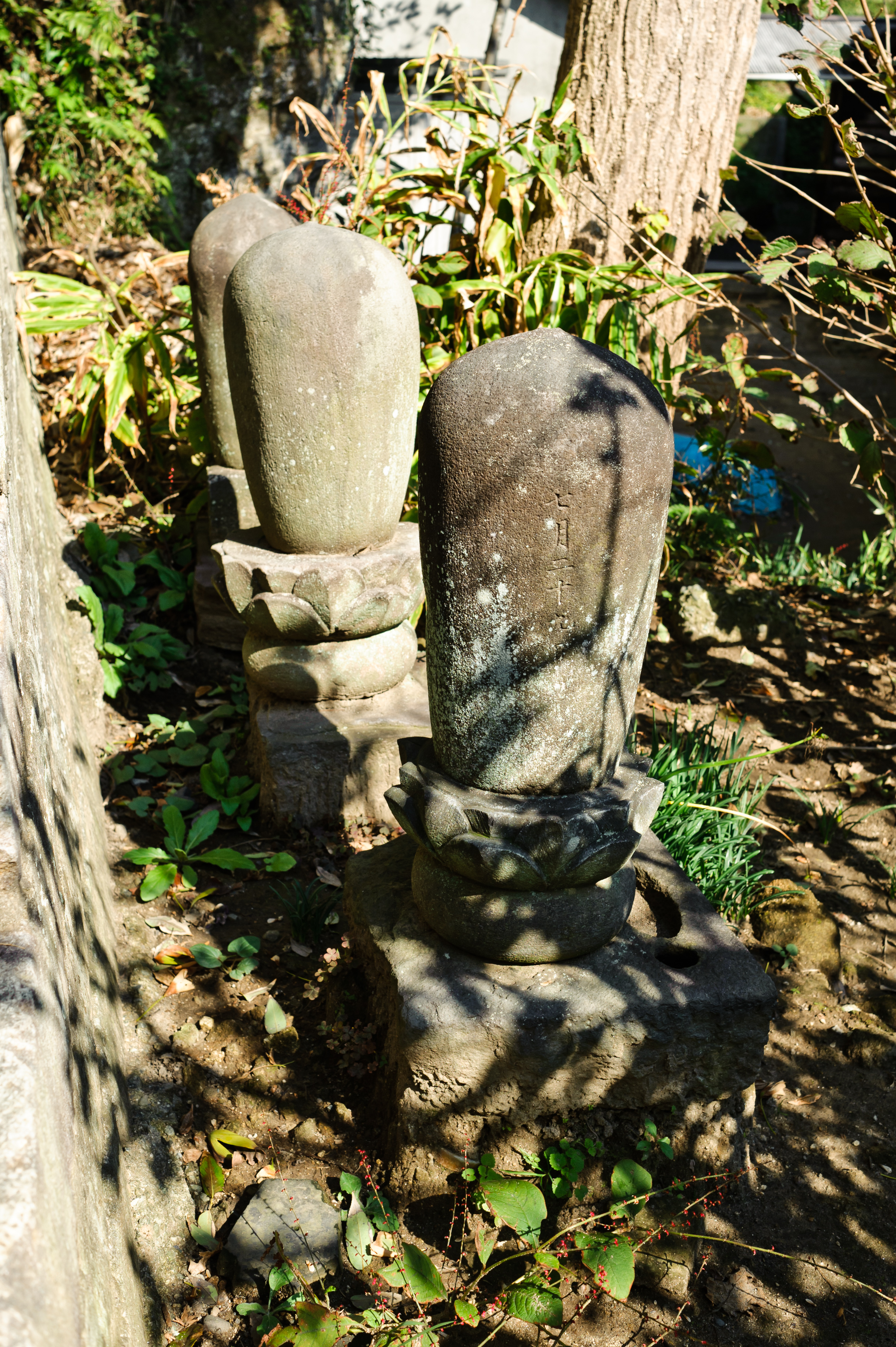
A muhōtō

The muhōtō (無縫塔; lit. no stitch tower) or rantō (卵塔; lit. egg tower) is a pagoda which usually marks the gravesite of a Buddhist priest. It was originally used by just the Zen schools, but it was later adopted by the others too. Its characteristic egg-shaped upper portion is supposed to be a phallic symbol.

- Media related to Muhōtō at Wikimedia Commons

=== Kasatōba ===
A kasatōba (笠塔婆, umbrella stupa) (see photo in the gallery below) is simply a square stone post placed over a square base and covered by a pyramidal roof. Over the roof stand a bowl-shaped stone and a lotus-shaped stone. The shaft can be carved with Sanskrit words or low-relief images of Buddhist gods. Within the shaft there can be stone wheels which allow the faithful to turn the stupa around while praying as with a prayer wheel.

- Media related to Kasatōba at Wikimedia Commons

=== Sōrintō ===
The sōrintō (相輪橖) is a type of small pagoda consisting just of a pole and a sōrin.

== Wooden pagodas ==
=== Tasōtō ===
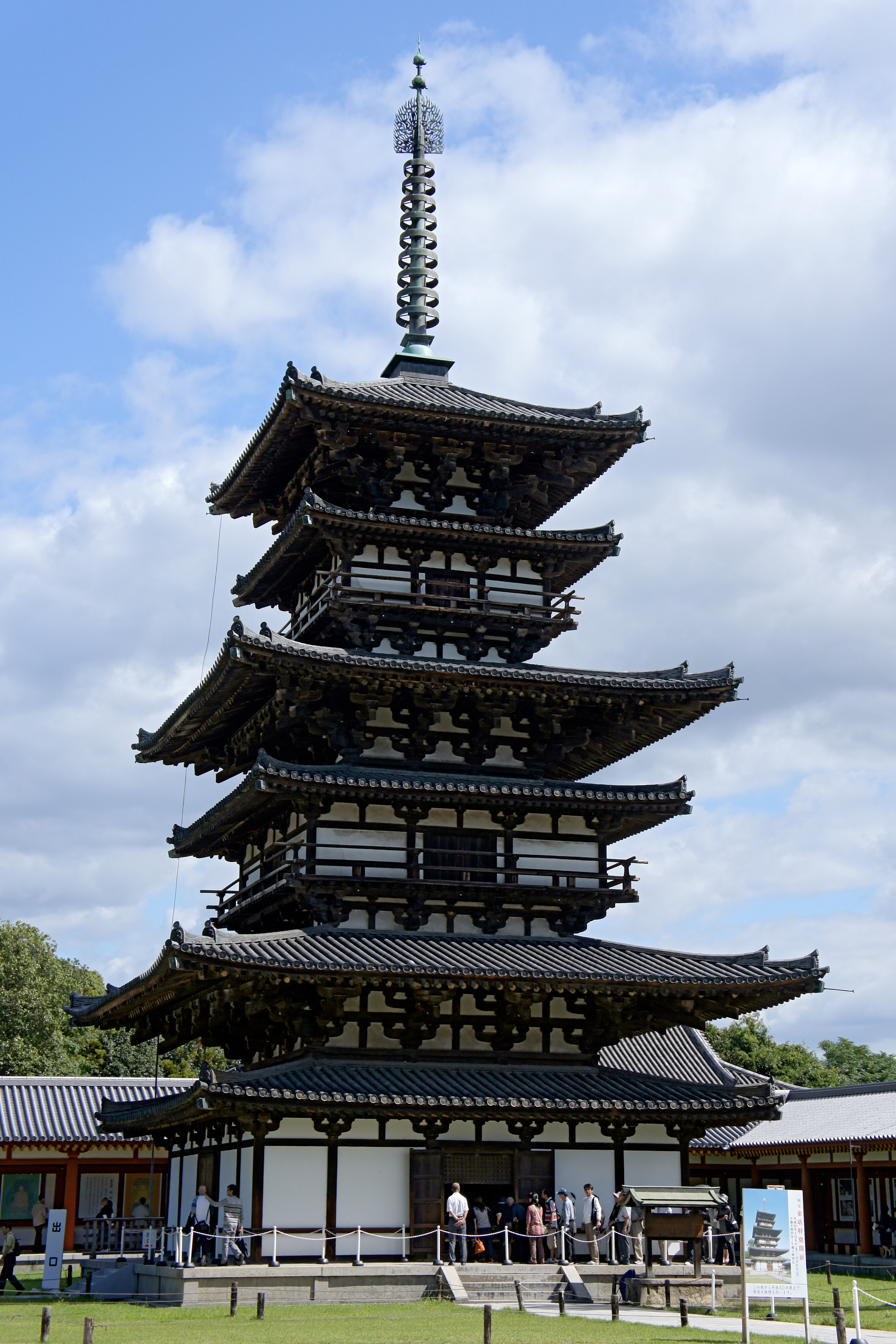
Yakushi-ji's Eastern Pagoda

Wooden tasōtō are pagodas with an odd number of stories. Some may appear to have an even number because of the presence between stories of purely decorative enclosed pent roofs called mokoshi (Note: Besides being decorative in themselves, they are also used also to hide structural components which would otherwise mar the pagoda's feel.) A famous example is Yakushi-ji's eastern pagoda (see photo to the left), which seems to have six stories but has in fact only three. Another is the tahōtō (see below), which has a single storey, plus a mokoshi under its roof, and seems therefore to have two stories. (Note: On the subject, see also the articles Hisashi, Mokoshi and Moya.) There existed specimen with seven or nine stories, but all extant ones have either three (and are therefore called sanjū-no-tō (三重塔; lit. three-storied pagoda)) or five (and are called gojū-no-tō (五重塔; lit. five-storied pagoda).（Tanzan Jinja in Sakurai, Nara, has a pagoda having thirteen, which however for structural reasons is classified separately, and is not considered a tasōtō.) The oldest three-storied pagoda stands at Nara's Hokki-ji and was built between 685 and 706. The oldest extant five-storied pagoda belongs to Hōryū-ji and was built some time during the Asuka period (538–710). The tallest wooden tasōtō belongs to Tō-ji, Kyoto. It has five stories and is 54 m (177 ft) tall.

- Media related to tasōtō at Wikimedia Commons

=== Hōtō ===
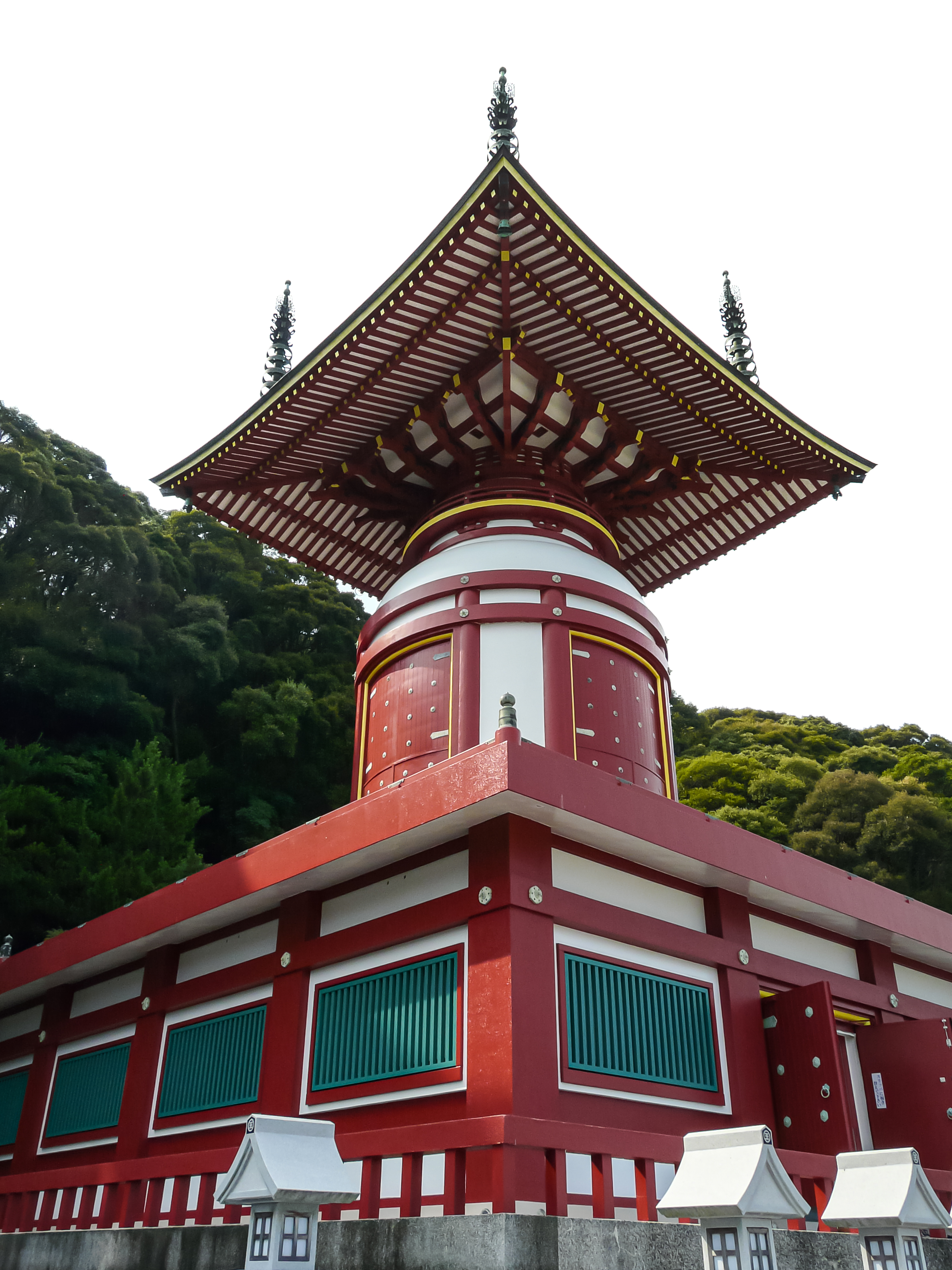
A hōtō at Yakuō-ji, Tokushima prefecture

A wooden hōtō is a rare type of pagoda consisting of four parts: a low foundation stone, a cylindrical body with a rounded top, a pyramidal roof and a finial. Unlike the similar tahōtō (see section below) it has no square enclosed pent roof (mokoshi) around its cylindrical core. Like the tahōtō it takes its name from Buddhist deity Tahō Nyorai. The hōtō was born during the early Heian period, when the Tendai and Shingon Buddhist sects first arrived in Japan.

There used to be many full-size hōtō, but almost only miniature ones survive, normally made of stone and/or metal. A good example of full-size hōtō can be seen at Ikegami Honmon-ji in Nishi-magome, Tokyo. The pagoda is 17.4 meters tall and 5.7 meters wide.

- Media related to Hōtō at Wikimedia Commons

=== Tahōtō ===
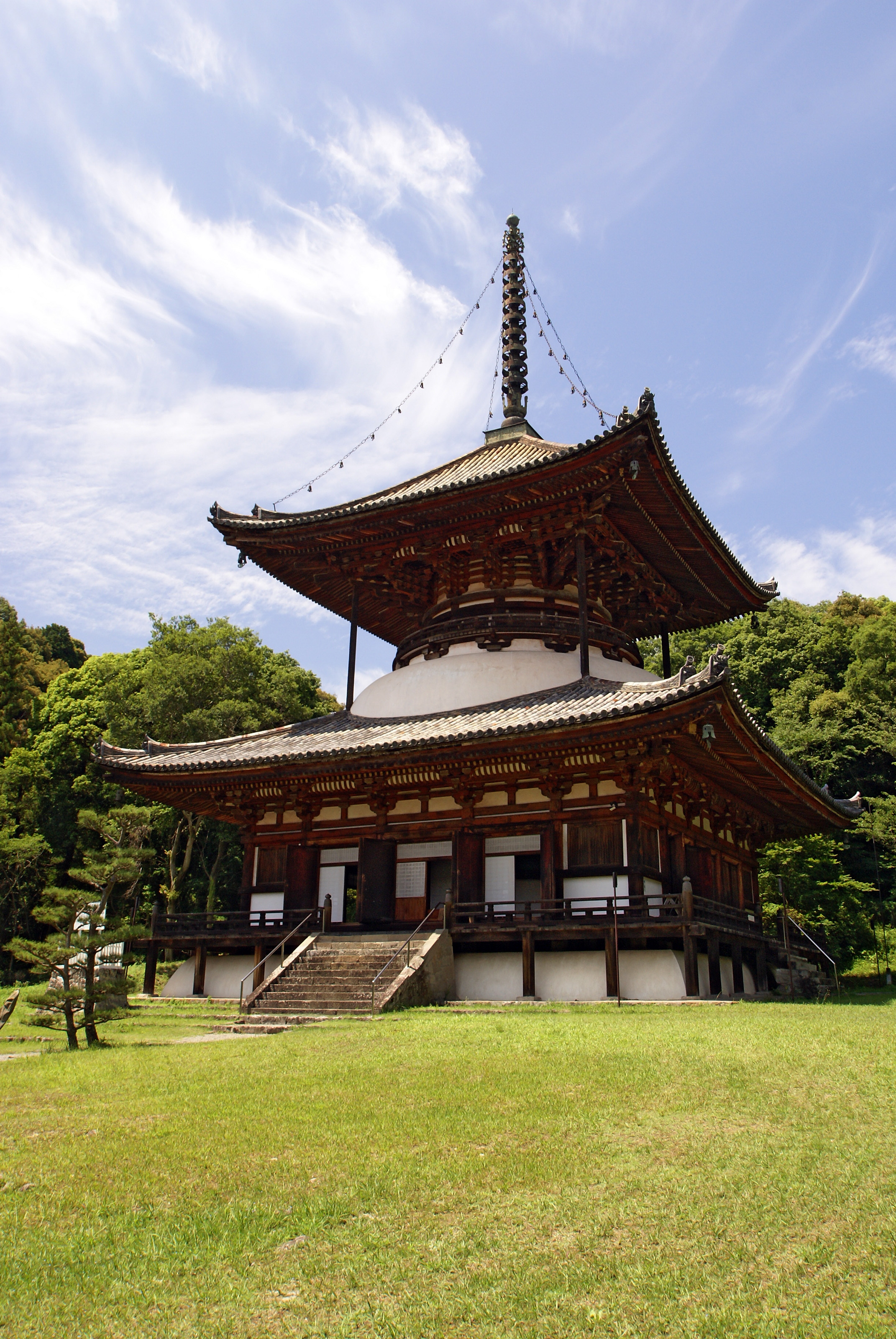
Negoro-ji's daitō

The tahōtō is a type of wooden pagoda unique for having an even number of stories (two), the first square with a rounded core, the second circular. This style of tō was created surrounding the cylindrical base of a hōtō (see above) with a square, roofed corridor called mokoshi. (Note: For reasons of space, however, the wall separating the mokoshi from the core of the pagoda is present only in large tahōtō called daitō (see the next section).) The core of the pagoda has just one storey with its ceiling below the circular second storey, which is inaccessible. Like the tasōtō and the rōmon, in spite of its appearance it therefore offers usable space only at the ground floor.

Because its kind does not exist either in Korea or in China, it is believed to have been invented in Japan during the Heian period (794–1185). The tahōtō was important enough to be considered one of the seven indispensable buildings (the so-called shichidō garan) of a Shingon temple. Kūkai himself is responsible for the construction of the tahōto at Mount Kōya's Kongōbu-ji.

==== Daitō ====
The floorplan of Negoro-ji's daitō

Usually the base of a tahōtō is 3-ken across with four main, supporting pillars called shitenbashira (四天柱) at the corners (see drawing). The room the shitenbashira form houses a sanctuary where the main objects of worship (the gohonzon) are enshrined.

Larger, 5x5 ken tahōtō however exist and are called daitō (大塔, lit. large pagoda) because of their dimensions. This is the only type of tahōtō to retain the original structure with a wall separating the corridor (mokoshi) from the core of the structure. This type of pagoda used to be common but, of all daitō ever built, only three are still extant. One is at Wakayama prefecture's Negoro-ji, another at Kongōbu-ji, again in Wakayama, and the last at Kirihata-dera, Tokushima prefecture. The daitō at Kongōbu-ji was founded by Shingon sect's Kūkai. The specimen found at Negoro-ji (see photo above) is 30.85 meters tall and a National Treasure.

- Media related to Daitō at Wikimedia Commons
- Media related to Tahōtō at Wikimedia Commons

=== Sotōba ===
Often offertory strips of wood with five subdivisions and covered with elaborate inscriptions called sotōba (卒塔婆) can be found at tombs in Japanese cemeteries (see photo in the gallery below). The inscriptions contain sūtra and the posthumous name of the dead person. Their name derives from the Sanskrit stūpa, and they can be also considered pagodas.

- Media related to Sotōba at Wikimedia Commons

== Gallery of pagodas in Japan ==
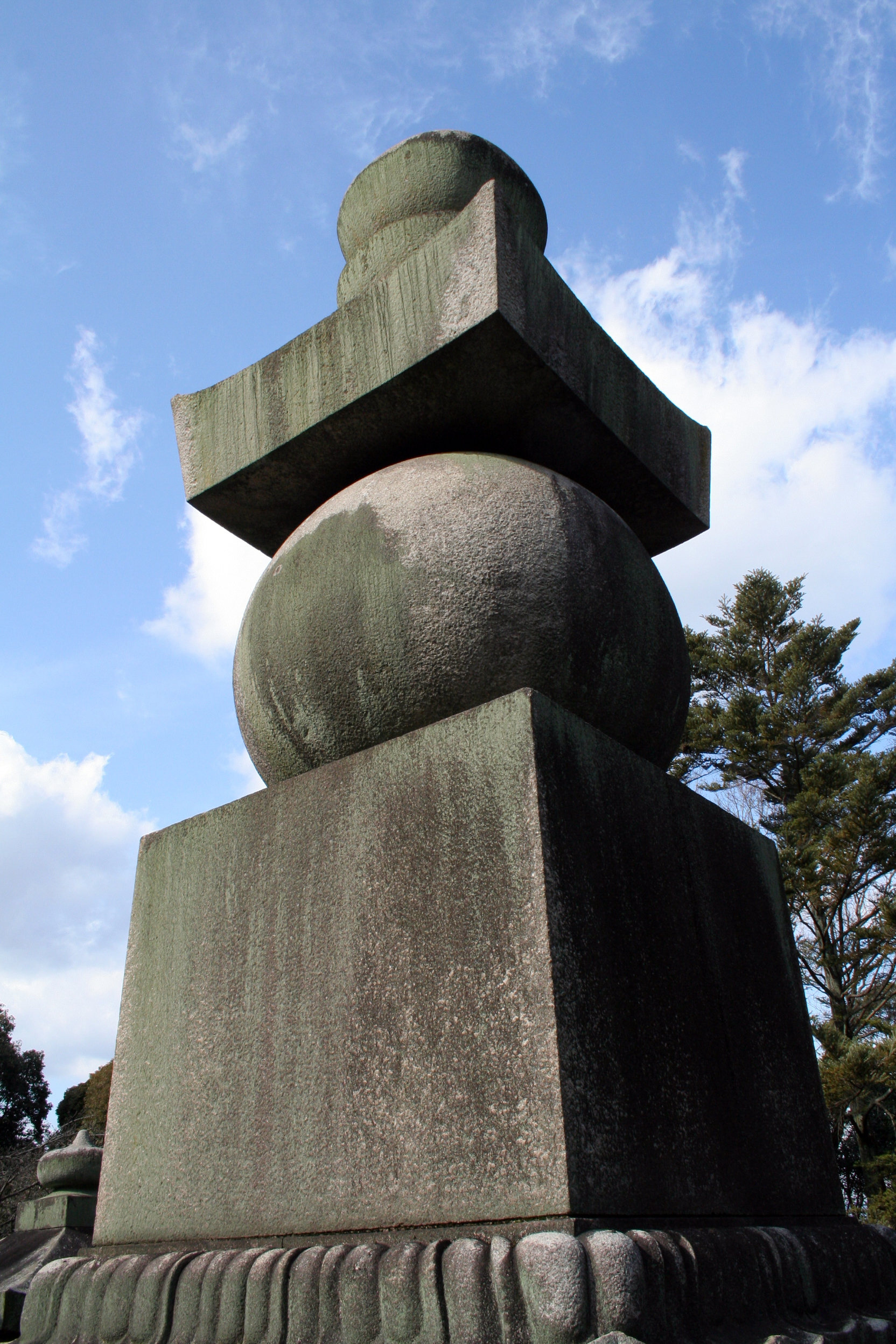
A gorintō

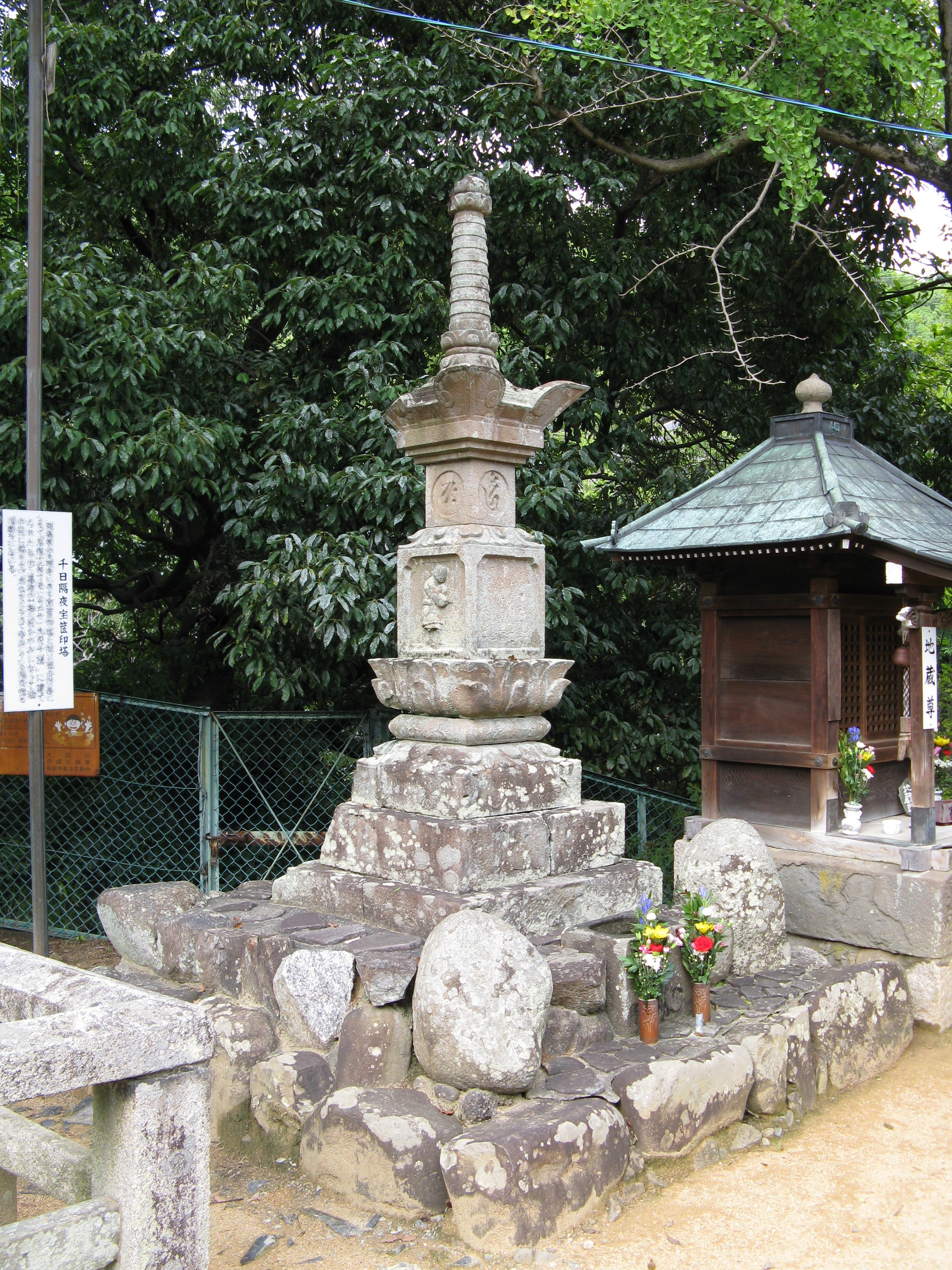
A hōkyōintō

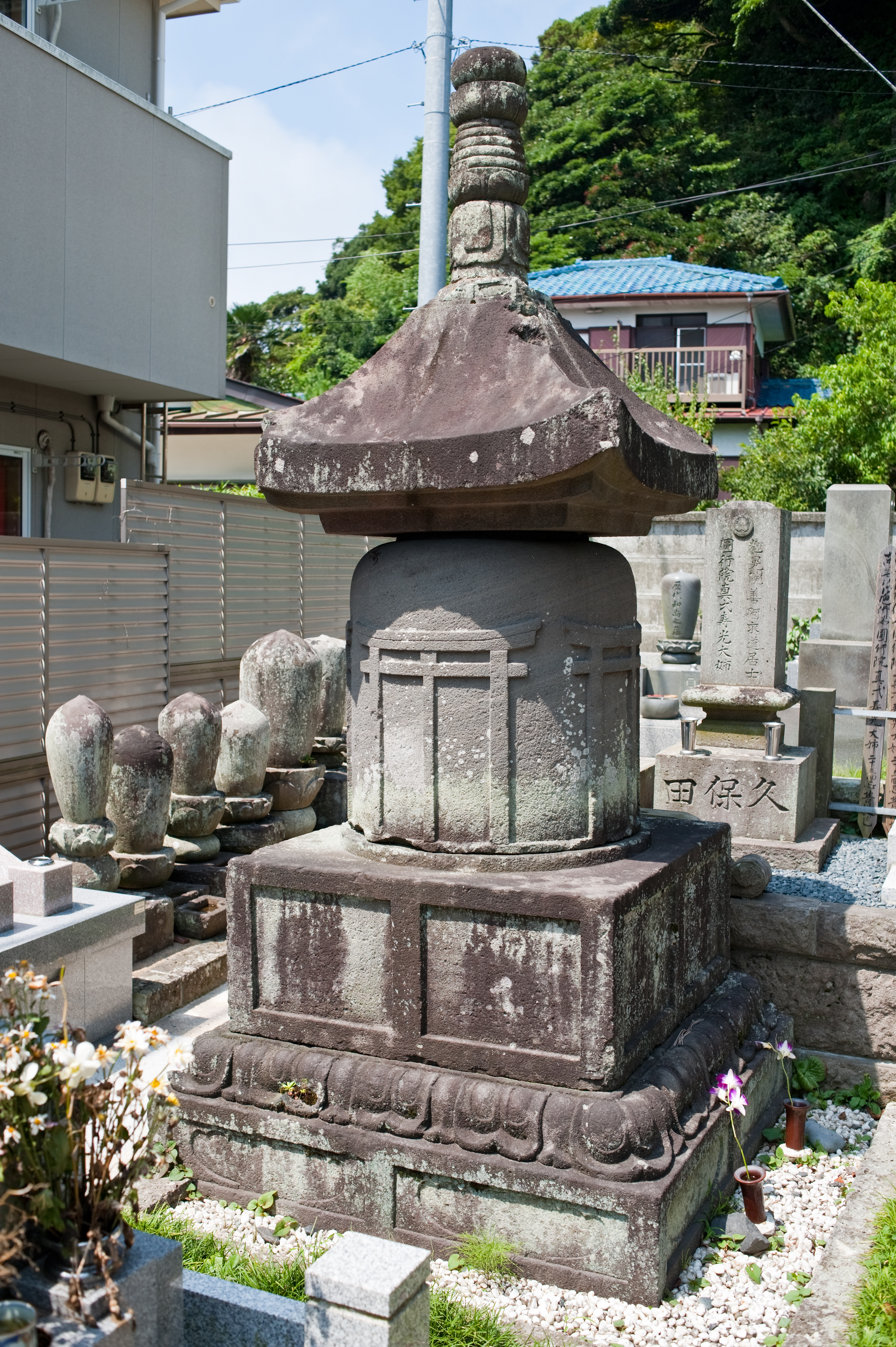
A hōtō

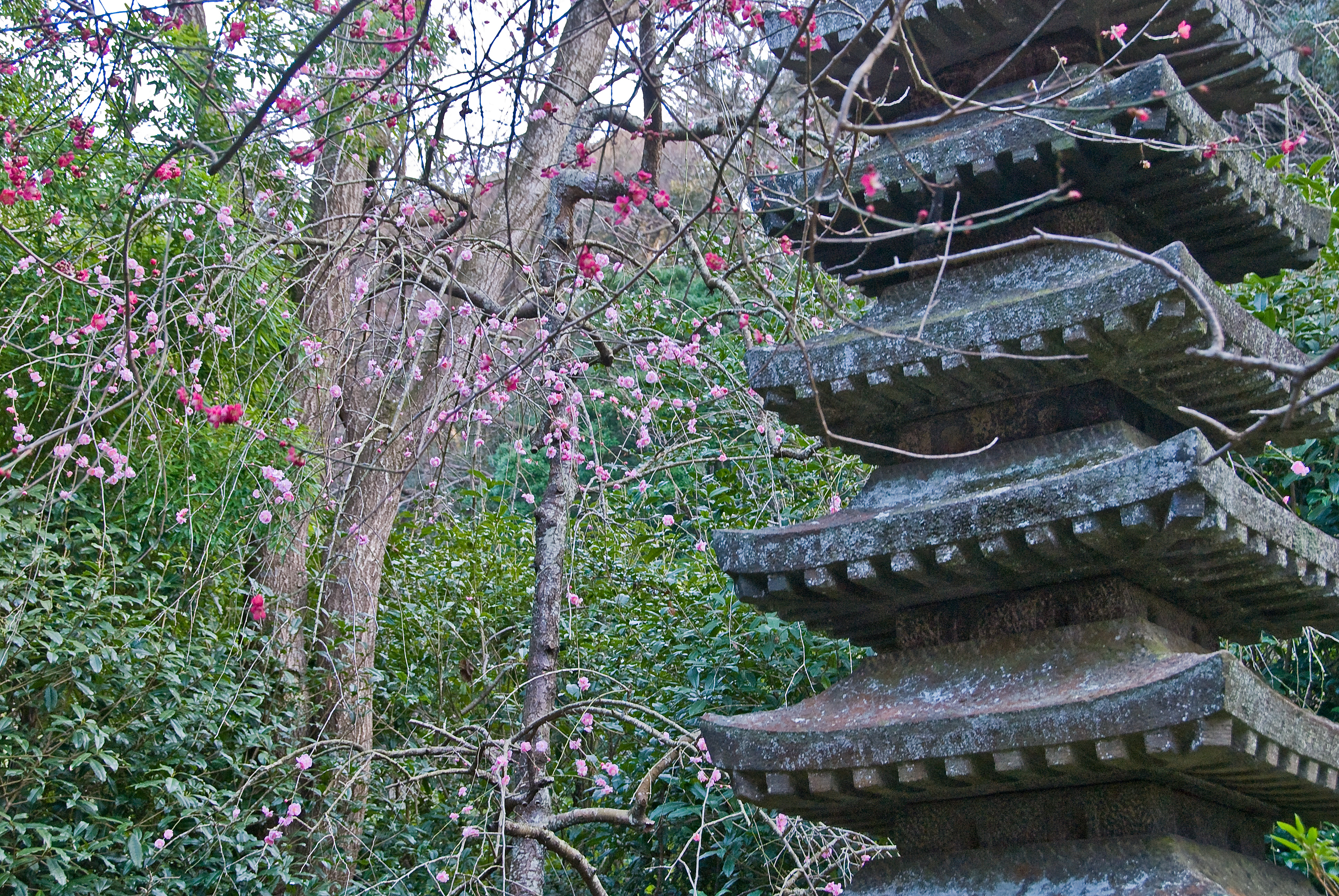
A stone tasōtō

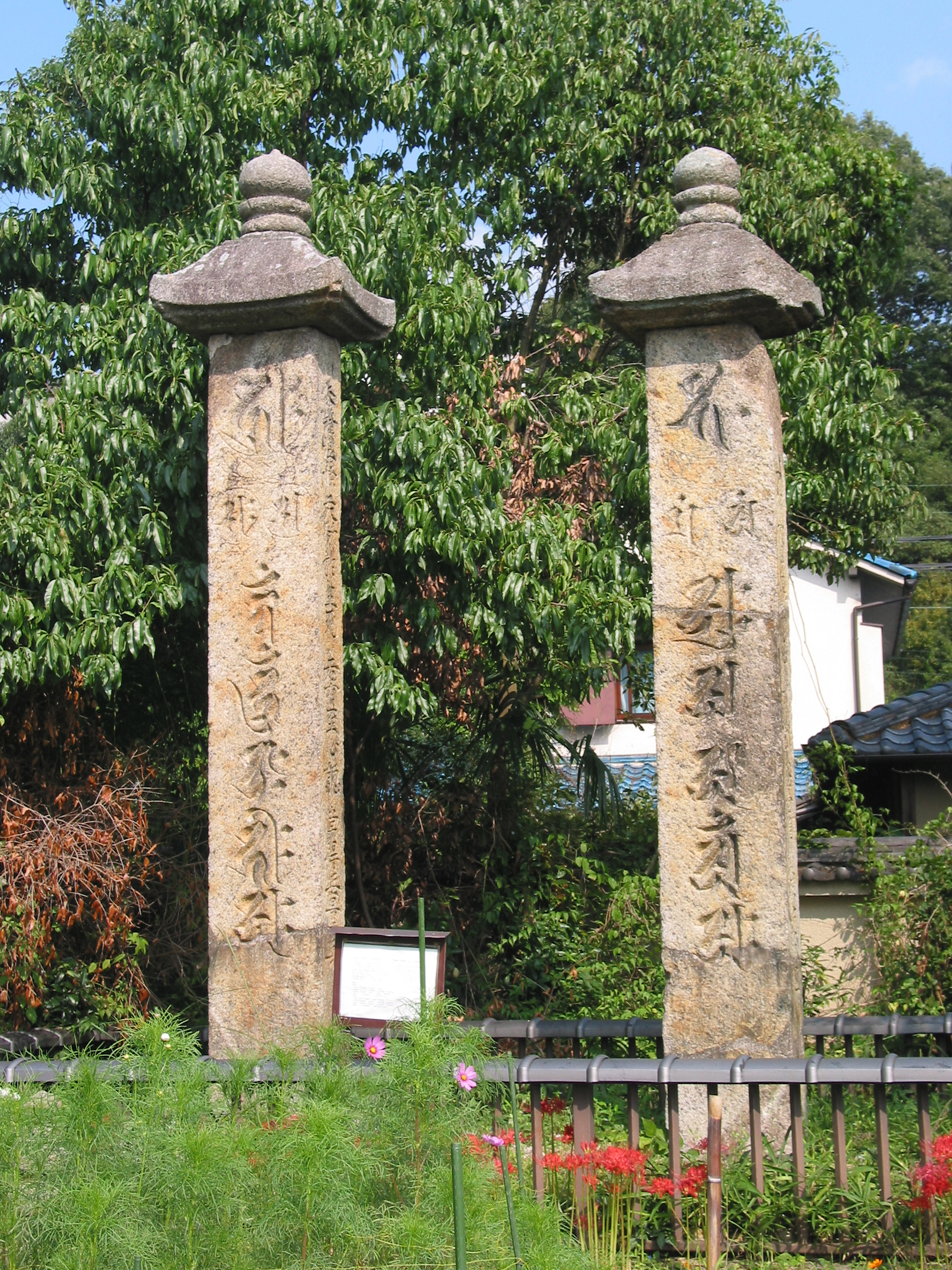
Two kasatōba at Hannya-ji, Nara

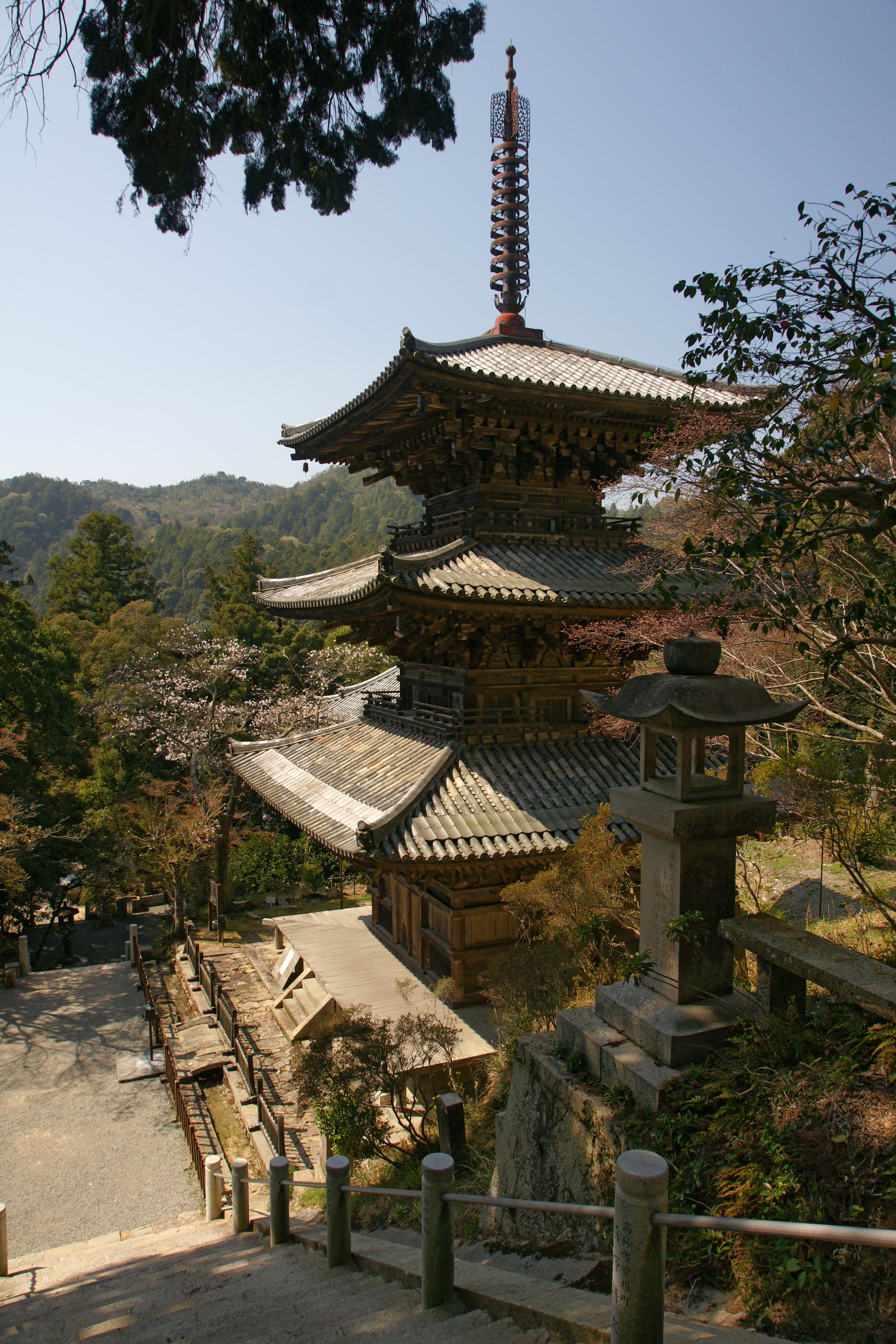
Ichijō-ji's sanjū-no-tō (three storied pagoda). It was built in 1171.

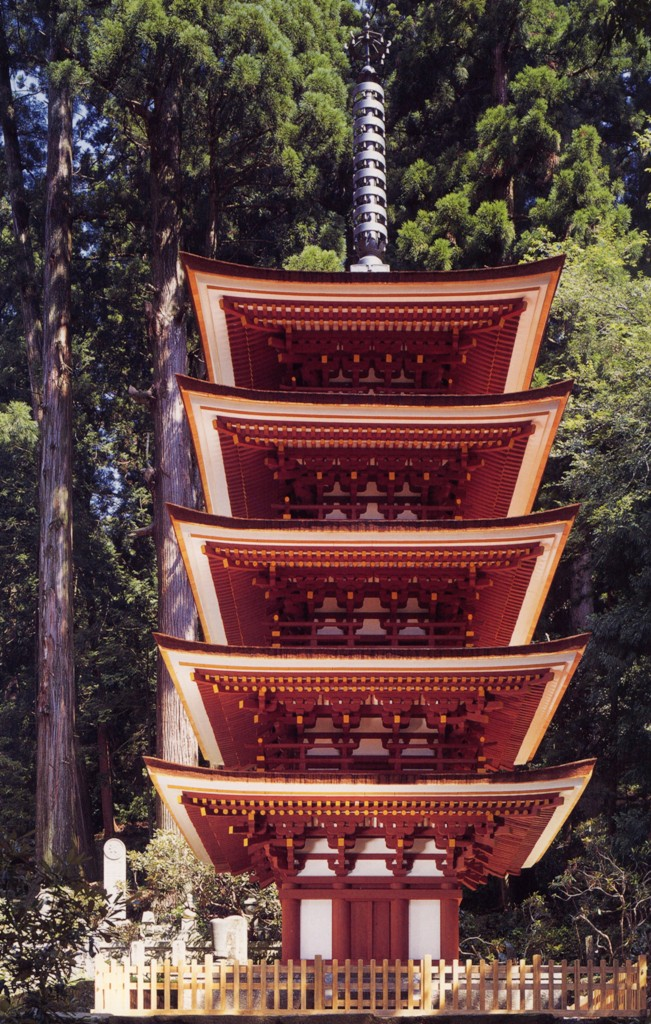
Murō-ji's gojū-no-tō (five storied pagoda). It was built in 800.

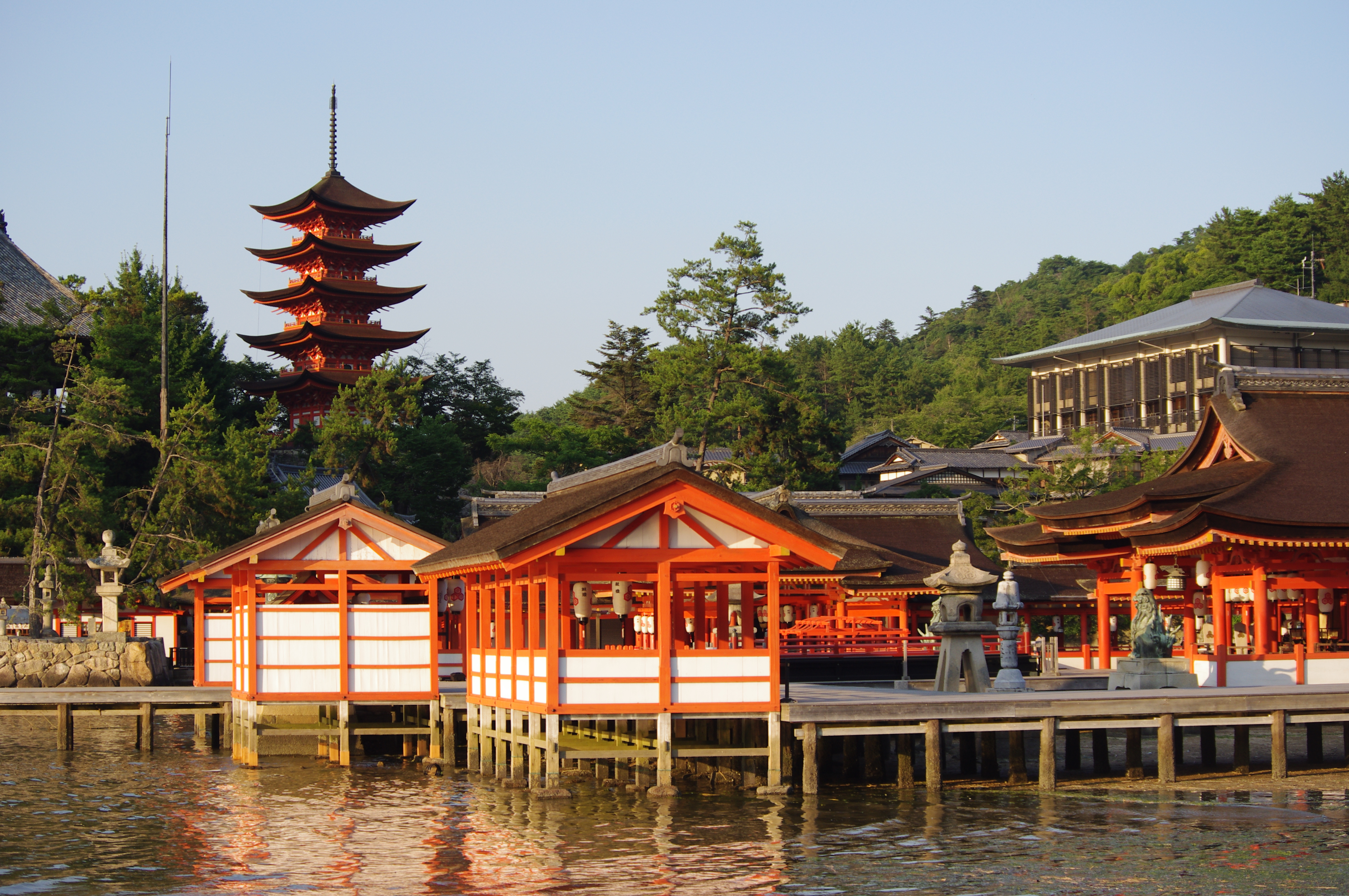
A pagoda at a Shinto shrine, Itsukushima Shrine

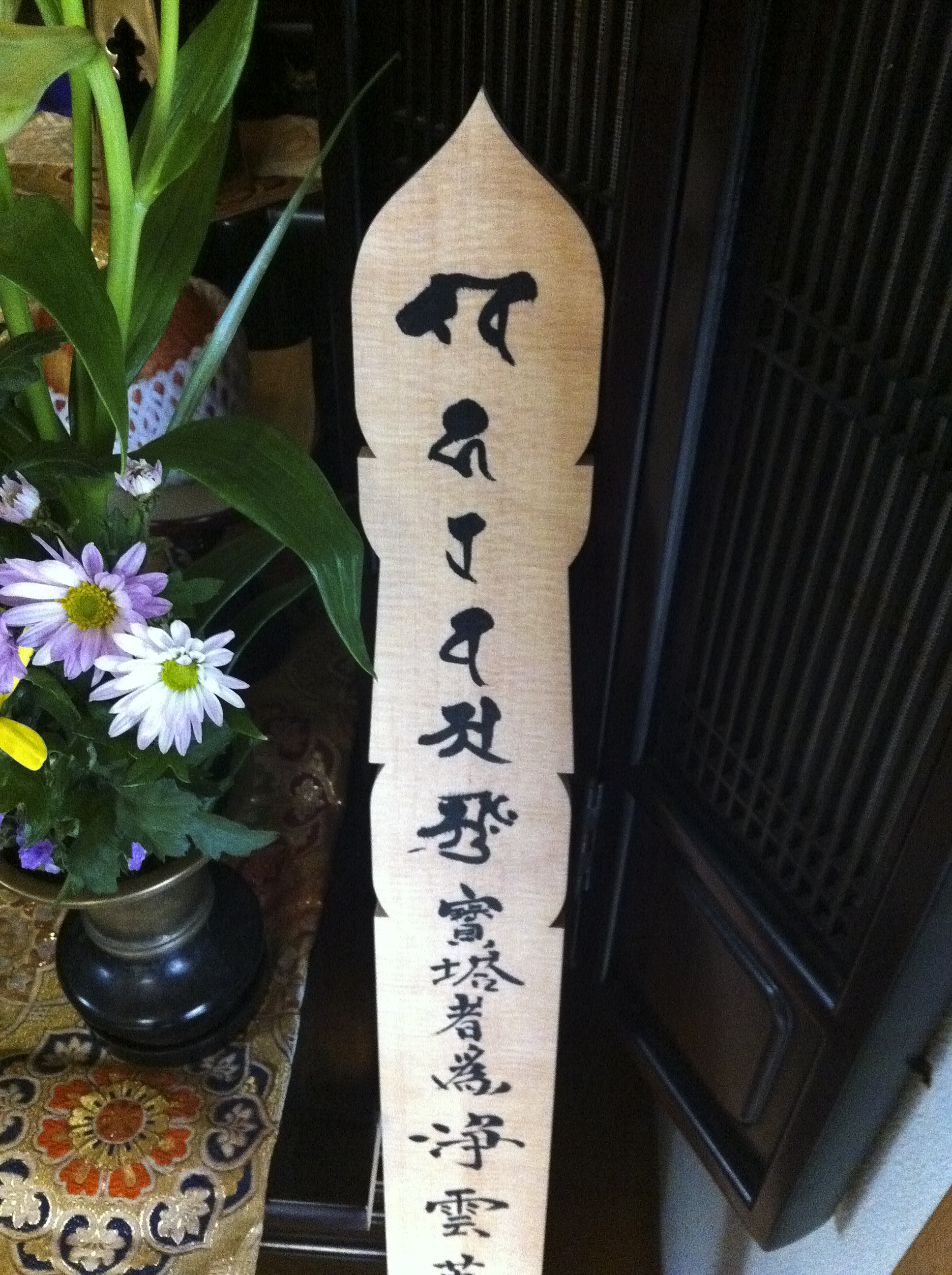
A sotōba. Clearly visible is the division in five sections.

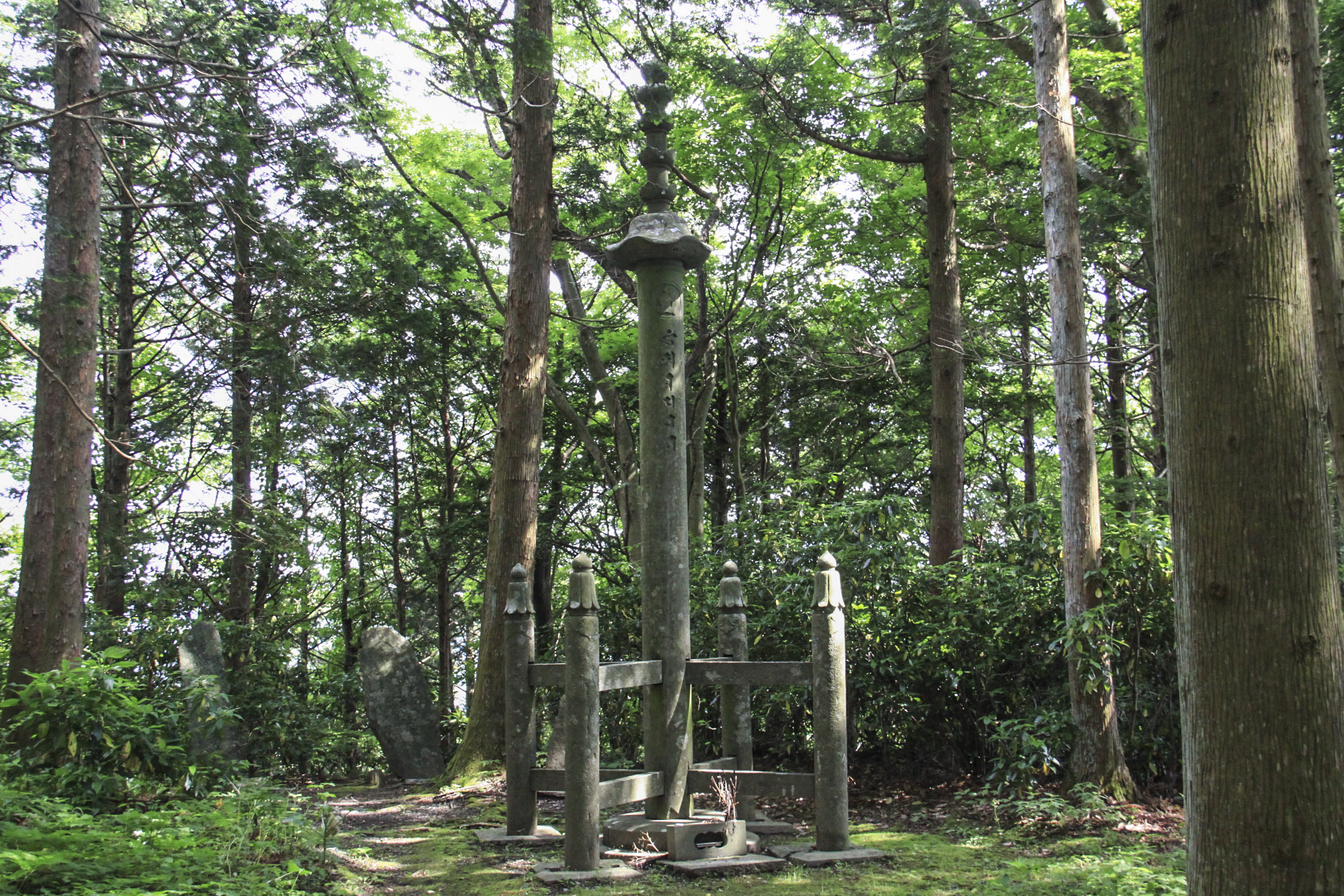
A sorintō

== See also ==
- Shinbashira, the suspended wooden column inside

== Bibliography ==
- Iwanami Kōjien (広辞苑) Japanese dictionary, 6th Edition (2008), DVD version
- "JAANUS". Japanese Architecture and Art Net Users System.
- Fujita Masaya, Koga Shūsaku, ed. (April 10, 1990). Nihon Kenchiku-shi (in Japanese) (September 30, 2008 ed.). Shōwa-dō. ISBN 4-8122-9805-9.
- Scheid, Bernhard. "Japanische Pagoden" (in German). University of Vienna.
- Shinkō no Katachi - Hōkyōintō, Yatsushiro Municipal Museum, accessed on September 18, 2008 (in Japanese)
