= Myōhō-ji =

Buddhist temple in Kamakura, Kanagawa, Japan

Coordinates: 35°18′46.48″N 139°33′32.77″E

Ryōgonzan Rengein Myōhō-ji
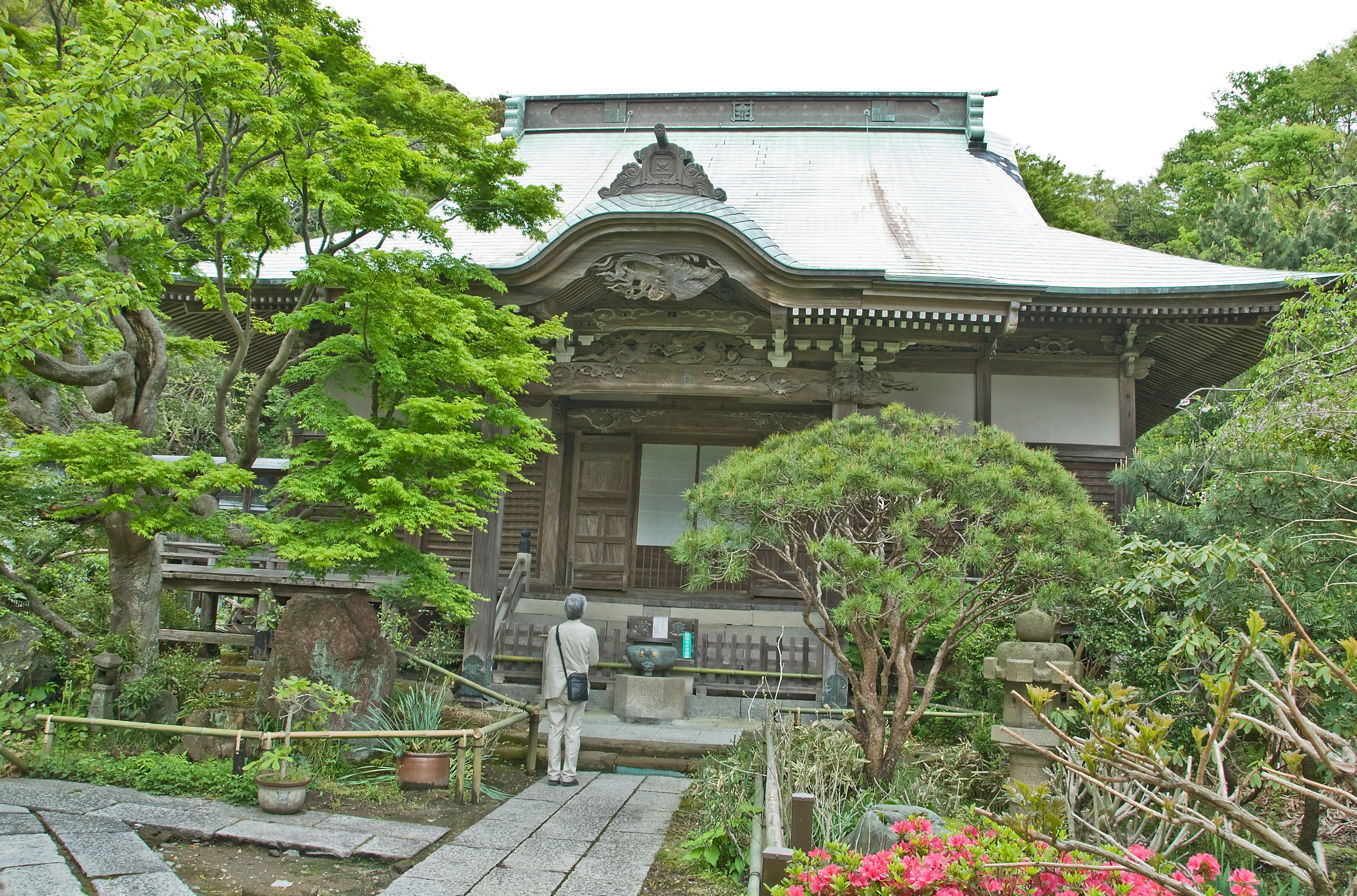
- The Main Hall

Religion
- Affiliation: Nichiren

Location
- Location: 7-4, Ōmachi 4-chome, Kamakura, Kanagawa 248-0007
- Country: Japan
- Interactive map of Ryōgonzan Rengein Myōhō-ji

Architecture
- Founder: Nichiren
- Completed: 1253

Website
- None

Myōhō-ji temple garden, before 1880

Ryōgonzan Renge-in Myōhō-ji (楞厳山蓮華院妙法寺) is a Buddhist temple of the Nichiren sect in Kamakura, Kanagawa, Japan. It is one of a group of three built near the site in Matsubagayatsu, or the Valley of Pine Needles (松葉ヶ谷), where Nichiren, founder of the Buddhist sect that bears his name, is supposed to have had his hut. The temple has also close ties with Prince Morinaga and the Imperial House.

== Nichiren, Matsubagayatsu and Myōhō-ji ==
Kamakura is known for having been in the 13th century the cradle of Nichiren Buddhism. Founder Nichiren was not born there: he came from Awa Province, in today's Chiba Prefecture, and had come to Kamakura because at the time the city was the cultural and political center of the country. He built himself a hut in the Matsubagayatsu district where three temples (Ankokuron-ji, Myōhō-ji, and Chōshō-ji), have been fighting for centuries for the honor of being his sole heir. All three say they lie on the very spot where he used to have his hut, however none of them can prove its claims. The Shinpen Kamakurashi, a guide book to Kamakura commissioned by Tokugawa Mitsukuni in 1685, already mentions a strained relationship between Myōhō-ji and Chōshō-ji. However, when the two temples finally went to court, with a sentence emitted in 1787 by the shogunate's tribunals Myōhō-ji won the right to claim to be the place where Nichiren had his hermitage. It appears that Ankokuron-ji did not participate in the trial because the government's official position was that Nichiren had his first hut there, when he first arrived in Kamakura, but that he made another near Myōhō-ji after he came back from his exile in Izu in 1263.

According to the temple's records, Nichiren first settled down here in 1253 and left for Minobu in 1272. Every year in August a special ceremony called Yakuyoke Shōga (厄除け生姜) is held at the temple to commemorate the so-called "Matsubagayatsu Persecution", an episode in which Nichiren had to hide from his persecutors in the forest near Nagoe, towards Zushi, and was fed with ginger by a white monkey. Not only does the temple claim to have the ruins of the hut in which he used to live, but the very path Nichiren is supposed to have taken to escape to Nagoe leaves the temple from above the hill behind the main hall.

== History of the temple ==
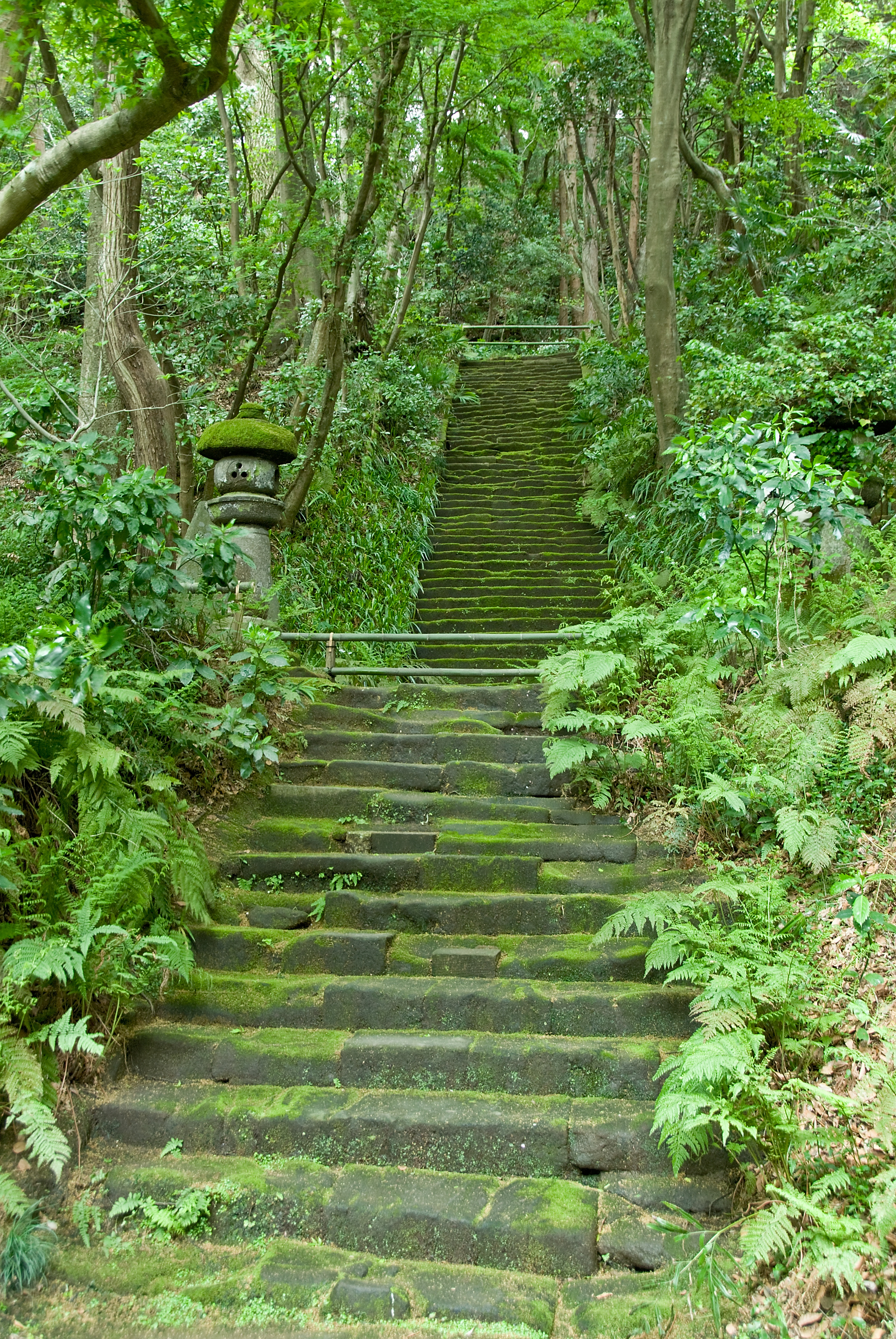
Myōhō-ji's mossy stairs

The site was originally occupied by a temple called Honkuku-ji (本国寺), which was later transferred to Kyoto. Its first chief abbots were men from important families, and one of them was Nichiro, better known as Nichiei, the name he assumed when he became a priest, who was an uncle of Ashikaga Takauji and the temple's fifth chief abbot. Nichiei was a natural son of Prince Morinaga, and for this reason he rebuilt the temple in 1357 dedicating it to his father. Nichiei was born from a woman called Minami no Ōnkata, who attended the prince while he was a prisoner of the Ashikaga in the cave now at Kamakura-gū. He and his mother are buried within the temple, while Prince Morinaga's grave is in nearby Nikaidō. Nichiei installed two cenotaphs in memory of his parents on top of the hill behind the main hall. During the Edo period the temple was protected and maintained by the Tokugawa and their vassals. The temple is supposed to have been entrusted to Nichiei by Nichiren himself.

== Main features ==
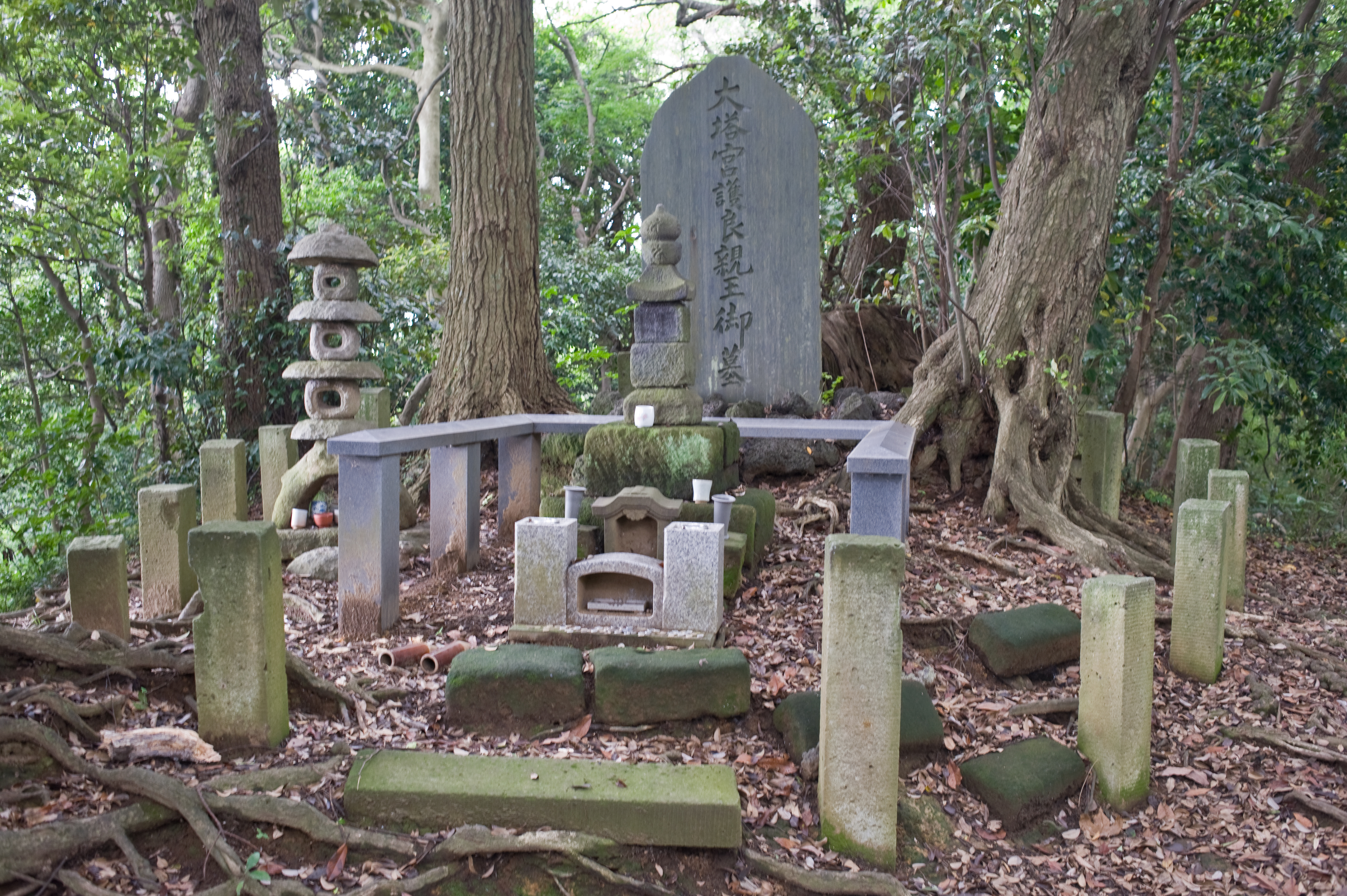
Cenotaph to Prince Morinaga

The main hall near the entrance contains, among other things, a small bone fragment said to be a relic of Nichiren and an effigy of Prince Morinaga. Like all other buildings of the complex, it is always closed to the public.

The building to the left of the main hall is called Daigakuden, and hosts statues of Shaka Nyorai, Katō Kiyomasa and Inari Myōjin, the kami of harvests.

The Niō gate behind them leads to the 50-step mossy stairway which today is the temple's main claim to fame, and which has gained it the above-mentioned nickname "Kokedera". At the bottom of the stairs are two caves, of which one hosts a statue of Nichiren, while the other is a mausoleum to many of the priests that have lived here. Above the mossy stairs there is a third building called Hokkedō, or Hall of Scriptures.

Above the Hokkedō stands a monument, erected by the temple in the spot where allegedly Nichiren had his hut. As already mentioned, the exact point where the hut really stood has been the subject of much controversy for the past few centuries. Its plaque (in Japanese) reads:

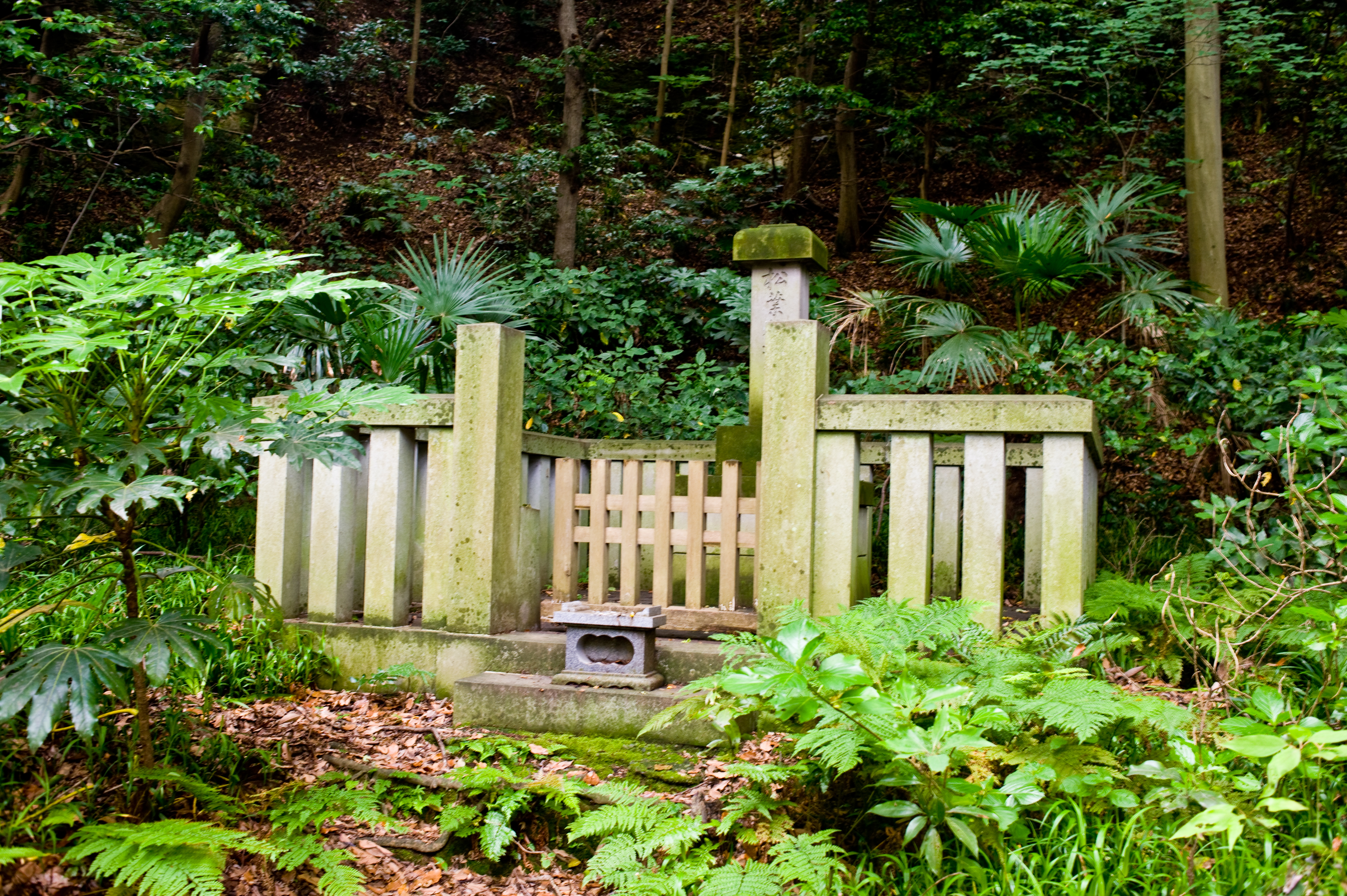
The monument on the spot where Nichiren's hut allegedly used to stand

Nichiren's Matsubagayatsu's Hut
In 1253 Nichiren founded Nichiren Buddhism at Awa province's Seichō-ji (清澄寺) and, in the summer of the same year, he came to Kamakura's Nagoe，made his hut, chanted the Daimoku, and wrote his Risshō Ankokuron. From here he spread his new religion until 1271.

Further on are the temple's bronze bell and the cenotaphs to Prince Morinaga and his wife. The plaque next to Prince Morinaga's cenotaph (in Japanese) reads:

Morinaga Shinnō, son of Emperor Go-Daigo Father of this temple's fifth abbott Nichiei

He fought actively for the establishment of the Kenmu restoration and was nominated Seii Taishogun by his father, but was imprisoned in a cave in Kamakura's Nikaidō. On August 12, 1335 (second year of the Kenmu era, 23rd day of the seventh month), his tormented life was violently ended. He was 28. The tombs of Minami no Ōnkata, Nichiei's wife, and of Nichiei's himself are also within this temple.

== See also ==
- Glossary of Japanese Buddhism
