= Chōshō-ji =

Buddhist temple in Kamakura, Kanagawa, Japan

Coordinates: 35°18′36.78″N 139°33′24.56″E

Ishiizan Chōshō-ji
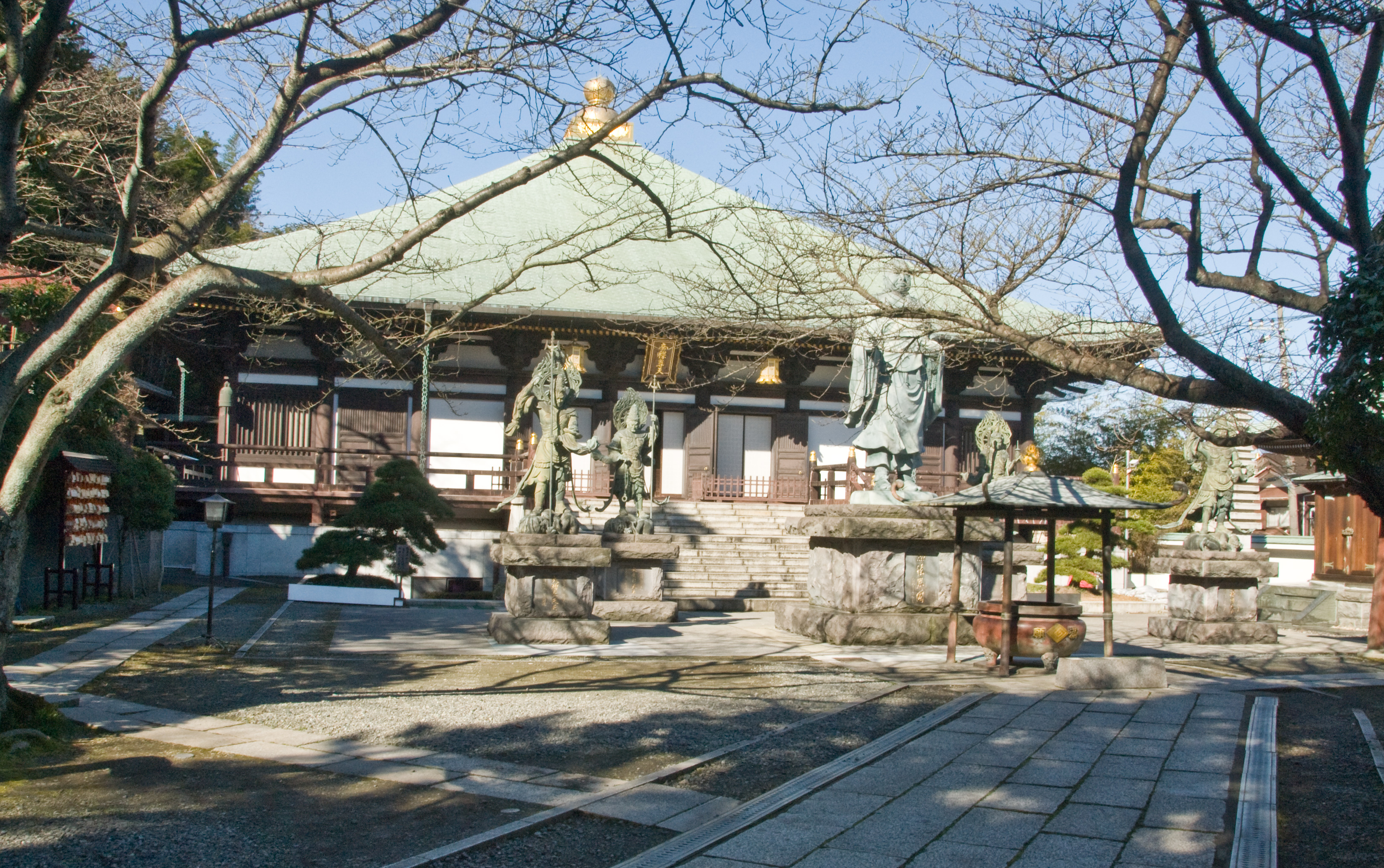
- The Taishakudō, the statue of Nichiren and the four Deva Kings

Religion
- Affiliation: Nichiren Buddhism

Location
- Location: 12-17, Zaimokuza 2-chome, Kamakura, Kanagawa 248-0013
- Country: Japan
- Interactive map of Ishiizan Chōshō-ji

Architecture
- Founder: Ishii Nagakatsu and Nichiren (founding priest)
- Completed: 1263

Website
- None

Ishiizan Chōshō-ji (石井山長勝寺) is a Buddhist temple of the Nichiren Shū in Kamakura, Kanagawa, Japan. It's one of a group of three built near the site in Matsubagayatsu (Valley of Pine Needles (松葉ヶ谷)) where Nichiren, founder of the Buddhist sect that bears his name, is supposed to have had his hut. The first part of its name is derived from the founder's last name (Ishii), the second is an alternative reading of the characters for Nagakatsu, the founder's first name.

== Nichiren, Matsubagayatsu and Chōshō–ji ==
Kamakura is known among Buddhists for having been during the 13th century the cradle of Nichiren Buddhism. Founder Nichiren wasn't a native: he was born in Awa Province, in today's Chiba Prefecture, but it was only natural for a preacher to come to Kamakura because at the time the city was the cultural and political center of the country. He settled down in a hut in the Matsubagayatsu district where three temples (Ankokuron-ji, Myōhō–ji, and Chōshō-ji), have been fighting for centuries for the honor of being the sole heir of the master. All three say they lie on the very spot where he used to have his hut, however none of them can prove its claims. The Shinpen Kamakurashi, a guide book to Kamakura commissioned by Tokugawa Mitsukuni in 1685, already mentions a strained relationship between Myōhō–ji and Chōshō-ji. However, when the two temples finally went to court, with a sentence emitted in 1787 by the shogunate's tribunals Myōhō–ji won the right to claim to be the place where Nichiren had his hermitage. It appears that Ankokuron-ji didn't participate in the trial because the government's official position was that Nichiren had first his hut there, when he first arrived in Kamakura, but that he made another near Myōhō–ji after he came back from his exile in Izu in 1263. What Chōshō-ji claims are the remains of the hut lie near the entrance of the Zaimokuza Reien cemetery, outside the temple's premises.

The temple was built by Ishii Nagakatsu, lord of this land in 1263, ten years after the other two. Even if it were built with Ankokuron-ji and Myōhō-ji by Nichiren when he entered Kamakura, the present temple is a later reconstruction by someone else. Whatever the truth, Chōshō-ji seems therefore to be the party in the dispute with the weakest arguments.

== Features ==
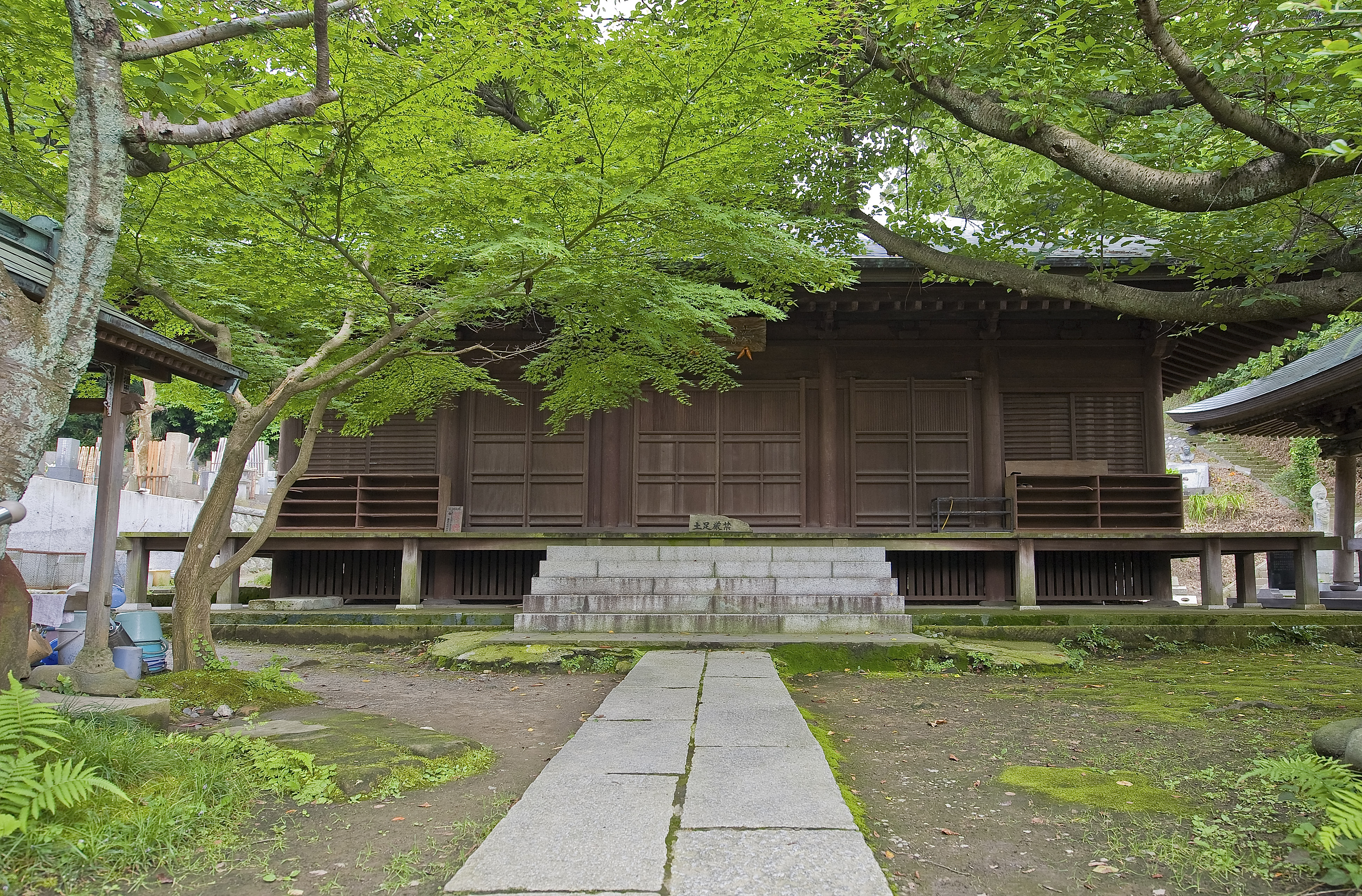
Chōshō-ji's Hokke-dō

Next to the temple's gate stands a huge statue of Nichiren himself surrounded by four Deva Kings, who are there to protect and serve him.

Because at the time of his persecution Nichiren was saved by a white monkey, believed to be a retainer of god Taishakuten, the great building behind the statue (the Taishaku-dō) is dedicated to him.

A little above the Taishaku-dō stands the Hokke-dō, a small building which is the temple's de facto main hall. The building, originally built during the Muromachi period, is an Important Cultural Property. It contains three more Important Cultural Properties: a gong (waniguchi), a lacquered dining table (kakeban), and a candle stand (shokudai).

Every year on February 11 the temple hosts the Daikokutōe Seiman Matsuri (大国祷会成満祭り) Ceremony during which Buddhist priests douse themselves with cold water to pray for the country's safety. About 150 Nichiren priests from all over the country come here for the ceremony, participation to which being a precondition to be allowed to perform religious services.
