= Ankokuron-ji =

Buddhist temple in Kanagawa, Japan

Coordinates: 35°18′41.23″N 139°33′31.41″E

Myōhōkekyōzan Ankokuron-ji
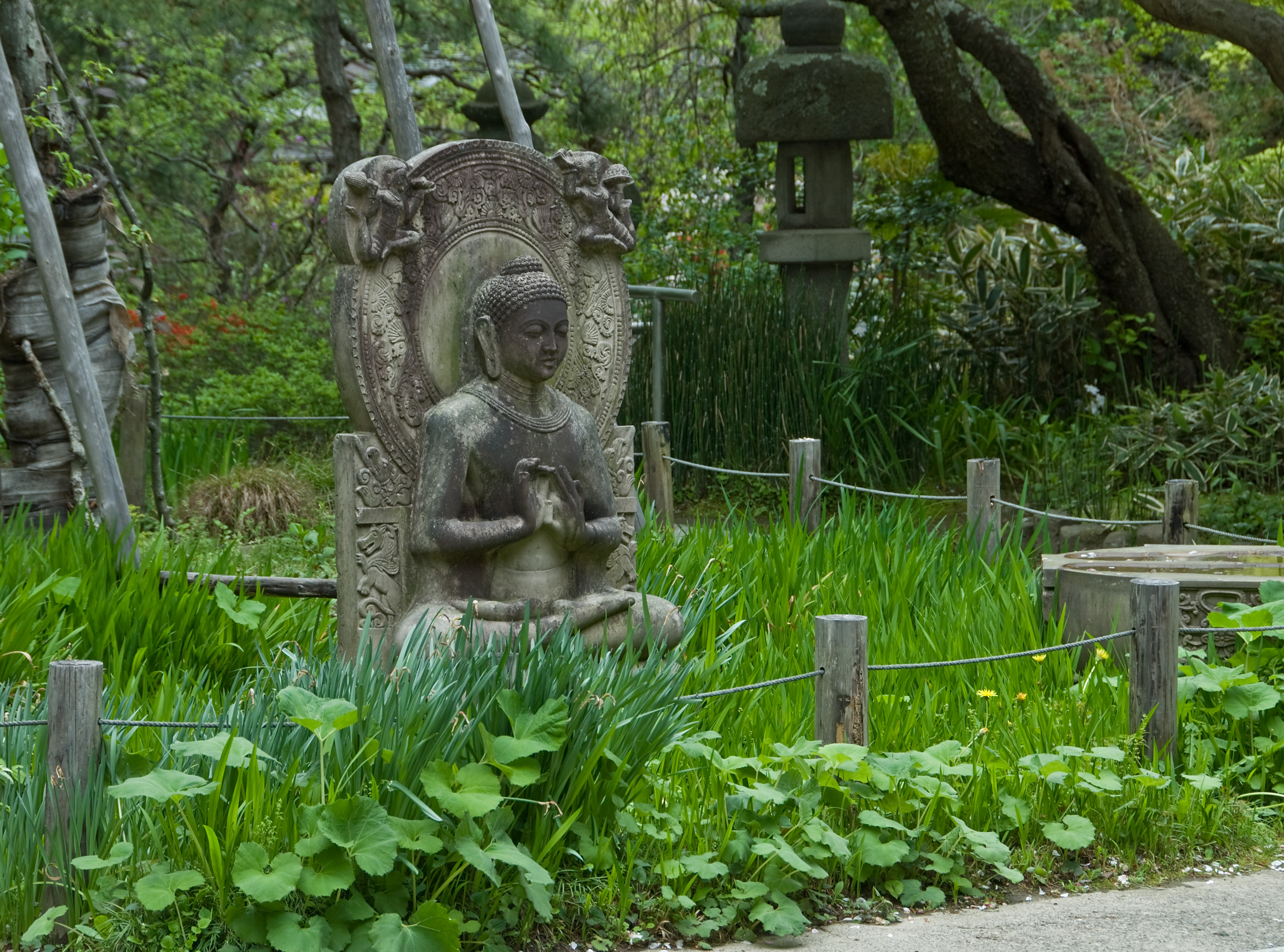
- The garden

Religion
- Affiliation: Nichiren

Location
- Location: 4-18, Ōmachi 4-chome, Kamakura, Kanagawa 248-0007
- Country: Japan
- Interactive map of Myōhōkekyōzan Ankokuron-ji

Architecture
- Founder: Nichiren
- Completed: 1253

Website
- None

Myōhōkekyōzan Ankokuron-ji (妙法華経山安国論寺) is a Buddhist temple of the Nichiren sect in Kamakura, Kanagawa, Japan. It is one of a group of three built near the site in Matsubagayatsu (Valley of Pine Needles (松葉ヶ谷) where Nichiren, founder of the Buddhist sect that bears his name, is supposed to have had his hut.

== Nichiren, Matsubagayatsu and Ankokuron–ji ==
Kamakura is known among Buddhists for having been during the 13th century the cradle of Nichiren Buddhism. Founder Nichiren wasn't a native: he was born in Awa Province, in today's Chiba Prefecture, but it had been only natural for a preacher like him to come to Kamakura because at the time the city was the cultural and political center of the country. He settled down in a hut in the Matsubagayatsu district where three temples (Ankokuron-ji itself, Myōhō–ji, and Chōshō-ji), have been fighting for centuries for the honor of being the sole heir of the master. All three say they lie on the very spot where he used to have his hut, however none of them can prove its claims. The Shinpen Kamakurashi, a guide book to Kamakura commissioned by Tokugawa Mitsukuni in 1685, already mentions a strained relationship between Myōhō–ji and Chōshō—ji. However, when the two temples finally went to court, with a sentence emitted in 1787 by the shogunate's tribunals Myōhō–ji won the right to claim to be the place where Nichiren had had his hermitage. It appears that Ankokuron-ji did not participate in the trial because the government's official position was that Nichiren had first his hut there when he first arrived in Kamakura, but that he later made another near Myōhō–ji after he came back from his exile in Izu in 1263.

Ankokuron-ji is named after the Risshō Ankoku Ron (立正安国論), Nichiren's first major treatise and the source of the first of his three persecutions. Because of it, he was almost executed, pardoned and banished to Sado Island. The essay is said to have actually been written in the small cave visible at the right of the temple's entrance. The black stele erected in 1939 by the Kamakura Seinendan which stands in front of the temple's gate commemorates the fact:

In 1253 Nichiren arrived in Kamakura from Kominato in Awa province (Chiba) (today's Chiba prefecture), settled down here and started chanting the Lotus Sutra. This is the place where later, for three years beginning in 1257, he wrote his essay Risshō Ankoku Ron in a cave.

== Features ==
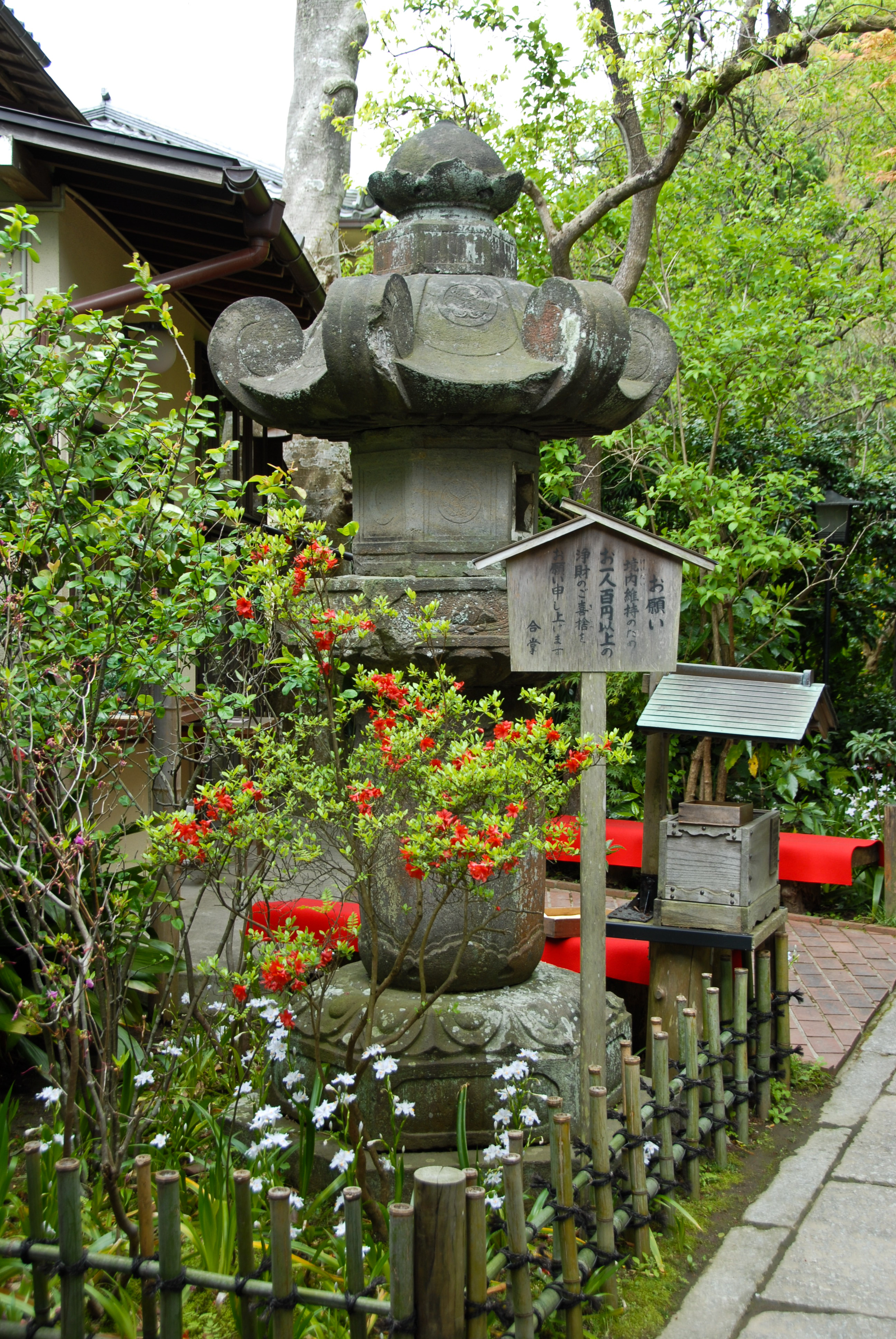
One of the stone lanterns brought from Zōjō-ji, in Tokyo

The stone lanterns near the gate were brought here from Tokyo's Zōjō-ji, one of the two Tokugawa funerary temples. To their right lies the so-called Goshoan (御小庵, Small Hermitage), built on the place where Nichiren wrote the Risshō Ankoku Ron. The old tree in front of it is said to have been planted by Nichiren himself, who had brought the sapling from Chiba. Further ahead lies the main hall, rebuilt in 1963 after having been destroyed by fire.

Beyond the main hall, in the cemetery lies Nichiren's funerary pavilion, which contains his ashes. .

Above it, the Nanmenkutsu (南面窟, South-facing cave) is the place where Nichiren is supposed to have hidden in 1260 when attackers burned his hut down. The statue of a white monkey in it commemorates his salvation at the hands of the animal, who led him to safety and fed him. The white monkey is an attendant of the Sannō Gongen, a kami who is a manifestation of Buddhist god Taishakuten.

Following the mountain path beyond the cave one reaches first, on a ridge above the entrance, the temple's bronze Bell of Peace, then the spot where Nichiren used to go every day to see Mount Fuji, the Fujimidai. From it are visible, besides the volcano, the city of Kamakura, its beach, and Hakone.

Going down the stone stairs the visitor returns to the entrance, where stands the Kumaō Daizenjin Sonden (熊王大善神尊殿) (an Inari shrine enshrining a samurai who served Nichiren).
