= Nichizō =

- 日像

Personal life
- Born: 1269
- Died: 1342 (aged 72–73)

Religious life
- Religion: Buddhism
- Temple: Myoken-ji (妙顕寺)
- School: Nichiren Buddhism
- Sect: Nichiren-shū

Senior posting
- Teacher: Nichirō

Nichizō (日像, 1269–1342) was one of Nichirō's nine senior disciples (not to be confused with the six senior disciples of Nichiren). He was responsible for giving Nichiren Buddhism official imperial recognition in 1321. He was exiled twice while attempting to achieve this goal.

According to Cosmology of Kyoto 京都千年物語, an adventure game developed by Softedge and published by Yano Electric, Nichizō was a 10th century Buddhist monk, who studied SHINGON BUDDHISM at TOJI, then took ascetic spiritual training at Mount Kinpu. During a severe exercise, he died and toured the DARK WORLDS for 13 days, then revived. In "JOURNEY IN DARKNESS", he wrote of meeting SUGAWARA NO MICHIZANE's ghost, and seeing EMPEROR DAIGO suffer in Hell for causing Michizane's bitter death. Nichizō is credited with various miracles, including the disappearance of his remains when he died of old age.
