= Nichirō =

Japanese Buddhist monk (1245–1320)

- 日朗

Personal life
- Born: 1245
- Died: 1320 (aged 74–75)

Religious life
- Religion: Buddhism
- Temple: Ikegami Honmon-ji
- School: Nichiren Buddhism
- Sect: Nichiren-shū

Senior posting
- Teacher: Nichiren
- Students: Nichizō, Nichiin, Nichirin, Nichizen, Nichiden, Nichihan, Nitcho, Nichigyo, Rokei

Nichirō (日朗, 1245–1320) was a Buddhist disciple of Nichiren, the nephew of Nisshō.

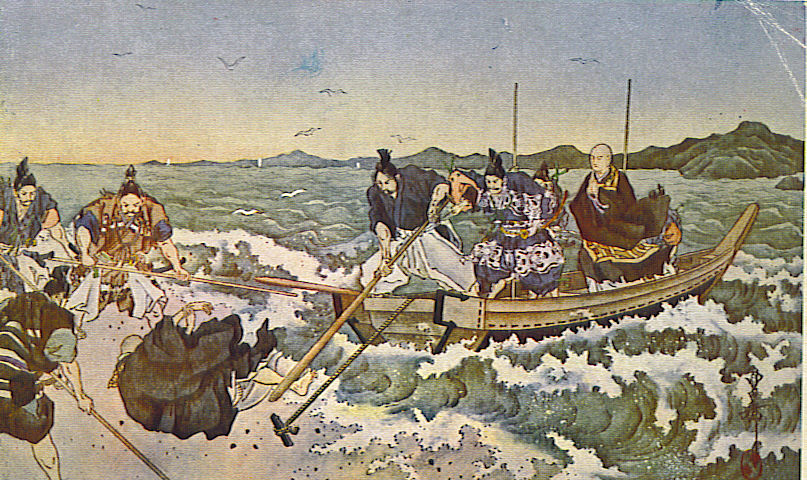
Nichirō wants to follow Nichiren when Nichiren is exiled in 1261; but Nichirō is forbidden to do so — Postcard artwork, circa 1920s.

Nichirō agreed with Nisshō's defense of Nichiren as a Tendai reformer. He founded a practice hall that became part of Ikegami Honmon-ji, the site of Nichiren's death. His school is now part of Nichiren-shū.

Nichirō designated nine senior disciples. Among them were Nichizō and Nichiin.
