= Eternal Buddha =

In East Asian Buddhism, Shakyamuni Buddha of the Essential Teachings (Chapters 15–28) of the Lotus Sutra is considered the eternal Buddha. In the sixteenth chapter of the Lotus Sutra, Shakyamuni Buddha reveals that he actually attained Buddhahood in the inconceivably remote past. The Eternal Buddha is contrasted to Shakyamuni Buddha who attained enlightenment for the first time in India, which was taught in the pre-Lotus Sutra teachings.

The belief in the Eternal Buddha transcends through time and is commonly associated with Shakyamuni Buddha, but can also refer to both his past and future incarnations. However, no exact definition of the Eternal Buddha is defined in the Lotus Sutra, which was also revealed by Siddhartha Gautama; thereby making open interpretations to various religious groups.

== Lotus Sutra and tathagatagarbha doctrine ==
In east-Asian Buddhism, the Buddha of the Lotus Sutra is regarded as the eternal Buddha. The Tathagata's "Lifespan" chapter (ch 16) of the Lotus Sutra portrays the Buddha as indicating that he became awakened countless aeons ("kalpas") ago. The sutra itself, however, does not directly employ the phrase "eternal Buddha".

In China the Lotus Sutra was associated with the Mahaparinirvana Sutra, which propagates the tathagatagarbha-doctrine, and with the "Awakening of Faith". The Mahaparinirvana Sutra presents the Buddha as eternal and equates him with the Dharmakaya. (Note: Commenting on the Mahayana Mahaparinirvana Sutra, Guang Xing writes: "One of the main themes of the Mahayana Mahaparinirvana Sutra is that the Buddha is eternal, a theme very much in contrast with the Hinayana idea that the Buddha departed forever after his final nirvana. The Mahayanists assert the eternity of the Buddha in two ways in the Mahaparinirvana Sutra. They state that the Buddha is the dharmakaya, and hence eternal. Next, they re-interpret the liberation of the Buddha as mahaparinirvana possessing four attributes: eternity, happiness, self and purity. In other words, according to the Mahayanists, the fact that the Buddha abides in the mahaparinirvana means not that he has departed for ever, but that he perpetually abides in intrinsic quiescence. The Buddha abiding in intrinsic quiescence is none other than the dharmakaya [...] This dharmakaya is the real Buddha. It is on this doctrinal foundation that the Mahaparinirvana Sutra declares: "the dharmakaya has [the attributes of] eternity (nitya), happiness (sukha), self (atman) and purity (subha) and is perpetually free from birth, old age, sickness, death and all other sufferings [...] It exists eternally without change."")

The Lotus Sutra itself does hardly seem to accept the tathagatagarbha-teachings. According to Paul Williams, this association may be explained by the systematization of the Lotus Sutra teachings by the Tiantai school, using teachings from other schools "to equate the Buddha of the Lotus Sutra with the ultimate truth and to teach a cosmic Buddha."

== Understanding in east-Asian Buddhism ==
=== China ===
The Chinese Tiantai scholar Zhiyi (538–597) divided the sutra into the "trace teaching" about the historical Shakyamuni Buddha (ch 1–14) and the "origin teaching" (ch 15–28) revealing the original Buddha of inconceivable life span. Zhiyi viewed Shakyamuni Buddha of Chapter 16 of the Lotus Sutra as a unification of the three Buddha bodies, possessing all three bodies, whereas other sutras are taught from the standpoint of a single Buddha body.

=== Japan ===
The Nichiren Shu, Rissho Kosei Kai and Kempon Hokke schools of Nichiren Buddhism revere Shakyamuni of Chapter 16 of the Lotus Sutra as the eternal Buddha. They also regard Shakyamuni of Chapter 16 as a "Unification of the Three Bodies", as taught by Tiantai. Other Buddhas, such as Amida of the Jōdo and Jōdo Shinshū Schools, and Mahāvairocana of the Shingon School are seen as provisional manifestations of the Original Buddha Shakyamuni.

In Jōdo Shinshū or Pure Land Buddhism, Amida Buddha is viewed as the eternal Buddha who manifested as Shakyamuni in India and who is the personification of Nirvana itself.

Shingon Buddhism sees Vairochana Buddha as the personification of the dharmakaya, and hence as the eternal Buddha, and some within Shingon, following Kakuban, equate Vairochana and Amida.

== See also ==
- Adi-Buddha
- Angulimaliya Sutra
- Lotus Sutra
- Mahaparinirvana Sutra
- Srimala Sutra
- Tathagatagarbha Sutra
- Tathagatagarbha
- Trikaya
- Eternal Christ

== Sources ==
- Buswell, Robert E., ed. (2004), Encyclopedia of Buddhism, Macmillan Reference USA, ISBN 0-02-865718-7
- Fuss, Michael (1991), Buddhavacana and Dei verbum : a phenomenological and theological comparison of scriptural inspiration in the Saddharmapuṇḍarīka sūtra and in the Christian tradition, Leiden; New York: E.J. Brill, ISBN 9004089918
- Leighton, Taigen Dan (2007). Visions of Awakening Space and Time: Dogen and the Lotus Sutra. New York: Oxford University Press. ISBN 978-0-19-532093-0.
- Pye, Michael (1978). Skilful means : a concept in Mahayana Buddhism. London: Duckworth. ISBN 0-7156-1266-2.
- The English Buddhist Dictionary Committee (2009). The Soka Gakkai Dictionary of Buddhism. Delhi: Motilal Banarsidass. ISBN 9788120833340. Archived from the original on 2015-07-09.
- Williams, Paul (2008), Mahayana Buddhism: The Doctrinal Foundations, Routledge
- Xing, Guang (2005), The Concept of the Buddha, RoutledgeCurzon
