= Nikō =

Buddhist disciple of Nichiren

Minbu Nikō
- 民部日向
- Title: 阿闍梨 (Acharya)

Personal life
- Born: 1253
- Died: 1314 (aged 60–61)

Religious life
- Religion: Buddhism
- Temple: Kuon-ji
- School: Nichiren Buddhism
- Sect: Nichiren-shū

Senior posting
- Teacher: Nichiren

Minbu Nikō (民部日向, 1253–1314) was a Buddhist disciple of Nichiren. He took over Kuon-ji after Nichiren's death, and can thus be considered one of the founders of Nichiren-shū. He was also put in charge of Mount Minobu after Nikkō left in 1288.
