= Nitchō =

Japanese Nichiren Buddhist monk

- 日頂
- Title: 阿闍梨 (Acharya)

Personal life
- Born: 1252
- Died: 1317 (aged 64–65)

Religious life
- Religion: Buddhism
- Temple: Ikegami Honmon-ji
- School: Nichiren Buddhism
- Sect: Nichiren Shū later Nichiren Shoshu

Senior posting
- Teacher: Nichiren

Nitchō (日頂, 1252 – April 19, 1317), also known as Niccho or Iyo-bo, was a Buddhist disciple of Nichiren who helped founding Ikegami Honmon-ji and Hongaku-ji.

Nitchō was the stepson of Toki Jonin. In his youth he studied Tendai Buddhism, but joined Nichiren on Jonin's recommendation, and followed him to Sado Island. He helped Nikkō found Honmon-ji.

Nitcho (日頂) is not to be confused with Nitcho (日澄) (1262–1310), who was Toki Jonin's biological son. Nitcho (日澄) became Nikko's disciple in 1300, and became the first chief instructor of Omosu Seminary in the Suruga province.
