= Nisshō =

Japanese Nichiren Buddhist monk

- 日昭
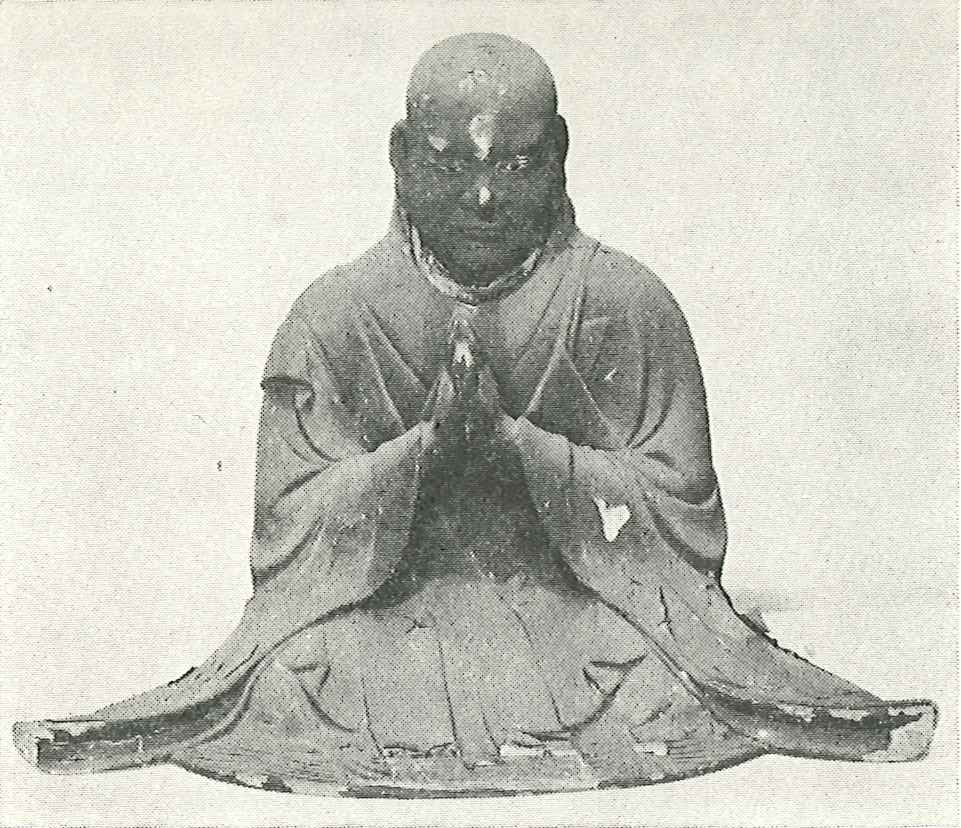
- Hisho Statue, Tamawa Myoho Kageji

Personal life
- Born: c. 1221
- Died: 1323

Religious life
- Religion: Buddhism
- Temple: Myōhokke-ji
- School: Nichiren Buddhism
- Sect: Nichiren-shū; Hama-ha

Senior posting
- Teacher: Nichiren

Nisshō (日昭; c. 1221 – 1323) was a Buddhist disciple of Nichiren and the uncle of Nichirō. He was the only disciple who was actually older than Nichiren himself.

He was a Tendai priest in his youth, and after Nichiren's death he continued to claim that he was merely carrying out a reform of this sect. He founded Myōhokke-ji in 1284. His Hama-ha subsect continued to hold good relations with the Tendai sect.
