= Nichiji =

Japanese Buddhist monk

- 日持

Personal life
- Born: Kaikō; 1250 in Suruga Province
- Died: after 1304 in Xuanhua District

Religious life
- Religion: Buddhism
- Temple: Lìhuà Temple
- School: Nichiren Buddhism

Senior posting
- Teacher: Nichiren

Nichiji (日持; February 10, 1250 – after 1304), also known as Kaikō, was a Buddhist disciple of Nichiren who traveled to today's Hokkaido, Russian Far East, and China.

Nichiji was born in Suruga Province, the second child of an influential family (Note: His father was Matsuno Rokurōzaemon with the common given name, Yukiyasu, and his older brother was Matsuno Rokurōzaemon with the common given name, Yukinari.) that ruled Matsuno village (Note: Today's western inland portion of Fuji City that covers the municipalities of Kitamatsuno (北松野) and Minamimatsuno (南松野).) of the Ihara District. At first, he studied to become a Tendai priest but soon joined Nichiren as one of his initial followers.

Nichiji was one of the "six chosen disciples" of Nichiren, but was also a disciple of Nikkō. After Nichiren died in 1282, Nichiji established Eishō-ji, now Ren'ei-ji (蓮永寺) in Shizuoka. But soon, relations with Nikkō became strained. He set out on a missionary journey on January 1, 1295. His plan was to walk to Hakodate, Hokkaidō and from there proceed to Xanadu in order to convert the Mongols.

For many centuries it was unknown what happened to Nichiji after he left Japan. According to legends, he founded a temple in northern Japan and caught a new fish in Hokkaido that he named hokke, after the Lotus Sutra (法華, hokke); even in legends it was unclear if he ever reached China alive. In 1936, though, a Japanese tourist discovered his gohonzon and relics in a remote region of China, and in 1989 these relics were carbon dated and determined by Kyoto University researchers to be most probably partly authentic. Thanks to his inscriptions on the relics, it is now known that he landed in China in 1298, met some Western Xia Buddhists on the road and decided on their advice to settle in Xuanhua District instead of Xanadu. In Xuanhua, he founded Lihua Temple, (Note: 立化寺; lìhuà-sì in Chinese. Rikka-ji (立化寺) in Japanese.) and some local residents converted to the teachings of Nichiren (Note: It is called Nichiren Buddhism in English or more generally called Hokke-shū (法華宗) in Japanese.) under his tutelage. He died sometime after 1304.

In Nichiren-shū, Nichiji is regarded as a patron saint of foreign missionaries.
