= Kyōnin-ji =

Buddhist temple in Chiba Prefecture, Japan

Coordinates: 35°7′9.4″N 140°6′23.3″E

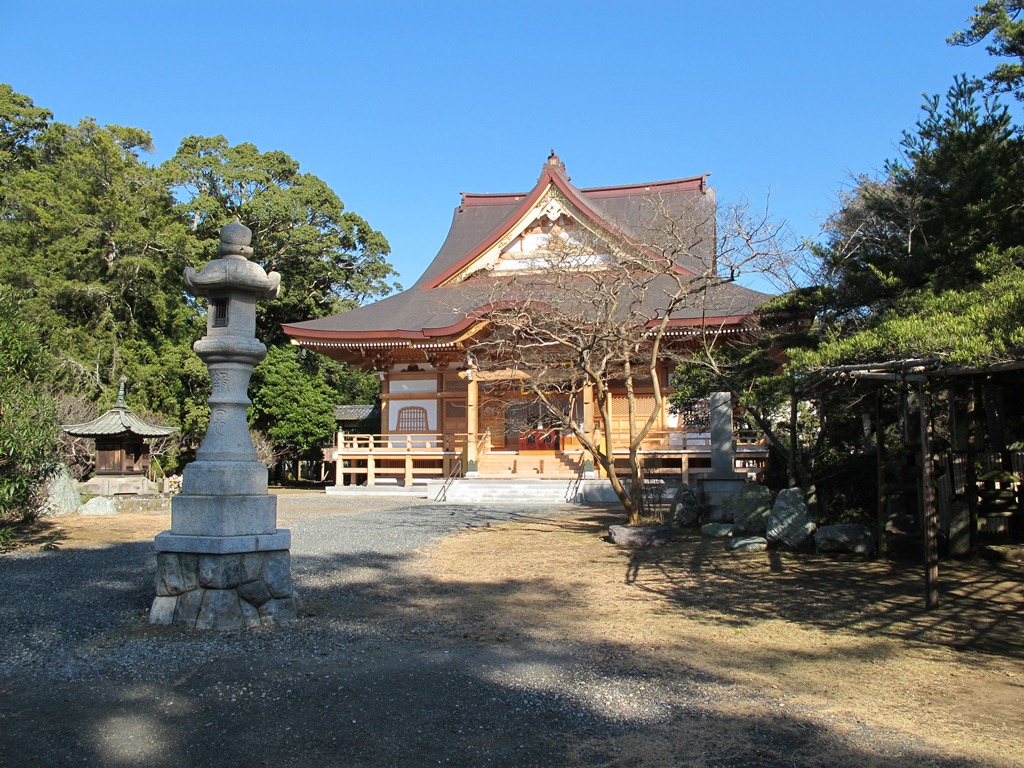
Part of the building complex of Kyōnin-ji

The Kyōnin-ji, situated in Kamogawa, Chiba Prefecture, was founded on 5 March 1281 and is one of the most important historic temples of Nichiren-shū.

On 11 November 1264, following an invite by Kudō Yoshitaka Lord of Amatsu, Nichiren came under attack by Nembutsu adherents while on his way to the Lord's residence. Kyōninbō Nichigyō and Kudō Yoshitaka who rushed to his aid were killed in the event while two other of Nichiren's companions were injured. Legend has it that Nichiren's prayer beads protected him from serious injuries. In remembrance of those events Nichiryū, son of the killed Kudō Yoshitaka and a disciple of Nichiren, founded the temple in 1281.

Next to buildings like the Soshidō (founders hall) and the Hondō (great hall) an 800-year-old cedar tree are regarded as the temple's main landmarks. According to legend the goddess Kishimojin appeared to Nichiren in the old cedar tree.
