= Three Great Secret Laws =

Fundamental teachings in Nichiren Buddhism

Three Great Secret Laws (三大秘法) (or also "Three Great Secret Dharmas") are the fundamental teachings in Nichiren Buddhism, which include Hommon-no-honzon (本門の本尊: object of devotion of the essential teaching), Hommon-no-kaidan (本門の戒壇: sanctuary of the essential teaching), and Hommon-no-daimoku (本門の題目: daimoku of the essential teaching).

The interpretations of each item are different in each school of Nichiren's teachings, such as Nichiren Shu sects, Nichiren Shoshu sects, Soka Gakkai branches.

	Nichiren Shu	Nichiren Shoshu	Soka Gakkai
Honzon	・The Essential Focus of Reverence (Gohonzon) ・ Shakyamuni Buddha is none other than the embodiment of the Eternal Buddha.	・ The Dai-Gohonzon, inscribed by Nichiren Daishonin on October 12, 1279.	・In terms of the Personification: Nichiren representing the Buddha of the Latter Day of the Law. ・In terms of the Law: Nichiren's mandala
Kaidan	・Any place where one chants the Odaimoku.	・The place where the Dai-Gohonzon will be enshrined at the time of kosen-rufu.	The place where one enshrines the object of devotion and chants Nam Myōhō Renge Kyō.
Daimoku	・Nam Myōhō Renge Kyō (Embodies the essence of the Lotus Sutra, it contains all of the qualities of Buddhahood)	・Nam Myōhō Renge Kyō (The true invocation carries the significance of both faith and practice)	・Nam Myōhō Renge Kyō with belief in the Gohonzon of the essential teaching

(The table is summarized from the texts by each sect.)
