= Nichiren Buddhism =

Japanese branch of Buddhism

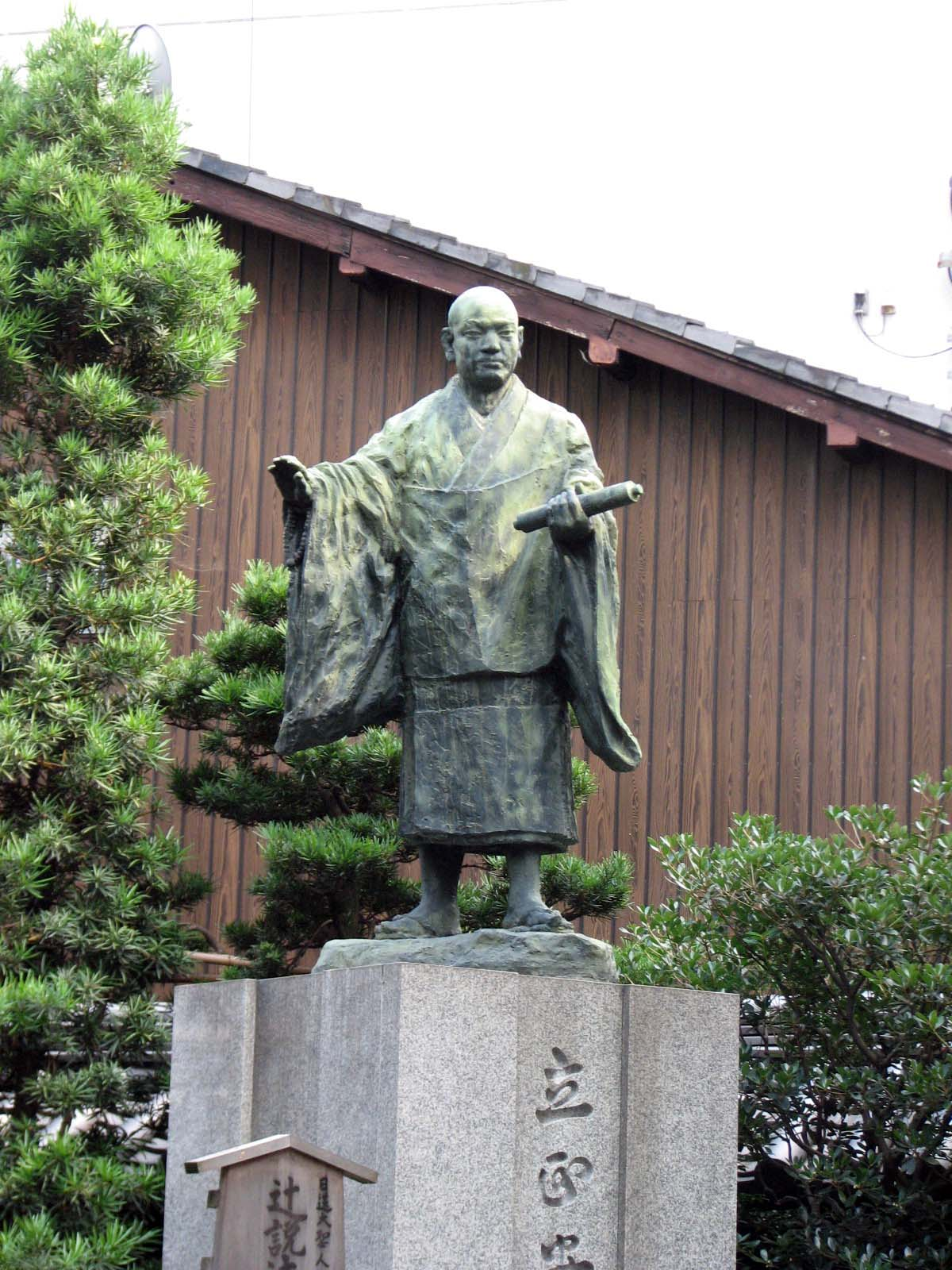
A bronze garden statue of Nichiren Daishonin in the Honnoji Temple of Nichiren Shu in Teramachi Street, Kyoto, Japan

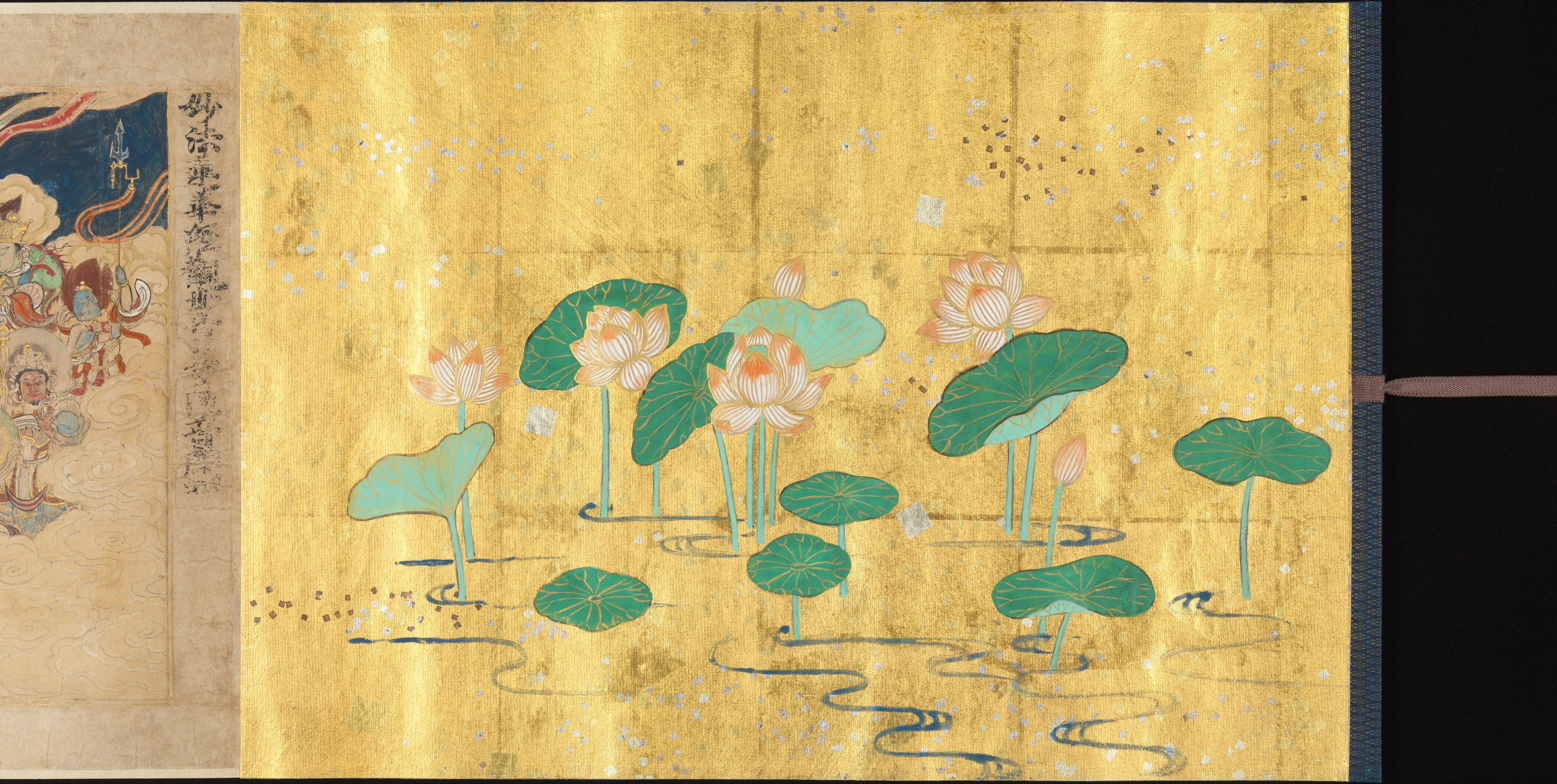
An illustrated image of the Lotus Sūtra, which is highly revered in Nichiren Buddhism. From the Kamakura period, c. 1257. Ink, color, and gold leaf on paper.

Nichiren Buddhism (Japanese: 日蓮仏教, romanized: Nichiren bukkyō), also known as Hokkeshū (Japanese: 法華宗, meaning Lotus Sect), is a branch of Mahayana Buddhism based on the teachings of the 13th-century Japanese Buddhist priest Nichiren (1222–1282) and is one of the Kamakura period schools. Its teachings derive from some 300–400 extant letters and treatises either authored by or attributed to Nichiren.

Nichiren Buddhism generally sources its basic doctrine from the Lotus Sutra claiming that all sentient beings possess an internal Buddha-nature capable of attaining Buddhahood in the current life. There are three essential aspects to Nichiren Buddhism:

1. The faith in Nichiren's Gohonzon
2. The chanting of Nam Myoho Renge Kyo with varying recitations of the Lotus Sutra
3. The study of Nichiren's scriptural writings, called Gosho

After his death, Nichiren entrusted both his senior disciples and lay followers with the mandate to widely propagate the Gohonzon and chanting of the Daimoku in order to secure the peace and prosperity of society.

Traditionalist Nichiren Buddhist temple groups are commonly associated with Nichiren Shōshū and various Nichiren-shū schools. In addition, modern lay organizations not affiliated with temples such as Soka Gakkai, Kenshokai, Shoshinkai, Risshō Kōsei Kai, and Honmon Butsuryū-shū also exist while some Japanese new religions are Nichiren-inspired lay groups.

The Soka Gakkai International is often called "the most prominent Japanese 'export' religion to draw significant numbers of non-Japanese converts", by which Nichiren Buddhism has spread throughout the world.

Nichiren upheld the belief that the Lotus Sutra alone contains the highest degree of Buddhist teachings and proposed a classification system that ranks the quality of religions and various Nichiren schools can be either accommodating or vigorously opposed to any other forms of Buddhism or religious beliefs. Various followers debate Nichiren status, as a Bodhisattva, a mortal saint, or an "Original Buddha" of the third age of Buddhism. Nichiren Buddhism is practiced in many countries. The largest groups are Soka Gakkai International, Nichiren Shu, and Nichiren Shōshū.

== Basic teachings ==
The basic practice of Nichiren Buddhism is chanting the invocation Namu Myōhō Renge Kyō to an object called the Gohonzon. Embracing Namu Myōhō Renge Kyō entails both chanting and having the mind of faith (Shinjin). It has three pillars namely: faith, practice, and study. Both the invocation and the Gohonzon, as taught by Nichiren, embody the title and essence of the Lotus Sutra, which he taught as the only valid scripture for the Latter Day of the Law, as well as the life state of Buddhahood inherent in all life.

Nichiren considered that in the Latter Day of the Law – a time of human strife and confusion, when Buddhism would be in decline – Buddhism had to be more than the theoretical or meditative practice it had become, but was meant to be practiced "with the body", that is, in one's actions and the consequent results that are manifested. More important than the formality of ritual, he claimed, was the substance of the practitioner's life in which the spiritual and material aspects are interrelated. He considered conditions in the world to be a reflection of the conditions of the inner lives of people; the premise of his first major remonstrance, Rissho Ankoku Ron (Establishing The Correct Teaching for the Peace of The Land), is that if a nation abandons heretical forms of Buddhism and adopts faith in the Lotus Sutra, the nation will know peace and security. He considered his disciples the "Bodhisattvas of the Earth" who appeared in the Lotus Sutra with the vow to spread the correct teaching and thereby establish a peaceful and just society. For Nichiren, enlightenment is not limited to one's inner life, but is "something that called for actualization in endeavors toward the transformation of the land, toward the realization of an ideal society."

The specific task to be pursued by Nichiren's disciples was the widespread propagation of his teachings (the invocation and the Gohonzon) in a way that would effect actual change in the world's societies so that the sanctuary, or seat, of Buddhism could be built. Nichiren saw this sanctuary as a specific seat of his Buddhism, but there is thought that he also meant it in a more general sense, that is, wherever his Buddhism would be practiced. This sanctuary, along with the invocation and Gohonzon, comprise "the three great secret laws (or dharmas)" found in the Lotus Sutra.

== Nichiren ==
=== Nichiren and his time ===
Nichiren Buddhism originated in 13th-century feudal Japan. It is one of six new forms of Shin Bukkyo (English: "New Buddhism") of "Kamakura Buddhism." The arrival of these new schools was a response to the social and political upheaval in Japan during this time as power passed from the nobility to a shogunate military dictatorship led by the Minamoto clan and later to the Hōjō clan. A prevailing pessimism existed associated with the perceived arrival of the Age of the Latter Day of the Law. The era was marked by an intertwining relationship between Buddhist schools and the state which included clerical corruption.

By Nichiren's time the Lotus Sūtra was firmly established in Japan. From the ninth century, Japanese rulers decreed that the Lotus Sūtra be recited in temples for its "nation-saving" qualities. It was the most frequently read and recited sutra by the literate lay class and its message was disseminated widely through art, folk tales, music, and theater. It was commonly held that it had powers to bestow spiritual and worldly benefits to individuals. However, even Mount Hiei, the seat of Tiantai Lotus Sutra devotion, had come to adopt an eclectic assortment of esoteric rituals and Pure Land practices as "expedient means" to understand the sutra itself.

=== Development during Nichiren's life ===
Nichiren developed his thinking in this midst of confusing Lotus Sutra practices and a competing array of other "Old Buddhism" and "New Buddhism" schools. The biographical development of his thinking is sourced almost entirely from his extant writings as there is no documentation about him in the public records of his times. Modern scholarship on Nichiren's life tries to provide sophisticated textual and sociohistorical analyses to cull longstanding myths about Nichiren that accrued over time from what is actually concretized.

It is clear that from an early point in his studies Nichiren came to focus on the Lotus Sutra as the culmination and central message of Shakyamuni. As his life unfolded he engaged in a "circular hermeneutic" in which the interplay of the Lotus Sutra text and his personal experiences verified and enriched each other in his mind. As a result, there are significant turning points as his teachings reach full maturity. Scholar Yoshirō Tamura categorizes the development of Nichiren's thinking into three periods:

- An early period extending up to Nichiren's submission of the "Risshō Ankoku Ron" ("Establishment of the Legitimate Teaching for the Protection of the Country") to Hōjō Tokiyori in 1260;
- A middle period bookmarked by his first exile (to Izu Peninsula, 1261) and his release from his second exile (to Sado Island, 1273);
- A final period (1274–1282) in which Nichiren lived in Mount Minobu directing his movement from afar.

==== Early stage: From initial studies to 1260 ====
For more than 20 years Nichiren examined Buddhist texts and commentaries at Mount Hiei's Enryaku-ji temple and other major centers of Buddhist study in Japan. In later writings he claimed he was motivated by four primary questions: (1) What were the essentials of the competing Buddhist sects so they could be ranked according to their merits and flaws? (2) Which of the many Buddhist scriptures that had reached Japan represented the essence of Shakyamuni's teaching? (3) How could he be assured of the certainty of his own enlightenment? (4) Why was the Imperial House defeated by the Kamakura regime in 1221 despite the prayers and rituals of Tendai and Shingon priests? He eventually concluded that the highest teachings of Shakyamuni Buddha (c. 563 – c. 483 BC) were to be found in the Lotus Sutra. Throughout his career Nichiren carried his personal copy of the Lotus Sutra which he continually annotated. The mantra he expounded on 28 April 1253, known as the Daimoku or Odaimoku, Namu Myōhō Renge Kyō, expresses his devotion to the Lotus Sutra.

From this early stage of his career, Nichiren started to engage in fierce polemics criticizing the teachings of Buddhism taught by the other sects of his day, a practice that continued and expanded throughout his life. Although Nichiren accepted the Tendai theoretical constructs of "original enlightenment" (hongaku shisō) and "attaining Buddhahood in one's present form" (sokushin jobutsu) he drew a distinction, insisting both concepts should be seen as practical and realizable amidst the concrete realities of daily life. He took issue with other Buddhist schools of his time that stressed transcendence over immanence. Nichiren's emphasis on "self-power" (Jpn. ji-riki) led him to harshly criticize Hōnen and his Pure Land Buddhism school because of its exclusive reliance on Amida Buddha "other-power" (Jpn. ta-riki) for salvation. In addition to his critique of Pure Land Buddhism, he later expanded his polemics to criticisms of the Zen, Shingon, and Ritsu sects. These four critiques were later collectively referred to as his "four dictums." Later in his writings, Nichiren referred to his early exegeses of the Pure Land teachings as just the starting point for his polemics against the esoteric teachings, which he had deemed as a far more significant matter of concern. Adding to his criticisms of esoteric Shingon, Nichiren wrote detailed condemnations about the Tendai school which had abandoned its Lotus Sutra-exclusiveness and incorporated esoteric doctrines and rituals as well as faith in the soteriological power of Amida Buddha.

The target of his tactics expanded during the early part of his career. Between 1253 and 1259 he proselytized and converted individuals, mainly attracting mid- to lower-ranking samurai and local landholders and debated resident priests in Pure Land temples. In 1260, however, he attempted to directly reform society as a whole by submitting a treatise entitled "Risshō Ankoku Ron" ("Establishment of the Legitimate Teaching for the Protection of the Country") to Hōjō Tokiyori, the de facto leader of the nation.

In it he cites passages from the Ninnō, Yakushi, Daijuku, and Konkōmyō sutras. Drawing on Tendai thinking about the non-duality of person and land, Nichiren argued that the truth and efficacy of the people's religious practice will be expressed in the outer conditions of their land and society. He thereby associated the natural disasters of his age with the nation's attachment to inferior teachings, predicted foreign invasion and internal rebellion, and called for the return to legitimate dharma to protect the country. Although the role of Buddhism in "nation-protection" (chingo kokka) was well-established in Japan at this time, in this thesis Nichiren explicitly held the leadership of the country directly responsible for the safety of the land.

==== Middle stage: 1261–1273 ====
During the middle stage of his career, in refuting other religious schools publicly and vociferously, Nichiren provoked the ire of the country's rulers and of the priests of the sects he criticized. As a result, he was subjected to persecution which included two assassination attempts, an attempted beheading and two exiles. His first exile, to Izu Peninsula (1261–1263), convinced Nichiren that he was "bodily reading the Lotus Sutra (Jpn. Hokke shikidoku)", fulfilling the predictions on the 13th chapter (Fortitude) that votaries would be persecuted by ignorant lay people, influential priests, and their friends in high places.

Nichiren began to argue that through "bodily reading the Lotus Sutra," rather than just studying its text for literal meaning, a country and its people could be protected. According to Habito, Nichiren argued that bodily reading the Lotus Sutra entails four aspects:

The awareness of Śākyamuni Buddha's living presence. "Bodily reading the Lotus Sutra" is equivalent to entering the very presence of the Buddha in an immediate, experiential, and face-to-face way, he claimed. Here Nichiren is referring to the Primordial Buddha revealed in Chapter 16 ("Life Span of the Thus Come One") who eternally appears and engages in human events in order to save living beings from their state of unhappiness.
One contains all. Nichiren further developed the Tiantai doctrine of "three thousand realms in a single thought-moment". Every thought, word, or deed contains within itself the whole of the three thousand realms; reading even one word of the sūtra therefore includes the teachings and merits of all buddhas. Chanting Namu Myōhō Renge Kyō, according to Nichiren, is the concrete means by which the principle of the three thousand realms in a single thought-moment is activated and assures the attainment of enlightenment as well as receiving various kinds of worldly benefit.
The here and now. Nichiren held that the bodily reading of the sūtra must be applicable to time, place, and contemporary events. Nichiren was acutely aware of the social and political turmoil of his country and spiritual confusion of people in the Latter Day of the Law.
Utmost seriousness. True practitioners must go beyond mental or verbal practices and actively speak up against and oppose prevailing thoughts and philosophies that denigrate the message of the Lotus Sutra. Nichiren set the example and was willing to lay down his life for its propagation and realization.

His three-year exile to Sado Island proved to be another key turning point in Nichiren's life. Here he began inscribing the Gohonzon and wrote several major theses in which he claimed that he was Bodhisattva Superior Practices, the leader of the Bodhisattvas of the Earth.

He concludes his work The Opening of the Eyes with the declaration "I will be the pillar of Japan; I will be the eyes of Japan; I will be the vessel of Japan. Inviolable shall remain these vows!" His thinking now went beyond theories of karmic retribution or guarantees of the Lotus Sutra as a protective force. Rather, he expressed a resolve to fulfill his mission despite the consequences. All of his disciples, he asserted, should emulate his spirit and work just like him in helping all people open their innate Buddha lives even though this means encountering enormous challenges.

==== Final stage: 1274–1282 ====
Nichiren's teachings reached their full maturity between the years 1274 and 1282 while he resided in primitive settings at Mount Minobu located in today's Yamanashi Prefecture. During this time he devoted himself to training disciples, produced most of the Gohonzon which he sent to followers, and authored works constituting half of his extant writings including six treatises that were categorized by his follower Nikkō as among his ten most important.

In 1278 the "Atsuhara Affair" ("Atsuhara Persecution") occurred, culminating three years later. In the prior stage of his career, between 1261 and 1273, Nichiren endured and overcame numerous trials that were directed at him personally including assassination attempts, an attempted execution, and two exiles, thereby "bodily reading the Lotus Sutra" (shikidoku 色読). In so doing, according to him, he validated the 13th ("Fortitude") chapter of the Lotus Sutra in which a host of bodhisattvas promise to face numerous trials that follow in the wake of upholding and spreading the sutra in the evil age following the death of the Buddha: slander and abuse; attack by swords and staves; enmity from kings, ministers, and respected monks; and repeated banishment.

On two occasions, however, the persecution was aimed at his followers. First, in 1271, in conjunction with the arrest and attempted execution of Nichiren and his subsequent exile to Sado, many of his disciples were arrested, banished, or had lands confiscated by the government. At that time, Nichiren stated, most recanted their faith in order to escape the government's actions. In contrast, during the Atsuhara episode twenty lay peasant-farmer followers were arrested on questionable charges and tortured; three were ultimately executed. This time none recanted their faith. Some of his prominent followers in other parts of the country were also being persecuted but maintained their faith as well.

Although Nichiren was situated in Minobu, far from the scene of the persecution, the Fuji district of present-day Shizuoka Prefecture, Nichiren held his community together in the face of significant oppression through a sophisticated display of legal and rhetorical responses. He also drew on a wide array of support from the network of leading monks and lay disciples he had raised, some of whom were also experiencing persecution at the hands of the government.

Throughout the events he wrote many letters to his disciples in which he gave context to the unfolding events by asserting that severe trials have deep significance. According to Stone, "By standing firm under interrogation, the Atsuhara peasants had proved their faith in Nichiren's eyes, graduating in his estimation from 'ignorant people' to devotees meriting equally with himself the name of 'practitioners of the Lotus Sutra.'" During this time Nichiren inscribed 114 mandalas that are extant today, 49 of which have been identified as being inscribed for individual lay followers and which may have served to deepen the bond between teacher and disciple. In addition, a few very large mandalas were inscribed, apparently intended for use at gathering places, suggesting the existence of some type of conventicle structure.

The Atsuhara Affair also gave Nichiren the opportunity to better define what was to become Nichiren Buddhism. He stressed that meeting great trials was a part of the practice of the Lotus Sutra; the great persecutions of Atsuhara were not results of karmic retribution but were the historical unfolding of the Buddhist Dharma. The vague "single good of the true vehicle" which he advocated in the Risshō ankoku ron now took final form as chanting the Lotus Sutra's daimoku or title which he described as the heart of the "origin teaching" (honmon 本門) of the Lotus Sutra. This, he now claimed, lay hidden in the depths of the 16th ("The Life Span of the Tathāgata") chapter, never before being revealed, but intended by the Buddha solely for the beginning of the Final Dharma Age.

=== Nichiren's writings ===
A prolific writer, Nichiren's personal communiques among his followers as well as numerous treatises detail his view of the correct form of practice for the Latter Day of the Law (mappō); lay out his views on other Buddhist schools, particularly those of influence during his lifetime; and elucidate his interpretations of Buddhist teachings that preceded his. These writings are collectively known as Gosho (御書) or Nichiren ibun (日蓮遺文).

Out of 162 historically identified followers of Nichiren, 47 were women. Many of his writings were to women followers in which he displays strong empathy for their struggles, and continually stressed the Lotus Sutra's teaching that all people, men and women equally, can become enlightened just as they are. His voice is sensitive and kind which differs from the strident picture painted about him by critics.

Which of these writings, including the Ongi Kuden (orally transmitted teachings), are deemed authentic or apocryphal is a matter of debate within the various schools of today's Nichiren Buddhism. His Rissho Ankoku Ron, preserved at Shochuzan Hokekyo-ji, is one of the National Treasures of Japan.

== Post-Nichiren development in Japan ==
=== Development in Medieval Japan ===
After Nichiren's death in 1282 the Kamakura shogunate weakened largely due to financial and political stresses resulting from defending the country from the Mongols. It was replaced by the Ashikaga shogunate (1336–1573), which in turn was succeeded by the Azuchi–Momoyama period (1573–1600), and then the Tokugawa shogunate (1600–1868). During these time periods, collectively comprising Japan's medieval history, Nichiren Buddhism experienced considerable fracturing, growth, turbulence and decline. A prevailing characteristic of the movement in medieval Japan was its lack of understanding of Nichiren's own spiritual realization. Serious commentaries about Nichiren's theology did not appear for almost two hundred years. This contributed to divisive doctrinal confrontations that were often superficial and dogmatic.

This long history of foundings, divisions, and mergers have led to today's 37 legally incorporated Nichiren Buddhist groups. In the modern period, Nichiren Buddhism experienced a revival, largely initiated by lay people and lay movements.

=== Development of the major lineages ===
Several denominations comprise the umbrella term "Nichiren Buddhism" which was known at the time as the Hokkeshū (Lotus School) or Nichirenshū (Nichiren School). The splintering of Nichiren's teachings into different schools began several years after Nichiren's passing. Despite their differences, however, the Nichiren groups shared commonalities: asserting the primacy of the Lotus Sutra, tracing Nichiren as their founder, centering religious practice on chanting Namu Myōhō Renge Kyō, using the Gohonzon in meditative practice, insisting on the need for propagation, and participating in remonstrations with the authorities.

The movement was supported financially by local warlords or stewards (jitõ) who often founded tightly organized clan temples (ujidera) that were frequently led by sons who became priests. Most Nichiren schools point to the founding date of their respective head or main temple (for example, Nichiren Shū the year 1281, Nichiren Shōshū the year 1288, and Kempon Hokke the year 1384) although they did not legally incorporate as religious bodies until the late 19th and early 20th century. A last wave of temple mergers took place in the 1950s.

The roots of this splintering can be traced to the organization of the Nichiren community during his life. In 1282, one year before his death, Nichiren named "six senior priests" (rokurōsō) disciple to lead his community: Nikkō Shōnin (日興), Nisshō (日昭), Nichirō (日朗), Nikō (日向), Nitchō (日頂), and Nichiji (日持). Each had led communities of followers in different parts of the Kanto region of Japan and these groups, after Nichiren's death, ultimately morphed into lineages of schools.

Nikkō Shōnin, Nichirō, and Nisshō were the core of the Minobu (also known as the Nikō or Kuon-ji) monryu or school. Nikō became the second chief abbot of Minobu (Nichiren is considered by this school to be the first). Nichirō's direct lineage was called the Nichirō or Hikigayatsu monryu. Nisshō's lineage became the Nisshō or Hama monryu. Nitchō formed the Nakayama lineage but later returned to become a follower of Nikkō. Nichiji, originally another follower of Nikkō, eventually traveled to the Asian continent (c. 1295) on a missionary journey and some scholarship suggests he reached northern China, Manchuria, and possibly Mongolia. Kuon-ji in Mount Minobu eventually became the head temple of today's Nichiren Shū, the largest branch among traditional schools, encompassing the schools and temples tracing their origins to Nikō, Nichirō, Nisshō, Nitchō, and Nichiji. The lay and/or new religious movements Reiyūkai, Risshō Kōsei Kai, and Nipponzan-Myōhōji-Daisanga stem from this lineage.

Nikkō left Kuon-ji in 1289 and became the founder of what was to be called the Nikkō monryu or lineage. He founded a center at the foot of Mount Fuji which would later be known as the Taiseki-ji temple of Nichiren Shōshū. Soka Gakkai is the largest independent lay organization that shares roots with this lineage.

Fault lines between the various Nichiren groups crystallized over several issues:

Local gods. A deeply embedded and ritualized part of Japanese village life, Nichiren schools clashed over the practice of honoring local gods (kami) by lay disciples of Nichiren. Some argued that this practice was a necessary accommodation. The group led by the monk Nikkō objected to such syncretism.
Content of Lotus Sūtra. Some schools (called Itchi) argued that all chapters of the sūtra should be equally valued and others (called Shōretsu) claimed that the latter half was superior to the former half. (See below for more details.)
Identity of Nichiren. Some of his later disciples identified him with Viśiṣṭacāritra, the leader of the Bodhisattvas of the Earth who were entrusted in Chapter Twenty-Two to propagate the Lotus Sūtra. The Nikkō group identified Nichiren as the original and eternal Buddha.
Identification with Tiantai school. The Nisshō group began to identify itself as a Tiantai school, having no objections to its esoteric practices, perhaps as an expedient means to avoid persecution from Tiantai, Pure Land, and Shingon followers. This deepened the rift with Nikkō.
The Three Gems. All schools of Buddhism speak of the concept of the Three Gems (the Buddha, the Dharma, and the Sangha) but define it differently. Over the centuries the Nichiren schools have come to understand it differently as well. The Minobu school has come to identify the Buddha as Shakyamuni whereas the Nikkō school identifies it as Nichiren. For Minobu the Dharma is Namu Myōhō Renge Kyō, the Nikkō school identifies it as the Namu Myōhō Renge Kyō that is hidden in the 16th "Lifespan" Chapter of the Lotus Sutra (the Gohonzon). Currently, Nichiren Shōshū claims this specifically refers to the Dai Gohonzon, whereas Soka Gakkai holds it represents all Gohonzon. The Sangha, sometimes translated as "the priest", is also interpreted differently. Minobu defines it as Nichiren; Nichiren Shoshu as Nikkō representing its priesthood; and the Soka Gakkai as Nikkō representing the harmonious community of practitioners.

The cleavage between Nichiren groups has also been classified by the so-called Itchi (meaning unity or harmony) and Shoretsu (a contraction of two words meaning superior/inferior) lineages.

- The Itchi lineage today comprises most of the traditional schools within Nichiren Buddhism, of which the Nichiren Shū is the biggest representative, although it also includes some Nikkō temples. In this lineage the whole of the Lotus Sutra, both the so-called theoretical (shakumon or "Imprinted Gate") and essential (honmon or "Original Gate") chapters, are venerated. While great attention is given to the 2nd and 16th chapter of the Lotus Sutra, other parts of the sutra are recited.
- The Shoretsu lineage comprises most temples and lay groups following the Nikkō monryu. The Shoretsu group values the supremacy of the essential over the theoretical part of the Lotus Sutra. Therefore, solely the 2nd and 16th chapters of the Lotus Sutra are recited. There are additional subdivisions in the Shoretsu group which splintered over whether the entire second half was of equal importance, the eight chapters of the second half when the assembly participates in the "Ceremony of the Air," or specifically Chapter Sixteen (Lifespan of the Tathāgata).

==== Origin of the Fuji School ====
Although there were rivalries and unique interpretations among the early Hokkeshũ lineages, none were as deep and distinct as the divide between the Nikkō or Fuji school and the rest of the tradition. Animosity and discord among the six senior disciples started after the second death anniversary of Nichiren's 100th Day Memorial ceremony (23 January 1283) when the rotation system as agreed upon the "Shuso Gosenge Kiroku" (English: Record Document of Founder's Demise) and Rimbo Cho (English: Rotation Wheel System) to clean and maintain Nichiren's grave. By the third anniversary of Nichiren's passing (13 October 1284), these arrangements seemed to have broken down. Nikkō claimed that the other five senior priests no longer returned to Nichiren's tomb in Mount Minobu, citing signs of neglect at the gravesite. He took up residency and overall responsibility for Kuon-ji temple while Nikō served as its doctrinal instructor. Before long tensions grew between the two concerning the behavior of Hakii Nanbu Rokurō Sanenaga, the steward of the Minobu district and the temple's patron.

Nikkō accused Sanenaga of unorthodox practices deemed to be heretical such as crafting a standing statue of Shakyamuni Buddha as an object of worship, providing funding for the construction of a Pure Land stupa in Fuji, and visiting and worshiping at the Mishima Taisha Shinto shrine which was an honorary shrine of the Hōjō clan shogunate. Nikkō regarded the latter as a violation of Nichiren's Rissho Ankoku Ron.

In addition, Nikkō made accusatory charges that after Nichiren's death, other disciples slowly began to gradually deviate from what Nikkō viewed as Nichiren's orthodox teachings. Chief among these complaints was the syncretic practices of some of the disciples to worship images of Shakyamuni Buddha. Nikkō admonished other disciple priests for signing their names "Tendai Shamon" (of the Tendai Buddhist school) in documents they sent to the Kamakura government. Furthermore, Nikkō alleged that the other disciples disregarded some of Nichiren's writings written in Katakana rather than in Classical Chinese.

Sanenaga defended his actions, claiming that it was customary for his political family to provide monetary donations and make homage to the Shinto shrine of the Kamakura shogunate. Nikō tolerated Sanenaga's acts, claiming that similar incidents occurred previously with the knowledge of Nichiren. Sanenaga sided with Nikō and Nikkō departed in 1289 from Minobu. He returned to his home in Suruga Province and established two temples: Taiseki-ji in the Fuji district and Honmon-ji in Omosu district. He spent most of his life at the latter, where he trained his followers.

According to Stone, it is not absolutely clear that Nikkō intended to completely break from the other senior disciples and start his own school. However, his followers claimed that he was the only one of the six senior disciples who maintained the purity of Nichiren's legacy. Two documents appeared, first mentioned and discovered by Taiseki-ji High Priest Nikkyo Shonin in 1488, claiming Nichiren transferred his teaching exclusively to Nikkō but their authenticity has been questioned. Taiseki-ji does not dispute that the original documents are missing but holds that certified copies are preserved in their repositories. In contrast, other Nichiren sects vehemently claim them as forgeries since they are not in the original handwriting of Nichiren or Nikkō, holding they were copied down by Nikkō's disciples after his death."

In addition to using the letters to defend its claim to orthodoxy, the documents may have served to justify Taiseki-ji's claimed superiority over other Nikkō temples, especially Honmon-ji, the site of Nichiren's tomb. Even though there had been efforts by temples of the Nikkō lineage in the late 19th century to unify into one single separate Nichiren school the Kommon-ha, today's Nichiren Shōshū comprises only the Taiseki-ji temple and its dependent temples. It is not identical to the historical Nikkō or Fuji lineage. Parts of the Kommon-ha, the Honmon-shū, eventually became part of Nichiren Shū in the 1950s. Japanese new religious movements such as the Sōka Gakkai, Shōshinkai, and Kenshōkai trace their origins to the Nichiren Shōshū school and they all eventually branched from it.

==== 15th century through the early 19th century ====
In the early 14th century Hokkeshū followers spread the teachings westward and established congregations (Jpn. shū) into the imperial capital of Kyoto and as far as Bizen and Bitchu. During this time there is documentation of face-to-face public debates between Hokkeshū and Nembutsu adherents. By the end of the century Hokkeshū temples had been founded all over Kyoto, only being outnumbered by Zen temples. The demographic base of support in Kyoto were members of the merchant class (Jpn. machishū), some of whom had acquired great wealth. Tanabe hypothesizes they were drawn to this faith because of Nichiren's emphasis on the "third realm" (Jpn. daisan hōmon) of the Lotus Sutra, staked out in chapters 10–22, which emphasize practice in the mundane world.

In the 15th century, the political and social order began to collapse and Hokkeshū followers armed themselves. The Hokke-ikki was an uprising in 1532 of Hokke followers against the followers of the Pure Land school in 1532. Initially successful it became the most powerful religious group in Kyoto but its fortunes were reversed in 1536 when Mt. Hiei armed forces destroyed twenty-one Hokkeshū temples and killed some 58,000 of its followers. In 1542 permission was granted by the government to rebuild the destroyed temples and the Hokke machishū played a crucial role in rebuilding the commerce, industry, and arts in Kyoto. Their influence in the arts and literature continued through the Momoyama (1568–1615) and Edo (1615–1868) periods and many of the most famous artists and literati were drawn from their ranks.

Although the various sects of Nichiren Buddhism were administratively independent, there is evidence of cooperation between them. For example, in 1466 the major Hokke temples in Kyoto signed the Kanshō-era accord (Kanshō meiyaku) to protect themselves against threats from Mt. Hiei. Despite strong sectarian differences, there is also evidence of interactions between Hokkeshū and Tendai scholar-monks.

During the Edo period, with the consolidation of power by the Tokugawa shogunate, increased pressure was placed on major Buddhist schools and Nichiren temples to conform to governmental policies. Some Hokkeshū adherents, the followers of the so-called Fuju-fuse lineage, adamantly bucked this policy based on their readings of Nichiren's teachings to neither take (fuju) nor give (fuse) offerings from non-believers. Suppressed, adherents often held their meetings clandestinely which led to the Fuju-fuse persecution and numerous executions of believers in 1668. During this time of persecution, most likely to prevent young priests from adopting a passion for propagation, Nichiren seminaries emphasized Tendai studies with only a few top-ranking students permitted to study some of Nichiren's writings.

During the Edo period the majority of Hokkeshū temples were subsumed into the shogunate's Danka system, an imposed nationwide parish system designed to ensure religious peace and root out Christianity. In this system Buddhist temples, in addition to their ceremonial duties, were forced to carry out state administrative functions. Thereby they became agents of the government and were prohibited to engage in any missionary activities. Hokkeshū temples were now obligated, just like those of other Buddhist schools, to focus on funeral and memorial services (Sōshiki bukkyō) as their main activity. Stagnation was often the price for the protected status.

==== 19th century: From Tokugawa to Meiji periods ====
Nichiren Buddhism was deeply influenced by the transition from the Tokugawa (1600–1868) to Meiji (1868–1912) periods in nineteenth-century Japan. The changeover from early modern (kinsei) to modern (kindai) was marked by the transformation of late-feudal institutions into modern ones as well as the political transition from shogunal to imperial rule and the economic shift from national isolation to integration in the world economy. This entailed creating a centralized state, stitching together some 260 feudal domains ruled by hereditary leaders (daimyō), and moving from a caste social system to a meritocracy based on educational achievement. Although commonly perceived as a singular event called the Meiji Restoration, the transition was full of twists and turns that began in the later Tokugawa years and continued decades after the 1867–1868 demise of the shogunate and launch of imperial rule.

By this time Japanese Buddhism was often characterized by syncretism in which local nativistic worship was incorporated into Buddhist practice. For example, Tendai, Shingon, Jodō, and Nichiren temples often had chapels within them dedicated to Inari Shinto worship. Within Nichiren Buddhism there was a phenomenon of Hokke Shintō (Lotus Shinto), closely influenced by Yoshida Shintō.

Anti-Buddhist sentiment had been building throughout the latter part of the Tokugawa period (1603–1868). Scholars such as Tominaga Nakamoto and Hirata Atsutane attacked the theoretical roots of Buddhism. Critics included promoters of Confucianism, nativism, Shinto-inspired Restorationists, and modernizers. Buddhism was critiqued as a needless drain on public resources and also as an insidious foreign influence that had obscured the indigenous Japanese spirit.

Under attack by two policies of the day, shinbutsu bunri (Separation of Shinto Deities and Buddhas) and haibutsu kishaku (Eradication of Buddhism), Japanese Buddhism during the Tokugawa-to-Meiji transition proved to be a crisis of survival. The new government promoted policies that reduced the material resources available to Buddhist temples and downgraded their role in the religious, political, and social life of the nation.

The policies of shibutsu bunri were implemented at the local level throughout Japan but were particularly intense in three domains that were the most active in the Restoration: Satsuma, Choshii, and Tosa. In Satsuma, for example, by 1872 all of its 1000+ Buddhist temples had been abolished, their monks laicized, and their landholdings confiscated. Throughout the country thousands of Buddhist temples and, at a minimum, tens of thousands of Buddhist sutras, paintings, statues, temple bells and other ritual objects were destroyed, stolen, lost, or sold during the early years of the restoration.

Starting in the second decade of the restoration, pushback against these policies came from Western powers interested in providing a safe harbor for Christianity and Buddhist leaders who proposed an alliance of Shinto and Buddhism to resist Christianity. As part of this accommodation, Buddhist priests were forced to promote key teachings of Shinto and provide support for national policies.

Nichiren Buddhism, like the other Buddhist schools, struggled between accommodation and confrontation. The Nichiren scholar Udana-in Nichiki (1800–1859) argued for a policy of co-existence with other schools of Buddhism, Confucianism, Shinto, and European religions. His disciple Arai Nissatsu (1830–1888) forged an alliance of several Nichiren branches and became the first superintendent of the present Nichiren Shū which was incorporated in 1876. Nissatsu was active in Buddhist intersect cooperation to resist the government's hostile policies, adopted the government's "Great Teaching" policy that was Shinto-derived, and promoted intersectarian understanding. In the process, however, he reinterpreted some of Nichiren's important teachings. Among those arguing against accommodation were Nichiren scholar and lay believer Ogawa Taidō (1814–1878) and the cleric Honda Nisshō (1867–1931) of the Kempon Hokke denomination.

After the above events and centuries of splintering based on dogma and institutional histories, the following major Nichiren temple schools, according to Matsunaga, were officially recognized in the Meiji era:

- 1874: Nichiren-shū (formerly Minobu monryū). This school's headquarters was at Kuon-ji temple and held the Itchi perspective that advocated the equal treatment of all sections of the Lotus Sutra. However, it also included five schools that maintained the Shoretsu perspective which emphasized the latter half of the Lotus Sutra: Myōmanji, Happon, Honjōji, Honryūji, and Fuji-ha.
- 1876: The Fuju-fuse-ha was recognized by the government after years of clandestine operation following episodes of persecution. In 1882 a second Fuju-fuse sect was recognized, the Fuju-Fuse Kōmon-ha.
- 1891: The five Shoretsu schools changed their names:

Myōmanji-ha became Kempon Hokke based at Myōmanji, Kyoto
Happon-ha became Honmon Hokkeshū based in Honjōji, Niigata
Honjōji-ha became Hokkeshū based in Honryūji, Kyoto
Honryūji-ha became Honmyō Hokkeshū, also based in Honryūji, Kyoto
Fuji-ha became Honmonshū in Monmonji, Shizuoka

- 1900: The Taiseki-ji temple of Shizuoka broke off from the Honmonshū and became Nichirenshū Fuji-ha. In 1913, this group was renamed Nichiren Shōshū which was popularized by the Soka Gakkai lay organization. Although the latter has a sizeable membership and it is one of the important Japanese new religions (shinshūkyō), it is not included in many treatments of Nichiren lineages.

=== Development in modern Japanese history ===
Nichiren Buddhism went through many reforms in the Meiji Period during a time of persecution, haibutsu kishaku (廃仏毀釈), when the government attempted to eradicate mainstream Japanese Buddhism. As a part of the Meiji Restoration, the interdependent Danka system between the state and Buddhist temples was dismantled which left the latter without its funding. Buddhist institutions had to align themselves to the new nationalistic agenda or perish. Many of these reform efforts were led by lay people.

The trend toward lay centrality was prominent in Nichiren Buddhism as well, predating the Meiji period. Some Nichiren reformers in the Meiji period attempted to inject a nationalistic interpretation of Nichiren's teachings; others called for globalist perspectives. According to Japanese researcher Yoshiro Tamura, the term "Nichirenism" applies broadly to the following three categories:

1. The nationalistic preoccupation with Nichiren that contributed to Japan's militaristic effort before World War II.
2. Socialist activists and writers during the prewar and postwar eras who promoted a vision of an ideal world society inspired by the Lotus Sutra and according to their own views of Nichiren.
3. Organized religious bodies that were inspired by Nichiren's teachings.

==== As a form of nationalism ====
Both Nichiren and his followers have been associated with fervent Japanese nationalism specifically identified as Nichirenism between the Meiji period and the conclusion of World War II. The nationalistic interpretation of Nichiren's teachings were inspired by lay Buddhist movements like Kokuchūkai and resulted in violent historical events such as the May 15 Incident and the League of Blood Incident. Among the key proponents of this interpretation are Chigaku Tanaka who founded the Kokuchūkai (English: Nation's Pillar Society). Tanaka was charismatic and through his writings and lecturers attracted many followers such as Kanji Ishiwara. Nisshō Honda advocated the unification of Japanese Buddhists to support the imperial state. Other nationalist activists who based their ideas on Nichiren were Ikki Kita and Nisshō Inoue.

==== As a form of socialism ====
Nichirenism also includes several intellectuals and activists who reacted against the prewar nationalistic interpretations and argued for an egalitarian and socialist vision of society based on Nichiren's teachings and the Lotus Sutra. These figures ran against the growing tide of Japanese militarism and were subjected to political harassment and persecution. A leading figure in this group was Girō Seno'o who formed the New Buddhist Youth League (Shinkō Bukkyō Seinen Dōmei).

Originally influenced by the ideals of Tanaka and Honda, Giro Seno came to reject nationalism and argued for humanism, socialism, pacifism, and democracy as a new interpretation of Nichiren's beliefs. He was imprisoned for two years under the National Security Act. The same fate was also endured by Tsunesaburō Makiguchi, who refused the religious dictum of Shinto display accepted by Nichiren Shōshū for the Soka Kyoiku Gakkai, his lay organization composed of primarily secretaries and teachers until it grew to become Soka Gakkai after World War II.

==== Within new social and religious movements ====
Several Nichiren-inspired religious movements arose and appealed primarily to this segment of society with a message of alleviating suffering salvation for many poor urban workers. Honmon Butsuryū-shū, an early example of lay-based religious movements of the modern period inspired by Nichiren, was founded several years before the Meiji Restoration. Reiyūkai, Risshō Kōseikai stemming from Nichiren Shū while Kenshōkai and Soka Gakkai once affiliated with Nichiren Shōshū and the Japanese principle Shin (信 ), Gyo (行), Gaku (学) as "Faith, Practices, Study", are more recent examples of lay-inspired movements drawing from Nichiren's teachings and life.

==== In culture and literature ====
Nichiren Buddhism has had a major impact on Japan's literary and cultural life. Japanese literary figure Takayama Chogyū and children's author Kenji Miyazawa praised Nichiren's teachings. A prominent researcher, Masaharu Anesaki, was encouraged to study Nichiren which led to the work Nichiren: The Buddhist Prophet which introduced Nichiren to the West. Non-Buddhist Japanese individuals such as Uchimura Kanzō listed Nichiren as one of five historical figures who best represented Japan, while Tadao Yanaihara described Nichiren as one of the four historical figures he most admired.

== Globalization ==
While various sects and organizations have had a presence in nations outside Japan for over a century, the genuine expansion of Nichiren Buddhism overseas started in 1960 when Soka Gakkai president Daisaku Ikeda initiated his group's worldwide propagation efforts stemming from a few hundred transplanted Japanese to over 3500 families by 1962.

Nichiren Buddhism is now practiced in many countries outside of Japan. In the United States, religious studies scholar Charles S. Prebish coined the typology of "two Buddhisms" to delineate the divide between forms of Buddhism that appealed either primarily to people of the Asian diaspora or to Euro-American converts. Nattier, on the other hand, proposes a three-way typology. "Import" or "elite" Buddhism refers to a class of people who have the time and means to seek Buddhist teachers to appropriate certain Buddhist techniques such as meditation. "Export" or "evangelical" Buddhism refers to groups that actively proselytize for new members in their local organizations. "Baggage" or "ethnic" Buddhism refers to diaspora Buddhists, usually of a single ethnic group, who have relocated more for social and economic advancement than for evangelical purposes. Another taxonomy divides Western Buddhist groups into three different categories: evangelical, church-like, and meditational.

Nichiren Shū has been classified into the church-like category. One of several Japanese Buddhist schools that followed in the wake of Japanese military conquest and colonization, Nichiren Shū opened a temple in Pusan, Korea in 1881. Its fortunes rose and diminished with the political tides but eventually failed. It also established missions in Sakhalin, Manchuria, and Taiwan. A Nichiren Shū mission was established in Hawaii in 1900. By 1920 it established temples at Pahala, Honolulu, Wailuku and Maui. In 1955, it officially started a mission in Brazil. In 1991, it established the Nichiren Buddhist International Center in 1991 and in 2002 built a center in Hayward, California, to help overseas missions. However, Nichiren Shū does not widely propagate in the West.

Some have characterized the Soka Gakkai as evangelical but others claim that it broke out of the "Two Buddhisms" paradigm. It is quite multi-ethnic and it has taken hold among native populations in locations including Korea, Malaysia, Brazil, Europe, parts of Africa, India, and North America. The growth of the Soka Gakkai was sparked by repeated missionary trips beginning in the early 1960s by Daisaku Ikeda, its third president. In 1975 the Soka Gakkai International was launched in Guam. In the United States it has attracted a diverse membership including a significant demographic of African Americans. Since the 1970s, it has created institutions, publications and exhibitions to support its overall theme of "peace, culture, and education." There is academic research on various national organizations affiliated with this movement: the United States, the United Kingdom, Italy, Canada, Brazil, Scotland, Southeast Asia, Germany, and Thailand.

The Risshō Kōseikai focuses on using its teachings to promote a culture of religiosity through inter-religious dialogue. In 1967, it launched the "Faith to All Men Movement" to awaken a globalized religiosity. It has over 2 million members and 300 Dharma centers in 20 countries throughout the world including Frankfurt and Moorslede. It is active in interfaith organizations, including the International Association for Religious Freedom (IARF) and Religions for Peace (WCRP). It has consultative states with the United Nations and since 1983 issues an annual Peace Prize to individuals or organizations worldwide that work for peace and development and promote interreligious cooperation.

The Reiyūkai conducts more typical missionary activities in the West. It has a membership of between five hundred and one thousand members in Europe, concentrated in Italy, Spain, England and France. The approximately 1,500 members of the Nipponzan Myōhōji have built peace pagodas, conducted parades beating the drum while chanting the daimoku, and encouraged themselves and others to create world peace.

Nichiren Shōshū has six temples in the United States led by Japanese priests and supported by lay Asians and non-Asians. There is one temple in Brazil and the residing priest serves as a "circuit rider" to attend to other locations.

== Lists of major schools and organizations ==
The following lists are based on English-language Wikipedia articles and the Japanese Wikipedia article on Nichiren Buddhism.

=== Clerical Nichiren Buddhist schools and their head temples ===
In alphabetical order (Japanese characters preceded by "Ja:" link to articles in the Japanese Wikipedia).

| Romanized English | Japanese |
|---|---|
| Fuju-fuse Nichiren Kōmon Shū | 不受不施日蓮講門宗 本山本覚寺 |
| Hokke Nichiren Shū | 法華日蓮宗 総本山 Ja:宝龍寺 |
| Hokkeshū, Honmon Ryū | 法華宗（本門流）大本山光長寺・鷲山寺・本興寺･本能寺 |
| Hokkeshū, Jinmon Ryū | 法華宗（陣門流）総本山本成寺 |
| Hokkeshū, Shinmon Ryū | 法華宗（真門流）総本山本隆寺 |
| Hompa Nichiren Shū | 本派日蓮宗 総本山宗祖寺 |
| Honke Nichiren Shū (Hyōgo) | 本化日蓮宗（兵庫） 総本山妙見寺 |
| Honke Nichiren Shū (Kyōto) | Ja:本化日蓮宗（京都）本山石塔寺 |
| Honmon Butsuryū Shū | Ja:本門佛立宗 大本山宥清寺 |
| Honmon Hokke Shū: Daihonzan Myōren-ji | 本門法華宗 大本山妙蓮寺 |
| Honmon Kyōō Shū | Ja:本門経王宗 本山日宏寺 |
| Kempon Hokke Shu: Sōhonzan Myōman-ji | 総本山妙満寺 |
| Nichiren Hokke Shū | Ja:日蓮法華宗 大本山正福寺 |
| Nichiren Honshū: Honzan Yōbō-ji | Ja:日蓮本宗 本山 Ja:要法寺 |
| Nichiren Kōmon Shū | 日蓮講門宗 |
| Nichiren Shōshū: Sōhonzan Taiseki-ji | 日蓮正宗 総本山 大石寺 |
| Nichiren Shū Fuju-fuse-ha: Sozan Myōkaku-ji | 日蓮宗不受不施派 祖山妙覚寺 |
| Nichiren Shū: Sozan Minobuzan Kuon-ji | 日蓮宗 祖山身延山 Ja:久遠寺 |
| Nichirenshū Fuju-fuse-ha | 日蓮宗不受不施派 |
| Shōbō Hokke Shū | 正法法華宗 本山 Ja:大教寺 |

=== 20th-century movements and lay organizations ===
In alphabetical order (Japanese characters preceded by "Ja:" link to articles in the Japanese Wikipedia):

- Bussho Gonenkai Kyōdan, founded in 1950 by Kaichi Sekiguchi and Tomino Sekiguchi.
- Fuji Taisekiji Kenshōkai (also, just Kenshōkai) Ja:富士大石寺顕正会, founded in 1942 and expelled from Nichiren Shōshū in 1974.
- Hokkekō, lay organization affiliated with Nichiren Shōshū.
- Kokuchūkai Ja:国柱会 (also 國柱会), a nationalist group founded in 1914 by Tanaka Chigaku.
- Myōchikai Kyōdan, founded in 1950 by Miyamoto Mitsu.
- Myōdōkai Kyōdan, founded in 1951.
- Nipponzan-Myōhōji-Daisanga, founded in 1917 by Nichidatsu Fujii.
- Reiyūkai (Spiritual-Friendship-Association), founded in 1920 by Kakutaro Kubo and Kimi Kotani, Reiyūkai considers itself the grandfather of lay-based new religions devoted to the Lotus Sutra and ancestor veneration.
- Risshō Kōsei Kai, founded in 1938 by Nikkyō Niwano and Myōkō Naganuma.
- Shōshinkai, founded in 1980.
- Soka Gakkai, founded in Japan in 1930 by Tsunesaburō Makiguchi and Soka Gakkai International founded in 1975 by Daisaku Ikeda.

== See also ==
- Kotodama
- Beophwagye, sects of new Buddhist movement in South Korea that focuses on the Lotus Sutra
