= Kuon-ji =

Buddhist temple in Yamanashi Prefecture, Japan

Kuon-ji 久遠寺
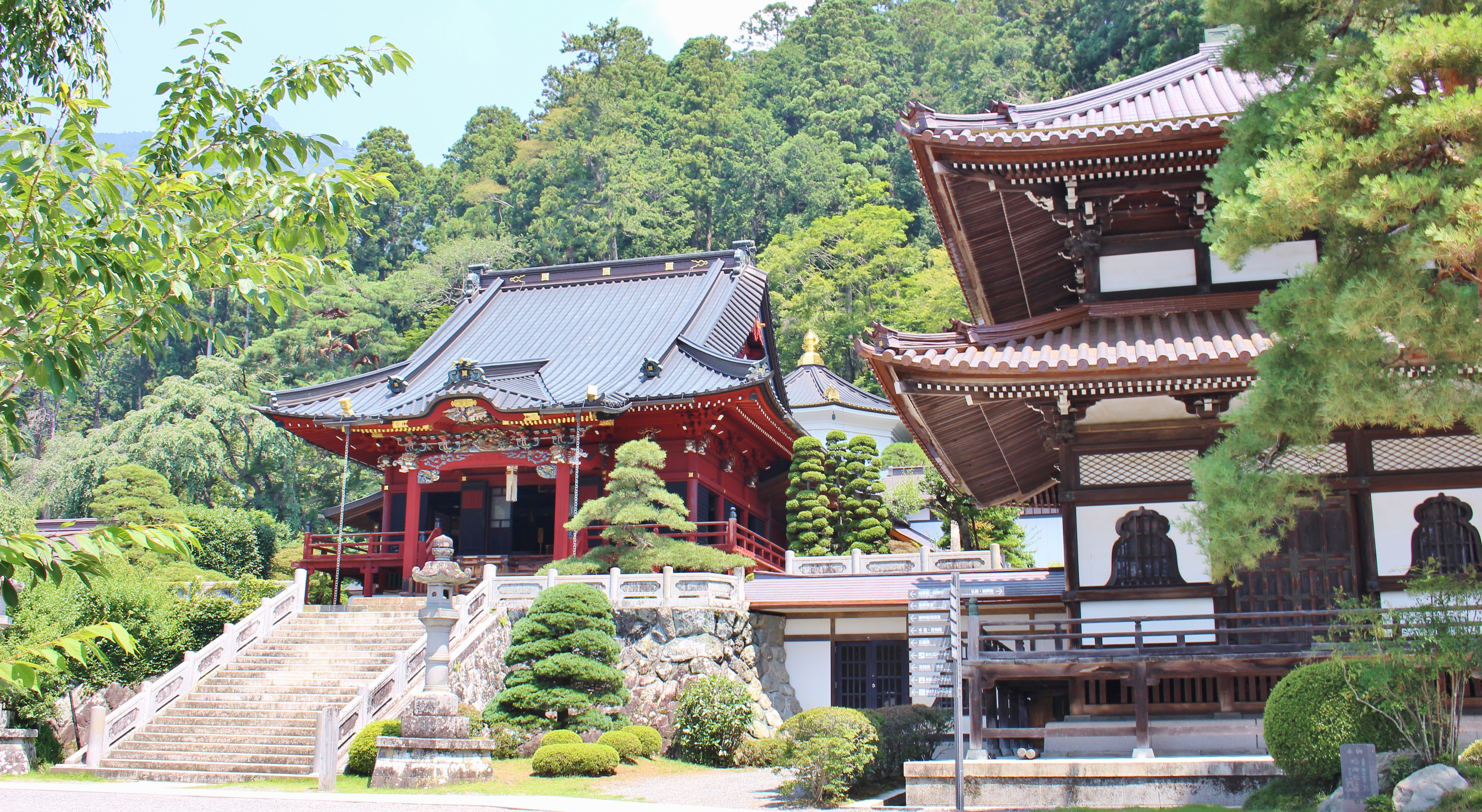
- Panorama of Kuon-ji

- Location within Yamanashi Prefecture Location within Japan

Religion
- Affiliation: Buddhism
- Deity: Sampōzon
- Rite: Nichiren sect

Location
- Location: 3567, Minobu, Minobu-cho, Minamikoma-gun, Yamanashi-ken 409-2593
- Country: Japan
- Interactive map of Kuon-ji 久遠寺
- Coordinates: 35°22′54.92″N 138°25′29.43″E

Architecture
- Founder: Nichiren
- Completed: Late 19th century (Reconstruction)

Website
- Official website

Kuon-ji (久遠寺) is a major Buddhist temple in Yamanashi Prefecture, Japan. Founded by Nichiren in 1281 it is today the head temple of Nichiren Shū. While the Ikegami Honmon-ji in Tokyo is also the Nichiren sect's administrative centre, Kuon-ji today plays an important role as a seminary. Locally it is referred to as the Minobu-san Temple, after the mountain upon which it is built.

== History ==
After returning from banishment to the island of Sado, Nichiren returned for a period to Kamakura, the seat of the Kamakura shogunate which ruled Japan at the time. He was invited by the magistrate Nambu Sanenaga, one of his converts, to relocate to Kai province, where the Nanbu clan had its ancestral estates, in 1274. Soon after his arrival Nichiren set up a hermitage that became a centre of learning for his disciples and adherents. The original dwelling became too small and in 1281 Nichiren founded a temple nearby, which he named Minobu-san Hokke-in Kuon-ji. More than half of the extant letters of Nichiren were written during his years at Minobu. Some consisted of moving letters to followers expressing appreciation for their assistance, counseling on personal matters, and explaining his teachings in more understandable terms. Two of his works from this period, the Senji Shō (撰時抄: "The Selection of the Time") and the Hōon Shō (報恩抄: "On Repaying Debts of Gratitude") constitute, along with his Risshō Ankoku Ron (立正安国論: "On Establishing the Correct Teaching for the Peace of the Land"), Kaimoku Shō ("The Opening of the Eyes"), and Kanjin no Honzon Shō ("The Object of Devotion for Observing the Mind"), what is commonly regarded as his five major writings.

In 1282, Nichiren fell ill and his followers encouraged him to travel to a hot spring. En route, he stopped at the home of a disciple in Ikegami, outside of present-day Tokyo, and died in 1282. Following Nichiren's wishes his ashes were brought to the temple and are enshrined in a mausoleum on the temple grounds.

The temple grew in popularity as a place of pilgrimage through the Sengoku and Edo periods, and in 1712 boasted of 133 chapels within its extensive grounds. However, many of the temple's buildings were destroyed in fires which occurred in 1744, 1776, 1821, 1824, 1829, 1865, and 1875. The present-day temple remains a very large establishment. Over 1.5 million people visit the temple annually. It is reached by bus or car and then climbing the 287 steps known locally as "the steps of enlightenment", which are climbed by chanting pilgrims regularly each year. The blossoming of thousands of cherry trees, including the hundred-year-old weeping cherry tree in the garden, also makes this temple a popular tourist destination

== Cultural properties ==
=== National treasure ===
- Summer Mountain (絹本著色夏景山水図, kenpon chakushoku kakei sansui-zu), a hanging scroll painting on silk attributed to Hu Zhifu from Southern Song dynasty, 13th century, 118.5 cm × 52.7 cm (46.7 in × 20.7 in). The painting is current kept by the Tokyo National Museum.

=== Important cultural properties ===
- Honcho Bunsetsu (本朝文粋), a manuscript consisting of 13 of the 14 volumes of a collection of Chinese poems from the Heian period. The text at Kuon-ji is missing the first volume in the set, and was copied in 1276 based on a copy held at Kanazawa Bunko previously owned by Hojo Tokimune. Designated on June 28, 1984
- Song dynasty copy of the Book of Rites in two volumes, discovered in the Kuon-ji library by Tokutomi Sohō, and corresponding to a section missing from the same manuscript in the possession of Kanazawa Bunko. Designated on May 3, 1955.
- Kamakura period hanging scrolls, of the Shaku Hasso (本朝文粋) or eight phases in the life of Buddha. Kuon-ji has three of the original eight scrolls in the series. One more is located at the Nezu Art Museum. Designated on June 21, 1991.

=== Registered tangible cultural properties ===
On May 10, 2018, 19 buildings of Kuon-ji were designated as Registered tangible cultural properties.

== Gallery ==
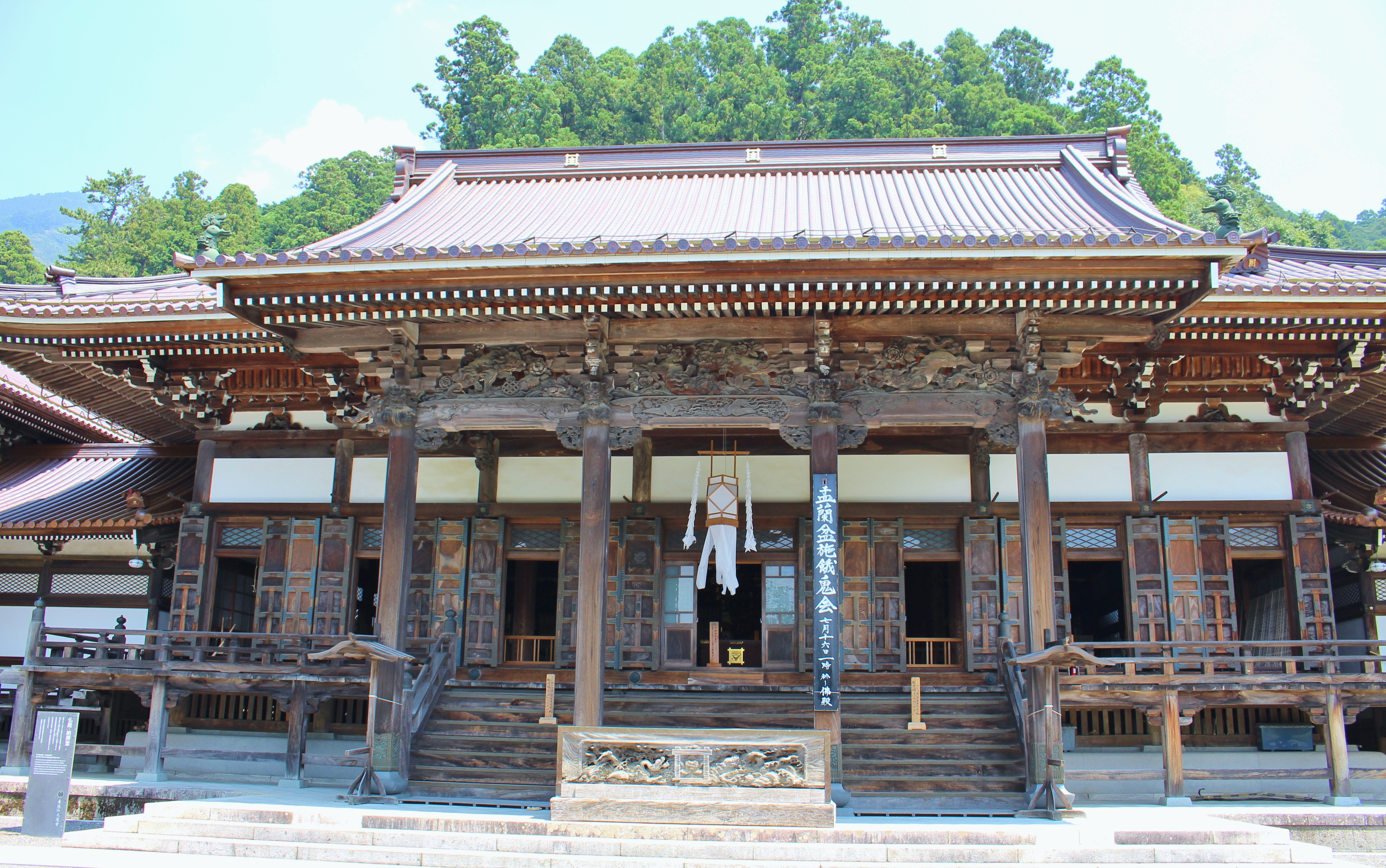
Hondo of Kuon-ji

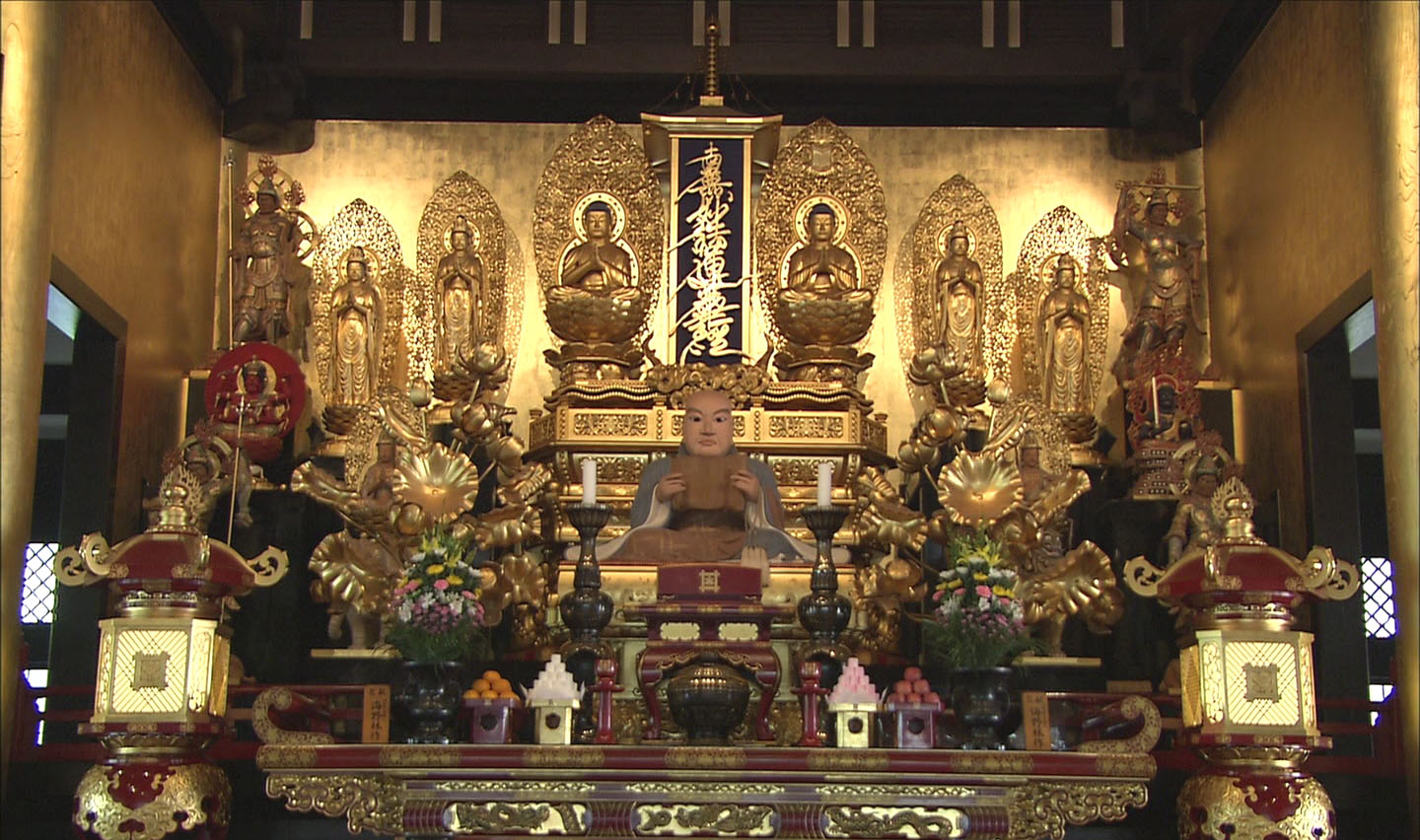
Interior of the Hondo of Kuon-ji

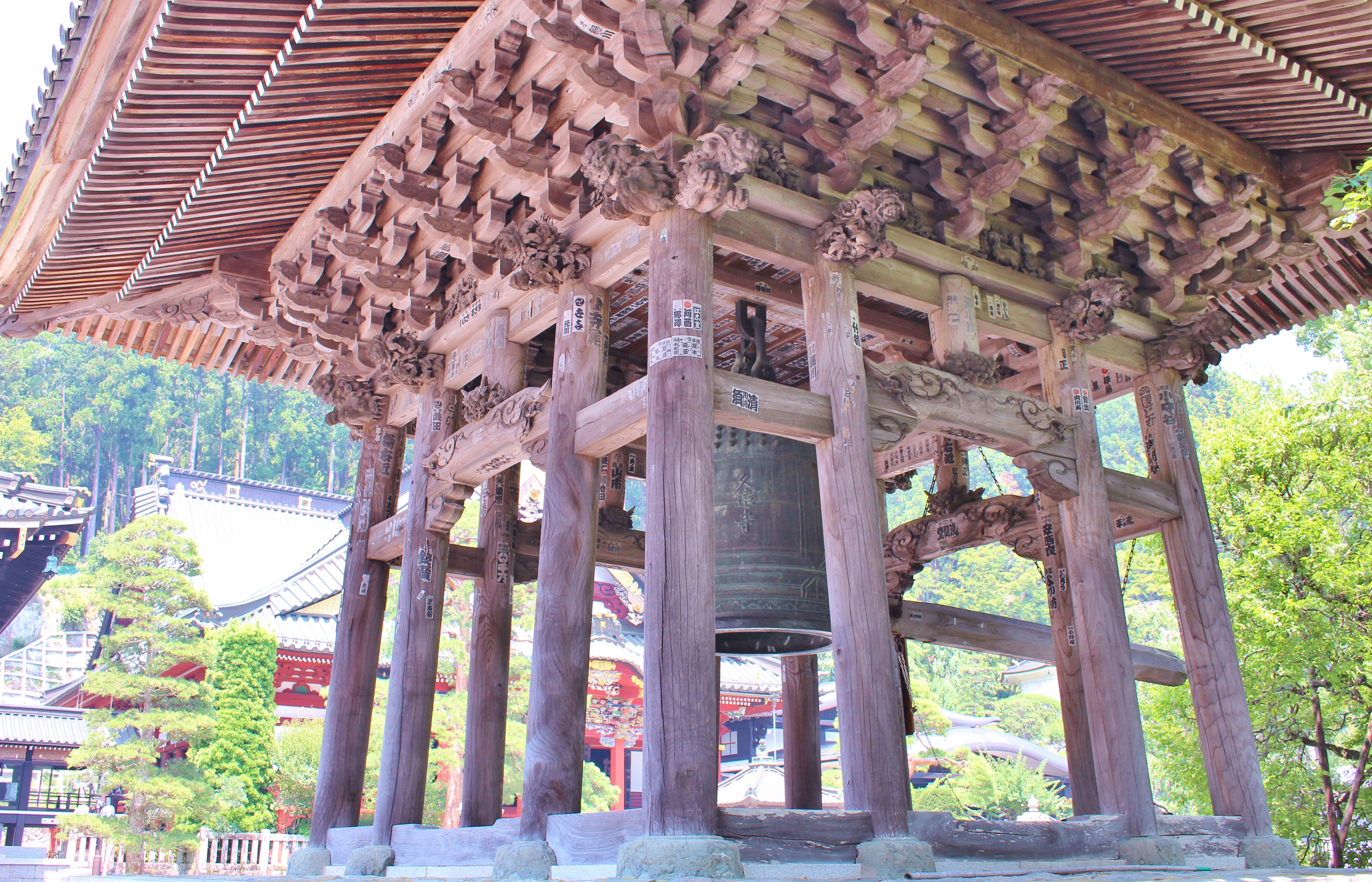
Great Belfry

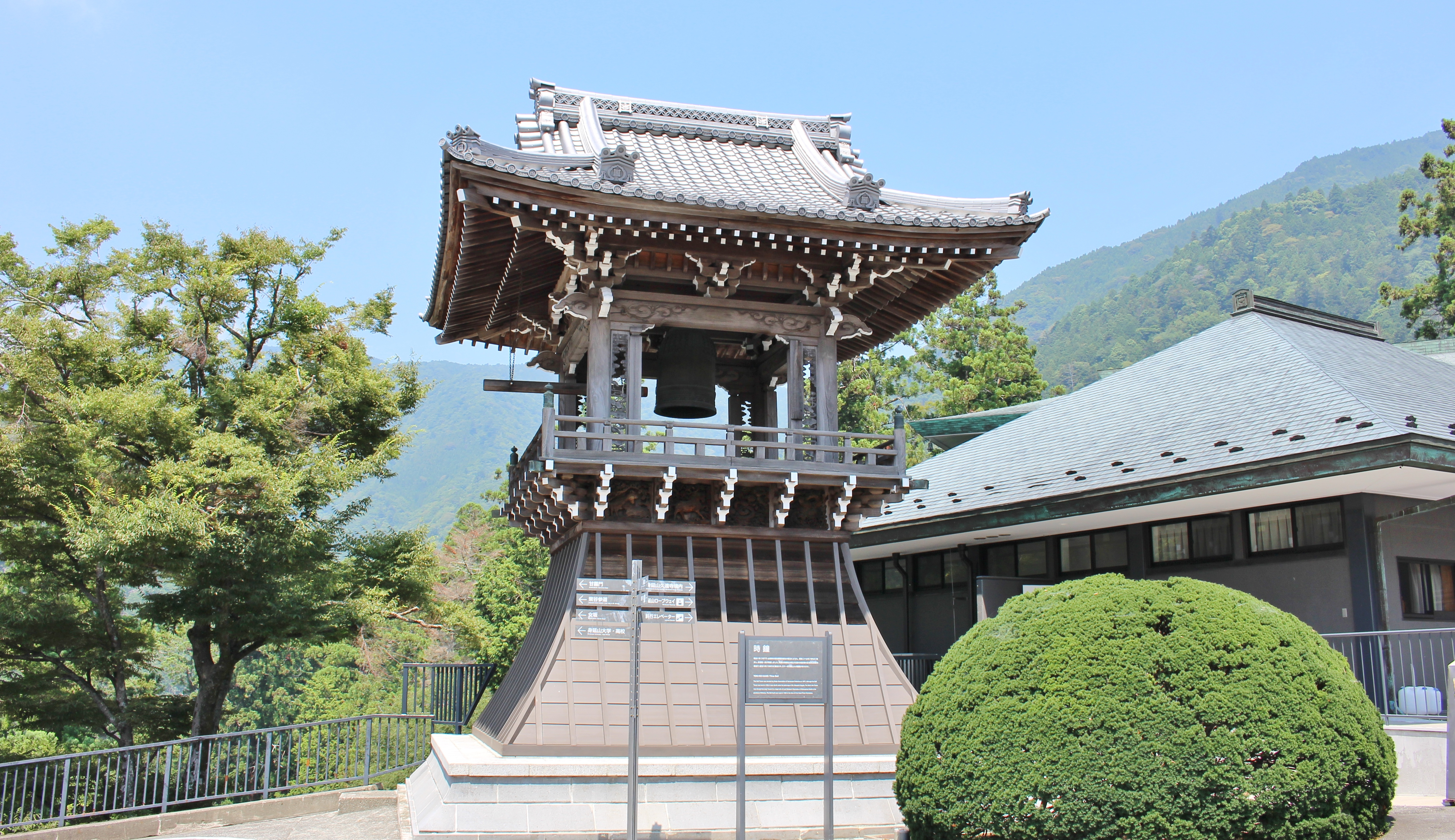
Time-keeping Bell

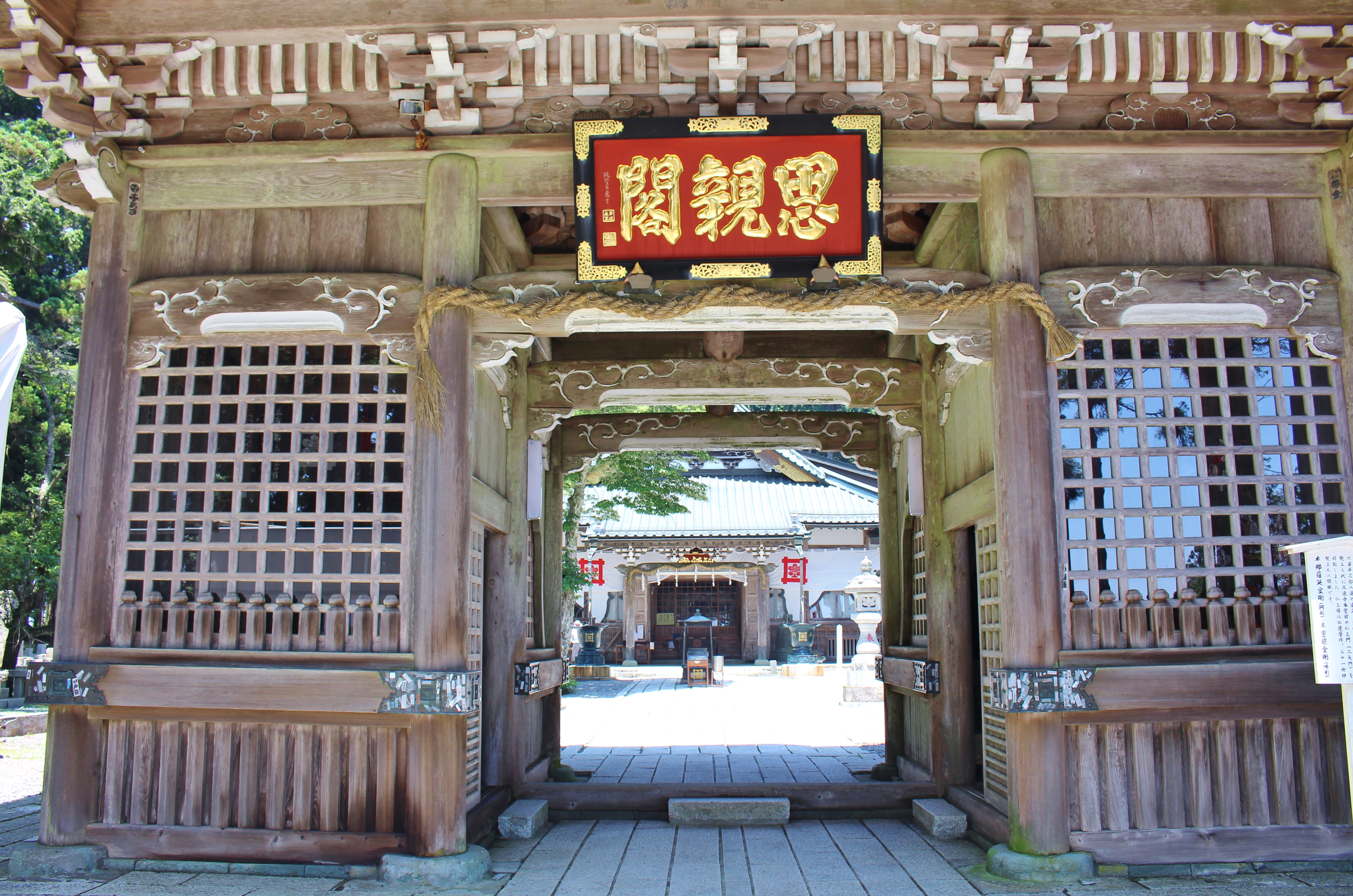
Nio-Mon

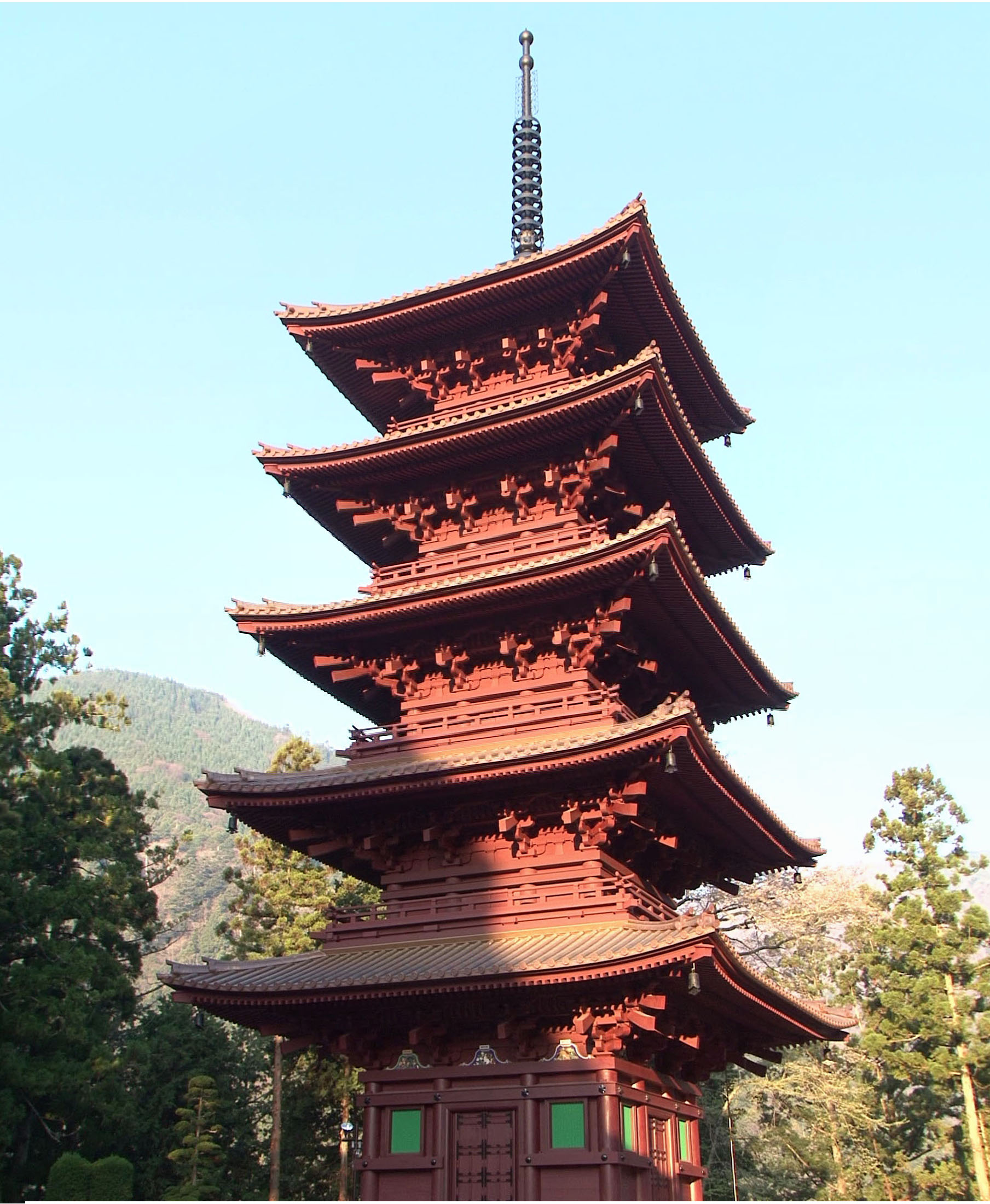
Five-story Pagoda

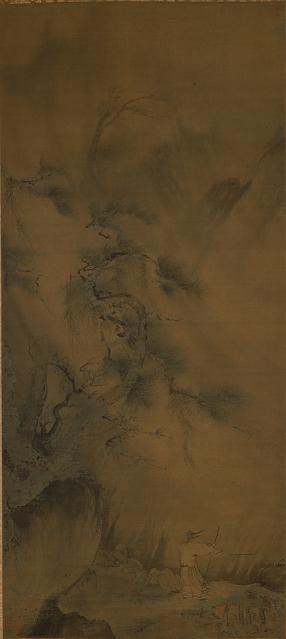
National Treasure "Summer Mountain" scroll

== See also ==
- List of National Treasures of Japan (paintings)
