= Nichiren-shū =

Combination of several Japanese Buddhist schools

The official logo of Nichiren Shu, a family crest adopted in the 16th century from the "Li" Samurai clan as the Tachibana (Mandarin Orange Flower), who became devotees during the Edo period

Nichiren Shū (日蓮宗, School of Nichiren) is a combination of several schools ranging from four of the original Nichiren Buddhist schools that date back to Nichiren's original disciples, and part of the fifth:

List of confederation of Nichiren-shu schools
Name of school	Founder
Minobu-san	Mimbu—Nikō
Hama-san	Nisshō
Ikegami-shu	Nichirō
Nakayama-san	Nichijō (also known as Toki Jōni)
Fuji-Fuse	Nikkō Shōnin (in part only) while some belongs to the Nichiren Shōshū Temple.

== Overview ==
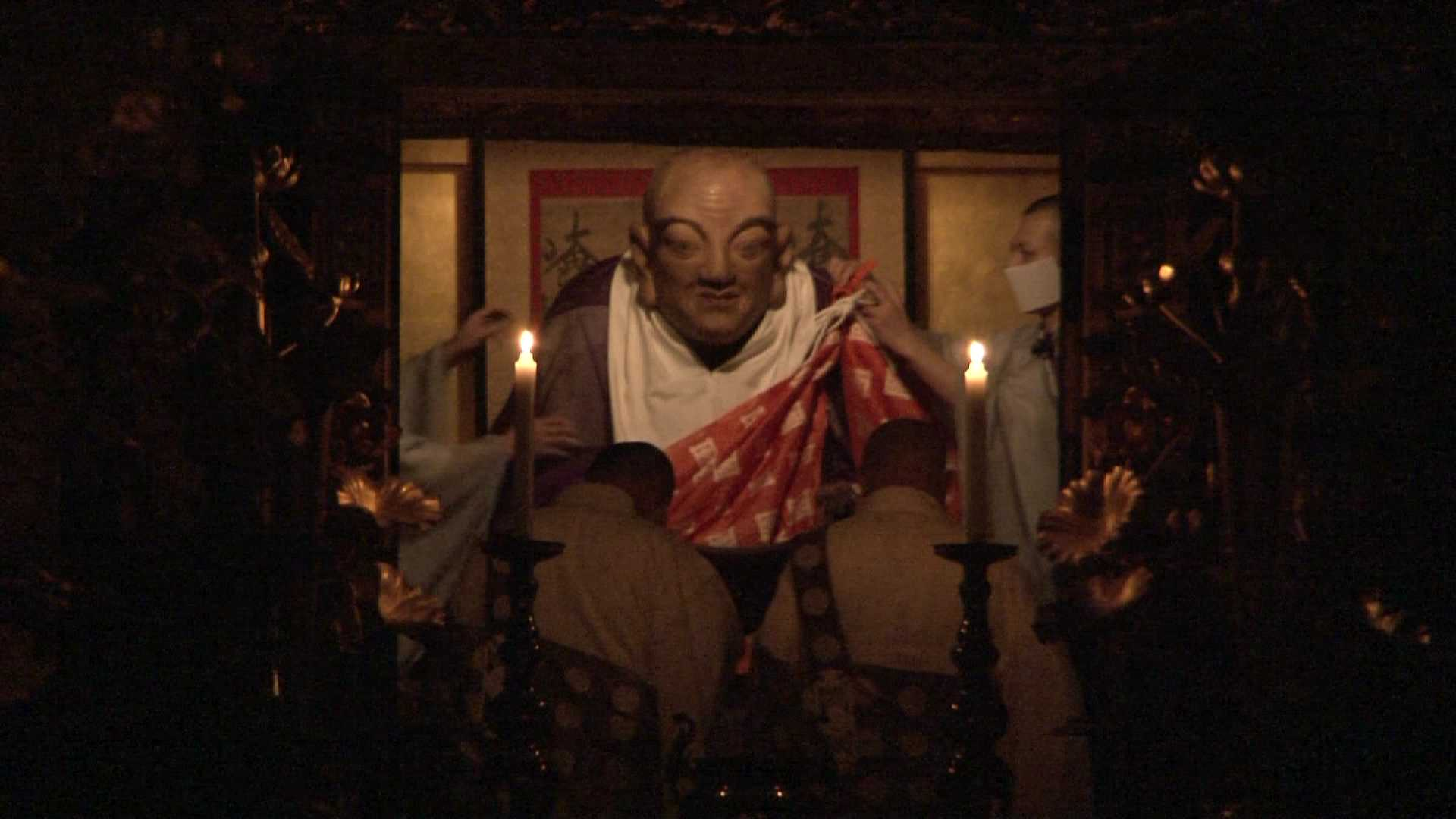
An oversized statue of Nichiren Shonin being vested by resident monks in brocade clothing for his birth anniversary on February 16. The Kuon-ji Temple of Mount Minobu, in Yamanashi prefecture.

The school is often referred to as the Minobu Sect due to its prominence within the Mount Minobu area. The school's head temple, Kuon-ji, is located on Mount Minobu where Nichiren lived in seclusion and where he asked to be buried. Another significant temple of the sect is the Ikegami Honmon-ji where Nichiren died. Accordingly, many of Nichiren's most important personal artifacts and writings, also considered to be National Treasures of Japan, are within their safekeeping.

The sect is also known for its more open and tolerant views of other Buddhist traditions, even mixing or incorporating various mixed Buddhist beliefs and Shinto practices into their own aesthetics, most notably the use of various religious statues, the red stamping practice of Shuin for novelty, esoteric combinations of Buddhist fortune-telling folk practices and Shinto magic rituals, as well as the tolerant photography and lax distribution of the calligraphic Gohonzon.

Nichiren Shū does not believe Nichiren designated a single successor, as taught for instance by Nichiren Shōshū; instead, they maintain that he designated six senior disciples of equal ranking to succeed him.

The Six Senior Disciples designated by Nichiren were:

- Nissho (1221–1323)
- Nichiro (1245–1320)
- Nikkō (1246–1333)
- Mimbu Nikō (1253–1314)
- Nitchō (1252–1317)
- Nichiji (1250–unknown)

Nichiren Shū designates the Shakyamuni Buddha of Chapter 16 of the Lotus Sutra as the Eternal Buddha while Nichiren is regarded as the Jogyo Bodhisattva that possesses the mission in Chapter 21 as the "votary messenger" to uphold the true Dharma in the Latter Day of the Law.

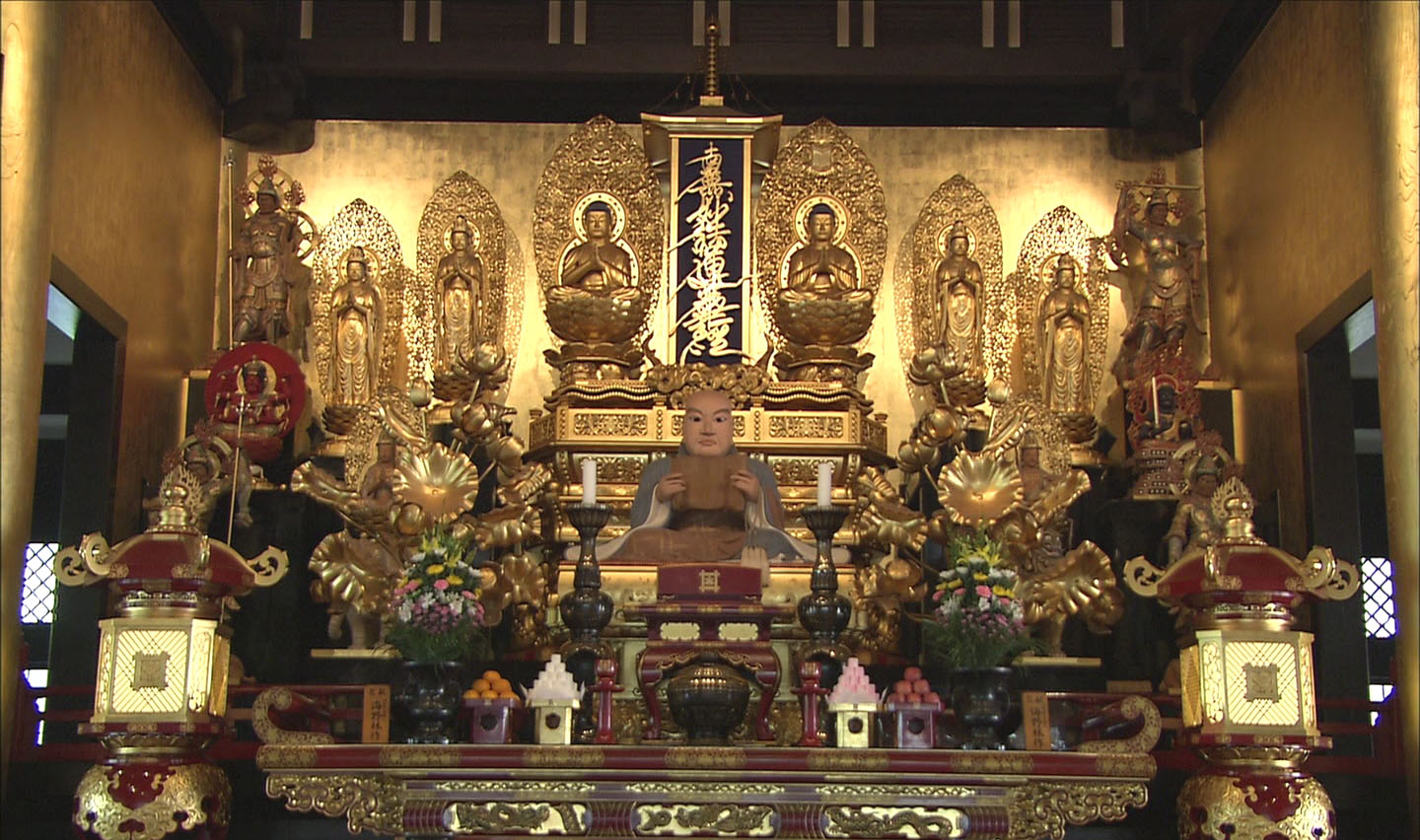
A common Nichiren Shu altar flanked by various statues including a physical representation of Nichiren himself. In other countries of acculturation, a mixture of other religious figures may also be permitted. Kuon-ji temple, Mount Minobu.

The sect designates Shakyamuni as the "Original Buddha" and he alone occupies the central role in Nichiren Shū. Nichiren, referred to as Nichiren Shōnin ("Saint Nichiren"), refocused attention on Shakyamuni by rebuking other Buddhist schools for solely emphasizing other buddhas or esoteric practices or for neglecting or deriding the Lotus Sutra.

Nichiren Shu regards Nichiren's own writings, called Gosho or Goibun (御 遺 文), as commentaries or guides to the doctrines of Buddhism. They include the Five Major Writings of Nichiren in which he establishes doctrine, belief, and practice, as well as many pastoral letters he wrote to his followers.

The sect is highly selective about which Gosho writings it deems authentic. Many Gosho writings accepted by Nichiren Shōshū are not accepted as genuine by Nichiren Shū on grounds that scholars have not verified their authenticity. This dispute arises over the veracity of various disputed writings to be truly authored by Nichiren. The sect does not reject the alleged oral transmissions (including the Ongi Kuden) citing "pastoral value" but which cannot be definitively asserted as Nichiren's own teachings.

== Practices and beliefs ==
The sect upholds five kinds of practices:

1. Receiving and keeping the Sutra both mentally and physically
2. Reading the Sutra visually
3. Reciting the Sutra orally
4. Explaining the Sutra to others
5. Copying the Sutra as a pious act

There are two type of practices expected of a believer:

1. Primary practice – Chanting Odaimoku to an object of devotion.
2. Secondary practice – The recitation of Chapter 2 and 16 of the Lotus Sutra, or any other chapter of the Lotus Sutra as desired.

In addition, other popular forms of Buddhist silent meditation (Shōdai-gyō), singing of hymnal praises, the artistic copying of the Odaimoku (Shakyō), and the study of fundamental Buddhist concepts such as the Four Noble Truths, Threefold Training, Noble Eightfold Path and Taking Refuge taught by Shakyamuni Buddha are also used as supporting practices in the sect.

== Object of worship ==
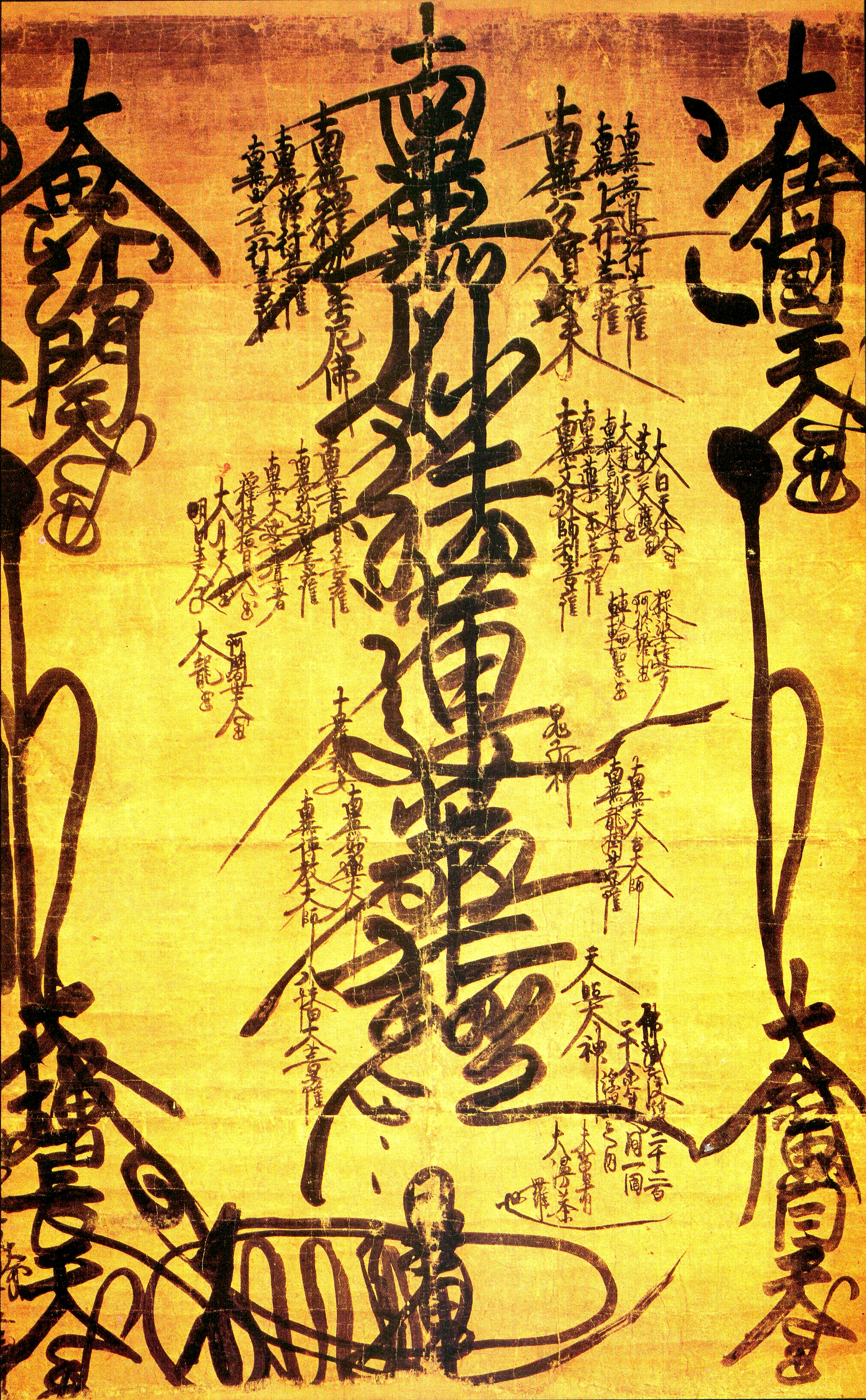
The Rinmetsu Doji Gohonzon (English: "Entering the Wheel of Nirvana"), a Buddhist mandala inscribed by Nichiren in 1280. The central characters are the title of the Lotus Sūtra. This Gohonzon inscribed by Nichiren was displayed at his deathbed, and is oftentimes issued, manufactured, distributed by the Nichiren Shu sect. Currently stored in Hokekyo-Ji Temple in Chiba prefecture.

Nichiren Shū issues calligraphic Gohonzons to its members, but statue arrangements may also be used to represent the Gohonzon. In Nichiren Shū, the following may be used as the Gohonzon:

- A statue of the Shakyamuni Buddha as the Eternal Buddha, sometimes flanked by the Four Bodhisattvas of the Earth
- A stupa with Namu-myōhō-renge-kyō inscribed on it, flanked by the Buddhas Shakyamuni and Prabhutaratna Buddha
- A single inscription of the Odaimoku (Ippen Shudai)
- The Rin-metsu gohonzon of Nichiren, now claimed as the Shutei Gohonzon of Nichiren Shu

All fully ordained Nichiren Shū ministers are able to inscribe and consecrate mandalas, but in practice few of them do. They usually bestow a copy of a Nichiren inscribed mandala, called the Shutei Gohonzon, upon their members.

== Holidays ==
Holidays observed in Nichiren Shū:

- 15 February – Nirvana Day; death anniversary of Shakyamuni Buddha
- 16 February – Nichiren's birthday
- 21 March – Higan Equinox festival
- 8 April – Buddha's Birthday
- 13–15 July and August – Urabon ancestry festival
- 13 October – death anniversary of Nichiren (Oeshiki)
- 8 December – Bodhi Day

== Historic temples ==
- Hokekyo-ji, temple safekeeping the original of the Rissho Ankoku Ron, one of Nichiren's most important writings
- Ikegami Honmon-ji, founded on the site where Nichiren passed and was cremated
- Kuon-ji, founded by Nichiren
- Kyōnin-ji, marks the site where Nichiren was attacked in 1281
- Ryūkō-ji, marks the site where Nichiren was to be executed
- Seichō-ji, originally a temple of the Tendai-shū and later Shingon-shū; converted into a temple of the Nichiren-shū in 1949 as it played an important role in Nichiren-Buddhism
- Tanjō-ji, near the site of Nichiren's parental home (the original site is under sea level today)

== Nichiren Shū today ==
Nichiren Shū first spread overseas with Japanese immigrants to the United States, then to the Kingdom of Hawaii, Brazil and other locations in the latter half of the 19th century and the early 20th century. Presently, there are Nichiren Shū temples and Sanghas in the United States, Japan, Canada, Mexico, Costa Rica, much of South America, India, Korea, Southeast Asia (Indonesia, Malaysia, Singapore and Taiwan), and Europe.

Nichiren Shū also ordains non-Japanese and non-Japanese speaking men and women, and continues to expand its presence overseas. Nichiren Shū maintains relations with other Nichiren schools and non-Nichiren schools.

In 2010, Nichiren Shū described itself as a "religious organization consisting of about 5,000 temples, 8,000 ministers and 3.8 million members worldwide."

== Differences and similarities with other schools ==
=== Gohonzon ===
The sect does not believe in the Dai-Gohonzon revered in Nichiren Shoshu to be superior to other Gohonzons, and rejects the claim that it was truly inscribed by Nichiren as fraudulent.

Although the Dai Gohonzon in itself is a valid Mandala Gohonzon, this concept of a super Gohonzon that empowers all the others blatantly contradicted Nichiren Daishonin's teachings and, consequently, created a great feeling of mistrust with other temples of Nikko.

=== View of Nichiren ===
Nichiren Shu states the following:

First, the power of any Gohonzon, including the Dai-Gohonzon, can be tapped only through the power of faith. In other words, we should be clear that it is wrong to think that the Dai-Gohonzon alone has some kind of unique mystic power that no other Gohonzon possesses. The Dai-Gohonzon and our own Gohonzon are equal.

The sect regards Nichiren as Visistacaritra and teaches that Shakyamuni Buddha is special because he was the original Buddha in recorded human history that demonstrated an exemplary model for the pursuit of Buddhism by his followers and disciples.

- The sect rejects the Nichiren Shōshū claim that Nichiren was the "Original Buddha of Kuon Ganjo" from a timeless past.
- It also rejects the belief of Soka Gakkai which views Nichiren as simply an ordinary mortal person who attained Buddhahood.
- Nichiren Shu disputes the claim of Nichiren Shōshū designating Nikkō Shōnin as the sole legitimate successor to Nichiren, claiming it is based on fake documents and invented doctrines.
- The sect does not have a general consensus on the authenticity of some of the writings claimed to be from Nichiren, rendering them as apocryphal within Nichiren Shū.

=== Three Great Hidden Dharmas ===
Accordingly, Nichiren Shu shares the doctrine of The Three Great Hidden Dharmas (also known as "The Three Great Secret Laws"), but still differs them on the meaning:

1. "Odaimoku" – (The sectarian pronunciation of "Namu Myoho Renge Kyo"), its meaning and intent.
2. Lotus Sutra – (as Sources of Doctrine) which chapters are used, recited and revered as valid.
3. "Kaidan" – (defined platform for practice), its meaning and intent.

== See also ==
- Masaichi Nagata
