= Ikegami Honmon-ji =

Head temple of the Nichiren Shū in Tokyo, Japan

Coordinates: 35°34′44″N 139°42′19″E

- 池上本門寺
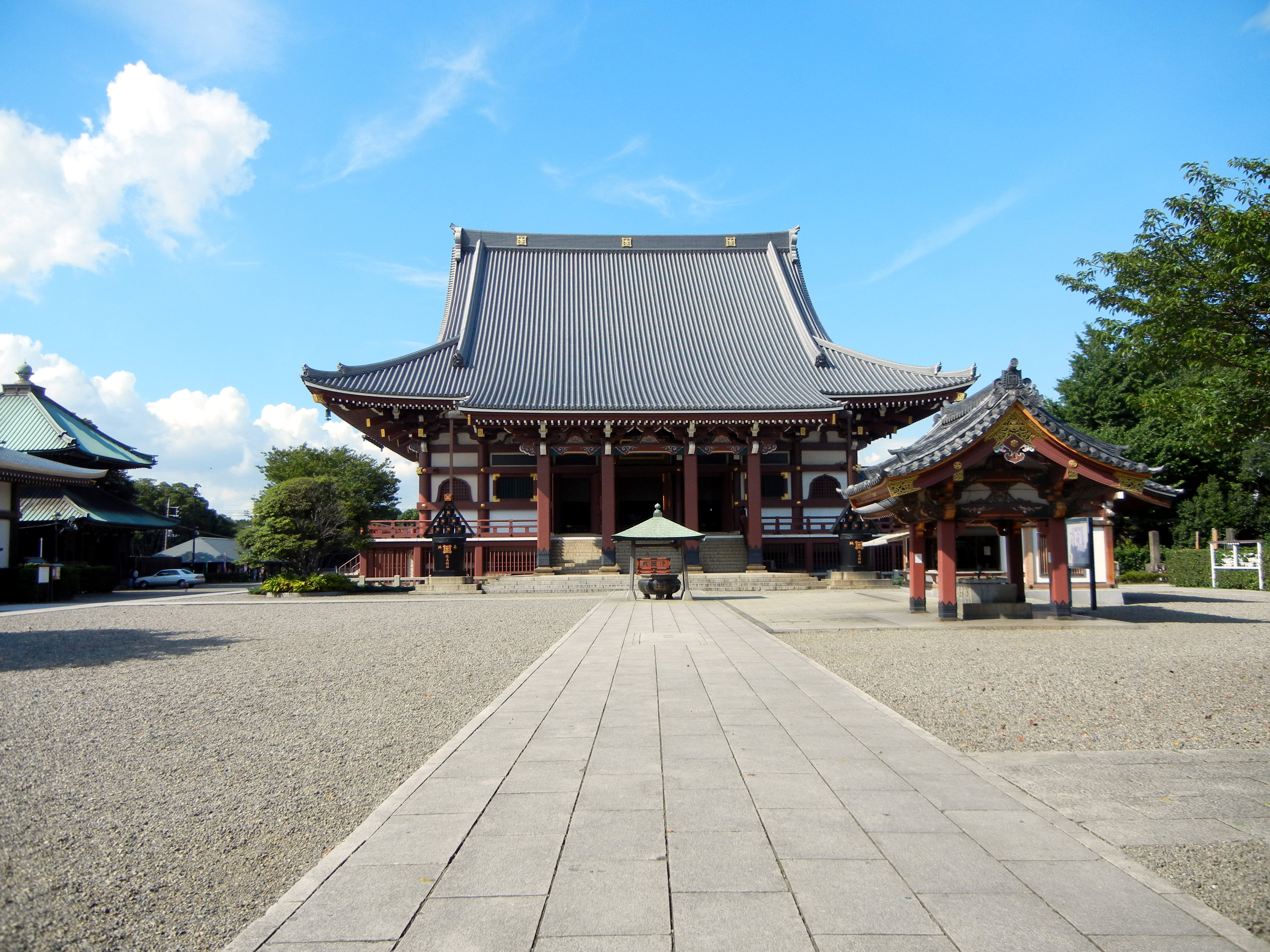
- Soshi-dō (founder’s hall)

Religion
- Affiliation: Nichiren Buddhism

Location
- Location: 1-1-1, Ikegami, Ōta-ku; Tokyo 146-8576
- Country: Japan
- Interactive map of Ikegami Honmon-ji

Architecture
- Founder: Nichiren
- Completed: 1282

Website
- Ikegami Honmon Temple

Ikegami Honmon-ji (池上本門寺) is a temple of the Nichiren Shū south of Tokyo, erected where Nichiren is said to have died.

A short walk from Ikegami Station (Tōkyū Ikegami Line) or Nishi-Magome Station (Toei Asakusa Line), Ikegami Honmon-ji contains a number of buildings, most of which have been reconstructed since the bombing of 15 March 1945. They include the Important Cultural Property designated five-storey pagoda built in 1608, the kyōzō (経蔵, repository of religious writings) built in 1784, and the hōtō (宝塔), built in 1781 where Nichiren was cremated. Other buildings have been rebuilt, or newly constructed, since 1945.

Now in Ōta-ku, suburban Tokyo, Ikegami Honmon-ji was at some distance from the city until the mid-20th century. Basil Hall Chamberlain and W. B. Mason wrote of it in 1907: "Its fine situation and magnificent timber make it one of the most attractive points within easy reach of Tōkyō."

The area between the station and the temple hosts a large festival, O-Eshiki (お会式), from 11 to 13 October, with mandō (万灯, an elaborate representation of a lantern stand) and matoi; thousands of worshippers visit the temple.

A memorial tablet for the sinking of the American warship USS Oneida (1861) which was rammed and sank outside Yokohama by the British steamer Bombay on 24 January 1870, with a loss of 125 people, was placed at the temple in May 1889, after a Buddhist ceremony was held in memory of the lost sailors.

== Gallery ==
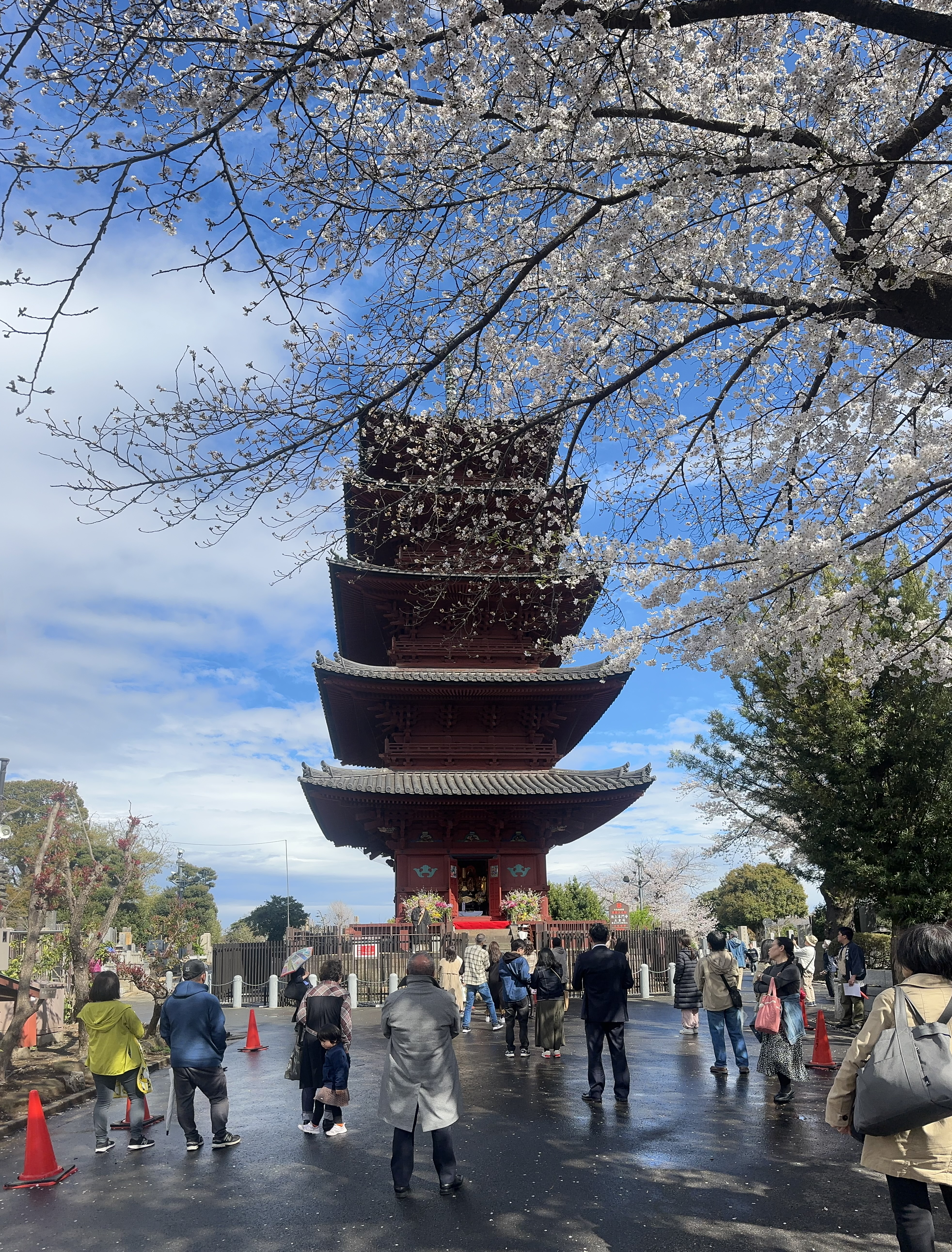
Five-story Pagoda of Ikegami Honmon-ji Temple

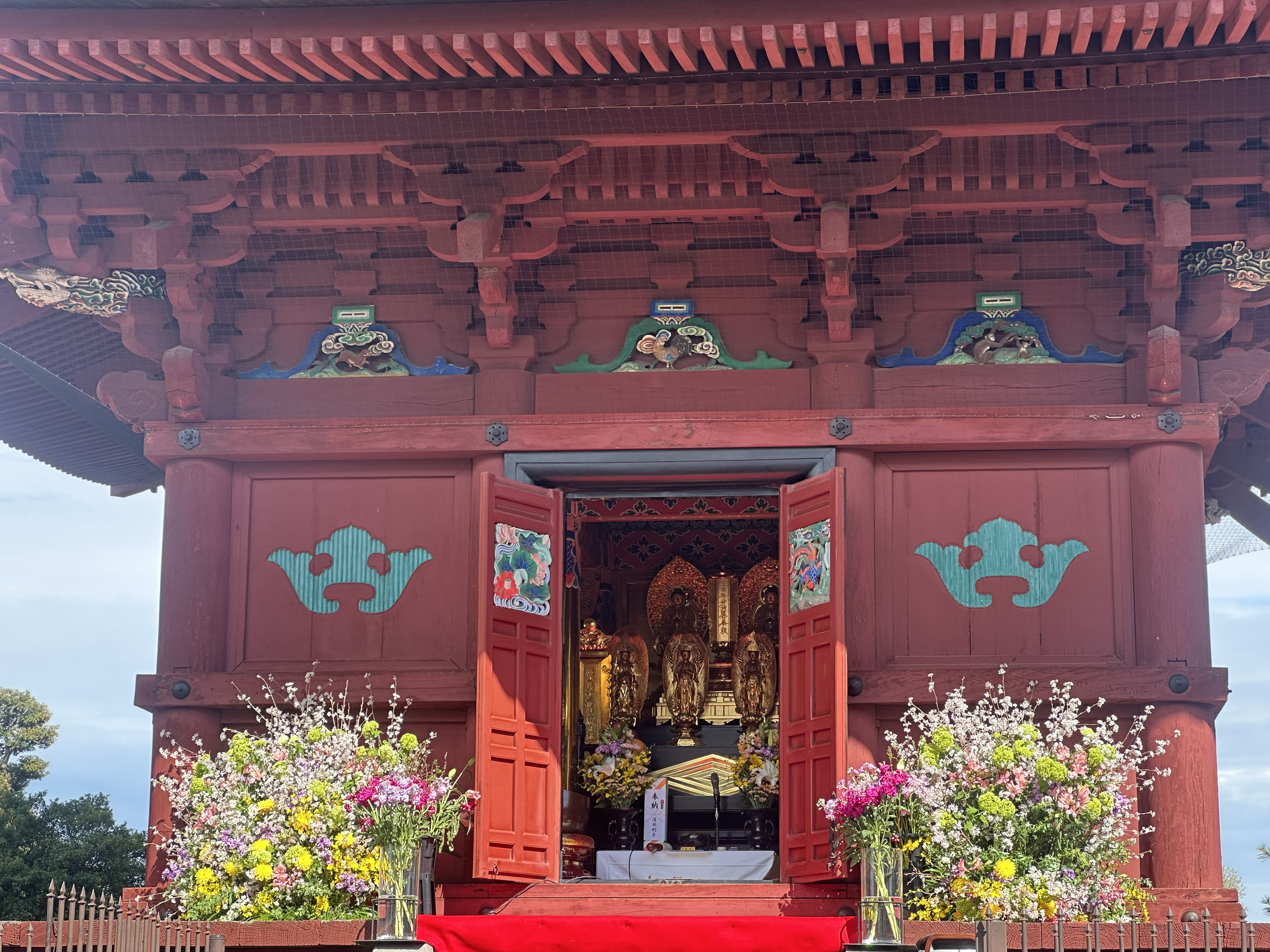
Inside the Five-story Pagoda

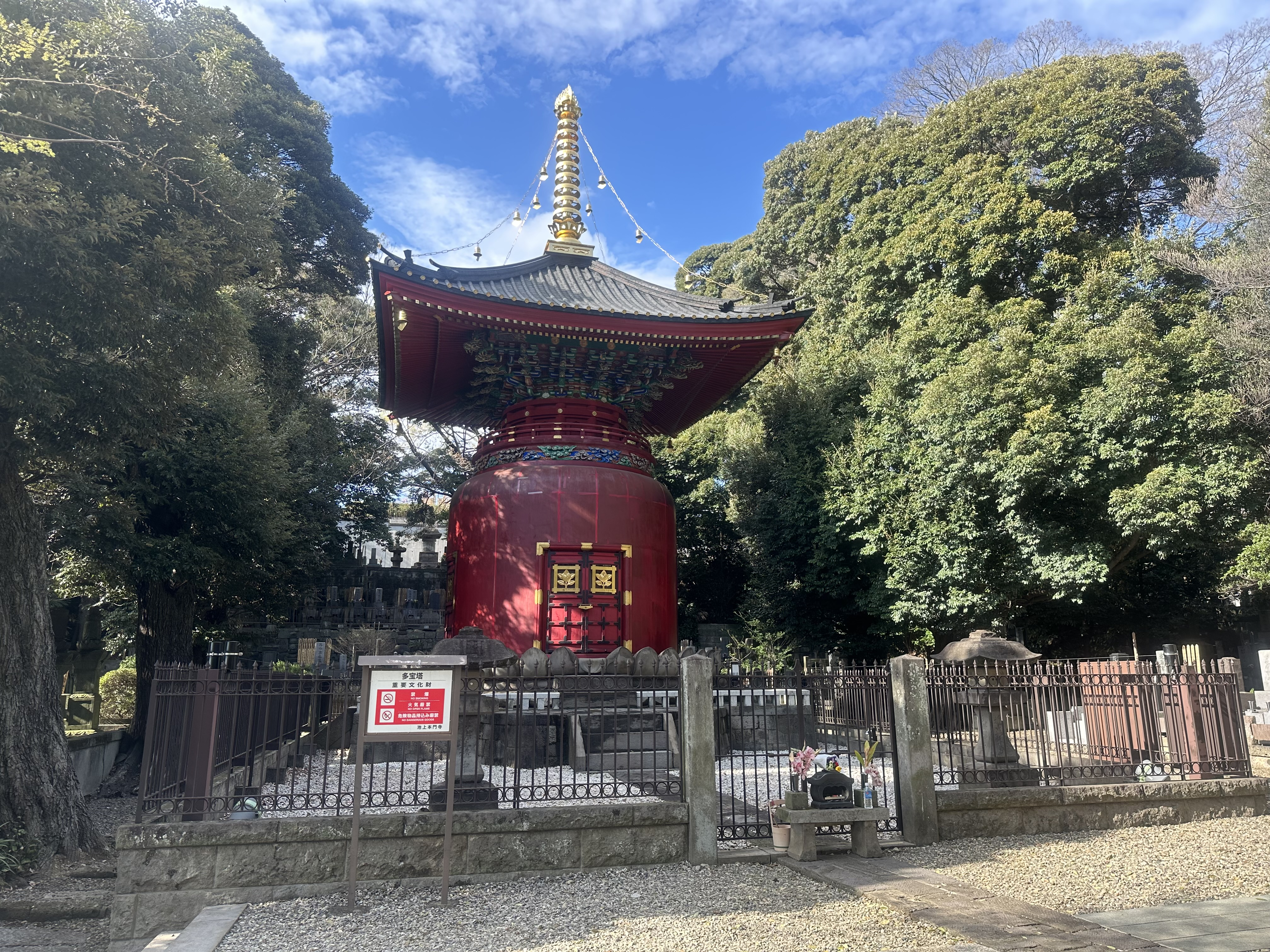
hōtō

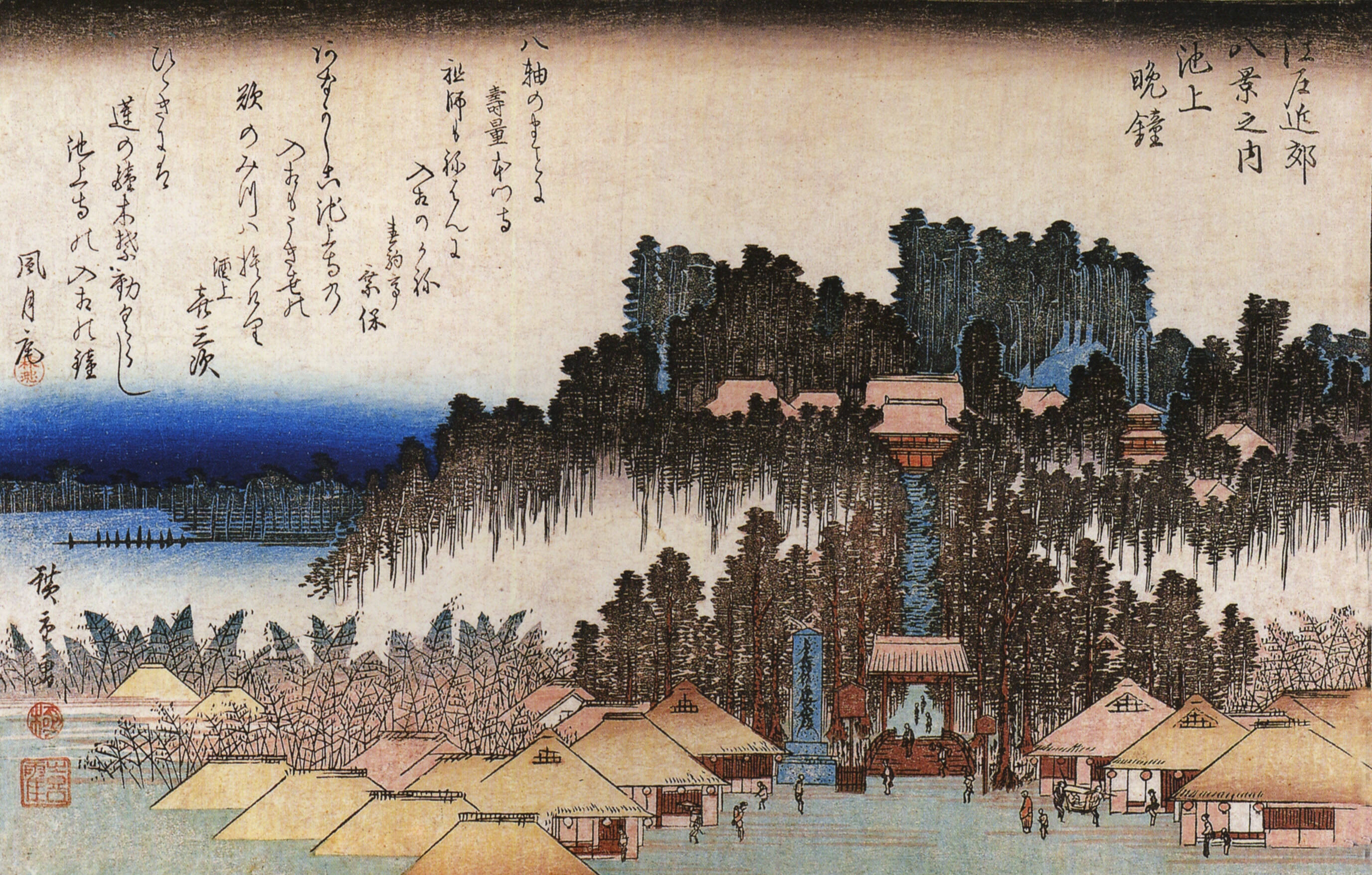
Hiroshige

Several scenes of the temple in spring

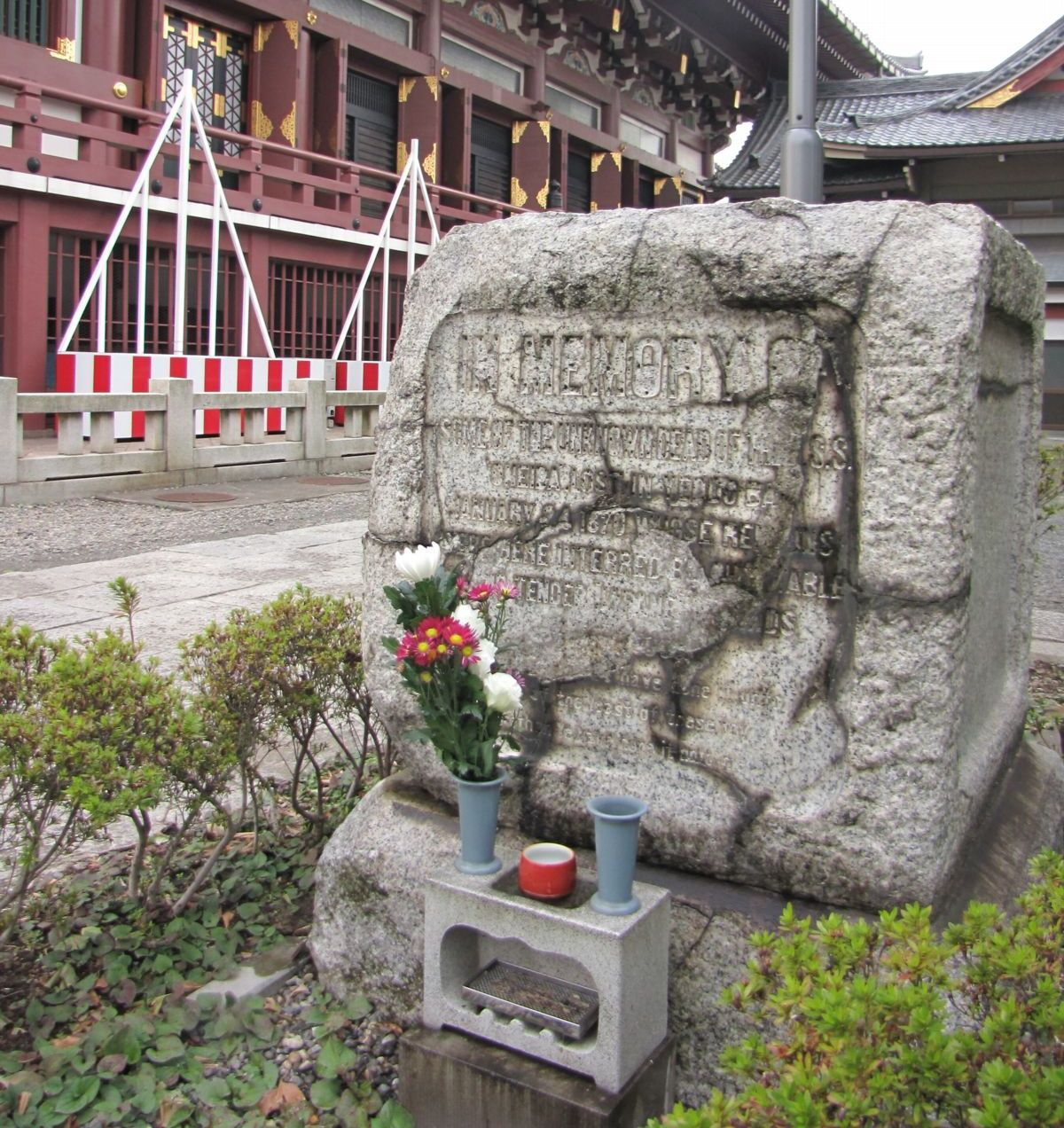
A memorial tablet for the USS Oneida (1861), which sank outside Yokohama on 24 January 1870.
