= Schools of Buddhism =

Institutional and doctrinal divisions of Buddhism

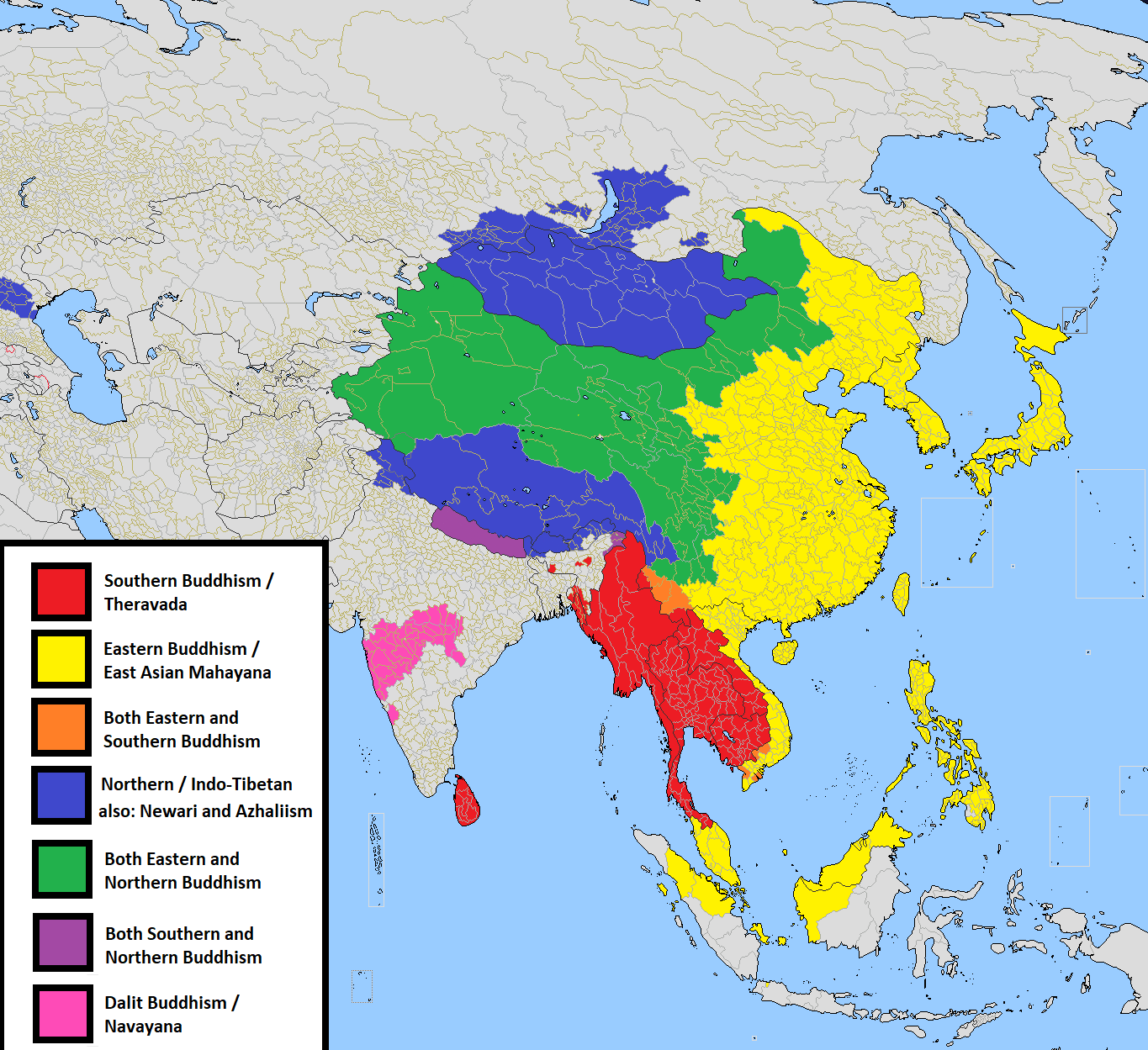
Northern Buddhism: Blue (Vajrayana) Eastern Buddhism: Yellow (Mahayana) Southern Buddhism: Red (Theravada)

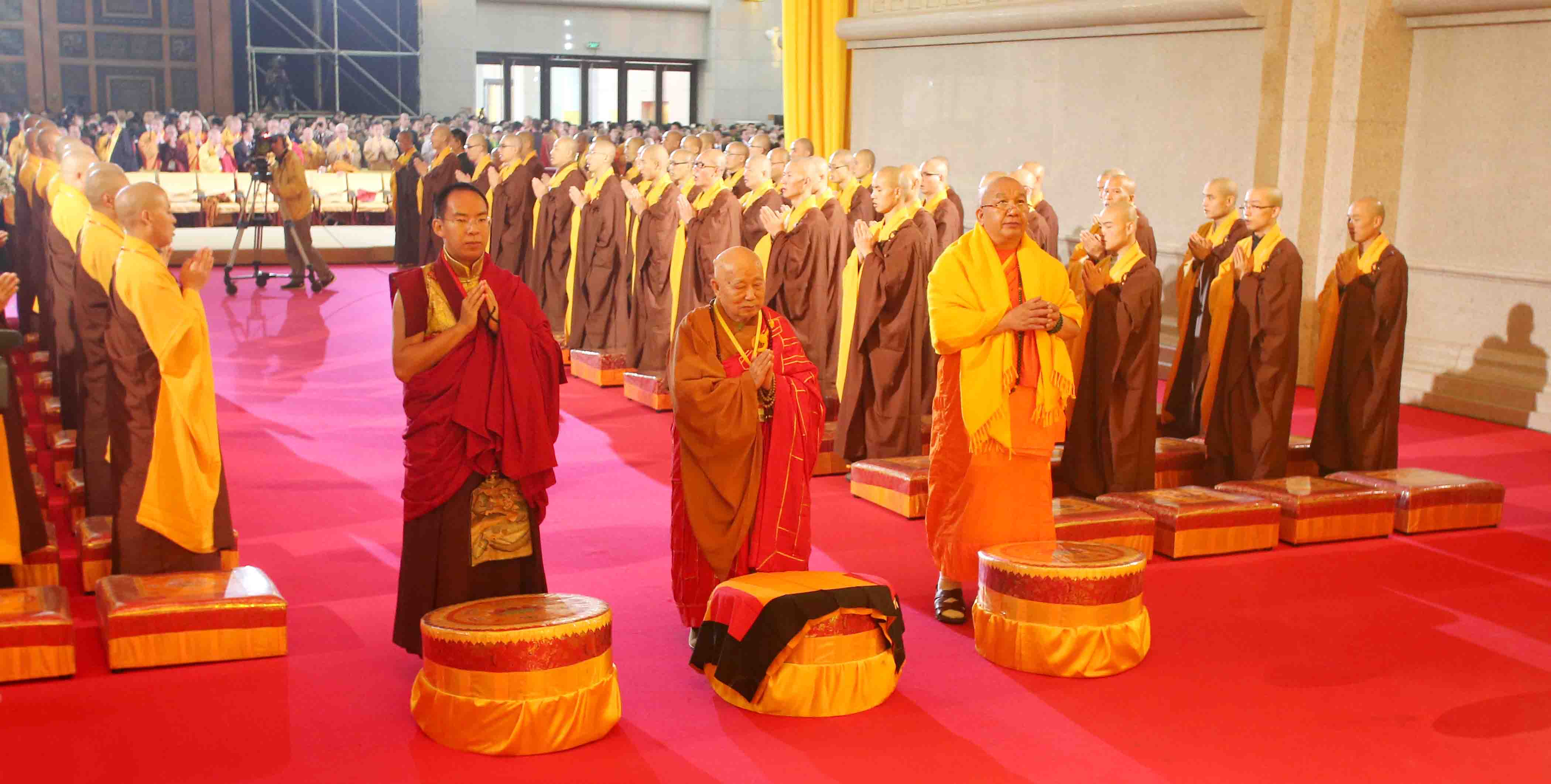
Representatives from the three major modern Buddhist traditions, at the World Fellowship of Buddhists, 27th General Conference, 2014.

The schools of Buddhism are the various institutional and doctrinal divisions of Buddhism, which are based on various differences, such as geography, historical schisms and sectarianism, and the differing teachings and interpretations of Buddhist texts.

The branching of Buddhism into separate schools has been occurring from ancient times up to the present, beginning with the first schism. The classification and nature of the various doctrinal, philosophical, practical, or cultural facets of the schools of Buddhism is complex and has been interpreted in many different ways. This complexity is partly due to the sheer number (perhaps thousands) of different sects, sub-sects, movements, worldviews, etc. that make up the whole of the Buddhist tradition. The study of the sectarian and conceptual divisions of Buddhist thought are part of the modern framework of Buddhist studies, as well as comparative religion in Asia. Some factors in Buddhist doctrine, such as the four noble truths, and karma and rebirth, appear to be relatively consistent across different schools. Others views vary considerably, such as the understanding of the nature of the Buddha and the canons of Buddhist scriptures.

From a largely English-language standpoint, and to some extent in most of Western academia, Buddhism is separated into two groups: Theravāda (lit. 'the Teaching of the Elders' or 'the Ancient Teaching'), and Mahāyāna (lit. 'the Great Vehicle'). The most common classification among scholars is threefold: Theravāda, Mahāyāna and Vajrayāna. Another common division is cultural-geographical, dividing Buddhism into: Southern Buddhism, Northern or Himalayan (Tibetan) Buddhism, and East Asian Buddhism.

Apart from these major categories, there are many Buddhist new religious movements that developed in the modern era, including the Indian Dalit Buddhist movement and many of the Japanese new religions.

== Classifications ==
Percentage of Buddhists by country in 2010, according to the Pew Research Center.

In contemporary Buddhist studies, modern Buddhism is often divided into three major branches, traditions or categories:

- Theravāda ("Teaching of the Elders"), also called "Southern Buddhism", mainly dominant in Sri Lanka and Southeast Asia. This tradition generally focuses on the study of its main textual collection, the Pali Canon as well as other forms of Pali literature. The Pali language is thus its lingua franca and sacred language. This tradition is sometimes denominated as a part of Nikaya Buddhism, referring to the conservative Buddhist traditions in India that did not accept the Mahāyāna sutras into their Tripitaka collection of scriptures. It is also sometimes seen as the only surviving school out of the Early Buddhist schools, being derived from the Sthavira Nikāya via the Sri Lankan Mahavihara tradition.
- East Asian Mahāyāna ("Great Vehicle"), East Asian Buddhism or "Eastern Buddhism", prominent in East Asia and derived from the Chinese Buddhist traditions which began to develop during the Han Dynasty. This tradition focuses on the teachings found in Mahāyāna sutras (which are not considered canonical or authoritative in the Theravāda schools), preserved in the Chinese Buddhist Canon, in the classical Chinese language. There are many schools and traditions, with different texts and practices, such as the meditation-focused Zen (Chan) Buddhist traditions and the devotional Pure Land sects (see below).
- Vajrayāna ("Vajra Vehicle"), also known as Mantrayāna (the vehicle of mantras), Tantric Buddhism and Esoteric Buddhism. This category is mostly represented in "Northern Buddhism", also called "Indo-Tibetan Buddhism" (or just "Tibetan Buddhism"), but also overlaps with certain forms of East Asian Buddhism (see: Shingon, Mikkyō, Chinese esoteric Buddhism). Vajrayāna is the dominant form of Buddhism in Tibet, Bhutan, Sikkim, and the Himalayan region of India and Nepal, as well as in Mongolia, Inner Mongolia, and the Russian republics of Buryatia, Kalmykia, and Tuva. It is sometimes considered to be a part of the broader category of Mahāyāna Buddhism instead of a separate tradition. The main texts of Indo-Tibetan Buddhism are contained in the Kanjur and the Tenjur. Besides the study of major Mahāyāna texts, this branch emphasizes the study of Buddhist tantric materials, mainly those related to the Buddhist tantras.

Another way of classifying the different forms of Buddhism is through the different monastic ordination traditions. There are three main traditions of monastic law (Vinaya) each corresponding to the first three categories outlined above:

- Theravāda Vinaya
- Dharmaguptaka Vinaya (East Asian Mahayana)
- Mūlasarvāstivāda Vinaya (Tibetan Buddhism)

== Terminology ==
The terminology for the major divisions of Buddhism can be confusing, as Buddhism is variously divided by scholars and practitioners according to geographic, historical, and philosophical criteria rather than criteria of the adherents themselves, with different terms often being used in different contexts. The following terms may be encountered in descriptions of the major Buddhist divisions:

Conservative Buddhism
an alternative name for the early Buddhist schools.
Early Buddhist schools
the schools into which Buddhism became divided in its first few centuries; according to some scholars only one of these, Theravāda, survives as an independent school (derived from the early Tamraparniya school), although others would claim the various Mahāyāna branches all derived mainly from the early Caitika school.
East Asian Buddhism
a term used by scholars to cover the Buddhist traditions of Japan, Korea, Vietnam and most of China and Southeast Asia
Eastern Buddhism
an alternative name used by some scholars for East Asian Buddhism; also sometimes used to refer to all traditional forms of Buddhism, as distinct from Western(ized) forms.
Ekayāna (one yana)
Mahayana texts such as the Lotus Sutra and the Avatamsaka Sutra sought to unite all the different teachings into a single great way. These texts serve as the inspiration for using the term Ekayāna in the sense of "one vehicle." This "one vehicle" became a key aspect of the doctrines and practices of Tiantai and Tendai Buddhist sects, which subsequently influenced Chán and Zen doctrines and practices. In Japan, the one-vehicle teaching of the Lotus Sutra is also a main doctrine of Nichiren Buddhist sects. The Lotus Sutra is so central to these sects that meditation was replaced by chanting the Japanese words Namu Myoho Renge Kyo ("The Way of the Lotus Sutra") in religious practice.
Esoteric Buddhism
usually considered synonymous with "Vajrayāna". Some scholars have applied the term to certain practices found within the Theravāda, particularly in Cambodia.
Hīnayāna
literally meaning "lesser vehicle." It is considered a controversial term when applied by Mahāyānists to refer to the Theravāda schools, and as such is widely viewed as condescending and pejorative. (Note: Hinayana (literally, "inferior way") is a polemical term, which self-described Mahāyāna (literally, "great way") Buddhist literature uses to denigrate its opponents.) Moreover, Hīnayāna refers to now non-extant schools with limited sets of views, practices, and results, which emerged prior to the development of Mahāyāna traditions. The term is currently most often used as a way of describing a stage on the path in Tibetan Buddhism, but is often mistakenly confused with the contemporary Theravāda tradition, which is a far more complex, diversified, and profound phenomenon than the literal and limiting definition attributed to the word Hīnayāna in the aforementioned context. Its use in scholarly publications is now also considered controversial. (Note: "The supposed Mahayana-Hinayana dichotomy is so prevalent in Buddhist literature, that it has yet fully to loosen its hold over scholarly representations of the religion".)
Lamaism
synonymous with Tibetan Buddhism; an old term, sometimes still used, but widely considered derogatory.
Mahāyāna
a movement that emerged from early Buddhist schools, together with its later descendants, East Asian and Tibetan Buddhism. Vajrayāna traditions are sometimes listed separately. The main use of the term in East Asian and Tibetan traditions is in reference to spiritual levels, regardless of school.
Mainstream Buddhism
a term used by some scholars for the early Buddhist schools.
Mantrayāna
usually considered synonymous with Vajrayāna. The Tendai and Shingon schools in Japan have been described as influenced by Mantrayana.
Navayāna
("new vehicle") refers to the re-interpretation of Buddhism by modern Indian jurist and social reformer B. R. Ambedkar.
Newar Buddhism
a non-monastic, caste-based Buddhism with patrilineal descent and Sanskrit texts.
Nikāya Buddhism
a non-derogatory substitute term for Hinayana or the early Buddhist schools.
Non-Mahāyāna
an alternative term for the early Buddhist schools.
Northern Buddhism
an alternative term used by some scholars for Tibetan Buddhism. Also, an older term still sometimes used to encompass both East Asian and Tibetan traditions. It has even been used to refer to East Asian Buddhism alone, without Tibetan Buddhism.
Secret Mantra
an alternative rendering of Mantrayāna, a more literal translation of the term used by schools in Tibetan Buddhism when referring to themselves.
Sectarian Buddhism
an alternative name for the early Buddhist schools.
Southeast Asian Buddhism
an alternative name used by some scholars for Theravāda.
Southern Buddhism
an alternative name used by some scholars for Theravāda.
Śrāvakayāna
an alternative term sometimes used for the early Buddhist schools.
Tantrayāna or Tantric Buddhism
usually considered synonymous with "Vajrayāna". However, one scholar describes the tantra divisions of some editions of the Tibetan scriptures as including Śravakayāna, Mahāyāna and Vajrayāna texts (see Buddhist texts). Some scholars, particularly François Bizot, have used the term Tantric Theravada to refer to certain practices found particularly in Cambodia.
Theravāda
the Buddhism of Sri Lanka, Bangladesh, Burma, Thailand, Laos, Cambodia, and parts of Vietnam, China, India, and Malaysia. It is considered by some scholars to be the only surviving representative of the historical early Buddhist schools. The term Theravāda is also sometimes used to refer to all of the early Buddhist schools.
Tibetan Buddhism
usually understood as including the Buddhism of Tibet, Mongolia, Bhutan, and parts of China, India, and Russia, which follow the Tibetan tradition.
Vajrayāna
a movement that developed out of Indian Mahāyāna, together with its later descendants. There is some disagreement on exactly which traditions fall into this category. Tibetan Buddhism is universally recognized as falling under this heading; many also include the Japanese Shingon school. Some scholars also apply the term to the Korean milgyo tradition, which is not a separate school. One scholar says, "Despite the efforts of generations of Buddhist thinkers, it remains exceedingly difficult to identify precisely what it is that sets the Vajrayana apart."

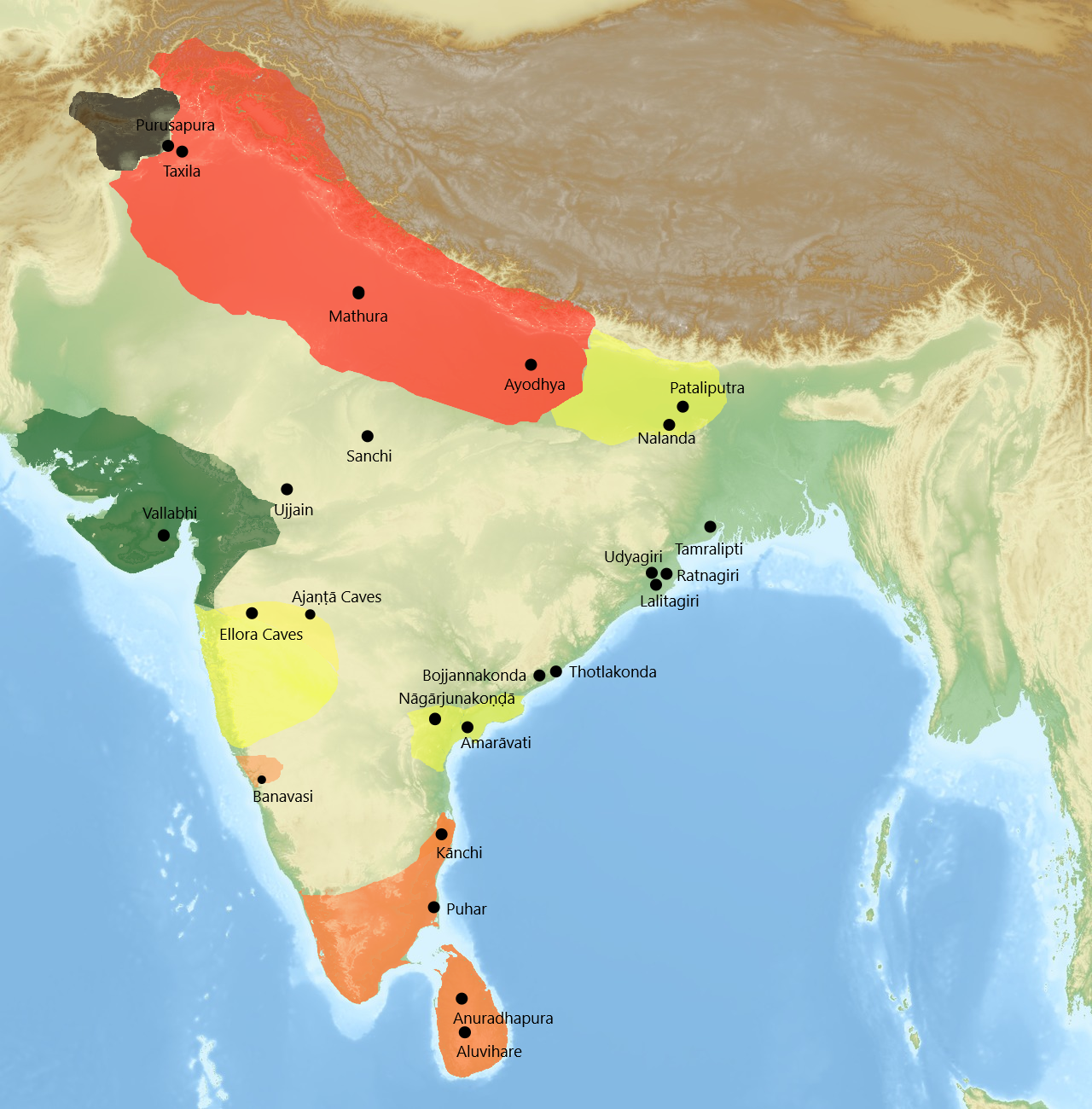
Map of the major geographical centers of major Buddhist schools in South Asia, at around the time of Xuanzang's visit in the seventh century. * Red: non-Pudgalavāda Sarvāstivāda school * Orange: non-Dharmaguptaka Vibhajyavāda schools * Yellow: Mahāsāṃghika * Green: Pudgalavāda (Green) * Gray: Dharmaguptaka Note the red and grey schools already gave some original ideas of Mahayana Buddhism and the Sri Lankan section (see Tamrashatiya) of the orange school is the origin of modern Theravada Buddhism.

== Early schools ==
The early Buddhist schools or mainstream sects refers to the sects into which the Indian Buddhist monastic saṅgha split. They are also called the Nikaya Buddhist schools, and in Mahayana Buddhism they are referred to either as the Śrāvaka (disciple) schools or Hinayana (inferior) schools.

Most scholars now believe that the first schism was originally caused by differences in vinaya (monastic rule). Later splits were also due to doctrinal differences and geographical separation.

The first schism separated the community into two groups, the Sthavira (Elders) Nikaya and the Mahāsāṃghika (Great Community). Most scholars hold that this probably occurred after the time of Ashoka. Out of these two main groups later arose many other sects or schools.

From the Sthaviras arose the Sarvāstivāda sects, the Vibhajyavādins, the Theravadins, the Dharmaguptakas and the Pudgalavāda sects.

The Sarvāstivāda school, popular in northwest India and Kashmir, focused on Abhidharma teachings. Their name means "the theory that all exists" which refers to one of their main doctrines, the view that all dharmas exist in the past, present and in the future. This is an eternalist theory of time. Over time, the Sarvāstivādins became divided into various traditions, mainly the Vaibhāṣika (who defended the orthodox "all exists" doctrine in their Abhidharma compendium called the Mahāvibhāṣa Śāstra), the Sautrāntika (who rejected the Vaibhāṣika orthodoxy) and the Mūlasarvāstivāda.

The Pudgalavāda sects (also known as Vātsīputrīyas) were another group of Sthaviras which were known for their unique doctrine of the pudgala (person). Their tradition was founded by the elder Vātsīputra circa 3rd century BCE.

The Vibhajyavādins were conservative Sthaviras who did not accept the doctrines of either the Sarvāstivāda or the Pudgalavāda. In Sri Lanka, a group of them became known as Theravada, the only one of these sects that survives to the present day. Another sect which arose from the Vibhajyavādins were the Dharmaguptakas. This school was influential in spreading Buddhism to Central Asia and to China. Their Vinaya is still used in East Asian Buddhism.

The Mahāsāṃghikas also split into various sub groups. One of these were the Lokottaravādins (Transcendentalists), so called because of their doctrine which saw every action of the Buddha, even mundane ones like eating, as being of a supramundane and transcendental nature. One of the few Mahāsāṃghika texts which survive, the Mahāvastu, is from this school. Another sub-sect which emerged from the Mahāsāṃghika was called the Caitika. They were concentrated in Andhra Pradesh and in South India. Some scholars such as A.K. Warder hold that many important Mahayana sutras originated among these groups. Another Mahāsāṃghika sect was named Prajñaptivāda. They were known for the doctrine that viewed all conditioned phenomena as being mere concepts (Skt. prajñapti).

According to the Indian philosopher Paramartha, a further split among the Mahāsāṃghika occurred with the arrival of the Mahayana sutras. Some sub-schools, such as the Kukkuṭikas, did not accept the Mahayana sutras as being word of the Buddha, whole others, like the Lokottaravādins, did accept them.

Although there are differences in the historical records as to the exact composition of the various schools of early Buddhism, a hypothetical combined list would be as follows:

- Sthaviravāda
  - Pudgalavāda ('Personalist') (c. 280 BCE)
    - Vatsīputrīya (during Aśoka) later name: Saṃmitīya
    - Dharmottarīya
    - Bhadrayānīya
    - Sannāgarika
  - Vibhajjavāda (prior to 240 BCE; during Aśoka)
    - Theravāda (c. 240 BCE)
    - (Kāśyapīya (after 232 BCE)) (Note: According to Buswell and Lopez, the Kāśyapīya and Mahīśāsaka were offshoots of the Sarvastivadins, but are grouped under the Vibhajjavāda as "non-sarvastivada" groups.)
    - (Mahīśāsaka (after 232 BCE))
      - (Dharmaguptaka (after 232 BCE))
  - Sarvāstivāda (c. 237 BCE)
    - (Kāśyapīya (after 232 BCE))
    - (Mahīśāsaka (after 232 BCE))
      - (Dharmaguptaka (after 232 BCE))
    - Sautrāntika (between 50 BCE and c. 100 CE)
    - Mūlasarvāstivāda (3rd and 4th centuries)
    - Vaibhāṣika
- Mahāsāṃghika
  - Ekavyahārikas (during Aśoka)
    - Lokottaravāda
  - Gokulika (during Aśoka)
    - Bahuśrutīya (late third century BCE)
    - Prajñaptivāda (late third century BCE)
  - Caitika (mid-first century BCE)
    - Apara Śaila
    - Uttara Śaila

== Theravāda ==
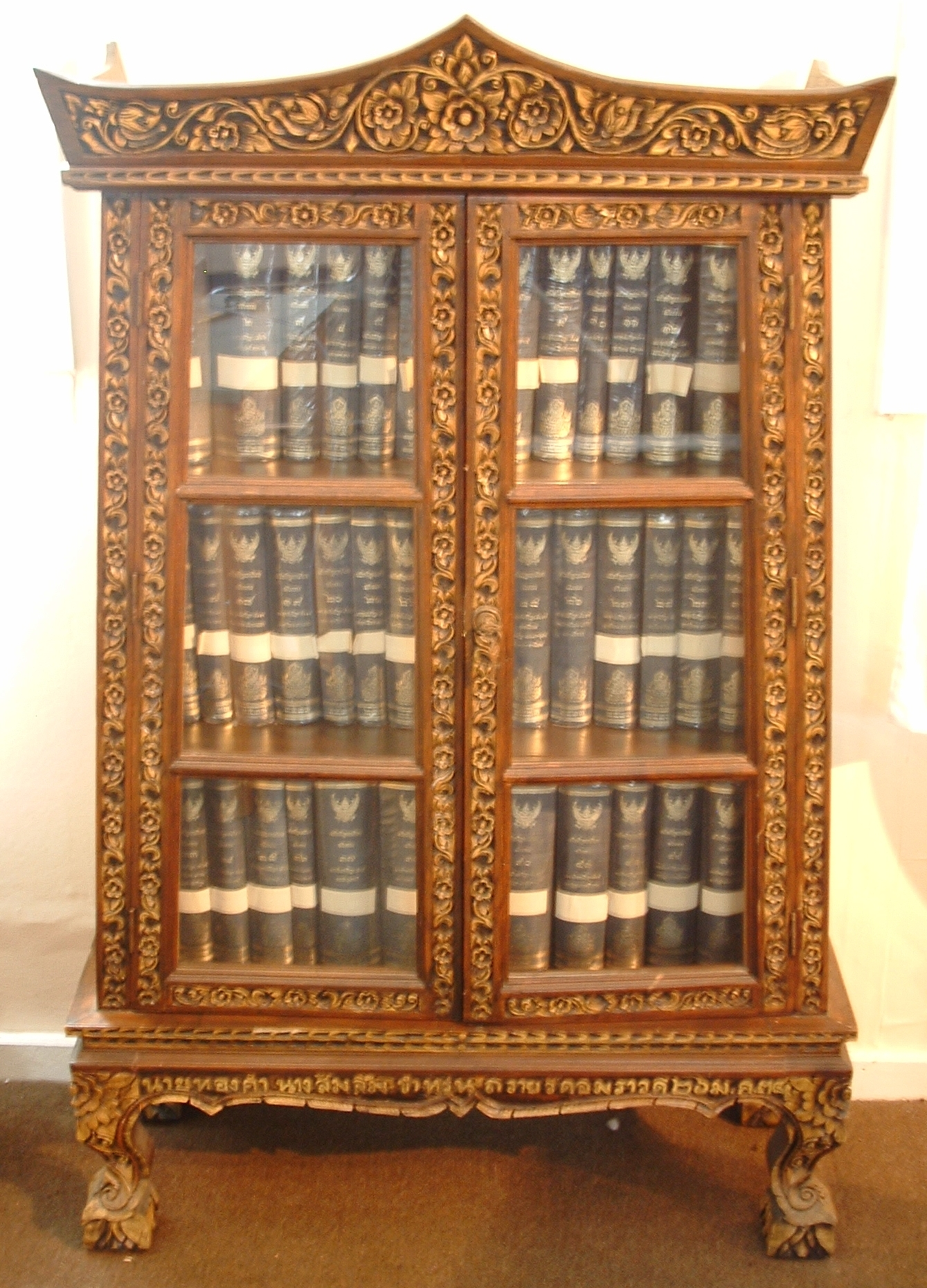
The Tipitaka (Pali Canon), in a Thai Style book case. The Pali Tipitaka is the doctrinal foundation of all major Theravāda sects today

Theravāda is the only extant mainstream non-Mahayana school. They are derived from the Sri Lankan Mahāvihāra sect, which was a branch of the South Indian Vibhajjavādins. Theravāda bases its doctrine on the Pāli Canon, the only complete Buddhist canon surviving in a classical Indian language. This language is Pāli, which serves as the school's sacred language and lingua franca.

The different sects and groups in Theravāda often emphasize different aspects (or parts) of the Pāli canon and the later commentaries (especially the very influential Visuddhimagga), or differ in the focus on and recommended way of practice. There are also significant differences in strictness or interpretation of the Vinaya Pitaka, the Theravādin Vinaya followed by monastics of this tradition.

The various divisions in Theravāda include:

- Indian Theravāda (mostly historical, although revived in the modern period partly through the Vipassana movement)
- Sri Lankan Theravāda
  - Amarapura–Rāmañña Nikāya
    - Delduwa
    - Kanduboda (or Swejin Nikaya)
    - Tapovana (or Kalyanavamsa)
    - Sri Lankan Forest Tradition
  - Siam Nikaya
    - Waturawila (or Mahavihara Vamshika Shyamopali Vanavasa Nikaya)
- Burmese Theravāda
  - Sudhammā Sect
    - Tai Zawti Sect
    - Khun/Tham Sect
    - Rāmañña Nikāya Sect
  - Shwegyin Sect a.k.a. Shwegyin Nikāya
    - Rāmañña Nikāya Sect
  - Dhammānudhamma Mahādvāra Nikāya Sect
  - Dhammavinayānuloma Mūladvāra Nikāya Sect
  - Anaukchaung Dvāra Sect
  - Catubhummika Mahāsatipaṭṭhana Hngettwin Sect
  - Veḷuvan Nikāya Sect
  - Gaṇavimut Kudo Sect
  - Dhammayutti Nikāya Mahāyin Sect
    - Rāmañña Nikāya Sect
- Thai Theravāda
  - Maha Nikaya
    - Dhammakaya Movement
    - Mahasati meditation (mindfulness meditation)
  - Thammayut Nikaya
    - Thai Forest Tradition, focused on monastic living in the wilderness
  - Santi Asoke, a recent reform movement
- Cambodian Theravāda
  - Maha Nikaya
  - Thammayut Nikaya
- Tantric Theravada, includes many esoteric elements not present in classic Theravāda
- Vietnamese Theravāda
- Laotian Theravāda
- Dai Theravāda in China
- Bangladeshi Theravāda
  - Sangharaj Nikaya
  - Mahasthabir Nikaya
- Nepalese Theravāda
  - Dharmodaya Sabha
- Vipassana movement, a strongly lay focused meditation based movement, popular in the West (where it is also known as "Insight Meditation")
- Western Theravāda Buddhism

== Mahāyāna schools ==
=== Indian Mahāyāna Buddhism ===
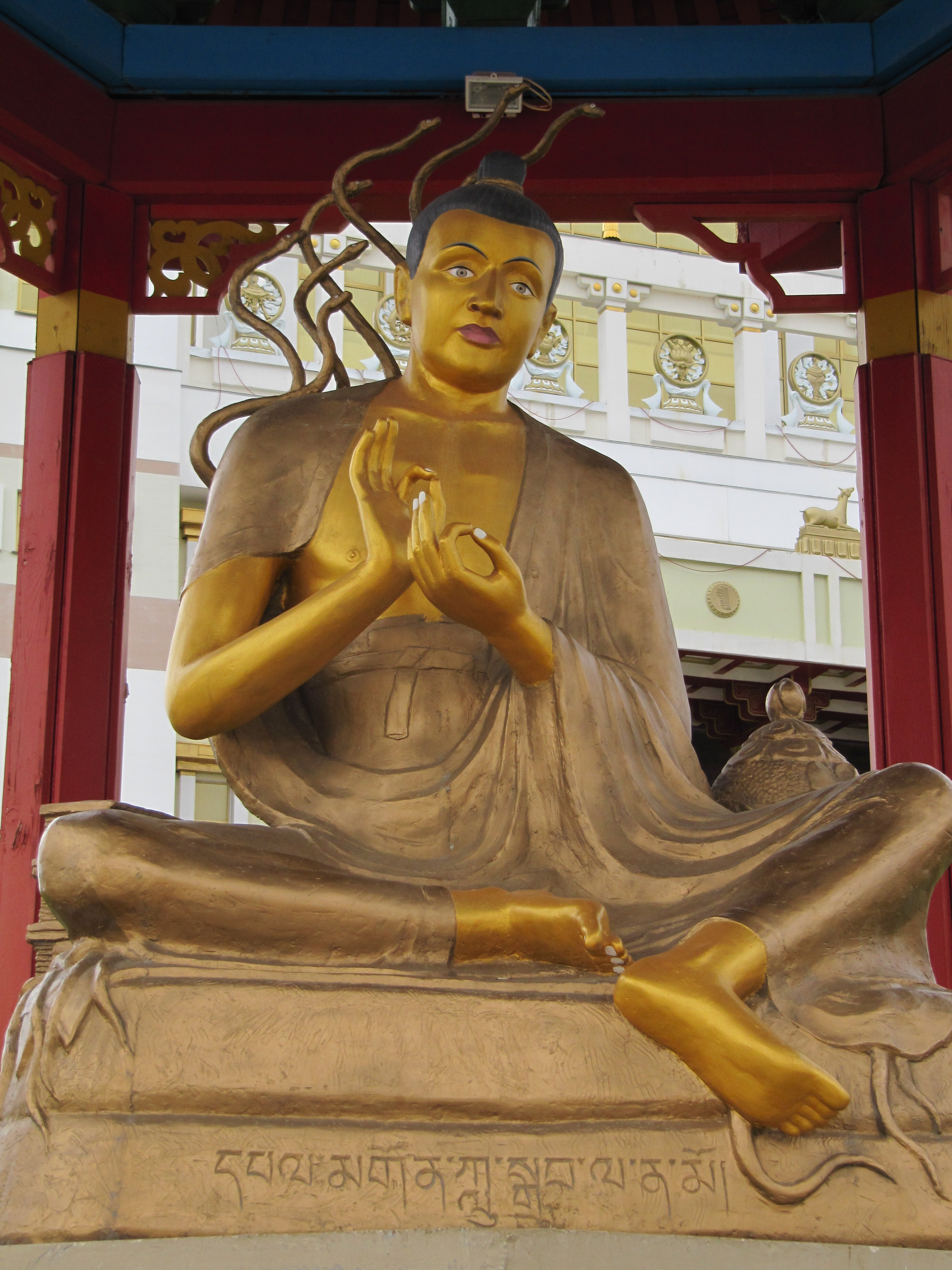
Nagarjuna, one of the most influential thinkers of Indian Mahāyāna Buddhism

Mahāyāna (Great Vehicle) Buddhism is a category of traditions which focuses on the bodhisattva path and affirms texts known as the Mahāyāna sutras. These texts are seen by modern scholars as dating as far back as the 1st century BCE. Unlike Theravada and other early schools, Mahāyāna schools generally hold that there are currently many Buddhas which are accessible in other realms or pure lands, and that they are transcendental or supramundane beings with vast powers.

Indian Mahāyāna Buddhism was varied, with many different groups in different geographical locations producing a wide variety of texts. As noted by travelers like Xuanzang, many Mahāyānists lived in mixed monasteries with non-Mahāyānists, but there were also specifically Mahāyāna monasteries. In Indian Buddhist scholasticism, there were two major traditions of Mahāyāna philosophy. The earliest was the Mādhyamaka ("Middle Way"), also known as the Śūnyavāda ("Emptiness-view"). This tradition followed the works of the philosopher Nāgārjuna (c. 150–c. 250 CE). Later Madhyamaka thinkers formed different schools of thought, including the Svatantrika (following Bhāviveka), the Prasangika (which follows Chandrakirti) and the Yogācāra-Madhyamaka. The other major school of Indian Mahayana was the Yogācāra ("yoga practice") school, also known as the Vijñānavāda ("the doctrine of consciousness"), Vijñaptivāda ("the doctrine of ideas or percepts"), or Cittamātra ("mind-only") school, founded by Asanga and Vasubandhu in the 4th century AD.

Some scholars also note that the compilers of the Tathāgatagarbha texts constitute a third "school" of Indian Mahāyāna. This movement heavily influenced East Asian and Tibetan Mahayana schools such as the Dashabhumika, Huayan, Tiantai, Jonang, Nichiren and Zen sects, as did both Madhyamaka and Yogacara.

=== East Asian Mahayana ===
East Asian Buddhism or East Asian Mahāyāna refers to the schools that developed in East Asia and use the Chinese Buddhist canon. It is a major religion in China, Japan, Taiwan, Vietnam, Korea, Malaysia and Singapore. East Asian Buddhists constitute the largest body of Buddhist traditions in the world, numbering over half of the world's Buddhists.

East Asian Mahāyāna began to develop in China during the Han dynasty (when Buddhism was first introduced from Central Asia). It is thus influenced by Chinese culture and philosophy. East Asian Mahāyāna developed new, uniquely Asian interpretations of Buddhist texts and focused on the study of Mahāyāna Sutras as well as on the writings of East Asian masters like Zhiyi, Fazang and Linji.

East Asian Buddhist monastics generally follow the Dharmaguptaka Vinaya.

==== Main sects ====
- Chinese Buddhism (Buddhism in contemporary China is characterized by institutional fluidity between schools)
  - Jingtu (Pure Land)
  - Guanyin Buddhism (Syncretized with Chinese folk religion and Taoism)
  - Lüzong (Vinaya school)
  - Chengshi (Satyasiddhi, historical)
  - Kosa (Abhidharmakośa, historical)
  - Sanlun ("Three Treatises" school, Mādhyamaka)
  - Weishi or Faxiang school (Yogācāra, historical)
  - Shelun (based on Asanga’s Summary of the Mahayana, historical)
  - Niepan (Tathagatagarbha — based on the Nirvana Sutra, historical)
  - Dilun (Daśabhūmikā — absorbed into Huayan)
  - Tiantai (Lotus school)
  - Huayan (Avatamsaka school)
  - Chan (Zen)
    - Sanjiejiao (historical)
    - Oxhead school (historical)
    - East Mountain Teaching (historical)
      - Heze school (historical)
      - Hongzhou school (historical)
      - Five Houses of Chán
        - Caodong school
        - Fayan school (absorbed into Linji school)
        - Guiyang school
        - Linji school
        - Yunmen school (absorbed into Linji school)
      - Humanistic Buddhism (modern)
        - Chung Tai Shan
        - Dharma Drum Mountain
        - Fo Guang Shan
        - Tzu Chi
      - Tibetan Chan (historical)
  - Zhenyan ("True Word", Esoteric Buddhism)
- Vietnamese Buddhism (Traditions are generally syncretized in Vietnam, rather than existing as distinct schools)
  - Tịnh Độ (Pure Land)
  - Thiên Thai (Tiantai)
  - Hoa Nghiêm (Huayen)
  - Thiền (Zen)
    - Vinītaruci (historical)
    - Vô Ngôn Thông (historical)
    - Thảo Đường (Yunmen school, historical)
    - Lâm Tế (Linji school)
      - Liễu Quán
    - Tào Động (Caodong school)
    - Trúc Lâm (Syncretized with Taoism, Vietnamese folk religion and Confucianism)
    - Plum Village Tradition (Engaged Buddhism)
      - Order of Interbeing
  - Đạo Bửu Sơn Kỳ Hương (Millenarian movement)
    - Tứ Ân Hiếu Nghĩa (Reformist movement)
    - Hòa Hảo (Reformist movement)
  - Đạo Phật Khất sĩ Việt Nam (vi)
  - Minh Sư Đạo (syncretized with Theravada Buddhism, Confucianism and Taoism)
  - Minh Lý Đạo (syncretized with Confucianism and Taoism)
  - Đo Cư Sĩ Phật Hội
- Śaiva-Mahayana in Southeast Asia (historical, syncretized with Hinduism)
- Korean Buddhism
  - Tongbulgyo (Interpenetrated Buddhism – including Jeongto, or Pure Land)
  - Gyeyul (Vinaya school — historical)
  - Samnon (Mādhyamaka — historical)
  - Beopsang (Yogācāra — historical)
  - Yeolban (Nirvana — historical)
  - Wonyung (Avatamsaka — historical)
  - Cheontae (Tiantai)
  - Hwaeom (Huayen — absorbed into Jogye Order)
  - Seon (Zen)
    - Nine mountain schools (historical)
    - Jogye Order
      - Kwan Um School of Zen
    - Taego Order
  - Wonbulgyo (Korean Reformed Buddhism)
  - Jingak Order (Shingon syncretized with Humanistic Buddhism)
- Japanese Buddhism
  - Nara period schools
    - Risshū (Vinaya school)
    - Jojitsu (Satyasiddhi – historical, syncretized with Sanron)
    - Kusha (Abhidharmakośa – historical, syncretized with Hossō)
    - Sanron (Mādhyamaka – historical)
    - Hossō (Yogācāra)
    - Kegon (Huayen syncretized with Shingon)
  - Heian period schools (Esoteric)
    - Tendai (Tiantai syncretized with Zhenyan, Jingtu, Lüzong and Oxhead school)
    - Shingon (Zhenyan)
      - Kōyasan Shingon-shū
      - Shingon Risshu (Syncretized with Risshū)
      - Shingon-shu Buzan-ha
      - Shingon-shū Chizan-ha
      - Shinnyo-en
    - Shugendo (Syncretized with Shinto, Taoism and Onmyōdō)
  - Kamakura period schools
    - Zen (Chan)
      - Rinzai (Linji school)
        - Fuke-shū (Historical)
        - Myōshin-ji
          - Ichibata Yakushi Kyodan
      - Sōtō (Caodong school)
      - Ōbaku (Linji school syncretized with Jingtu)
      - Sanbo Kyodan (Sōtō syncretized with Rinzai)
        - White Plum Asanga
          - Ordinary Mind Zen School
          - Zen Peacemakers
    - Pure Land
      - Jōdo-shū
        - Chinzei
        - Seizan
        - Shōgyōhongangi
        - Tanengi
        - Ichinengi
      - Jōdo Shinshū
        - Hongan-ji
          - Hongwanji-ha
            - Nishi Hongan-ji
          - Ōtani-ha
            - Higashi Hongan-ji
              - Dobokai
        - Ikkō-shū
          - Kakure nenbutsu
      - Ji-shū
      - Yūzū-nembutsu-shū
    - Nichiren Buddhism
      - Nichiren Shū
      - Honmon Butsuryū-shū
      - Kempon Hokke
      - Nichiren Shōshū
- Western Mahāyāna Buddhism
  - Zen in the United States

== Esoteric schools ==
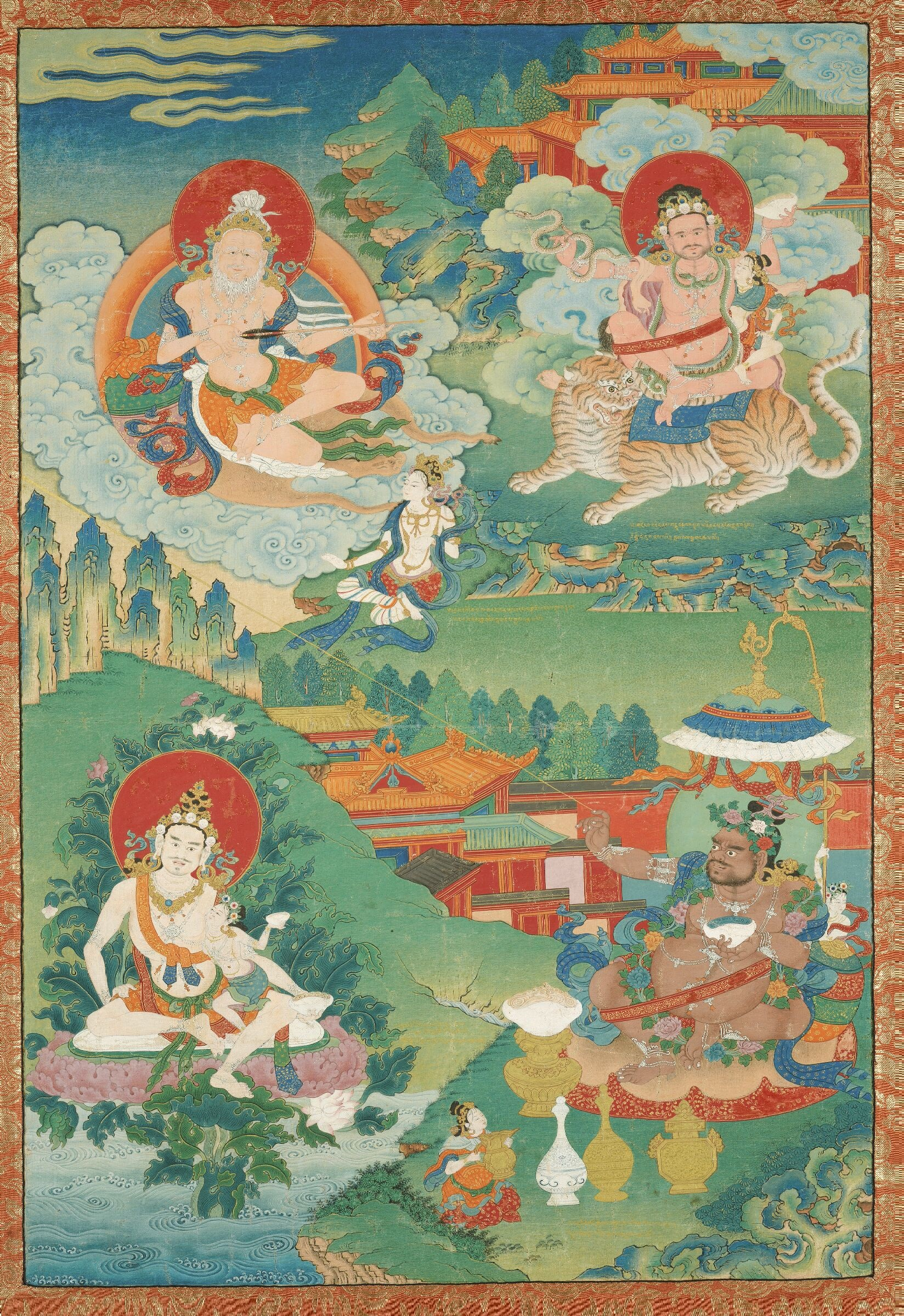
Indian Buddhist Mahasiddhas, 18th century, Boston MFA.

Esoteric Buddhism, also known as Vajrayāna, Mantrayāna, Tantrayāna, Secret Mantra (Guhyamantra), and Tantric Buddhism is often placed in a separate category by scholars due to its unique tantric features and elements (instead of being grouped as part of Mahayana school). Esoteric Buddhism arose and developed in medieval India among esoteric adepts known as Mahāsiddhas. Esoteric Buddhism maintains its own set of texts alongside the classic scriptures, these esoteric works are known as the Buddhist Tantras. It includes practices that make use of mantras, dharanis, mudras, mandalas and the visualization of deities and Buddhas.

Main Esoteric Buddhist traditions include:

- Indian Esoteric Buddhism (Historical)
- Nepalese Esoteric Buddhism
- Ari Buddhism (Historical)
- Tantric Theravada
- Indonesian Esoteric Buddhism
- Philippine Esoteric Buddhism
- Azhaliism
- Tibetan Buddhism, the most widespread of these traditions, is practiced in Tibet, Mongolia, Inner Mongolia and few other parts of China, parts of Nepal, North India (incl. Sikkhim) and Siberia, Bhutan. Monastics of this tradition generally follow the Mulasarvastivada Vinaya.
  - Nyingma
  - Bön (Indigenous, often considered "pre-Buddhist" in origin)
  - Kadam (Historical)
    - Gelug
      - Foundation for the Preservation of the Mahayana Tradition
      - New Kadampa Tradition
  - Kagyu
    - Dagpo Kagyu
      - Karma Kagyu
        - Diamond Way
        - Shambhala Buddhism
      - Phagdru Kagyu
        - Drikung Kagyu
        - Drukpa Kagyu
      - Taklung Kagyu
    - Shangpa Kagyu
  - Sakya
  - Bodong
  - Jonang
  - Tibetan Pure Land
  - Rimé movement (Non-sectarian)
  - Mongolian Buddhism
    - Siberian Buddhism
    - Kalmyk Buddhism
    - Buryat Buddhism
    - Tuvan Buddhism
  - Bhutanese Buddhism
  - Indian Tibetan Buddhism
- Newar Buddhism (Nepal)
- Chinese Esoteric Buddhism (zhenyan, 真言)
  - True Buddha School
- Korean Esoteric Buddhism (milgyo, 密教)
  - Jingak Order (Shingon syncretized with Humanistic Buddhism)
- Japanese Esoteric Buddhism (mikkyō, 密教)
  - Tendai (Zhenyan syncretized with Tiantai, Jingtu, Lüzong and Oxhead school)
  - Shingon (Zhenyan)
    - Kōyasan Shingon-shū
    - Shingon Risshu (Syncretized with Risshū)
    - Shingon-shu Buzan-ha
    - Shingon-shū Chizan-ha
    - Shinnyo-en
  - Shugendo (Syncretized with Shinto, Taoism and Onmyōdō)
  - Kegon (Huayan syncretized with Shingon)
- Western Vajrayāna Buddhism
  - Aro gTér (Western Dzogchen-centering ngakpa–ngakma (householder, non-monastic) derivative lineage of Nyingma sect of Tibetan (Vajrayana) Buddhism, founded by German-British convert, Dzogchenpa, tertön, and tulku Ngakpa Chögyam, who established Aro in the 1980s with the approval and blessing of Dudjom Rinpoche)

== New Buddhist movements ==
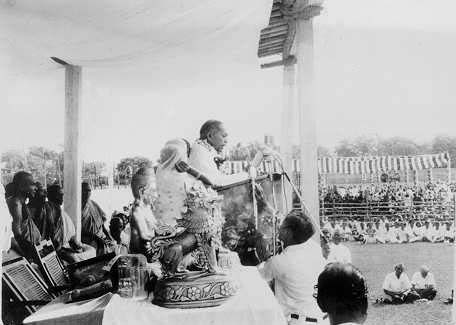
B. R. Ambedkar delivering speech during conversion, Deekshabhoomi, Nagpur, 14 October 1956

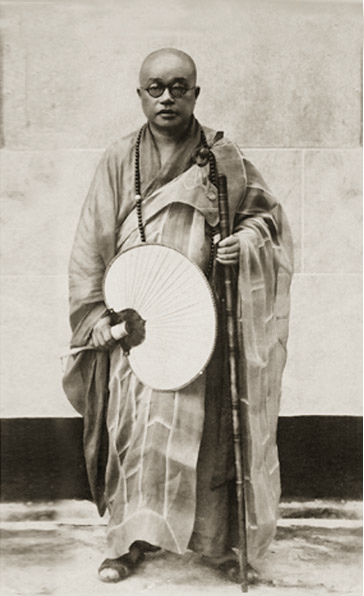
Taixu, the founder of Chinese Humanistic Buddhism

Two examples of some of the most significant and popular major new Buddhist movements are:

• Navayana ("New Way"), also known as Dalit Buddhist movement or "Ambedkarite" Buddhism, developed by B. R. Ambedkar based on the idea of “Implementing the Principles of Buddhism for the Welfare of Many People.”

• Hoa Hao is a Vietnamese Buddhist reform movement founded in 1939 by Huynh Phu So in the Mekong Delta, claiming to follow the true teachings of Buddha to improve oneself, attain liberation from the cycle of reincarnation and ascend to the Pure Land of Ultimate Bliss.

Various other Buddhist new religious movements arose in the 20th century, including the following:

- Agon Shu
- Aum Shinrikyo
- Buddhist modernism
  - Buddhist feminism
  - Buddhist fundamentalism
  - Buddhist socialism
  - Critical Buddhism
  - Protestant Buddhism
  - Secular Buddhism
- Coconut Religion
- Dhammakaya Movement
- Diamond Way
- Dobokai
- Engaged Buddhism
  - Buddhist Peace Fellowship
  - Plum Village Tradition
    - Order of Interbeing
  - Sarvodaya Shramadana Movement
- Foundation for the Preservation of the Mahayana Tradition (FPMT)
- Gedatsukai
  - Gedatsu Church of America
- Guanyin Famen
- Ho No Hana
- Humanistic Buddhism
  - Chung Tai Shan
  - Dharma Drum Mountain
  - Fo Guang Shan
  - Tzu Chi
- Jingak Order
- Kwan Um School of Zen
- New Kadampa Tradition
- Nichiren-based modern lay movements
  - Nichirenism
    - Kenshōkai
    - Kokuchūkai
  - Nipponzan Myōhōji
  - Reiyūkai
    - Bussho Gonenkai Kyōdan
    - Myōchikai Kyōdan
    - Myōdōkai Kyōdan
    - Risshō Kōsei Kai
  - Shōshinkai
  - Sōka Gakkai
  - Youth League for Revitalizing Buddhism
- PL Kyodan
- Rimé movement
- Rulaizong
- Sanbo Kyodan
  - White Plum Asanga
    - Ordinary Mind Zen School
    - Zen Peacemakers
- Santi Asoke
- Shambhala Buddhism
- Share International
- Shinnyo-en
- Triratna Buddhist Community
- True Buddha School
- Vipassana movement
- Western Buddhism
  - Buddhism in Australia
  - Buddhism in Europe
    - Buddhism in Austria
    - Buddhism in Denmark
    - Buddhism in Italy
    - Buddhism in Russia
    - Buddhism in Slovenia
    - Buddhism in the United Kingdom
  - Buddhism in the United States
    - Zen in the United States
- Won Buddhism

== See also ==
- Buddha-nature School
- History of Buddhism
- Buddhist councils
- Gandhāran Buddhist texts
- Index of Buddhism-related articles
- Buddhist sects in Myanmar
- Southern, Eastern and Northern Buddhism
- Perfection of Wisdom School
