= Nikkyō Niwano =

Japanese Buddhist leader

Nikkyō Niwano KCSG
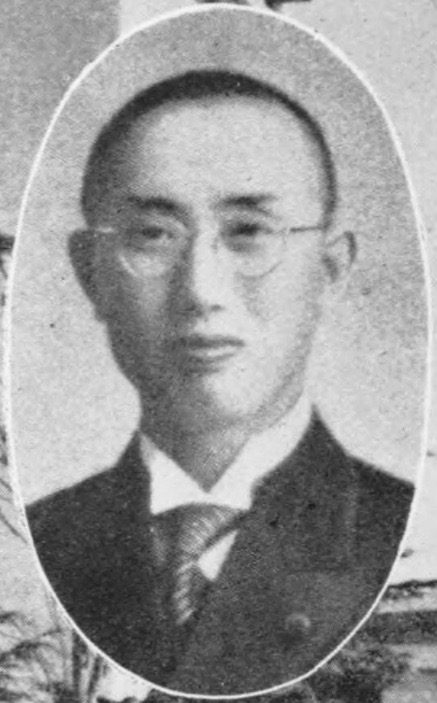

1st President of Risshō Kōsei Kai (RKK)

Great Teacher of the One Vehicle
- In office March 5, 1939 – November 15, 1991
- Preceded by: Office created
- Succeeded by: Nichiko Niwano

Personal details
- Born: November 15, 1906 Niigata Prefecture, Japan
- Died: October 4, 1999 (aged 92)
- Spouse: Sai Niwano
- Children: Nichiko Niwano (son)
- Relatives: Kosho Niwano (Granddaughter)
- Known for: Religious work, founder of Risshō Kōsei Kai
- Awards: Templeton Foundation Prize for Progress in Religion – 1979; Knight Commander with the Silver Star – 1992; Interfaith Medallion – 1993
- Website: Risshō Kōsei Kai

Nikkyō Niwano KCSG (庭野日敬, Niwano Nikkyō; November 15, 1906 – October 4, 1999) was one of the founders and the first president of the Buddhist organization Risshō Kōsei Kai.

== Early life ==
Born on November 15, 1906, to farmers, Nikkyō had a humble life in a small town. Later in his youth, he moved to Tokyo to work, where he began to study several different religions. During his studies, he attended a sermon on the Lotus Sutra and became a Buddhist.

== Risshō Kōsei Kai ==
Niwano had been actively involved with the Buddhist group Reiyūkai, and it was then that he encountered Myoko Naganuma and led her to convert to Reiyūkai. In 1938 they both attended a leaders meeting where the leadership of Reiyūkai made several comments stating that the Lotus Sutra was outdated. After discussing this matter with each other, they decided that they could not belong to an organization which held this type of view. On March 5, 1938, they founded Risshō Kōsei Kai, holding the first meeting in Niwano's house.

Niwano was to be the President and Naganuma to be the vice-president. As the organization grew he gave up his job as a milkman and devoted himself full-time to the ministry. He became involved in interfaith activities and helped to found the World Conference of Religions for Peace in 1970. During this time he became involved in numerous religious and cultural conferences and gatherings, some of which include the Asian Conference on Religion and Peace and the 6th WCRP in Italy, where he presided over the WCRP alongside Pope John Paul II. He also spoke on several occasions as the United Nations calling for world peace and the abolition of nuclear arms.

In 1991 he stepped down as president and was succeeded by his eldest son, Nichiko Niwano. Although retired, he continued to participate in interfaith and peace activities.

== Awards ==
In 1979 Niwano was awarded the Templeton Foundation Prize for Progress in Religion. In 1992 he was made a Knight Commander with the Silver Star of the Order of St. Gregory the Great by the Vatican.

In 1993 Niwano was awarded the Interfaith Medallion from the International Council of Christians and Jews.

Author Daniel Montgomery writes that "no Buddhist leader in the World has become more widely known or showered with honours than him."

== Death and legacy ==
Nikkyo Niwano died on October 4, 1999. He was cremated and some of his ashes were placed in the Precious Stupa of the One Vehicle, a small stupa located on the grounds of the group's headquarters.

== Works ==
- Nikkyō Niwano (1980). Buddhism for Today, A Modern Interpretation of the Threefold Lotus Sutra, Kosei Publishing Co/Weatherhill Inc; ISBN 0834801477
- Nikkyō Niwano (1989). A Guide to the Threefold Lotus Sutra, Kosei Publishing Co. ISBN 433301025X
- Nikkyō Niwano (1978). Lifetime Beginner: An Autobiography, Kosei Publishing Co. ISBN 4333003369
- Nikkyō Niwano (1995). Invisible Eyelashes: Seeing What is Closest to Us, Kosei Publishing Co. ISBN 4333016819

Buddhist titles
Preceded by None	Director General Rissho Kosei-kai; March 5, 1938–March 28, 1943	Succeeded by Himself as President
Preceded by none	President of Rissho Kosei-kai; March 28, 1943–November 15, 1991	Succeeded by Nichiko Niwano
