= Myōkō Naganuma =

- Born: Masa Naganuma; December 25, 1889; Saitama Prefecture, Japan
- Died: September 10, 1957 (aged 67)
- Occupation: Vice-President of Risshō Kōsei Kai
- Known for: Religious work
- Title: Co-Founder Myoko, Great Bodhisattva of Compassion
- Term: 1943-1957
- Predecessor: None
- Successor: Rev. Nichiko Niwano

Myōkō Naganuma (長沼妙佼, Naganuma Myōkō; 1889–1957) was the co-founder and first vice-president of the Buddhist religious sect Risshō Kōsei Kai.

== Early life ==
She was born as Masa Naganuma on December 25, 1889, in Saitama Prefecture, Japan. At the age of sixteen she was adopted by her older sister, but soon left for Tokyo. In Tokyo she found work as a maid, but later worked in an army munitions factory. Soon she fell ill and went to live with her uncle in the country. She later married and had a daughter, but the child died at age two. Myoko divorced her husband because he mishandled their money and moved back to Tokyo. In Tokyo she married again and opened a food stand to make money, selling ice and sweet baked potatoes. She fell ill very often and hemorrhaged many times. It was at this time she encountered Mr. Nikkyō Niwano and he began to give religious guidance to her. Her second husband however, was unable to deal with her new beliefs and soon left her. He would later marry a member of Risshō Kōsei Kai and receive guidance from Ms. Naganuma.

== Involvement in Risshō Kōsei Kai ==
Ms. Naganuma had met Mr. Nikkyō Niwano because he delivered milk to her house. At this time she was sickly and he encouraged her to put faith in the teachings of the Lotus Sutra and to practice Reiyūkai Buddhism. She did and her health improved, after this she began to work with Mr. Niwano in the missionary field. The two became close friends, despite the age difference between the two, Ms. Naganuma being seventeen years his senior. In 1938 the two attended a Reiyūkai meeting where the leadership made comments about the Lotus Sutra being outdated. Both agreed that they could not belong to a group that held such views. They decided to found Risshō Kōsei Kai and on March 5, 1938, held the founding meeting at Mr. Niwano's house. She became the vice-president and was known for being able to receive messages from the spirit world and being very devoted to the faith. She supported Rev. Niwano and Risshō Kōsei Kai, traveling with him and giving guidance to members.

== Illness, Death and legacy ==
In later years her health worsened. She developed cataracts to the point of nearly being blind. She would also be bedridden for weeks on end. Then, in 1948 she received an operation on for breast cancer.

In 1957 she fell extremely ill to the point that she was unable to sleep at night without injections, however her veins soon hardened, making it very difficult for her to receive them.

All the while she continued to widely travel around Japan visiting branches and giving guidance to members. Mr. Niwano reduced his activities as president and was with her during her final days. Shortly before her death, she suffered from a blood clot in the brain and never recovered.

Mrs. Naganuma died on September 10, 1957, and was buried at Kosei Cemetery. At her funeral thousands of members came to pay their respects. In honor of her the ideogram for "Ko" in Kosei was changed to that of "ko" in Myoko. She is still highly regarded and respected by members of Risshō Kōsei Kai and her picture, along with that of Nikkyō Niwano, appears by every church altar. In 2000 Nichiko Niwano, the current leader of Risshō Kōsei Kai, granted her the posthumous title "Great Bodhisattva of Compassion".

== Websites ==
- Official Profile
- Official English Site of Rissho Kosei-kai

== Notes ==
Preceded by none	1st Deputy Director General of Rissho Kosei-kai; March 5, 1938–March 28, 1943	Succeeded by herself as Vice-President

Preceded by none	1st Vice-President of Rissho Kosei-kai; March 28, 1943–September 10, 1957	Succeeded by Nichiko Niwano
