= Southern, Eastern and Northern Buddhism =

Buddhist branches in Asia by region

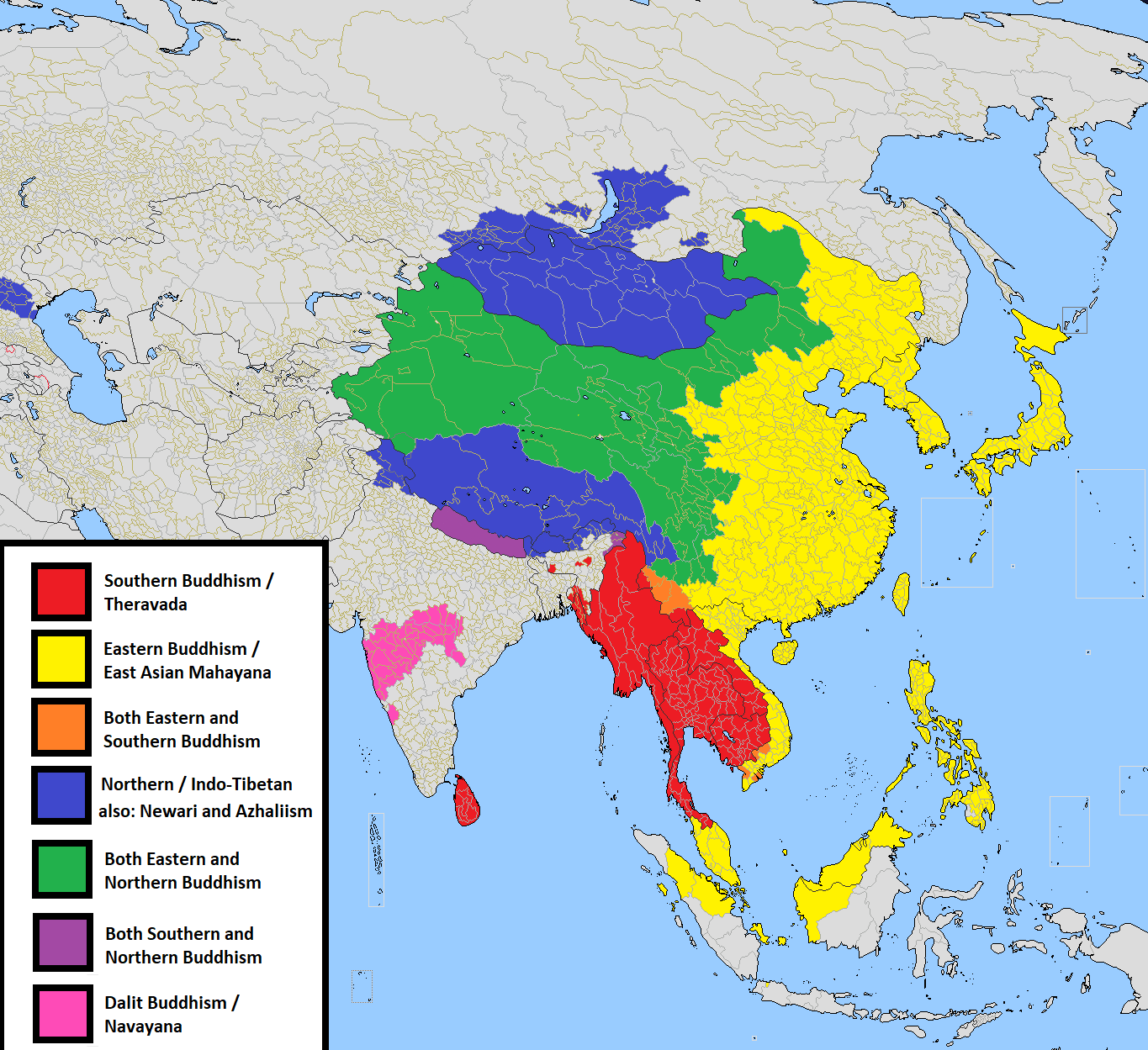
Northern Buddhism: Blue (Vajrayana) Eastern Buddhism: Yellow (Mahayana) Southern Buddhism: Red (Theravada)

Southern Buddhism, Eastern Buddhism, and Northern Buddhism are geographical terms sometimes used to describe the three main schools of Buddhism: Theravāda, Mahāyāna, and Vajrayāna. Buddhism is an Indian religion and dhārma that encompasses a variety of traditions, beliefs, and spiritual practices based on teachings attributed to Gautama Buddha (5th century BCE), but diversified since then in a wide variety of schools and traditions. Buddhism originated in ancient India, from where the Buddhadhārma spread from the northeastern region of the Indian subcontinent throughout Central Asia, East Asia, Mainland Southeast Asia, and Maritime Southeast Asia.

== Southern Buddhism ==
"Southern Buddhism" refers to the traditions of Buddhism that were established in India, Sri Lanka, and countries in Mainland and Maritime Southeast Asia, especially Cambodia, Indonesia, Laos, Myanmar (Burma), Thailand, and Vietnam. Southern Buddhists are primarily connected by their strict adherence to the Pāli Canon, monasticism and its prevalent monastic rules, meditation, and ritual practices. Southern Buddhism tends to be in agreement that the canonical Pāli scriptures and commentaries are considered its textual authority, and a strong monastic tradition along with asceticism, celibacy, and the practice of renunciation (considered the best way to live one's life) allows its adherents to disregard worldly concerns and devote all of their attention to meditative techniques and religious practices alone in order to achieve liberation. It is usually considered to be synonymous with Theravāda Buddhism.

Buddhists in this region place their trust in the Triple Gem: Buddha, Dharma, and Saṃgha, and is of utmost important in order to seek refuge to the Triple Gem for conducting a Buddhist way of life. The Saṃgha includes both ordained nuns and lay supporters of the monastic community while referring to the overall body of the spiritually advanced community. However, monks are predominately the symbol of the Saṃgha and worship. Ranking for the Saṃgha is based on seniority by the time of entry and gender, while many decisions are made ideally by consensus within the monastic community.

The monastic orders of Southern Buddhism are characterized by a strict rule of celibacy, detachment, and monastic discipline. There are two distinctions of monastic members within the Saṃgha: those whose primary duty are the Buddhist sacred scriptures, where they would be a resident in a monastic institution intending to study, preserve, and teach the traditions that are passed down to the next generations; whereas those whose primary duty is meditation would instead focus on the path to liberation by gaining insight and realizations on the true nature of reality, often through reclusive forest retreats, in order to achieve nirvāṇa. The monastic community is an important social institution that provides education and social mobility for the bright and ambitious.

== Northern Buddhism ==
"Northern Buddhism" sometimes refers to Buddhism as practiced in East Asia and the Tibetan Plateau, particularly Bhutan, China, Japan, Korea, Mongolia, Nepal, Taiwan, Tibet, and Vietnam, and formerly in medieval India before the decline of Buddhism in the Indian subcontinent. It is often held to be synonymous with Mahāyāna Buddhism. However, the term Northern Buddhism is also sometimes used to refer specifically to Tibetan (including Mongolian) Buddhism. In this terminology, the traditions of Buddhism that were established in China, Japan, Korea etc. are collectively referred to as "Eastern Buddhism". (Note: This system is used in the New Penguin Handbook of Living Religions) The Brill Dictionary of Religion (Note: Article on Buddhism) uses the term "Northern Buddhism" in a sense exclusive of Vajrayāna Buddhism.

In pre-sectarian Buddhism, doctrinal variations did not necessarily imply separate organizations, so the Mahāyāna movement spread within rather than institutionally separating itself from the early monastic orders. The same is generally true of Tibetan Buddhist monasticism; the monastic code followed is that of the Mūlasarvastivāda, an ancient Indian order of Buddhist monks. Tibetan Buddhists also share tantric practices and perspectives belonging to both Mahāyāna and Vajrayāna branches of Buddhism, while they are divided into monastic orders are loosely organized schools based on different lineages of teachers and not, in most cases, on strictly doctrinal differences.

Additionally, the main four traditions of Tibetan Buddhism are Kagyu (bka' brgyud), Sakya (sa skya'), Nyingma (rnying ma), and Geluk (dge lugs), but each of these major schools contains groupings within it, which may be to a greater or lesser extent autonomous. Certain doctrinal positions or specialisms in specific practices are associated with each school, but just as in the ancient Buddhist orders, there are no rigid sectarian boundaries. The Buddhism of this branch derives from later Indian Buddhism, especially of the Pāla dynasty (ruling over Bengal, Bihar from the 8th to 12th centuries CE), incorporating Buddhist monastic scholarship, Mahāyāna philosophy, and tantric traditions. It preserves large collections of scriptural and commentarial Buddhist texts in Tibetan language, including a comprehensive set of translations from Sanskrit literary sources as well as a vast indigenous literature.

== Mahayana and Theravada in Asia ==
The use and meaning of these terms reflects only the contemporary situation of the various schools of Buddhism in Asia, and even that only imperfectly. While the Theravada presently dominates in Southeast Asia, prior to the 13th century the Mahayana was also well established in that region. The survival of certain Mahayana notions in popular Southeast Asian Buddhism (such as the worship of Lokesvara- a form of Avalokitesvara- in Thailand) reflect the early presence of Mahayana ideology in the "Southern Buddhist" world. Ongoing contact between Southeast Asia and India brought a variety of doctrines, relics, and texts into Southeast Asia from both the Mahayana and Vajrayana traditions, as well as the Theravada and the other early Buddhist schools. Only after the decline of Buddhism in India did Theravada Buddhism begin to dominate in Southeast Asia, with Theravada-dominated Sri Lanka replacing India as the source of new texts and teachers.

The historical evidence for the cohabitation of Mahayana and non-Mahayana monks in some South Asian monasteries during the spread of Buddhism from India to East Asia provides additional evidence that the form of Buddhism practiced in the "Northern" territories likely retains many non-Mahayana influences. Furthermore, in certain regions of China and East Asia (notably in Southern China), non-Mahayana forms of Buddhism were sometimes dominant.

Vietnam represents an interesting case of a country lying in the liminal region between the Northern and Southern Buddhist schools. As might be expected, Vietnamese Buddhism shows both a strong Mahayana and Theravada influence.

== See also ==
- Indosphere
  - Sanskritisation's key drivers
  - Greater India, Indian sphere of cultural influence
  - History of Indian influence on Southeast Asia
  - Indianisation, in wider global historic and contemporary context
  - Sanskrit-related topics
  - Mandala, a political model which was key driver of Indosphere
- Other related
  - Indian honorifics, influenced the Malaysian, Thai, Filipino and Indonesian honorifics
  - Indian Diaspora, ancient (PIO) and current (NRI)
  - Siam Devadhiraj
- Sinosphere
