= Nichiko Niwano =

Japanese Buddhist leader

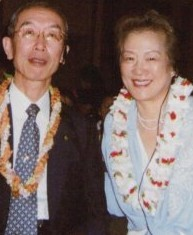
- Rev. Niwano and Mrs. Niwano in 2008
- Born: March 20, 1938 (age 88); Japan
- Education: Rissho University
- Occupation: President of Rissho Kosei-kai
- Known for: Leader of Rissho Kosei-kai
- Term: November 15, 1991-Present
- Predecessor: Nikkyō Niwano
- Successor: Kosho Niwano (designated successor)
- Spouse: Ayako Kakeba Niwano
- Children: 4 daughters
- Parents: Nikkyō Niwano (father); Sai Niwano (mother)

Nichiko Niwano (庭野日鑛, Niwano Nichiko; born 1938) is the eldest son of Risshō Kōsei Kai founder Nikkyō Niwano, and the current President of Risshō Kōsei Kai.

== Early life ==
Nichiko was born on March 20, 1938, to Nikkyō Niwano and his wife Naoko, just a few weeks after his father had founded Risshō Kōsei Kai.

In 1958, Nichiko was enrolled in the Faculty of Buddhist Studies at Rissho University. In 1960, he was named the successor to his father.

After Nichiko graduated from the university's Graduate School in 1968, he was appointed head of the Dissemination Department and president of the Risshō Kōsei Kai seminary.

In 1967, he married Ayako Kakeba. They have four daughters.

== Presidency ==
In 1960, he was chosen to succeed his father as president. He did so on his father's 85th birthday, November 15, 1991. Since his inauguration, he has overseen the expansion of Risshō Kōsei Kai.

He travels to various Risshō Kōsei Kai centers in Japan and other nations, delivering lectures and sermons. He has written several books, including My Father, My Teacher (1989), The Inward Path (1990), and Modern Meditations (1991).

He teaches members that they should become aware of the value and wonder of life.

He continued his father's legacy of interfaith work and is currently serving as President of the World Conference of Religions for Peace and as Chairman of Shinshuren. He regularly attends interfaith gatherings.

== Quotes ==
- "Self-obsessed, filled with desire, driven by ego needs, we lose sight of the most beautiful things in life."
- "We tend to judge others on the basis of prejudice, emotion, or self-interest."
- "Modern society demands quick results, which diminishes our ability to persevere and to tolerate hardship."
- "Excessive reliance on modern conveniences makes people less tolerant of delays or difficulties. Patience is a virtue we should strive to acquire."
- "We are not born into this world through our own efforts. Our parents are the direct cause of our birth. If we pursue the matter further, we realize that we have received life through the supreme activity of the fundamental power of the universe. Nevertheless, we tend to think we have come as far as we have in life through our own efforts. As long as we are convinced of that, it is difficult for us to feel humble; but such thinking is shallow and lazy."
- "We are grateful for everything–for each day we live, for life itself. There is no greater privilege than being born human. Unfortunately, we usually forget this."
- "The first principle of Buddhism is to revere with a warm heart and a flexible mind all things that have life. For that, it is essential to recognize the truth of transience."

== Books ==
- My Father, My Teacher: A Spiritual Journey (1989)
- Modern Meditations: A Buddhist Sampler (1991)
- Cultivating the Buddhist Heart: How to Find Peace and Fulfillment in a Changing World (2008)

Buddhist titles
Preceded by Nikkyo Niwano	2nd President of Rissho Kosei-kai; November 15, 1991–Current	Succeeded by Incumbent
Preceded by Myoko Naganuma	2nd Vice President of Rissho Kosei-kai; 1960–1991	Succeeded by Kosho Niwano
