= Bussho Gonenkai Kyōdan =

Offshoot of Reiyūkai and branch of Nichiren Buddhism

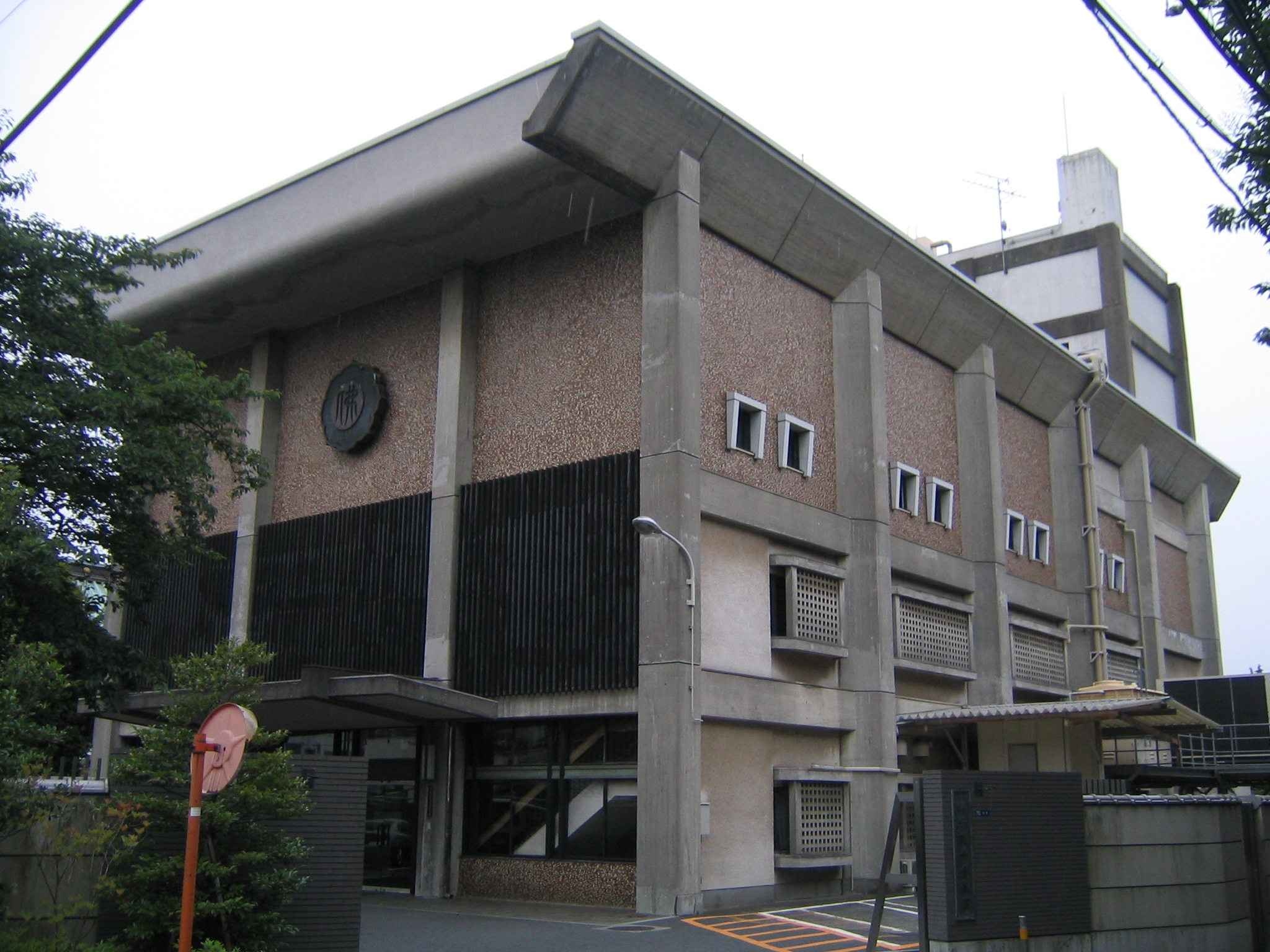
Headquarters of Bussho Gonenkai Kyōdan

Bussho Gonenkai Kyōdan (佛所護念会教団) is an offshoot of Reiyūkai and branch of Nichiren Buddhism. It was founded in 1950 in Japan by Kaichi Sekiguchi and his wife Tomino Sekiguchi.

Its teachings are based on the Lotus Sutra. Ancestor veneration is another important pillar of its religious practice. Its third president was Noritaka Sekiguchi, the son of Kaichi and Tomino Sekiguchi, and a member of the Nippon Kaigi representative committee. Following his death in November 2014, his son Yoshikazu Sekiguchi took over as the fourth president. By its own account, Bussho Gonenkai Kyōdan has about 2 million members, most of which are in Japan.
