= Myōdōkai Kyōdan =

Japanese Buddhist lay organisation that stems from the Reiyūkai

The Myōdōkai Kyōdan (妙道会教団) is a Japanese Buddhist lay organisation that stems from the Reiyūkai, a branch of Nichiren Buddhism. It was founded in 1951 and has approximately 219,000 adherents, most of whom are in Japan. The current president of Myōdōkai Kyōdan is Keiji Sahara. The organisation's headquarters are in Tennōji, Ōsaka. One of its core teachings is the belief in the Lotus Sutra.

== Sources ==
- 妙道会教团 (Chinese)
