= Risshō Kōsei Kai =

Japanese Buddhist religion (1938–present)

- 立正佼成会
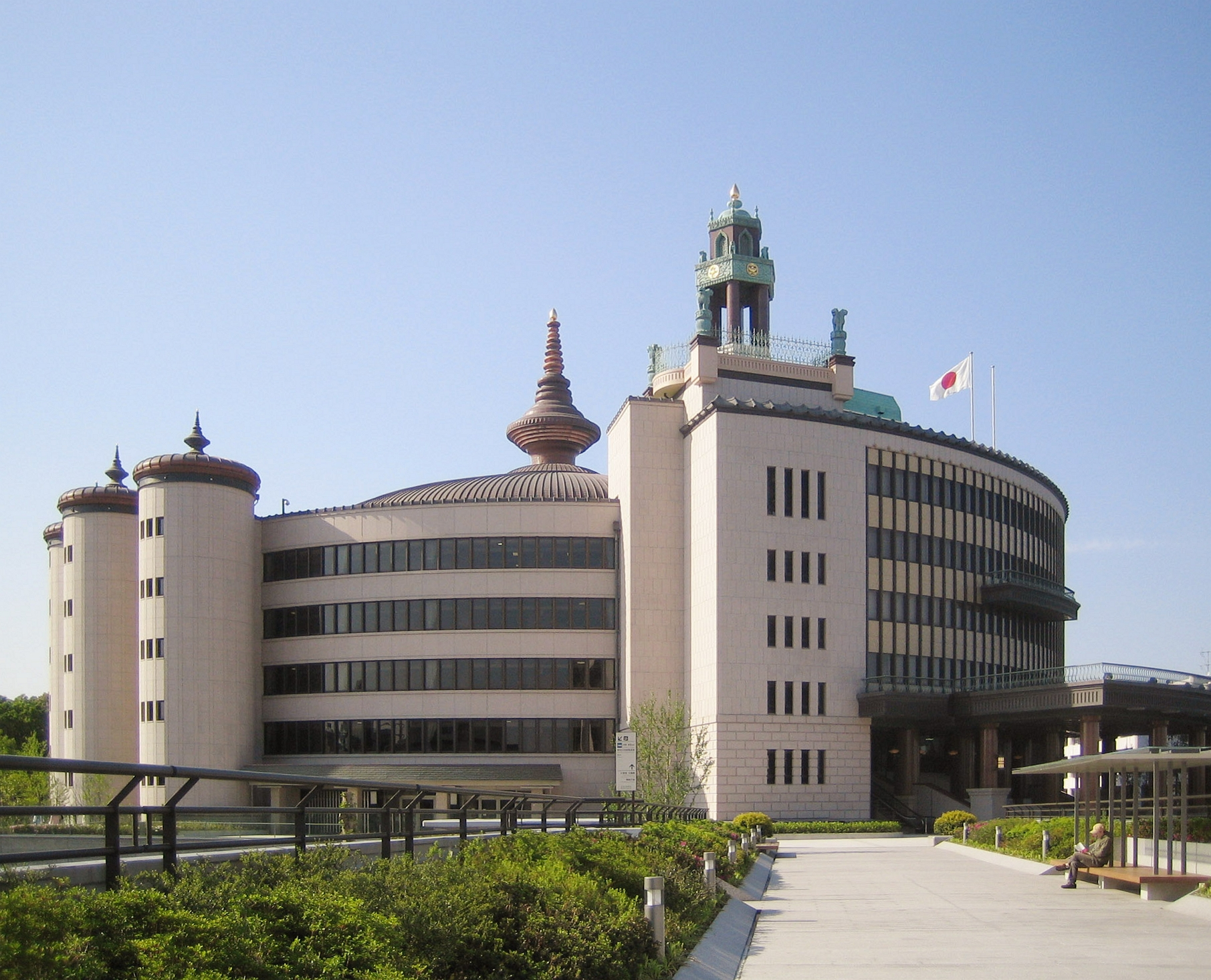
- Risshō Kōsei Kai headquarters (The Great Sacred Hall) in Suginami, Tokyo, Japan.
- Formation: March 5, 1938; 88 years ago
- Founder: Nikkyō Niwano; Myōkō Naganuma
- Founded at: Tokyo
- Type: New religious movement (Japan)
- Headquarters: 2-11-1 Wada, Suginami-ku, Tokyo 166-8537, Japan
- Key people: Nichiko Niwano

Risshō Kōsei Kai (立正佼成会) (until June 1960, Dai-Nippon Risshō Kōsei Kai (大日本立正交成会)) is a Japanese Buddhist religious movement founded in 1938 by Nikkyō Niwano and Myōkō Naganuma. Risshō Kōsei Kai is organized as a lay Buddhist movement, which branched off from the older Reiyūkai, and is primarily focused around the Lotus Sutra and veneration of ancestors.

The name of the organization can be translated as "Association for Establishing the Correct [Dharma] and Harmonious Achievement" or "Society for the Realization of Righteousness and Harmony."

== History ==
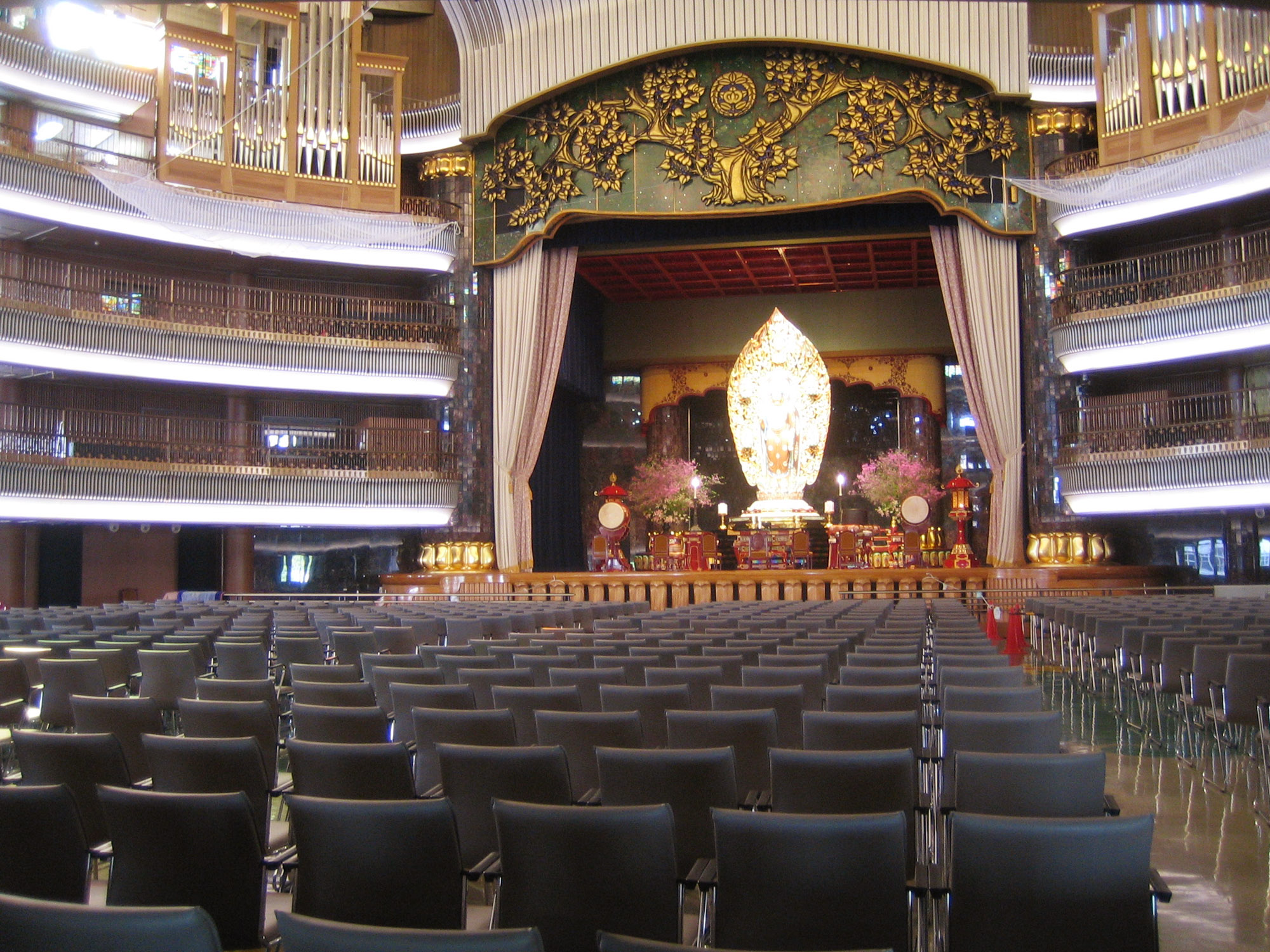
Inside of the Great Sacred Hall

Risshō Kōsei Kai was founded on March 5, 1938 by Nikkyō Niwano and Myōkō Naganuma, both former members of the Buddhist sect Reiyūkai. Niwano met Naganuma while he was engaged in missionary work with Reiyūkai and the two became close friends. In 1938, they attended a Reiyūkai meeting in which its president made remarks that lectures and study of the Lotus Sutra were out of date. After hearing that and consulting with each other, they determined that they could not support such ideas and left Reiyūkai. It was then that they decided to form a new organization. The first meeting was held at Niwano's house and some 30 people joined at that time.

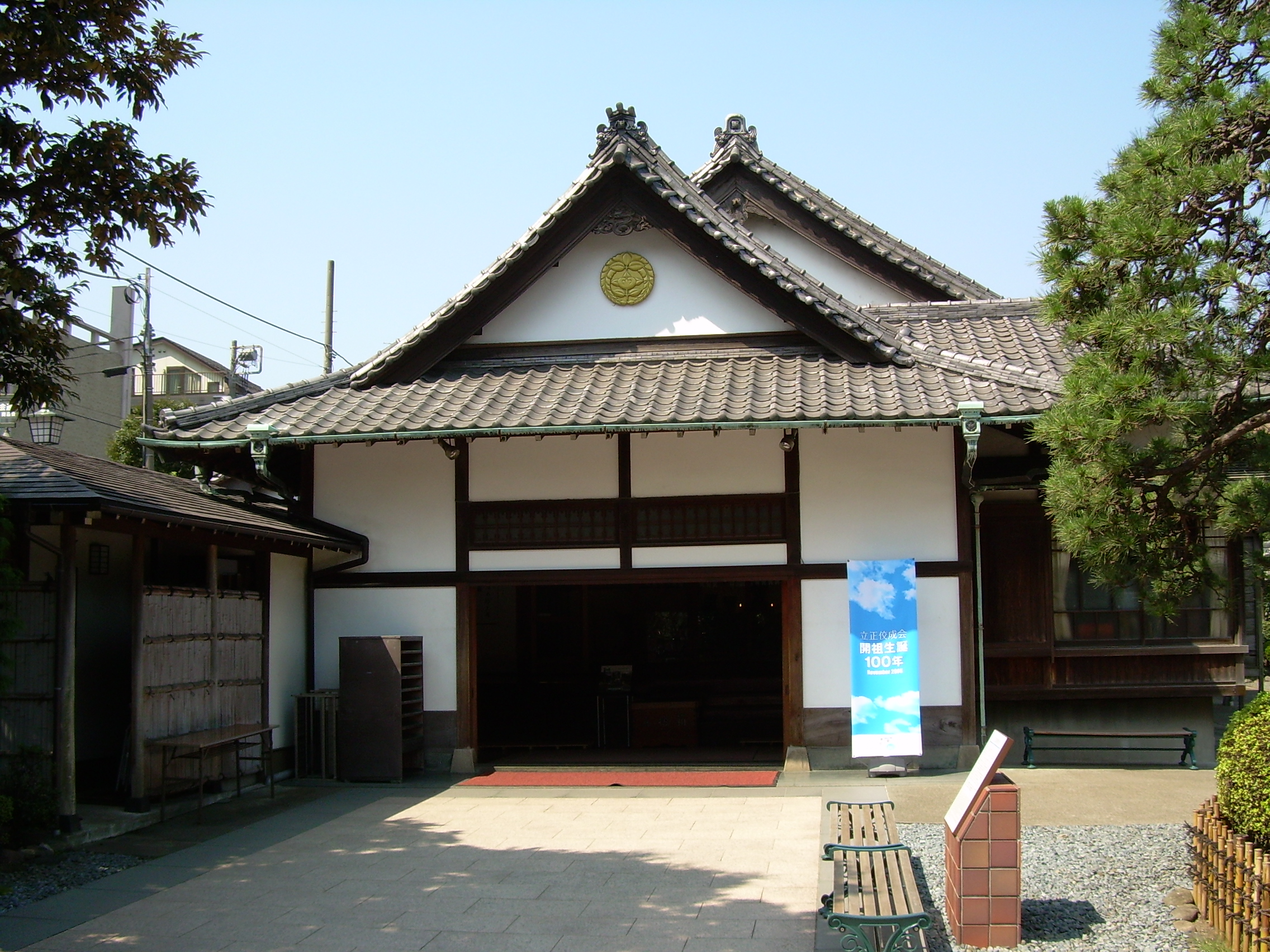
Original headquarters

The organization grew quickly, and by 1941, membership had reached 1,000. For a short period between 1949 and 1950, Risshō Kōsei Kai served as a lay auxiliary organisation of Nichiren-shū, but Niwano could not stem what he considered to be the liberal policies of Nichiren-shū. No longer able to meet at Niwano's house, construction on a new headquarters began. However, as membership continued to grow the new headquarters also became too small and work on the Great Sacred Hall, or daiseidō (大聖堂), began in the late 1950s. Myōkō Naganuma, who had been serving as Vice-President, died in September 1957, seven years before the Great Sacred Hall was completed.

It was also then that Risshō Kōsei Kai began to become active in interfaith co-operation. Nikkyō Niwano had a private audience with Pope Paul VI at the Second Vatican Council in 1965 and later attended the 20th World Congress of the IARF in 1969. In 1970 Niwano helped to form the World Conference of Religions for Peace and became a leader of the WCRP.

In 1991, Nikkyō Niwano stepped down as president and his son, Nichiko Niwano, who had been appointed successor and was at that time serving as vice president, took over as president in a special ceremony.

Nichiko Niwano had been designated his successor in 1960. In 1994, Nichiko's eldest daughter, Mitsuyo Niwano, was made Vice President and designated successor. She was given the Buddhist name Kosho by her father and grandfather and is known to members as "Kosho-sama", with -sama being an honorary suffix title in Japanese. Nikkyō Niwano continued to engage in interfaith activities and participate in Risshō Kōsei Kai activities, despite no longer being president. He died on October 4, 1999.

In 2008, Risshō Kōsei Kai International of North America was established because of growth of interest in the group in the United States and Canada. In summer 2009, the US celebrated the 50th anniversary of the group, holding a gathering in Las Vegas, which President Niwano attended.

As of 2010, there are over 240 churches and centers in 20 countries. Membership currently stands at 6.5 million members, with the majority living in Japan.

== Leadership structure ==
Risshō Kōsei Kai is run, both religiously and administratively, by a board of directors, with the Chairman being the head. The office of the President is the highest spiritual office, and he is the chief spiritual leader and master of ceremony. The office of the President is a hereditary office held only by the direct descendants of Nikkyō Niwano. Duties include visiting churches and centers, representing Risshō Kōsei Kai at interfaith and cultural events, giving sermons, speeches and greeting guests. He holds much importance and plays an active role in how the church is run. However, it is the board of directors that holds the final say on all matters.

== Characteristics ==
Even though being regarded as a descendant of Reiyūkai and Nichiren Buddhism it has developed distinct features in terms of doctrine and objects of worship to the extent, that some regard Risshō Kōsei Kai as a separate Buddhist denomination outside of Nichiren Buddhism, thus it has a number of features in common with other Nichiren sects:

- Devotion to the Lotus Sutra as the highest teaching in Buddhism.
- Belief in the Buddha-nature of all beings.
- Recitation of Namu Myōhō Renge Kyō as a Buddhist practice.
- Evangelism of Buddhist teachings, and in particular the Lotus Sutra.
- Veneration of Nichiren as teacher and bodhisattva. He is frequently referred to as daibosatsu (大菩薩, "Great Bodhisattva") in Risshō Kōsei Kai liturgy.

=== Object of Devotion ===
Risshō Kōsei Kai venerates the Eternal Buddha, the central figure of the Lotus Sutra, instead of a gohonzon. The central temple, the Great Sacred Hall, features a statue of the Eternal Buddha that is 6.09 meters tall and 3.03 meters wide. The imagery of the Eternal Buddha used in the Great Sacred Hall, and all temple altars, is of a standing Buddha enveloped in a fiery halo, within are four, smaller Bodhisattvas:

- Bodhisattva Eminent Conduct
- Bodhisattva Boundless Conduct
- Bodhisattva Pure Conduct
- Bodhisattva Steadfast Conduct

Further above the Buddha's head is a small image of the stupa of Prabhutaratna, featured in Chapter 11 of the Lotus Sutra.

Additionally, members enshrine a Sōkaimyō (総戒名, "Family Posthumous Name"), which is a kind of certificate and object of veneration that represents the collective ancestors of that member. Because it is not feasible to provide each ancestor with a posthumous Buddhist name, the ancestors as a whole are venerated through the Sokaimyo.

=== Basic Teachings ===
Risshō Kōsei Kai places a strong emphasis on studying the Lotus Sutra and the Buddha's teachings. They affirm the basic teachings of Buddhism, such as the Four Noble Truths, the Noble Eightfold Path and the Three Seals of the Law, among their core teachings. The Threefold Lotus Sutra is the group's chief scripture. It is viewed as containing the highest teachings of Gautama Buddha.

=== The Buddha and the Dharma ===
Adherents believe that Gautama Buddha was the first human to be awakened to the Dharma, which is believed to be an invisible entity that sustains, guides and improves the lives of all living things. They refer to this life force as the Eternal Buddha, teaching that it is omnipresent and universal.

=== Daily Practice ===
Members begin and end each day by chanting parts of the Lotus Sutra and saying various prayers and vows before family altars in their home. The center of the altar is the Focus of Devotion, either a scroll with an image of the Eternal Buddha Shakyamuni on it or a small statue of the Eternal Buddha. Members leave offerings of rice, water and tea before the image.

=== Hōza or Dharma Circle ===
Another practice frequently found in Risshō Kōsei Kai services and meetings is the hōza (法座; "Dharma Circle") which is a kind of informal, group session led by a trained leader, in which members sit in a circle, discuss their problems or their shortcomings, and other members listen and provide advice. The discussions usually will explore how Buddhism and insight can be applied to help the person with the problem, and encourage a sense of trust and community between members.

=== Holidays ===
Risshō Kōsei Kai observes various Buddhist and Japanese holidays, including Parinirvana Day, Buddha's Birthday, Bodhi Day, and Higan. They also have special gatherings to mark important events in the organizations history, such as memorial services for the Founder and Co-Founder and the Anniversary of the Founding of Risshō Kōsei Kai.

== Interfaith and peace activities ==
Since its founding, Risshō Kōsei Kai has sought to cooperate with other religions and work with the United Nations and a variety of nongovernmental organizations (NGOs).

=== Interfaith co-operation ===
Nikkyō Niwano was one of the founders of the World Conference of Religions for Peace. Since the founding of the WCRP in 1970, Risshō Kōsei Kai has been actively involved with the organization and currently President Nichiko Niwano is a president of the WCRP.

In 1981 Nikkyō Niwano was elected as the President of the International Association for Religious Freedom and in 1984 hosted the IARF at the Great Sacred Hall.

Nichiko Niwano is currently the President of the Japanese branch of the WRCP and Chairman of Shinshuren. The organization is also involved with the Asian Conference of Religions for Peace and maintains close ties to the Unitarian Universalist Association. The interfaith relationship with the Unitarian Universalist Association is the closest one the latter American liberal organization has ever achieved.

=== UNICEF and United Nations ===
Risshō Kōsei Kai has supported UNICEF since 1979 and members regularly participate in campaign activities related to UNICEF. It has also supported and participated in a number of UN programs, including the second Special Session of the United Nations General Assembly Devoted to Disarmament held in 1982.

=== Humanitarian projects ===
Risshō Kōsei Kai engages in numerous campaigns to end hunger and poverty, support the environment and work for peace. In the late 1960s, Risshō Kōsei Kai began to advocate the Brighter Society Movement, a public-spirited undertaking through which the local churches of Risshō Kōsei Kai cooperate with local governments, welfare organizations, and volunteer groups throughout Japan.

In 1974, it launched the Donate a Meal Movement, in which one skips a meal twice a month and contribute the money saved to the Movement. During the last thirty years, over ¥11 billion has been donated in Japan and thousands more worldwide to the movement.

There is also the Little Bags of Dreams Campaign started in 1999, in which local churches have the youth members prepare cloth bags full of toys, small gifts and cards with well wishes, for children in war torn nations, such as Northern Ireland, Palestine and the former Yugoslavia.

The Niwano Peace Foundation was established in 1978 to promote research for world peace and religious, cultural, scientific and educational endeavors. Starting in 1983, with the exception of 1988, it has on a yearly basis given out the Niwano Peace Prize to an individual or organization that contributes to world peace.

=== Music ===
Risshō Kōsei Kai is known in the field of music for its support of several leading professional music ensembles, most notably the Tokyo Kosei Wind Orchestra. Its facilities are also used to host the world's largest music competition, the All-Japan Band Association national band contest.

== Literature ==
- Anderson, Richard W. (1994). "Risshō Kōseikai and the Bodhisattva way: Religious ideals, conflict, gender, and status". Japanese Journal of Religious Studies. 21 (2–3): 312–337. doi:10.18874/jjrs.21.2-3.1994.311-337.
- Gerlitz, Peter, "Die Rissho Kosei-kai und ihre Assimilation im Westen", in: Michael Pye, Renate Stegerhoff (eds.), Religion in fremder Kultur. Religion als Minderheit in Europa und Asien, Saarbruecken: Dadder 1987, pp. 111–122
- Gerlitz, Peter (1975). "Kathartische und therapeutische Elemente in der Seelsorge der Risshō Kosei-kai." Zeitschrift für Religions- und Geistesgeschichte 27 (4), 346-356
- Inaba, Keishin; in: Clarke, Peter B. (2006). Encyclopedia of new religious movements, New York: Routledge. ISBN 0415267072, pp. 539–540
- Kisala, Robert (1994). Contemporary Karma: Interpretations of Karma in Tenrikyō and Risshō Kōseikai, Japanese Journal of Religious Studies 21 (1), 73-91
- Kyoden Sutra Readings: Extracts from the Threefold Lotus Sutra, Romanized Japanese and English Translation, Risshō Kōsei Kai 1994
- Stewart Guthrie: A Japanese New Religion: Rissho Kosei-Kai in a Mountain Hamlet (Michigan Monograph Series in Japanese Studies), Univ of Michigan 1988. ISBN 0939512335
- Kato, Bunno (1993). The Threefold Lotus Sutra. Tokyo: Kosei Publishing Company. p. 348. ISBN 4333002087. PDF
- Morioka, Kiyomi (1979). The Institutionalization of a New Religious Movement, Japanese Journal of Religious Studies 6 (1/2), 239-280
- Morioka, Kiyomi (1994). Attacks on the New Religions: Risshō Kōseikai and the “Yomiuri Affair, Japanese Journal of Religious Studies 21 (2-3), 281-310
- Niwano, Nikkyō (1976), Buddhism For Today: A Modern Interpretation of the Threefold Lotus Sutra, Tokyo: Kōsei Publishing Co., ISBN 4333002702 PDF
- Staemmler, Birgit; Dehn, Ulrich M. (2011). Establishing the Revolutionary: An Introduction to New Religions in Japan. Münster: LIT Verlag. ISBN 978-3-643-90152-1.
- Stone, Jaquelin (2003). "Nichiren's Activist Heirs: Soka Gakkai, Rissho Koseikai, Nipponzan Myohoji", in Christopher Queen et al., "Action Dharma, New Studies in Engaged Buddhism", RoutledgeCurzon, pp. 63–94
- Watanabe, Eimi (1968). Risshō Kōsei-Kai: A Sociological Observation of Its Members, Their Conversion and Their Activities. Contemporary Religions in Japan 9 (1/2), 75-151
