= Jingak Order =

South Korean Vajrayana Buddhist form

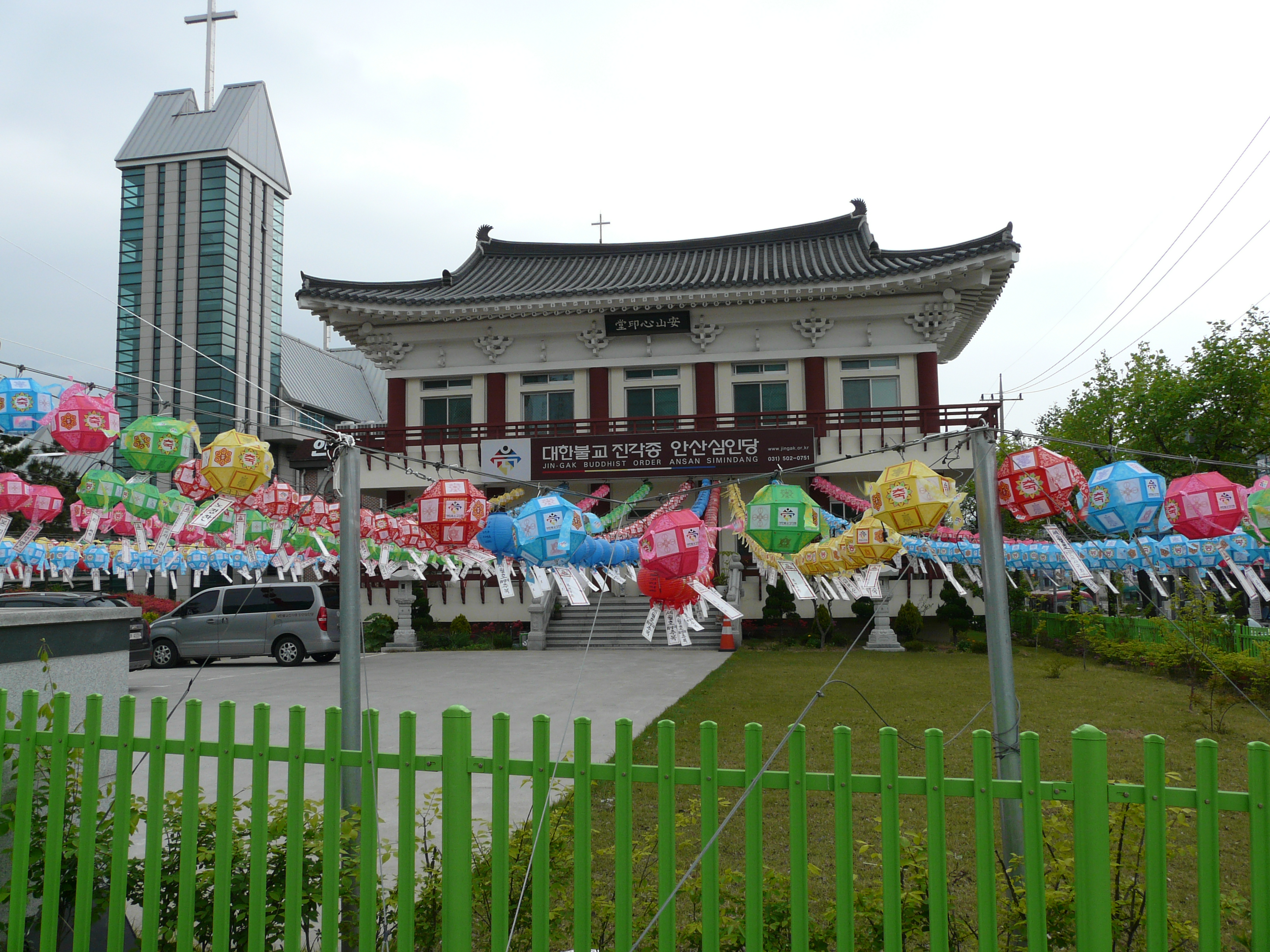
Jin-Gak order Buddhist temple in Ansan

Jin Gak Order of Korean Buddhism (대한불교 진각종, 大韓佛教眞覺宗), or Jingak Order, is a modern South Korean form of Vajrayana Buddhist tradition founded on 14 June 1947 by Grand Master Daejongsa Son Gyu‑sang (Hoedang, 孫珪祥; 1902–1963).

== Doctrine and Practice ==
The Jingak Order emphasizes Dharmakaya‑Mahavairocana Buddha as its guiding doctrine—describing the Buddha as the immanent oneness encompassing all three realms of existence. It places greater devotional focus on Vairocana rather than Sakyamuni Buddha.

Its esoteric teachings are derived from a revised lineage of Japanese Shingon Buddhism and incorporate the dual mandalas—the Garbhadhātu (Womb Realm) and Vajradhātu (Diamond Realm). The order's main mantra is the Korean version of the Six‑Syllable Mantra "Om Ma Ni Ban Me Hum".

Monks in the Jingak Order may marry and wear their hair long; married couples may serve as co-preachers, reflecting a more inclusive approach to monastic practice.
