= Gedatsukai =

Japanese new religious movement founded in 1929

Gedatsu-kai (解脱会, Gedatsu-kai), or Nirwana Association, is a Japanese new religious movement founded in 1929. The number of adherents exceeded 200,000 in the 1990s. It is a syncretic movement, with influences drawing from traditional Shinto and Shingon Buddhist teachings. Its central deity is Gochi Nyorai (Mahāvairocana). Gedatsu is the Japanese term for moksha or enlightenment. Gedatsu-kai is a non-sectarian study, having no firm affiliation with any existing religious groups.

== Founder and family ==
Gedatsu-kai was established by Seiken Okano (born Eizo Okano) in 1929. Okano was born in what is now Kitamoto, Saitama in 1881. Okano fell ill in 1925 with pneumonia, and upon recovering, expressed greater interest in religion. He visited Shinto and Buddhist shrines and temples, eventually associating himself with practitioners of those faiths. In 1929, he was believed to have had a divine revelation, urging him to further his religious exploration; Okano founded Gedatsu-kai later that year. He dedicated the rest of his life to guiding others to the same spiritual awakening he had received. In 1948, Okano died, and was given the title "Gedatsu Kongō Sonja" within the Church. Church members refer to him as "Kongō Sama" or "Sonja," and pay homage to him regularly through prayer.

His successor (referred to as Hoshu, or Dharma successor) is the late Abbot Seiho Okano, an affiliate of the revisionist lobby Nippon Kaigi, and the chairman of the board of directors is Bishop Teruo Okano. Reverend Naoya Okano is affiliated with the Gedatsu Church of America.

== History ==
Ine Kenyu Kiyota was a student of Seiken Okano, and was given the mission to spread Gedatsu-kai to the United States. Kiyota brought Gedatsu-Kai to California during the late 1930s. Upon the beginning of World War II, Kiyota, along with the Japanese and Japanese American populace in the United States, were forced into relocation camps. Kiyota refused to pledge loyalty to the United States in protest of the internment, and was sent to the Tule Lake Camp. Kiyota spent her time in Tule Lake practicing Gedatsu-kai, and spreading the teachings of Seiken Okano. Upon being released from Tule Lake, Kiyota founded the first branch of the Gedatsu Church of America in San Francisco.

After Okano's death in 1948, management of church affairs was passed to Bishop Takeo Kishida. In 1950, Kishida moved to the United States, passing church operations to individual congregations in the Tokyo area. Kishida purchased 20 acres of farmland in Sacramento, California, founding the Sacramento Branch, and dedicating the land as the goreichi, or spiritual grounds, for the United States. In 1952, the church purchased a church building in Los Angeles, California, and founded its third U.S. branch. Kishida returned to his former position within Gedatsukai in Japan in 1964, and began alternating his service semiannually between Japan and the United States.

In 1961, the original San Francisco branch of the church dissolved, and the American headquarters moved to Los Angeles. In 1981, the Honolulu branch of the Gedatsu Church of America was founded in Honolulu, Hawaii.

== Beliefs and practices ==
The ultimate objective of Gedatsu-kai is for its sincere practitioners to achieve spiritual enlightenment, and to free one from negative karma. The central object of worship within the church is the Universal Life Force, sometimes referred simply in English as God. According to the church, the Universal Life Force gives all things life, having a similar role as most central deities in some major religions. One of the most important teachings of Gedatsu-kai is maintaining reverence to God and one's ancestors. Gedatsu-kai emphasizes that an individual receives blessings from their country, parents, teachers, society, and everything that has been created by the Universal Life Force, and that individuals must give thanks to the givers of those blessings. Seiken Okano expressed that every part of life is integrated with religion, and that all of an individual's experiences and actions directly effect one's spirit, and one must take that into account when living their daily life to gain a "true peace of mind."

An important part of Gedatsu-kai prayers is the Amacha Kuyo, or Amacha Blessing. The Amacha Blessing is performed by pouring Amacha tea on a Kuyo-To (a wooden plaque inscribed with religious characters). The blessing is performed with intention for all spirits to receive, another part of giving thanks to ancestors. Seiken Okano's case of pneumonia in 1929 was supposedly healed by consumption of Amacha Tea.

The Hannya Shingyo, better known as the Heart Sutra, is a Buddhist mantra that is performed as a part of the regular prayer.

Members of the church worship three objects, which represent different entities within the study. The first is the Supreme Spirit of the Universe, and the second is Gochi Nyorai (Mahavairocana Buddha), which means literally "Universal Buddha of Five Wisdoms." The Supreme Spirit of the Universe and Gochi Nyorai are intertwined, both representing the Universal Life Force. The difference lies in the specifics, with the Supreme Spirit of the Universe originating from Shinto, and Gochi Nyorai originating from Buddhism. The third object is Gedatsu Kongo Sonja, in respect to his role as the founder of the church.

The church holds multiple festivals annually to celebrate and appreciate the blessings they receive from ancestors and guardian spirits.

Gedatsu-kai is non-sectarian, which allows it to be practiced in conjunction with other religions. The church, especially in the United States, is open to members of other religions to partake in church services.

== Location ==
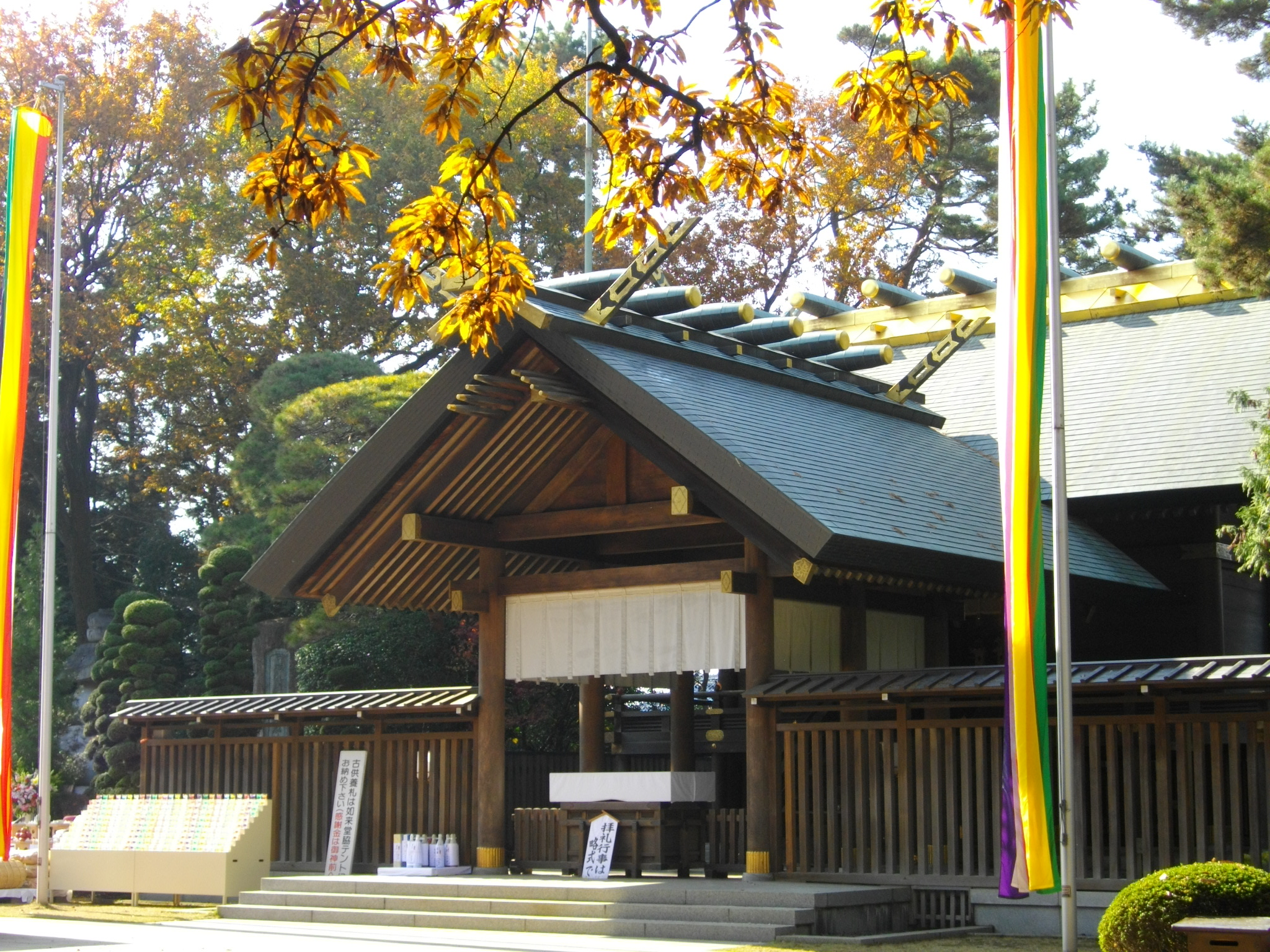
Tenjinchigi Shrine at the goreichi in Kitamoto.

Gedatsu-kai has branches throughout Japan. The church's administrative headquarters are located in Shinjuku, Tokyo, but its sacred grounds, or goreichi, are located in the founder's home town in Kitamoto, Saitama. There are also several branches in the United States, where the organization is called "Gedatsu Church". The largest branches are located in Los Angeles, California, Sacramento, California, and Honolulu, Hawaii. The goreichi of the United States is located on the church grounds in Sacramento.

== Bibliography ==
- Earhart, H. Byron. (1980). Gedatsukai: One life history and its significance for interpreting Japanese new religions , Japanese Journal of Religious Studies 7 (2–3), 227–257
- Earhart, H. Byron. (1983). Review: Gedatsukai: Its Theory and Practice (A Study of a Shinto-Buddhist Syncretic School in Contemporary Japan) by Minoru Kiyota, Journal of the International Association of Buddhist Studies 6 (1), 154–156
- Hardacre, Helen (1991). Review: Gedatsu-Kai and Religion in Contemporary Japan: Returning to the Center by H. Byron Earhart, Journal of Japanese Studies 17 (1), 211-217
