= Gedatsu Church of America =

American Buddhist church

Religion
- Affiliation: Gedatsukai
- Leadership: Senior Reverend Akira Sebe (Sacramento); Reverend Kazuo Yamada (Sacramento); Reverend Micaela Rodriguez (Sacramento); Reverend Hisakazu Taki (Los Angeles); Reverend Naoya Okano (Los Angeles); Reverend Tatsunori Kamiya (Honolulu)

Location
- Location: 4016 Happy Lane; Sacramento, CA 95827 (Sacramento branch); 7850 Hill Drive; S. San Gabriel, CA 91770 (Los Angeles branch); 6095 Summer Street; Honolulu, HI 96821 (Honolulu branch); 2569 Clay Street; San Francisco, CA 94115 (formerly) (San Francisco Branch)
- Country: United States

Architecture
- Founder: Seiken Okano; Ine Kenyu Kiyota
- Established: 1945

Website
- Gedatsu Church homepage

Gedatsu Church of America is an American Buddhist church with branches in Japan, Sacramento, Los Angeles, and Hawaii. A nonsectarian spiritual movement, it is based on the Japanese Gedatsu-kai, a new religious movement that was founded in 1929 by Seiken Okano. The Church preaches about Gedatsu-kai, a religious study dedicated toward promoting total inner peace and spiritual enlightenment. Gedatsu is the Japanese term for moksha or enlightenment.

== Establishment and history ==
Seiken Okano (a.k.a. Gedatsu Kongo), the founder of Gedatsu Church of America, was born in Japan in 1881. According to the Church, Kongo received a revelation from God at the age of 48. He established the Gedatsu Church in 1929, devoting himself to leading people to spiritual awakening, enlightenment and peace until his demise in 1948.

Ine Kenyu Kiyota was a student of Okano's, and was given the mission to spread Gedatsu-Kai to the United States. Kiyota brought Gedatsu-Kai to California during the late 1930s. Upon the beginning of World War II, Kiyota, along with the Japanese and Japanese-American populace in the United States, were forced into relocation camps. Kiyota refused to pledge loyalty to the United States in protest of the internment, and was sent to the Tule Lake Camp. Kiyota spent her time in Tule Lake practicing Gedatsu-Kai, and spreading the teachings of Seiken Okano. Upon being released from Tule Lake, Kiyota founded the first branch of the Gedatsu Church of America in San Francisco, California.

In 1950, Bishop Takeo Kishida, the most prominent member of Gedatsu-Kai in Japan, moved to the San Francisco Branch. Later that year, Kishida purchased 20 acres of farmland in Sacramento, California, founding the Sacramento Branch, and dedicating the land as the goreichi, or spiritual grounds, for the United States. In 1952, the church purchased a church building in Los Angeles, California, and founded its third U.S. branch. In 1961, the original San Francisco Branch of the church dissolved, and the American headquarters moved to Los Angeles, and in 1981, the fourth church branch was founded in Honolulu, Hawaii.

== Branches ==
The three current branches of the Gedatsu Church of America are the Sacramento, Los Angeles, and Honolulu Branches. Total membership of the church is disputed, with Kishida claiming followers of Gedatsu-Kai in North America amount to roughly 2000 in the early 1980s, while those who were considered actually active was much lower, in the low hundreds.

In the 1980s, the San Francisco and Sacramento churches were mostly Japanese speaking, but the Los Angeles church differed, integrating English into its ceremonies and services. In 2019, all three churches hold services in English, but only the Los Angeles branch still holds services for Japanese speakers.

== Goreichi ==
The goreichi in Sacramento is home to several Gedatsu shrines. The list of shrines at the goreichi, and their descriptions are as follows.

- Tenjinchigi
  - Tenjinchigi is the source of all life and unconditional love. The word comes from the Shinto God of Nature, but represents the Supreme Spirit of the Universe.
  - The Tenjinchigi is depicted as a wooden house, modeled after the Tenjinchigi shrine at the goreichi in Kitamoto, Japan. In front of the shrine is a Torii, a wooden arch that acts as a gateway to a sacred place.
- Benzaiten
  - Benzaiten is the Gedatsu Water deity. At the Benzaiten shrine, water and its life sustaining properties are appreciated.
  - The Benzaiten shrine is located on an island in a man-made pond. The pond is often drained due to its expensive upkeep.
- Fudo Myo-o
  - The Fudo Myo-o, or Fudo Deity, comes from Buddhism, and represents stability and peacefulness.
  - The Fudo Myo-o shrine is made up of a large statue of the Fudo deity. He sits upon a pedestal, watching over a fire pit in front of him. The fire pit is used during seasonal festivals for the purpose of burning ceremonial plaques. The Fudo Myo-o is depicted with one eye open and one eye closed, and holding a sword. The sword represents the act of cutting away the obstacles to enlightenment, and his eyes represent both the discipline and the compassion of the Supreme Spirit of the Universe.
- Bato Kanzeon
  - The Bato Kanzeon originates from Buddhism, and is Gedatsu's guardian spirit of traffic safety.
  - The Bato Kanzeon consists of a large stone tablet upon a pedestal, with the Chinese character for "horse" carved into it. Formerly, there were small statues of horses on either side of the tablet, but they were stolen by vandals and never replaced.
- Rokujizo
  - Rokujizo comes from Buddhism and is the guide that aids humans out of the six states of human suffering, hence "roku." Rokujizo is a representation of the Supreme Spirit of the Universe's unconditional love.
  - The Rokujizo shrine is a long stone pedestal, with six statues sitting upon them.
- Memorial Tower
  - The Memorial Tower is a building dedicated to enshrining deceased church members. Their names are enshrined inside the building, along its walls. Gedatsu Kongo is enshrined in the center.
- All Souls Monument
  - The All Souls Monument is dedicated to the appreciation of all living things. One could express thanks to their deceased family and ancestors, or to fallen soldiers, slain Native Americans, or victims of natural disasters.

Inside the main church building, there is an altar that holds the three objects of worship in Gedatsu-kai, the Tenjinchigi, Gochi Nyorai, and Gedatsu Kongo.

The church grounds also has a repurposed military surplus quonset hut, known as the Social Hall, which served as the church hall until the current church building was built.

== See also ==
- Gedatsu-Kai
