= Myōchikai Kyōdan =

Japanese Buddhist lay organisation that stems from Reiyūkai

- Founders: Miyamoto Kohei
- Type: Japanese new religious movement
- Leader: Miyamoto Mitsu
- Website: http://myochikai.jp/

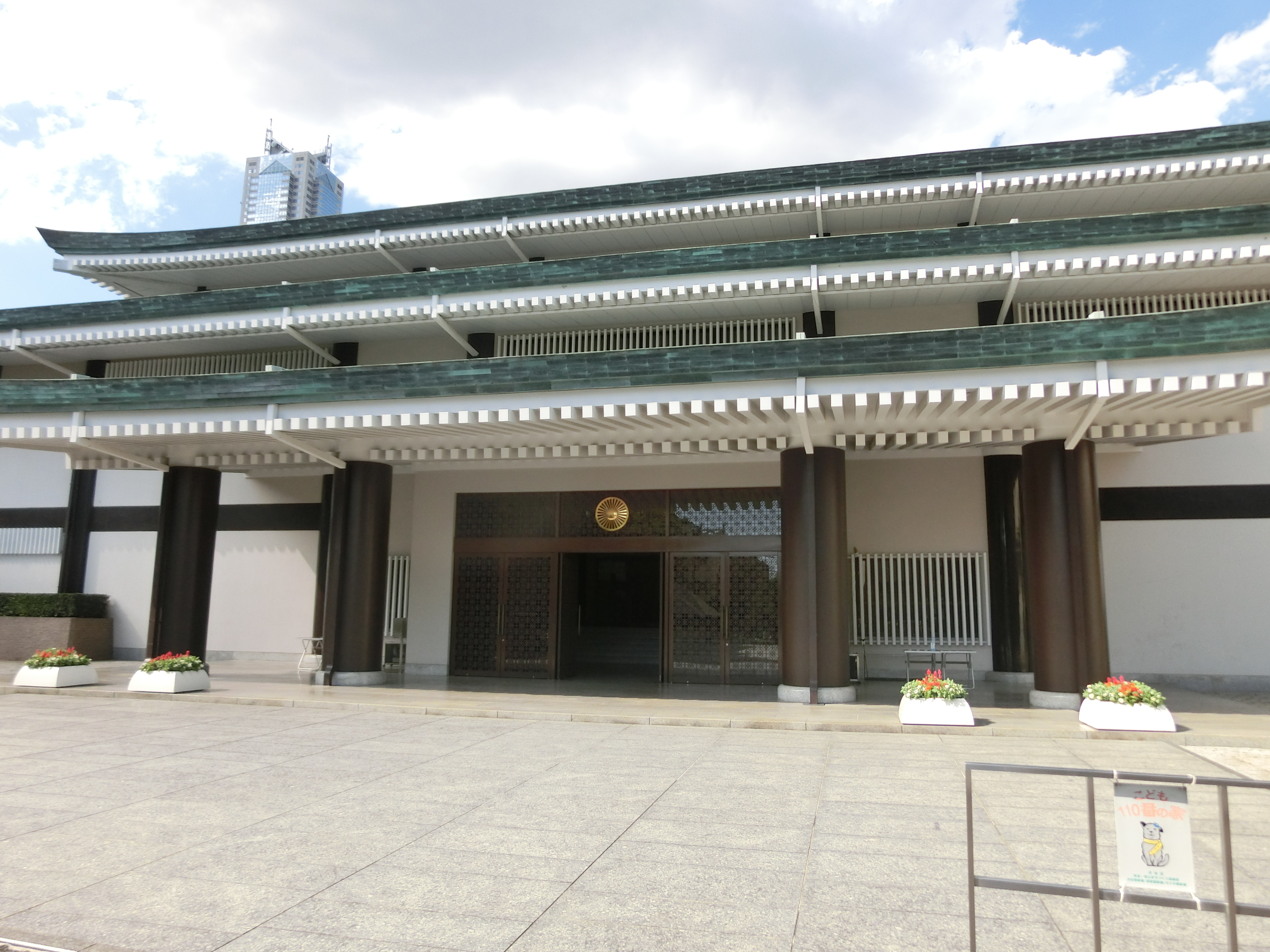
Headquarters of the organisation

Myōchikai Kyōdan (妙智会教団) is a Japanese Buddhist lay organisation that stems from Reiyūkai. It was founded in 1950 by Miyamoto Mitsu. Its teachings are based on Nichiren Buddhism and the Lotus Sutra. By its own account it has close ties as an NGO with UNICEF and the UNHCR. The director of Myōchikai Kyōdan, was selected for General Director for the Japanese Council of the World Council of Religions for Peace.

Its current leader is Miyamoto Takeyasu who is also president of the Arigatou Foundation. The organisation’s headquarters is in Tokyo and by its own account it has 957.000 members, most of which are in Japan. Reciting the Lotus Sutra as a means of moral self-cultivation and ancestor veneration are said to be fundamental to its religious practice.

== Bibliography ==
- Robert Kisala: Myochikai Kyodan. In: Peter Clarke (Hrsg.): Encyclopedia of New Religious Movements. ISBN 0-203-48433-9
