= Reiyūkai =

Japanese Buddhist new religious movement

Reiyukai
Total population
- 2 million

Founder
- Kakutaro Kubo

Website
- reiyukaiglobal.org

Reiyūkai (霊友会, Spiritual-Friendship-Association), or Reiyūkai Shakaden, is a Japanese Buddhist new religious movement founded in 1919 by Kakutarō Kubo (1892–1944) and Kimi Kotani (1901–1971). It is a lay organization (there are no priests) inspired by Nichiren Buddhism, but not affiliated to any particular sect.

Reiyūkai considers itself the grandfather of lay-based new religions devoted to the Lotus Sutra and ancestor veneration. Reiyūkai membership currently stands at 5.14 million members, with the majority living in Japan.

== History ==
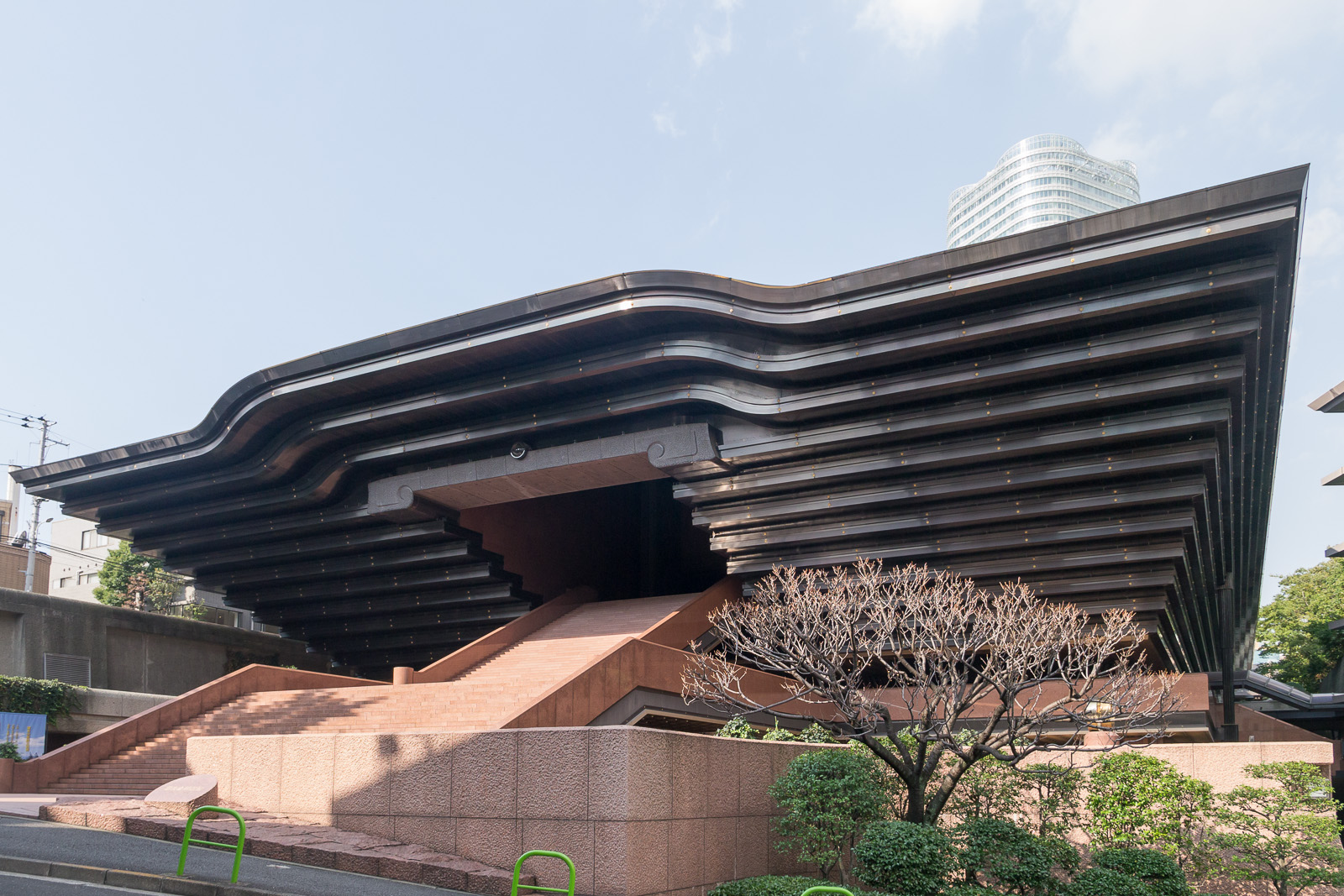
Shakaden

In the 1920s, during the crisis after the 1923 Great Kantō earthquake and the following economic depression, Kakutaro Kubo began formulating his philosophy for what is now Reiyūkai. He compiled and published The Blue Sutra (a collection of texts from the Threefold Lotus Sutra), used by members for recitation practice.

In 1930, Reiyūkai was formally inaugurated, Kakutaro Kubo became Chairman of the Board of Directors and Kimi Kotani became President. In 1937, headquarters were established in the Iikura area of Tokyo. In 1954, the Reiyūkai Youth Group was inaugurated.

In 1971 Kimi Kotani died and Tsugunari Kubo became president. The next year, a Reiyūkai Center was established in the United States. It was followed by centers in Brazil and Canada (1975); the Philippines (1976); Mexico, Italy, and Taiwan (1977); the United Kingdom (1978, closed as of March 1998); Peru, Thailand, and France (1979); India, Nepal, and Paraguay (1983); Spain (1984); Korea (1988); Bolivia (1996) and Sri Lanka (1999). In 1980, the Reiyūkai’s Inner Self Development campaign began.

In 1978, the public Bureau of Statistics of Japan counted 2,838,000 members, that is 2.46% of the total population.

In 1985, representatives from 14 countries participated in a Youth Speech Festival in commemoration of United Nations International Youth Year. Since then, national festivals are held annually throughout the world and international festivals are held in the Asian, American and European regions on a regular basis.

In 1990, the Sixth International Youth Year Speech Festival was held in Osaka, Japan, as part of the International Garden and Greenery Expo ’90. Representatives from 17 countries attended.

In 1992, Reiyūkai International Operation for Cambodian Relief (RIOCR) opened its office in Cambodia. The next year, Reiyūkai International Committee was inaugurated.

In 1994, the Tenth International Youth Year Speech Festival was held in Kathmandu, Nepal. In 1996 Tsugunari Kubo resigned as President of Reiyūkai and Yae Hamaguchi became her successor. The Reiyūkai-sponsored Lumbini International Research Institute (LIRI) was inaugurated in Nepal and the International College for Advance Buddhist Studies (ICABS) was established in Tokyo. The First Reiyūkai Supervisory Council was inaugurated.

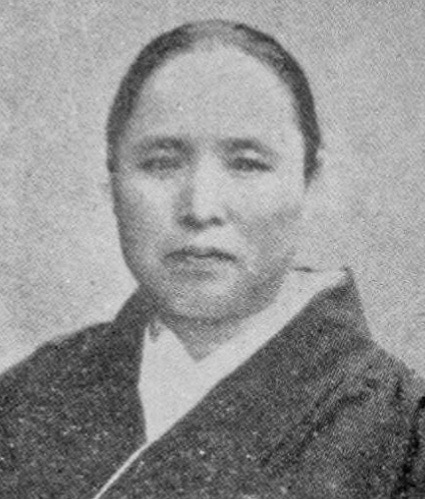
Kotani Kimi (小谷喜美) 1901-1971

In 1999, Reiyūkai established Japanese and English homepages on the Internet. In 2000, the 4th Reiyūkai International Conference was held in Tokyo. Yae Hamaguchi died, and Ichitaro Ohgata succeeded as President, Yushun Masunaga and Hiromichi Hirakawa as Vice Presidents.

In August 2004, the Reiyūkai sponsored, together with Japan International Cooperation Agency (JICA), the UN World Food Program and the Nikkei newspaper, the World Youth Peace Summit (WYPS) Japan conference, as a direct outcome of the Asia-Pacific Regional Conference. It was held at the United Nations University in Tokyo. Over 400 youth delegates engaged in lively discussion and decided to mark the date, August 5th, as International Youth Peace Day and will organize an event on that day each year. The summit was broadcast by the Japanese national broadcaster, NHK, on its BS Forum.

In 2007, thanks to the contribution of members of Reiyukai Eurasia community, as an NGO committed to rural development acting in India and Nepal, a new eye hospital, the Reiyukai Eiko Masunaga Eye Hospital, was established in Nepal.

From April 8, 2013, Masaharu Sueyoshi is currently the Reiyūkai International President.

Reiyukai France is a member of the European Buddhist Union (EBU) since 1997.

== Main locations ==
=== Shakaden ===
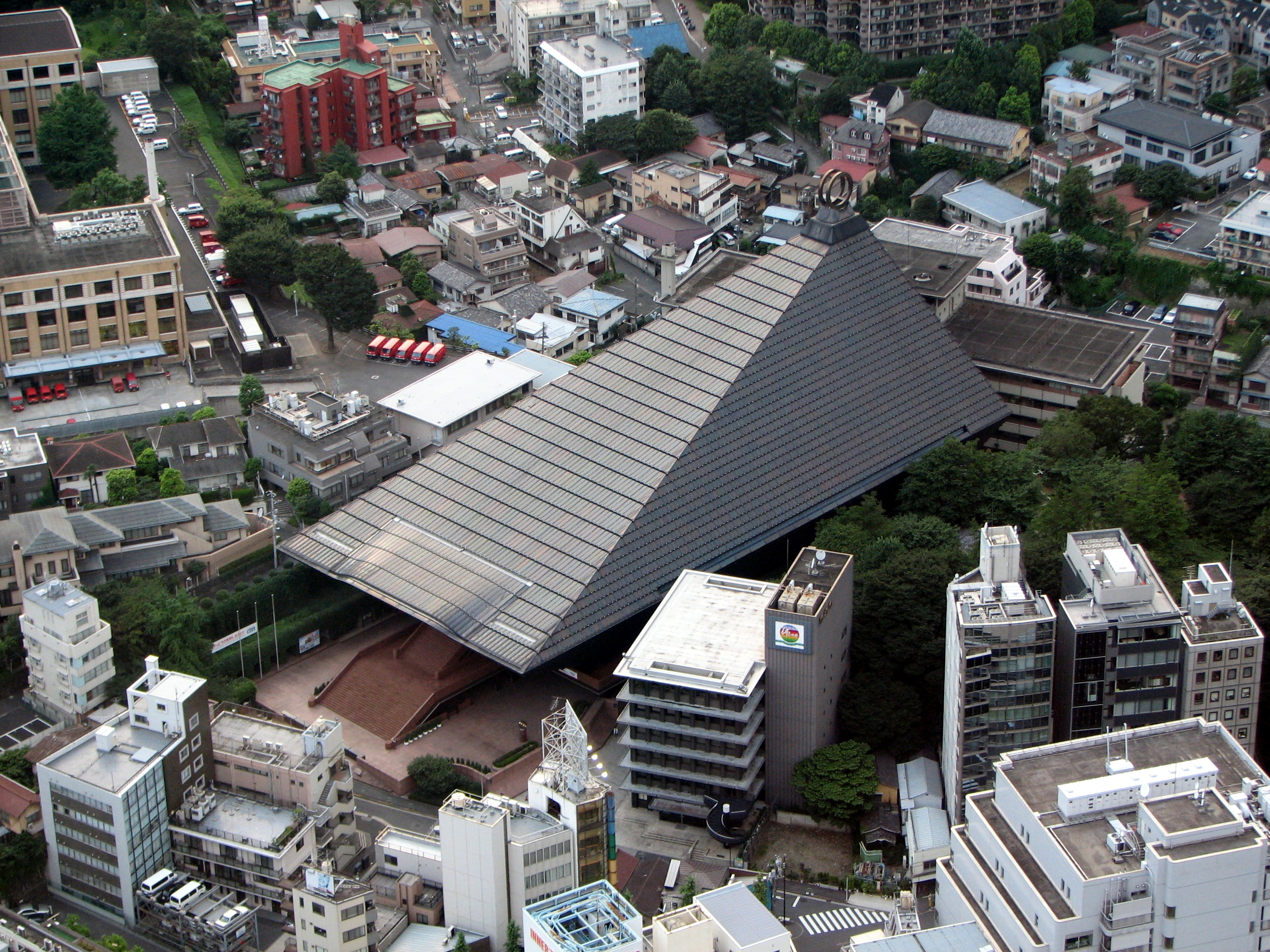
Shakaden seen from Tokyo Tower main observatory

The Shakaden (釈迦殿) is an architectural complex that serves as a meeting place and social center for Reiyūkai members in the local community. In Japanese, "Shakaden" means the "House of Shakyamuni." It is a place where anyone can seek to further practice the teachings of Shakyamuni Buddha. It consists of the Main Hall, the Plaza, the Kotani Hall, various conference rooms, a cafeteria, a child care room, and a nurse's office. After four years of construction, the Shakaden was completed in 1975.

Shakaden is a 3-minute walk from Kamiyachō Station on the Tokyo Metro Hibiya Line.

=== Mirokusan ===
Mirokusan (弥勒山) is located on the side of Mount Togasa (遠笠山) in the center of the Amagi Mountains (天城山) on the Izu Peninsula. Its building was strongly supported by Kimi Kotani, as a meeting point for young people, for an immersive visit in a natural environment, where members can exchange experiences with other members. It was completed in 1964. It is dedicated to Miroku (弥勒), that is Maitreya, a future Buddha, whose apparition is waited by all Buddhists.

== Derived movements ==
Reiyukai has experienced a number of splits headed by some members; further offshoots from Reiyūkai are Risshō Kōsei Kai, Bussho Gonenkai Kyōdan, Myōchikai Kyōdan, and Myōdōkai Kyōdan.

== Political influence ==
Reiyukai is a pacifist movement. For Reiyukai, peace can be achieved through the promotion of one’s personal development for the benefit of all humanity.

The Inner Trip Ideologue Research Center (IIC) was founded to raise awareness about the value and importance of engaging people within society, fulfilling one’s civic responsibilities, and participating in the political process. As an opportunity to deepen the knowledge of politics and to transmit the voices of people, the IIC organizes various lectures and seminars in different locations within Japan inviting politicians as guest speakers. Also, the IIC publishes a monthly magazine providing a space for politicians to present their political viewpoints. Former Tokyo governor Shintaro Ishihara is a believer and writes in Reiyūkai publications.

Claudine Shinoda, of Reiyukai France, has been president of EBU for three years and vice-president for six. In this role, she was a speaker in various international meetings:

- in an UN event at Bangkok in May 2007 : Speech on Buddhism and governance
- at UNESCO at Paris in October 2006 on European Buddhism
- at the European Parliament in Bruxelles in 2008: Discours sur la place des femmes dans le bouddhisme Reiyukai lors du Colloque sur la place des femmes dans le bouddhisme.

The Committee on Non-Governmental Organizations (NGO) of United Nations, opening its regular session for 2015, recommended sixteen organizations for special consultative status with the United Nations Economic and Social Council, including Reiyūkai Eurasia.

== Gallery ==
Shakaden (釈迦殿) Hall Space in front of the main hall

Illuminated square

Rest area

Purification fountain (手水舎)

View of Tokyo Tower

Headquarters Building

View from the north side of Shakaden

Mt. Miroku Facilities

== Literature ==
- Deal, William E.; Ruppert, Brian (2015), A Cultural History of Japanese Buddhism: John Wiley & Sons. p. 222-
- Chryssides, George D. (2012), Rowman & Littlefield, Historical Dictionary of New Religious Movements (2nd edition), p. 293
- Buswell, Robert E., Lopez, Donald S. Jr. (2014). The Princeton Dictionary of Buddhism, Princeton: Princeton University Press, p. 709 (Reiyūkai)
- Hardacre, Helen (1984). Lay Buddhism in Contemporary Japan: Reiyukai Kyodan, Princeton Univ Press. ISBN 0691072841
- Hardacre, Helen (1979). Sex-role norms and values in Reiyūkai, Japanese Journal of Religious Studies 6 (3), 445-460
- Kubo, Katsuko; O'Drobinak, Charles J.; trans. (1982). Reflections in search of myself, Tokyo: Sangaku Publishing
- Kubo Tsugunari, Yuyama Akira (tr.) The Lotus Sutra. Revised 2nd ed. Berkeley, Calif. : Numata Center for Buddhist Translation and Research 2007.
- Kubo Tsugunari, The philosophical foundation of the lay Buddhist practice of the Reiyukai, as depicted in the Lotus Sūtra (1988, first edition)
- Montgomery, Daniel (1991). Fire in the Lotus, The Dynamic Religion of Nichiren, London: Mandala, ISBN 1852740914
- Lai, Whalen (1985), Review of: Helen Hardacre, Lay Buddhism in Contemporary Japan: Reiyūkai Kyōdan, Japanese Journal of Religious Studies 12 (4), 358-362
