= Shakubuku =

Proselytization in Nichiren Buddhism

Translations of Shakubuku
- English: Break and subdue
- Japanese: 折伏

Shakubuku "break and subdue" (折伏) is a term that originates in the Chinese version of the Buddhist text, Śrīmālādevī Siṃhanāda Sūtra.

The term has historically been used to indicate the rebuttal of false teachings and thereby break negative patterns in one's thoughts, words and deeds. In modern times, the term often refers to the proselytization and conversion of new adherents in Nichiren Buddhism and especially Soka Gakkai (see second President of Soka Gakkai Josei Toda), and the rebuttal of teachings regarded as heretical or preliminary. However, shakubuku had begun to be de-emphasised by Soka Gakkai leadership towards the end of the 1960s, in part because it was leading to an excessive number of unremarkable or undedicated conversions, with many new members soon falling off.

Although often associated with the teachings of the Japanese Buddhist priest Nichiren, the term frequently appears in the SAT Daizokyo and the works of the Chinese Tiantai patriarchs Zhiyi and Zhanran. Nichiren Buddhist organizations such as Kokuchūkai, Nichiren Shōshū and Soka Gakkai continue to use the term today, which is meant to underline or convince a counterpart of one's own interpretation of Buddhism. The term took on a more militant meaning by Japanese Nichiren Buddhist ultranationalists in the Imperial era, such as Tanaka Chigaku and Nisshō Inoue, whose ideas are known as Nichirenism.

Another method of propagation mentioned by Nichiren is shōju (摂受), which underlines the individual's own insight on Buddhism. Nichiren himself referred to both methods in his "Opening of the Eyes" (開目抄, Kaimokushō). A combination of the two is known as shōju-shakubuku (摂受折伏). In Japan, the term shakubuku is used when proselytising adherents of other Buddhist traditions, while shōju is used when proselytising non-Buddhists. In the West today, though, shakubuku and shōju are interchangeably used to refer to the same method of proselytization of Nichiren Buddhism.
