= Kusano =

Kusano (草野) may refer to:

- Kusano, Fukushima, village located in Iwaki District, Fukushima Prefecture
- Kusano Station (Fukushima), JR East railway station located in Iwaki, Fukushima Prefecture, Japan
- Kusano Station (Hyōgo), train station in Sasayama, Hyōgo Prefecture, Japan

== People with the surname ==
- Daisuke Kusano (born 1976), Nippon Professional Baseball player
- Hironori Kusano (born 1988), singer, idol, and former member of the J-pop group News
- Kusano Naoya (草野 直哉; born 2001), Japanese sumo wrestler
- Mitsuyo Kusano (born 1967), female Japanese TV presenter and news anchor
- Shinpei Kusano (1903–1988), Japanese poet and writer
- Yuki Kusano (草野 侑己; born 1996), Japanese footballer
