= Masanori Tominaga =

Japanese film director (born 1975)

- Born: October 31, 1975 (age 49); Ehime Prefecture, Japan
- Occupation: Film director
- Years active: 2006–present

Masanori Tominaga (冨永 昌敬, Tominaga Masanori, born October 31, 1975) is a Japanese film director. His 1999 short film, Dolmen, received the Honorary Mention of the International Jury at the International Short Film Festival Oberhausen in 2000.

== Career ==
Tominaga directed the first feature film, The Pavillion Salamandre, starring Joe Odagiri. He directed Pandora's Box, starring Shota Sometani and Riisa Naka, based on the novel by Osamu Dazai. He directed the comedy film, Vengeance Can Wait, starring Minami, Tadanobu Asano, Eiko Koike and Takayuki Yamada.

Tominaga directed The Echo of Astro Boy's Footsteps, which is a documentary about Matsuo Ohno, the sound designer for Astro Boy. It was described by James Marsh of Twitch Film as "not only a dream documentary for anyone who is a fan of the iconic Japanese anime character, but also a delight for audio-tech fanatics who remain unsated even after Berberian Sound Studio." It was listed by Jasper Sharp of Midnight Eye as the best Japanese film of 2012. The film screened at the Flatpack Film Festival in 2013.

== Filmography ==
=== Feature films ===
- The Pavillion Salamandre (2006)
- Konna Otona no Onna no Ko (2007)
- Pandora's Box (2009)
- Vengeance Can Wait (2010)
- Niwa ni Onegai (2011)
- The Echo of Astro Boy's Footsteps (2011)
- Me o Tojite Gira Gira (2011)
- Pumpkin and Mayonnaise (2017)
- Sutekina Dynamite Scandal (2017)
- Between the White Key and the Black Key (2023)
- Strangers in Kyoto (2025)

=== Short films ===
- Dolmen (1999)
- Vicunas (2002)
- Kamemushi (2003)
- Tetrapod Report (2003)
- Oriente Ring (2004)
- Shirley Temple Japon (2005)
- Shirley no Tenraku Jinsei (2009)
- The Restaurant of Many Orders (2012) - based on Miyazawa Kenji's short story
- News Lounge 25 (2012)

=== Music videos ===
- Naruyoshi Kikuchi - "Nocturne for Machiko Kyo" (2005)
- Soil & "Pimp" Sessions - "Mashiroke" (2007)
- Sotaisei Riron - "Jigoku Sensei" (2008)
- Etsuko Yakushimaru - "Oyasumi Paradox" (2009)
