= The Restaurant of Many Orders =

1924 short story by Kenji Miyazawa

- Author: Kenji Miyazawa
- Language: Japanese
- Genre: Children's literature
- Publication date: December 1, 1924
- Publication place: Japan

"The Restaurant of Many Orders" (Japanese: 注文の多い料理店, romanized: Chūmon no ōi ryōriten) is a short story by the Japanese author Kenji Miyazawa.

== Synopsis ==
Two gentlemen in Western-style dress go hunting in the woods, accompanied by two dogs and a guide. After a day of hunting, they have failed to capture any game, they have become separated from their guide, and their dogs suddenly collapse; appearing dead. As the two gentlemen lament their losses and trudge forward, they suddenly turn to find a large Western-style house with a sign reading, "Restaurant Wildcat House Western-Style Cooking". The hungry gentlemen, though unnerved, enter the restaurant to encounter a series of doors that open before and close behind them. Each door is preceded by a sign, the first few of which bear double-entendre messages of welcome. The gentlemen interpret these signs, apologizing for the restaurant's "many orders", as indicating the restaurant's popularity and quality. Later signs bear commands (the Japanese 注文 chūmon having the same two senses as the English "orders") instructing the men to undress and rub themselves with strange substances. All the while, growing hungrier and colder, the men speculate about the fine food and diners they expect to find in a restaurant so discerning.

Finally, the men realize they cannot go back and realize that they will be devoured by the proprietor of the house if they approach the last door. In a deus ex machina, their previously thought to be dead dogs return to fight the demons lying behind the final door and the house vanishes into mist. The gentlemen are rejoined by their guide, and they return to Tokyo forever traumatized by the experience.

== Film adaptations ==
- 1958 - Chūmon no ōi ryōriten (puppet animation)
- 1993 - Chūmon no ōi ryōriten (animation)
- 2012 - Chūmon no ōi ryōriten (in Bungo sasayaka na yokubo)

== TV adaptations ==
- Getsuyō Onna no Suspense (Bungo series)
  - Aired December 10, 1990 (TV Tokyo)
- 80nen go no Kenji - Miyzawa Kenji Eizō Dōwa shū
  - Aired February 20, 2013 (NHK BS Premium) commemorating 80th anniversary of Miyazawa Kenji's death.
  - Director: Shibue Shūhei
  - Cast: Yoshiyoshi Arakawa, Sarutoki Minagawa, Yasoda Yūichi

== See also ==
- Night on the Galactic Railroad
- Gauche the Cellist
- Kaze no Matasaburo
- Hansel and Gretel (a German fairy tale collected by the Brothers Grimm)
