= Strong in the Rain =

Book by Lucy Birmingham and David McNeill

Strong in the Rain: Surviving Japan's Earthquake, Tsunami, and Fukushima Nuclear Disaster
- Author: Lucy Birmingham and David McNeill
- Language: English
- Publisher: Palgrave Macmillan
- Publication date: 2012
- Pages: 226
- ISBN: 9781137278944

Strong in the Rain: Surviving Japan's Earthquake, Tsunami, and Fukushima Nuclear Disaster is a book by Lucy Birmingham and David McNeill published in 2012. The title is taken from the Japanese poem by Kenji Miyazawa about endurance.
