= Gauche the Cellist (film) =

- DVD cover

Japanese name
- Kanji: セロ弾きのゴーシュ
Transcriptions
- Revised Hepburn: Sero Hiki no Gōshu
- Directed by: Isao Takahata
- Screenplay by: Isao Takahata
- Based on: Gauche the Cellist by Kenji Miyazawa
- Produced by: Kôichi Murata
- Starring: Hideki Sasaki; Fuyumi Shiraishi; Akiko Takamura; Atsuko Mine; Junji Chiba; Masashi Amenomori
- Cinematography: Toshiaki Okaseri
- Edited by: T. Nishimura
- Music by: Michio Mamiya
- Production company: Oh! Production
- Release date: January 23, 1982
- Running time: 63 minutes
- Country: Japan
- Language: Japanese

Gauche the Cellist (セロ弾きのゴーシュ, Sero Hiki no Gōshu) is a 1982 Japanese animated film written and directed by Isao Takahata, based on the short story of the same name by Kenji Miyazawa and featuring the music of Ludwig van Beethoven. It was animated by Oh! Production. The film follows a young cellist named Gauche who aspires to hone his craft while interacting with various animals that visit his house each night. The film received the 1981 Ōfuji Noburō Award.

== Plot ==
Gauche lives in a tiny house on the outskirts of town and serves as the cellist for his local orchestra, which is rehearsing the Pastoral Symphony by Ludwig van Beethoven. Gauche disappoints the orchestra with his lesser abilities and the conductor is almost ready to remove him altogether. During the next few nights, Gauche is pestered by visits from a variety of animals (including a cat, a bird, a raccoon dog, and a mouse), each with their own musical requests. However, unbeknownst to Gauche these prompts from the animals guide him in surpassing his mistakes and weaknesses as a cellist, readying him for the upcoming big concert.

== Production ==
The film was produced independently by the small but long-established production company Oh! Production, which would go on to provide supporting animation for many films by Isao Takahata and Hayao Miyazaki. It was rare for such a small production company to undertake an entire feature film.

Aside from the in-between animation team, most of the film was made by two artists: Takamura Mukuo drawing the backgrounds and Shunji Saida drawing all the key animation. The film's lead key animator, Shunji Saida, learned how to play the cello so that he could observe and authentically animate the finger movements of a cellist. Despite a relatively short runtime of 63 minutes, the film took six years to finish and received acclaim as one of the greatest film adaptations of Miyazawa's writing.

== Release ==
In 2000, Pioneer released the Region 2 NTSC DVD with English subtitles, re-releasing it for the Japanese market in 2003. In 2001, the Region 2 PAL DVD was released in France featuring a French dub. In 2006, a double-disc re-release was put out by Studio Ghibli and Buena Vista Home Entertainment in honor of Kenji Miyazawa's 110th birthday alongside Ghibli's adaption of Miyazawa's Taneyamagahara no Yoru. In 2006, an English-subtitle version was released featuring Dolby Digital audio. In 2014, a "multi-touch book" app was released by Oh! Production and Onebilling Inc., including illustrations, art boards, a film trailer, and sakuga key animation.
