= The Nighthawk Star =

Japanese children's story by Kenji Miyazawa

- Author: Kenji Miyazawa
- Original title: よだかの星
- Language: Japanese
- Genre: Children's, fantasy, philosophy
- Publisher: Chikuma Bunko, Chikuma Shobo (Japanese), Kodansha International, Northern Book Centre (English)
- Publication date: ~1921
- Publication place: Japan

The Nighthawk Star (よだかの星, Yodaka no Hoshi) is a popular Japanese children's short story by Kenji Miyazawa, thought to have been written around 1921. It was a part of the Complete Works of Kenji Miyazawa, Vol. 5 (「宮沢賢治全集」 第５巻) published by Chikuma Bunko (ちくま文庫), which was later updated to be a part of the Newly Collected Complete Works of Miyazawa Kenji, Vol. 8 (「新修宮沢賢治全集」第八巻) published by Chikuma Shobo (筑摩書房).

The short story has also been translated into English in different collections of Miyazawa's short stories such as: Once and Forever, the Tales of Kenji Miyazawa, translated by John Bester, published by Kodansha International in 1998; and Miyazawa Kenji's Ten Japanese Stories for Children, published by Northern Book Centre in 2005.

== Plot summary ==
The Nighthawk, which is a nightjar, is bullied and teased by the other birds for his appearance. He is described as an "ugly bird" with an evenly dotted face and legs so weak he can barely walk. Even a lark who is not that beautiful thinks himself to be more superior to the Nighthawk, but when it comes to the real Hawk, none of the other birds dare to insult him.

The Hawk knows and dislikes the fact that Nighthawk has "hawk" in his name. He always threatens him and one night he confronts Nighthawk at his home demanding him to change own name. Hawk even recommends changing it to "ICHIZO" which he thinks is not that bad, but Nighthawk does not wish to because it is a name given to him by God. It is the one thing he values the most: his identity. Hawk leaves and states that if he does not place a tag around his neck with "ICHIZO" and inform all the birds of his new name he will kill him.

Nighthawk contemplates why all the birds dislike him so much because of his appearance. He flies out to the clouds where some insects fly into his mouth awkwardly and realizes that he too is killing them just as the hawk plans to kill him. He thinks he should starve, stop killing insects and decides to fly far away. He bids farewell to his younger brother, the Kingfisher and asks him to convey his best wishes to their sister the Hummingbird. Nighthawk returns to his home crying.

The next day he flies to the Sun asking to take him even if his body is burned, but the Sun replies that since he is a night bird it will be better to ask the stars during the evening. As Nightfall hits, Nighthawk flies to the skies and asks the star of the West, Orion, to take him, but his request is completely ignored. Nighthawk flies staggering down but regains momentum and flies back to the sky. Next he asks the star of the South, the Great Dog, but his request is mocked and rejected as well. Again he falls to the ground but flies back up. This time he asks the star of the North, the Great Bear. The Great Bear replies that his request is non-sense and that he should cool off. Disappointed, Nighthawk flies down but recovers and asks the star of the East to take him, but Hawk calls his request absurd and replies that he needs status and money to become a star.

With no more energy left Nighthawk plummets to the ground but just one foot before reaching it, he skyrockets towards the sky. Midway through he croaks like the hawk. Soon his body becomes cold, his breath frozen and the air extremely thin. He does not know if he is falling or flying but he is in a peaceful state of mind. After sometime, Nighthawk opens his eyes and sees that he is glowing blue beside the star, Cassiopeia. Now nighthawk's star glows on forever, even to this day.

== Major themes ==
Determination and will power are the predominant themes occurring in the story, with non-violence and self-sacrifice underlying the outline of the story as well.

== Adaptations ==
In 2012, a live action film based on the story was made under the same title Yodaka no Hoshi, directed by Reiko Saito featuring Akiko Kikuchi.

On YouTube multiple versions of stage plays and modern takes of the story can be found such as "Star of Yodaka" (『よだかの星』予告編 ).
