= Centurions (TV series) =

Television series

- Title card
- Genre: Action; Science fiction
- Created by: Gil Kane, Jack Kirby, Doug Wildey
- Voices of: Michael Bell; Jennifer Darling; Vince Edwards; Ron Feinberg; Pat Fraley; Ed Gilbert; Diane Pershing; Bob Ridgely; Neil Ross; B. J. Ward
- Narrated by: William Woodson (Opening Narration)
- Theme music composer: Udi Harpaz
- Country of origin: United States
- Original language: English
- No. of seasons: 2
- No. of episodes: 65

Production
- Executive producers: Joe Ruby; Ken Spears
- Producer: Larry Huber
- Animator: Nippon Sunrise Studio 7
- Running time: 30 minutes
- Production company: Ruby-Spears Enterprises

Original release
- Network: first-run syndication
- Release: April 7 – December 12, 1986

Centurions is an American science fiction animated television series produced by Ruby-Spears and was animated in Japan by Nippon Sunrise's Studio 7. The series began in 1986 as a five-part mini-series and was followed with a 60-episode series. The series was story edited by Ted Pedersen and written by several authors, including prolific science fiction writers Michael Reaves, Marc Scott Zicree, Larry DiTillio and Gerry Conway.

The series theme and soundtrack were composed by Udi Harpaz. There was also a line of tie-in toys by Kenner and a comic book series by DC Comics.

The show revolves around the conflict between Doc Terror's cyborgs and the Centurions - who wear a combination of exoskeleton and mecha.

== Premise ==
"In the near future, Doc Terror and his cyborg companion Hacker unleashed their forces to conquer Earth! Only one force can stop this evil: a handful of brave men. In specially created exo-frames, they can be transported anywhere to fuse with incredible assault weapon systems beamed down from the space station Skyvault, becoming man and machine, Power Xtreme! Max Ray, brilliant Sea Operations commander! Jake Rockwell, rugged Land Operations specialist! Ace McCloud, daring Air Operations expert! Whatever the challenge, they are ready - The Centurions!"

— opening narration by William Woodson.

The cyborg mad scientist Doc Terror seeks to conquer the Earth and turn its inhabitants into robot slaves. He is assisted by his cyborg companion Hacker and an army of robots.

At each turn, their evil plans are thwarted by the heroic Centurions. The Centurions are a team of men consisting of Max Ray, Jake Rockwell, and Ace McCloud, dressed in specially created exo-frames that allow them (upon shouting "PowerXtreme") to fuse with 'incredible' assault weapon systems, becoming what the show calls man and machine, Power Xtreme! The result is a weapons platform somewhere between a hard-suit and a mecha. The exo-frames can also be equipped with space gear or diving gear.

The Centurions are based on an orbiting space station called Sky Vault whose operator, Crystal Kane, uses a transporter to send the Centurions, and the requested weapon systems, to where they are needed. To monitor the global situation there are relay stations such as Ice Castle, Sand Castle and Fire Castle. Crystal is always in the company of either Jake Rockwell's dog Shadow or Lucy the orangutan. Shadow is usually more involved with the Centurions' battles than Lucy and sports a harness with dual missile launchers. Crystal suggests tactics and sends equipment as required. The Centurions also have a hidden base in New York City called Centrum. Its entrance is hidden in a bookstore and must be reached via an underground railcar. Centrum serves as the Centurions' land base of operations and also has a beaming pod for rapid transport to Sky Vault. In addition to Sky Vault and Centrum, there is also a Centurion Academy whose location is kept completely secret and only seen in the last 5 episodes. All weapon systems are manufactured by a submersible aquatic Sealab.

== Characters ==
=== The Centurions ===
The main protagonists. There were originally three but two more were added later on in the series.

Original Team:

- Max Ray – A commander in sea operations. Calm and level headed and the de facto leader of the team, he is often the peace maker when Jake and Ace argue. He uses a green exo-frame suit and weapon systems suited for underwater missions.
  - Cruiser – A sea assault weapon system that is used in and out of the water and includes hydro thrusters, and a keel-fin radar unit. Its weapons include two re-pulsars and a missile launcher.
  - Tidal Blast – A sub-surface attack weapon system with two hydro-powered keel-fins used for above and below the water that has battle modes such as cruise, subsonic speed, and rear attack. Its weapons include a re-pulsar lesion cannon and missiles.
  - Depth Charger – A mini-sub with two pontoon thrusters and two mobile directional aqua fins. Its weapons include two cannons, deep-sea torpedoes, and a hydro mine.
  - Sea Bat – A sea assault weapon system that includes a bat-wing thruster unit, a chest hydrofoil unit, and multiple flexi-hose connectors attached to a deep sea scope. Its weapons include barracuda missiles, an explosive depth charge, and heat-seeking harpoons.
  - Fathom Fan - A submersible assault weapon system resembling an airboat with hydrofoil launcher missiles and a small laser in the chest.
- Jake Rockwell – A land operations specialist who uses a yellow exo-frame suit. A passionate idealist with a strong moral compass, he has a short fuse that often puts him at odds with the cocky and casual personality of Ace. His weapon systems have the most firepower and are best suited for land missions.
  - Fireforce – A land assault weapon system that includes back-mounted launcher, twin laser cannons and a rotating plasma re-pulsar. It is waterproof for submerge underwater.
  - Wild Weasel – A protective armor assault weapon system resembling a motorcycle with a head shield and protective back shell. It has battle modes including tracking, anti-aircraft, high-speed travel, and land attack. Its weapons include two land lasers and a front assault pack module for storage.
  - Detonator – A heavy artillery weapon system for maximum firepower. It has many battle modes including air attack and ground assault. Its weapons include sonic ray guns and freeze ray blasters.
  - Hornet – An assault helicopter weapon system with surveillance, high-speed assault, and sneak attack modes. Its weapons include four sidewinder missiles and a rotating freeze cannon.
  - Swingshot – A mid-sized assault weapon system with arm shield blasters and missiles, a chest-mounted howitzer, backpack targeting sensor and infrascope with tank tracks that swings up to cling to the ceiling.
  - Awesome Auger - A vehicular assault weapon system shaped like an ATV with a drill, a sonar shredder and another weapon for boring underground. Changes mode from fold-up to combat seating position and drilling lie-down position.
- Ace McCloud – An air operations expert who uses a blue exo-frame suit. He is a brave but cocky womanizer who is sometimes at odds with Jake. Ace uses weapon systems are best suited for aerial missions.
  - Skyknight – A air assault weapon system that has two turbo thrusters. Its weapons include stincel missiles, laser cannons, and laser bombs.
  - Orbital Interceptor – An air weapon assault system with inner atmospheric thrusters. It has battle modes including cruise, pursuit, and power blast. Its weapons include two particle beam deflectors and a particle beam missile.
  - Skybolt – An air reinforcement weapon system that has two booster stabilizer pods, radar tracking wings, and modular invertible wings with battle modes including reconnaissance, backfire, and anti-attack. Its weapons include missiles and an invisibility cloaking device.
  - Strato Strike – An air assault weapon system that can reverse thrust.

Extended Team (later additions):

- Rex Charger – An energy programmer who uses a red and green exo-frame suit.
  - Electro-Charger - A flight assault weapon system with energy manipulating abilities.
  - Gatling Guard - A heavy flight weapon system with revolver for multiple unusual energy functions missiles.
- John Thunder – An infiltration commander who uses a black exo-frame suit.
  - Silent Arrow - A crossbow-like net cannon weapon system mounted on the back, armor pieces and a sonic knife.
  - Thunder Knife - A tracked assault weapon system with lasers shooting arm mounted cutter wheels, a missile backpack and a tank track platform.

=== Cyborgs ===
- Doc Terror - A scientist whose main goal is to conquer Earth and turn its inhabitants into robotic slaves to suit his purposes.
- Hacker - Terror's right hand-man. He was originally an ordinary criminal before he was persuaded by Terror to be the first human in his experiment of being a cyborg.
- Syntax and Legion - Two computer systems who are respectively bound to Terror and Hacker. They can separate from their hosts at will and merge into a powerful machine called Uniborg.
- Doom Drones Traumatizers – The most commonly seen drones are walking robots with laser blasters for arms.
- Doom Drones Strafers – A flying robot armed with missiles and lasers capable of spaceflight.
- Groundborgs – A land-based robot armed with lasers that move on big wheels.
- Seaborgs – A ship-based robot armed with lasers for sea battle.
- Cybervore Panther – A robotic panther.
- Cybervore Shark – A robotic shark.

=== Supporting characters ===
- Crystal Kane - The operator of the space station Sky Vault who gives the Centurions their missions and transports them, and their requested weapon systems, to the needed location. Jake and Ace often battle for the affections of Crystal
- Shadow - Jake Rockwell's dog who occasionally helps out with their missions.
- Lucy - Crystal's pet orangutan and companion on Sky Vault.
- Amber - Doc Terror's daughter who is a mistress of disguise and often helps her father in his plans.

== Format ==
A typical Centurions episode was 22 minutes in length. The main storyline, usually involving the Centurions foiling a new Doc Terror plan, would take up the majority of the episode, however, the last few minutes were sometimes dedicated to an educational segment in which one or more Centurions characters would break the fourth wall to teach the audience about how the episode's themes apply to the real world. For example, in the episode 'Day of the Animals', in which Doc Terror creates a device which controls animals and gives them powers, the ending segment highlights real abilities of animals, such as the ability of sharks to detect magnetic fields.

== Cast ==
=== Main voices ===
- Michael Bell – John Thunder
- Jennifer Darling – Amber
- Vince Edwards – Jake Rockwell
- Ron Feinberg – Doc Terror
- Pat Fraley – Max Ray, Dr. Wu
- Ed Gilbert – Hacker
- Diane Pershing – Crystal Kane
- Bob Ridgely – Rex Charger
- Neil Ross – Ace McCloud
- B. J. Ward – Cassandra Cross/Lilith Cross
- William Woodson – Narrator

=== Additional voices ===
These actors are listed at the end credits of each episode, but their roles are not listed.

- Dick Gautier – Sukuma (in "Cyborg Centurion")
- Dan Gilvezan – Colonel Chuck Bates (in "You Only Love Twice")
- Tress MacNeille – Isabelle (in "Tornado of Terror")
- Mona Marshall – Pharaoh (in "The Mummy's Curse"), Madame Arpeggio (in "Whalesong")
- Bill Martin – Captain Newman (in "Malfunction"), Demon (in "The Road Devils"), Neutron (in "Sungrazer"), Dr. Damon Zemo (in "Sungrazer")
- Mea Martineau – Mei Lee
- Stacy McLaughlin – Gina (in "Child's Play")
- David Mendenhall – Randy Chang (in "Let the Games Begin")
- Alan Oppenheimer – Professor Storm (in "Tornado of Terror"), Dr. Gates (in "Double Agent")
- Patrick Pinney – Jimmy (in "Child's Play")
- Peter Renaday - Merlin (in "Merlin")
- Peter Cullen - Casca (in "Film at Eleven")
- Stanley Ralph Ross – Claw (in "To Dare Dominion")
- John Stephenson – Dr. Sayer (in "Counterclock Crisis")
- Frank Welker – Dr. Kent (in "An Alien Affair"), Zorg (in "Found: One Lost World"), Lunex (in "Operation Starfall"), Terry (in "Operation Starfall"), Dr. Lucas Yates (in "The Chameleon's Sting"), Chameleon (in "The Chameleon's Sting")
- Keone Young – Blaster McGraw (in "Three Strikes and You're Dead"), Wheel (in "Three Strikes and You're Dead")

== Episodes ==
=== Miniseries ===
No.	Title	Directed by	Written by	Original release date
1	"The Sky Is on Fire"	Pat Ventura	Ted Pedersen	April 7, 1986
2	"Battle Beneath the Sea"	Guy Vasilovich	Michael Reaves and Steve Perry	April 8, 1986
3	"An Alien Affair"	Ian Freedman	Ted Pedersen	April 9, 1986
4	"Found: One Lost World"	Pat Ventura	Don Glut	April 10, 1986
5	"Sand Doom"	Wes Archer	Ted Pedersen	April 11, 1986

=== Main series ===
No.	Title	Directed by	Written by	Original release date
6	"Whalesong"	Mark Drop	Gerry Conway and Carla Conway	September 22, 1986
7	"Tornado of Terror"	Pat Ventura	Gerry Conway and Carla Conway	September 23, 1986
8	"Denver Is Down"	Guy Vasilovich	Matt Uitz	September 24, 1986
9	"Micro Menace"	Ian Freedman	Jack Bornoff	September 25, 1986
10	"Attack of the Plant-Borg"	Wes Archer	Don Goodman	September 26, 1986
11	"Battle Beneath the Ice"	Ian Freedman	Michael Reaves and Steve Perry	September 29, 1986
12	"Operation Starfall"	Guy Vasilovich	Michael Reaves	September 30, 1986
13	"Let the Games Begin"	Mark Drop	Marc Scott Zicree	October 1, 1986
14	"Firebird"	Pat Ventura	Matt Uitz	October 2, 1986
15	"Cold Calculations"	Wes Archer	Kayte Kuch	October 3, 1986
16	"Return of Captain Steele"	Mark Drop	Michael Reaves	October 6, 1986
17	"Three Strikes and You're Dead"	Guy Vasilovich	Larry DiTillio	October 7, 1986
18	"Double Agent"	Ian Freedman	Creighton Barnes	October 8, 1986
19	"Child's Play"	Wes Archer	Kayte Kuch	October 9, 1986
20	"Terror on Ice"	Mark Drop	Herb Engelhardt	October 10, 1986
21	"That Old Black Magic"	Unknown	Gerry Conway and Carla Conway	October 13, 1986
22	"Max Ray...Traitor"	Unknown	Marc Scott Zicree	October 14, 1986
23	"Crack the World"	Unknown	Gerry Conway and Carla Conway	October 15, 1986
24	"The Incredible Shrinking Centurions"	Unknown	Michael Cassutt and Mark Cassutt	October 16, 1986
25	"Live at Five"	Unknown	Michael Charles Hill	October 17, 1986
26	"The Mummy's Curse"	Unknown	Gerry Conway and Carla Conway	October 20, 1986
27	"Counterclock Crisis"	Unknown	Gerry Conway and Carla Conway	October 21, 1986
28	"Zombie Master"	Unknown	Creighton Barnes	October 22, 1986
29	"Malfunction"	Unknown	Creighton Barnes and Matt Uitz	October 23, 1986
30	"Broken Beams"	Unknown	Herb Engelhardt	October 24, 1986
31	"The Chameleon's Sting"	Unknown	Kayte Kuch	October 27, 1986
32	"Film at Eleven"	Unknown	Michael Charles Hill	October 28, 1986
33	"Hacker Must Be Destroyed"	Unknown	Don Glut	October 29, 1986
34	"Showdown at Skystalk"	Unknown	Michael Reaves	October 30, 1986
35	"The Warrior"	Unknown	Mark Edens	October 31, 1986
36	"Return of Cassandra"	Unknown	Gerry Conway and Carla Conway	November 3, 1986
37	"Night on Terror Mountain"	Unknown	Mel Gilden	November 4, 1986
38	"Merlin"	Unknown	Kip Gordy	November 5, 1986
39	"The Monsters from Below"	Unknown	Gary Greenfield	November 6, 1986
40	"The Road Devils"	Unknown	Gary Greenfield	November 7, 1986
41	"Zone Dancer"	Unknown	Michael Reaves	November 10, 1986
42	"Firecracker"	Unknown	Larry DiTillio	November 11, 1986
43	"Traitors Three"	Unknown	Barbara Hambly	November 12, 1986
44	"You Only Love Twice"	Unknown	Martha Humphreys	November 13, 1986
45	"Sungrazer"	Unknown	Michael Reaves	November 14, 1986
46	"Novice"	Unknown	Herb Engelhardt	November 17, 1986
47	"Breakout"	Unknown	Antoni Zalewski	November 18, 1986
48	"Atlantis Adventure, Part I"	Unknown	Steve Perry and Ted Pedersen	November 19, 1986
49	"Atlantis Adventure, Part II"	Unknown	Steve Perry and Ted Pedersen	November 20, 1986
50	"Ghost Warrior"	Unknown	Gerry Conway and Carla Conway	November 21, 1986
51	"Let the Lightning Fall"	Unknown	Gerry Conway and Carla Conway	November 24, 1986
52	"Cyborg Centurion"	Unknown	Michael Charles Hill	November 25, 1986
53	"Day of the Animals"	Unknown	Steve Perry	November 26, 1986
54	"To Dare Dominion, Part I"	Unknown	Michael Reaves and Steve Perry	November 27, 1986
55	"To Dare Dominion, Part II"	Unknown	Michael Reaves and Steve Perry	November 28, 1986
56	"Hole in the Ocean, Part I"	Unknown	Herb Engelhardt	December 1, 1986
57	"Hole in the Ocean, Part II"	Unknown	Herb Engelhardt	December 2, 1986
58	"The Better Half, Part I"	Unknown	Larry Huber	December 3, 1986
59	"The Better Half, Part II"	Unknown	Larry Huber	December 4, 1986
60	"Revenge"	Unknown	Ted Pedersen and Steve Perry	December 5, 1986
61	"Man or Machine, Part 1"	Unknown	Ted Pedersen and Steve Perry	December 8, 1986
62	"Man or Machine, Part 2"	Unknown	Ted Pedersen and Steve Perry	December 9, 1986
63	"Man or Machine, Part 3"	Unknown	Ted Pedersen and Steve Perry	December 10, 1986
64	"Man or Machine, Part 4"	Unknown	Ted Pedersen and Steve Perry	December 11, 1986
65	"Man or Machine, Part 5"	Unknown	Ted Pedersen and Steve Perry	December 12, 1986

== Development ==
The series originated as a tie-in to a 1986 Kenner Toys line, whose interchangeable exo-suit components directly informed the on-screen "Power Xtreme" transformations. The show was eventually cancelled due to the failure of its marketing strategy of high-end action figures, which were too expensive for the 80s market.

Comic book artists Jack Kirby and Gil Kane contributed to the design and concepts of the show, along with fellow comic book artist Doug Wildey, while Norio Shioyama did the character designs. Mitsuo Fukuda was also credited for his involvement in the show as an assistant director.

== Media ==
=== Books ===
In 1986 Golden Books released two illustrated books with cassette stories entitled Vacation on Terror Island and Terror for President, written by Dwight Jon Zimmerman and illustrated by Gene Biggs. Another illustrated book, Centurions Power Extreme Annual 1988, was published in 1988 by World International Limited.

=== Comics ===
In 1987, DC Comics released a 4-part comic book tie-in, written by Bob Rozakis.

=== Games ===
A board game called Centurions: Jake Rockwell's Battle to Stop Dr. Terror Game was released by Parker Brothers in 1986.

A video game called Centurions Power X Treme was published by AriolaSoft for Commodore 64, ZX Spectrum and Amstrad CPC in 1987. It was met with mixed positive to average reception by critics.

== Home media ==
On December 6, 2011, Warner Home Video released The Centurions: The Original Miniseries on DVD in Region 1 via their Warner Archive Collection. This is a Manufacture-on-Demand (MOD) release, available exclusively through Warner's online store and only in the US. On July 21, 2015, Warner Archive released The Centurions: Part One on DVD in Region 1 which contains the first thirty episodes of the regular series. On March 15, 2016, Warner Archive released The Centurions: Part Two on DVD, which contains the remaining thirty episodes of the series.

== Reception ==
In The Encyclopedia of Science Fiction, the show is described as an early animated example of tropes used by the cyberpunk-genre (the integration of human and machine), with its exoskeleton-based modular weapons systems that anticipating later developments in mecha design.
