= Gauche the Cellist =

1934 short story by Kenji Miyazawa

- 1982 Japanese edition, with artwork from the 1982 film
- Author: Kenji Miyazawa
- Original title: セロ弾きのゴーシュ Sero Hiki no Gōshu
- Translator: John Bester
- Language: Japanese
- Genre: Fantastic, juvenile, philosophical, parable
- Publication date: 1934
- Publication place: Japan
- English publication date: 1994
- Media type: Novel

Gauche the Cellist (セロ弾きのゴーシュ, Sero Hiki no Gōshu; also transliterated Gorsch the Cellist or Goshu the Cellist) is a short story by the Japanese author Kenji Miyazawa. It is about Gauche, a struggling small-town cellist who is inspired by his interactions with anthropomorphized animals to gain insight into music. The story has been translated into English, Italian and Spanish, and was adapted into a critically acclaimed animated film in 1982 by Isao Takahata. It had previously been adapted to the screen several times.

== Synopsis ==
Gauche is a diligent but mediocre cellist who plays for a small-town orchestra, The Venus Orchestra (金星音楽団, Kinsei Ongaku Dan), and the local cinema in the early 20th century. He struggles during rehearsals and is often berated by his conductor during preparations for an upcoming performance of Beethoven's Sixth Symphony (the Pastoral Symphony).

Over the course of four nights, Gauche is visited at his mill house home by talking animals as he is practicing. The first night, a tortoiseshell cat came to Gauche and, giving him a tomato, asked him to play Schumann's "Träumerei". Gauche was irritated, as the tomato was from his garden outside, so he berated the cat and instead played "Tiger Hunt in India" (Michio Mamiya). This startled the cat and made it leap up and down in astonishment. The cat ran away in fright.

The second night as he was practicing, a cuckoo came to him asking to practice scales to Gauche's cello accompaniment. Gauche repeatedly played "cuckoo, cuckoo", accompanied by the bird. Eventually, he felt that the cuckoo's song was better than his cello. Gauche chased the bird away, causing it to fly into his window, hitting its head.

The third night as he was practicing, a Japanese raccoon dog came to him asking to practice the timpani to Gauche's cello accompaniment. As Gauche played "The Merry Master of a Coach Station", the tanuki hit the cello with a drum stick. The tanuki pointed out to Gauche that he played slowly despite trying to play speedily. The two left on good terms as the day broke.

The fourth night as he was practicing, a mother mouse came in with her baby, asking him to heal her sick son. When Gauche told her that he wasn't a doctor, she replied that the sound of his music had already healed a number of animals. Gauche put the sick little mouse into a hole of his cello and played a rhapsody. When Gauche finished, the little mouse became fine and was able to run around. The mother mouse cried and thanked Gauche, and left.

The Sixth Symphony concert was a great success. In the dressing room, the conductor asked a surprised Gauche to play an encore. Upon hearing the applauding audience, Gauche thought he was being made a fool of and again played "Tiger Hunt in India". Afterward, everybody in the dressing room congratulated him.

When he came back to his house, he opened the window where the cuckoo had hit its head and felt sorry for his actions. The ending scenes shows the animals and Gauche at peace, playing to the music of the Pastoral symphony.

== Adaptations ==
In 1982, the novel was adapted into an animated feature film by a Japanese animation studio, Oh! Production. It was directed and written for the screen by Isao Takahata, who would later found Studio Ghibli with Hayao Miyazaki. Kōichi Murata was the executive producer. Gauche's voice actor was Hideki Sasaki and the cat's voice actor was Fuyumi Shiraishi. The lead key animator, Shunji Saida, took cello lessons so that he could accurately capture finger movements. The 63 minute film took 6 years to complete and was highly acclaimed as one of the best film adaptations of Miyazawa's works.

A Region 2 NTSC DVD was released in Japan in 2000 by Pioneer with English subtitles. Pioneer re-released for the Japanese market in 2003. A Region 2 PAL DVD was released in France by L.C.J. in 2001, containing a French audio track. Studio Ghibli and Buena Vista Home Entertainment re-released it as a double-disc DVD in 2006, the 110th anniversary of Miyazawa's birth (Ghibli released its adaptation of Kenji Miyazawa's Taneyamagahara no Yoru on the same date). The 2006 release contained Dolby Digital audio and English subtitles.

The story had previously been adapted for the screen three times, in 1949, 1953 and 1963. The 1949 adaptation was animated and directed by Yoshitsugu Tanaka and produced by Ichirou Ono of Nippon Eiga (Japanese: 日本映画). The 1953 adaptation was produced using puppets and dolls and was directed by Kenjiro Morinaja. The 1963 adaptation was animated and directed by Matsue Jinbo, and produced by Masatsugu Hara of Gakken Eiga Kyoku.

== Translations ==
Youko Matsuka's English translation

Gauche the Cellist was translated into English by John Bester, along with several other short stories, in Once and Forever, the Tales of Kenji Miyazawa, published by Kodansha International in 1994. It was released in both hardcover (ISBN 4770017804) and paperback (ISBN 4770021844) editions.

It has also been translated into English by Roger Pulvers and published in Japan by the Labo Teaching Instruction Center (ISBN 978-4898110072).

Youko Matsuka translated the work into simplified English and published it in Japan through her Matsuka Phonics Institute (ISBN 978-4896432213) under the title "Gorsch the Cellist".

The work has also been translated into Italian by Muramatsu Mariko, along with other works, in Il violoncellista Goshu e altri scritti, published by La Vita Felice in 1987 (ISBN 8886314779).
