= Norio Shioyama =

Japanese animator and illustrator (1940–2017)

- Born: March 28, 1940; Kumamoto Prefecture, Japan
- Died: April 13, 2017 (aged 77); Misato, Saitama Prefecture, Japan
- Occupations: Animator, illustrator, character designer, animation director
- Notable work: Armored Trooper Votoms

Norio Shioyama (塩山 紀生, Shioyama Norio; 28 March 1940 – 13 April 2017) was an animator, illustrator, character designer, and animation director born in Kumamoto Prefecture, Japan. He is most well known for his work as character designer on the anime television series Armored Trooper Votoms. Shioyama, along with Kōichi Murata, Kazuo Komatsubara, and Kōshin Yonekawa, was one of the founding members of the animation studio Oh! Production.

== Profile ==
In 1961, Shioyama moved to Tokyo. In 1966, he joined Hatena Pro under the direction of Bonjin Nagaki. After helping to found Oh! Production in 1970, Shioyama left to become a freelancer, doing work for Tatsunoko Pro and working on many projects for Sunrise as an animation director.

Shioyama's first project as a character designer was for Invincible Steel Man Daitarn 3, which anime director Ryōsuke Takahashi praised. Shioyama then worked on such shows as Fang of the Sun Dougram as animation production chief, and Armored Trooper Votoms, Panzer World Galient, and Ronin Warriors as both character designer and animation production chief. Together with Takahashi, he and his designs epitomized Sunrise's work in the 1980s.

On April 13, 2017, a fire occurred at 1:00 AM, destroying his eighth-floor apartment in a 14-floor danchi in Misato, Saitama Prefecture. Shioyama and his wife Tokiko were both found dead; he was 77 years old.

== Awards ==
Shioyama received multiple awards and recognition throughout his career. Those listed here are chronological, with the oldest at the top.

- First place, Most Popular Male Character: Chirico Cuvie from Armored Trooper Votoms (1984, 6th Anime Grand Prix in Animage magazine)
- Best Work Award (最優秀作品賞, Saiyūgūshū Sakuhin Shō) for Armored Trooper Votoms: The Last Red Shoulder (1985, 2nd Japan Anime Grand Award • Atom Award)
- Readers Award for Yoroiden Samurai Troopers (1990, 13th Anime Grand Prix, Animage magazine)
- Fan Grand Award, Sakuhin Award for Yoroiden Samurai Troopers (1990, 7th Japan Anime Grand Award • Atom Award)
- Fan Grand Award, Male Character Award for Ryō Sanada/Wildfire Ryō from Yoroiden Samurai Troopers (1990, 7th Japan Anime Grand Award • Atom Award)

== Animation works ==
Listed alphabetically in chronological order (oldest at top).

=== TV ===
- Star of the Giants (1968–1971, key animation)
- Attack No. 1 (1969–1971, key animation)
- Tiger Mask (1969–1971, key animation)
- Science Ninja Team Gatchaman (1972–1974, key animation)
- Casshan (1973–1974, animation director, key animation)
- Brave Raideen (1975, animation director)
- Tekkaman: The Space Knight (1975, key animation)
- Combattler V (1976–1977, animation director)
- Voltes V (1977–1978, animation director)
- Daimos (1978, animation director)
- Invincible Steel Man Daitarn 3 (1978–1979, character designer, animation director)
- Daltanius (1979–1980, animation director)
- Trider G7 (1980, animation director)
- Saikyō Robo: Daioja (1981, animation director)
- Fang of the Sun Dougram (1981–1983, animation production chief, sub-character design)
- Shiroi Kiba: White Fang Monogatari (1982, key animation)
- Armored Trooper Votoms (1983–1984, character design, animation production chief)
- Panzer World Galient (1984–1985, character design, animation production chief)
- The Centurions (1986, character design, animation director)
- Metal Armor Dragonar (1987, key animation)
- Yoroiden Samurai Troopers (1988–1989, character design (with Akihiro Kanayama), chief animation director for opening and ending animation (last half of series))
- Mobile Suit Victory Gundam (1993, key animation)
- Yamiyo no Jidaigeki Rō no Saka (1995, character design, key animation (original illustrations))
- Jūsenshi Gulkeeva (1995, key animation, opening/ending/DN animation)
- The King of Braves GaoGaiGar (1997–1999, design work (with Tatsuya Suzuki of Seta), key animation)
- Infinite Ryvius (1999, key animation)
- InuYasha (2001–2004, design work, key animation)
- Onmyō Taisenki (2004–2005, key animation)
- Yakitate!! Japan (2004–2006, key animation)

=== Video games ===
- Armored Troopers Votoms: The Battling Road (1993, character design)
- Armored Troopers Votoms: Lightning Slash (1999, character design)
- Sunrise Eiyūtan (1999, character key animation (with Yoshikazu Yasuhiko, others))
- Sunrise Eiyūtan R (2000, character key animation (with Yoshikazu Yasuhiko, others))
- Sunrise Eiyūtan 2 (2001, character key animation (with Yoshikazu Yasuhiko, others))

=== Internet broadcast ===
- Kengō Retsuden #01: Hiken Tsubame Kaeshi (2006, original creator, animation)

=== OVA ===
- Armored Trooper Votoms: The Last Red Shoulder (1985, character design, animation director)
- Armored Troopers Votoms Vol.I: Stories of the A.T.Votoms (1985, character design, new footage key animation)
- Armored Troopers Votoms Vol.II: Highlights of the A.T.Votoms (1985, character design, ending animation, new footage key animation)
- Armored Troopers Votoms: Big Battle (1986, character design, animation director)
- Armored Troopers Votoms: Kumen (1986, character design)
- Armored Troopers Votoms: Udo (1986, character design)
- Panzer World Galient Part I: Earth Chapter (1986, character design)
- Panzer World Galient Part II: Sky Chapter (1986, character design)
- Panzer World Galient Part III: Iron Crest (1986, character design, animation director)
- Armored Troopers Votoms: Kuento (1988, ending animation)
- Armored Troopers Votoms: The Red Shoulder Document: Roots of Ambition (1988, character design, animation director)
- Armored Troopers Votoms: Sansa (1988, ending animation)
- Yoroiden Samurai Troopers Gaiden (1989, character design)
- Yoroiden Samurai Troopers: Legend of Kikoutei (1989–1990, character design, animation director (with Shukō Murase))
- Eiyū Gaiden Mosaica (英雄凱伝モザイカ) (1991, original creator, character design, supervising animation director, storyboards, key animation)
- Samurai Troopers in Message (1991, character design, animation director)
- Armored Troopers Votoms: Shining Heresy (1994, character design, supervising animation director)
- Yamiyo no Jidaigeki: Bakumatsu Rakuchū Kawaraban (1995, character design, key animation, animation director)
- The King of Braves GaoGaiGar Final (1999, key animation)
- Armored Trooper Votoms: Pailsen Files (2007–2008, Character Design, Key Animation)

=== Film ===
- Tiger Mask: Fukumen League-sen (1970, key animation)
- Document: Fang of the Sun Dougram (1983, character design (with Sōji Yoshikawa), animation director, new footage key animation (with Moriyasu Taniguchi))
- Japan Sunrise Anime Festival (1986, character designs and animation director for Armored Trooper Votoms: The Red Shoulder)
- Neo Heroic Fantasia Arion (1986, image boards (with Yoshikazu Yasuhiko), key animation)
- Yoroiden Samurai Troopers: Legend of Kikoutei (1990, character design, animation director (with Shukō Murase))
- Mobile Suit Gundam F91 (1991, key animation)
- InuYasha the Movie: Affections Touching Across Time (2001, key animation)
- InuYasha the Movie: The Castle Beyond the Looking Glass (2002, key animation)
- InuYasha the Movie: Swords of an Honorable Ruler (2003, key animation)

== Illustration works ==
Listed alphabetically in chronological order (oldest at top).

=== Novels ===
- Fang of the Sun Dougram 1, by Hiroyuki Hoshiyama (October 1983, Asahi Sonorama)
- Fang of the Sun Dougram 2, by Hiroyuki Hoshiyama (March 1984, Asahi Sonorama)
- Armored Troopers Votoms: The First Red Shoulder, by Sōji Yoshikawa (June 1988, Tokuma Shoten)
- Armored Troopers Votoms: The Last Red Shoulder, by Sōji Yoshikawa (June 1988, Tokuma Shoten)
- Seijūshi Glint vol.1-3, by Yoshitake Suzuki (July 1991 - March 1993, Asahi Sonorama)
- Ake-Ō Hōkōden 1: Gekishin no Hatō, by Masanori Hama (January 1991, Tairiki Shobō)
- Mosaica, by Ryōsuke Takahashi (August 1992, Fujimi Shobo)
- Kōkoku no Shugosha vol.1-7, by Daisuke Satō (June 1998 - September 2001, Chūō Kōron Shinsha)
- Yoroiden Samurai Troopers: Eikonhen, by Yoshie Kawahara (July 1989, Keibunsha)
- Yoroiden Samurai Troopers: Kankonhen, by Yoshie Kawahara (July 1989, Keibunsha)
- Yoroiden Samurai Troopers: Kikōtei Densetsu, by Mamoru Hamatsu (April 1990, Keibunsha)
- Armored Troopers Votoms I: Udo-hen, by Ryōsuke Takahashi (November 2002, Kadokawa Shoten)
- Armored Troopers Votoms II: Kumen-hen, by Ryōsuke Takahashi (February 2003, Kadokawa Shoten)
- Armored Troopers Votoms III: Sansa-hen, by Ryōsuke Takahashi (June 2003, Kadokawa Shoten)
- Armored Troopers Votoms IV: Kuento-hen, by Ryōsuke Takahashi (October 2003, Kadokawa Shoten)

=== CD drama ===
- Armored Troopers Votoms, by Ryōsuke Takahashi (December 1988, Asahi Sonorama cassette 21)
- Yoroiden Samurai Troopers Memorials Deluxe, includes illustration book and video (June 1991, Sunrise, Movic)
- CD Drama Collections: Sangokushi vol.1-8 (June 1992 - March 1994, character designs, illustration, Koei)
- CD Drama Collections: Sangokushi: Highlights #1 (August 1994, character designs, illustration, Koei)
- CD Drama Collections: Sangokushi: Zhuge Liang Seiranden vol.1-4 (March - December 1995, character designs, illustration, Koei)
- Armored Troopers Votoms Digital Memorials 1 (October 1999, CD-ROM, Movic)
- CD Drama Collections: Sangokushi DX (2003-03-26, character designs, illustration, Koei)
- Onmyō Taisenki OP "Kimi to nara" ED "Sora Kakeagaru" Special Limited Edition (Onmyō Tōshinpu illustrations)

=== Manga ===
- Shin Yoroiden Samurai Troopers, created by Hajime Yatate and Izumi Nikaidō, written by Yūji Hosoi, armor design by Hideo Okamoto (Shioyama is credited with the original character designs at the end of the book) (December 1992, Kodansha)

=== Collections ===
- Shioyama Norio no Sekai: Odyssey (published in Hobby Japan from January 1987 through January 1988)
- Shioyama Norio Gashū (October 1996, Movic)
- Eikyū Hozonban: Shioyama Norio Artwork Kessakusen (March 2002, Village Center Publishing)

=== Silk screen artwork ===
These silk screen prints are available through the Eagle Gallery and Art Collection House KK.

From Armored Troopers Votoms and published in 2001 (all measurements in centimeters, listed width x height):

- Shuttatsu (出立) (33.2 × 48.9)
- Shijima (静寂) (64.4 × 44.8)
- Senmu (戦夢) (64.2 × 32.3)
- Kizuna (絆) (34.8 × 49.9)
- Ketsuzen (蹶然) (44.8 × 64.8)
- Sōei (蒼影) (64.8 × 44.8)

=== Original works gallery showings ===
Shioyama Norio Gengaten ~The World of Armored Trooper Votoms~
Nagoya, 22–24 September 2001, Nadia Park Design Center Building, 3F Design Hall
Fukuoka, 27 September - 1 October 2001, Club AS Galleria Arch, Galleria Arch Fukuoka
