= Kokuchūkai =

Nichiren Buddhist group

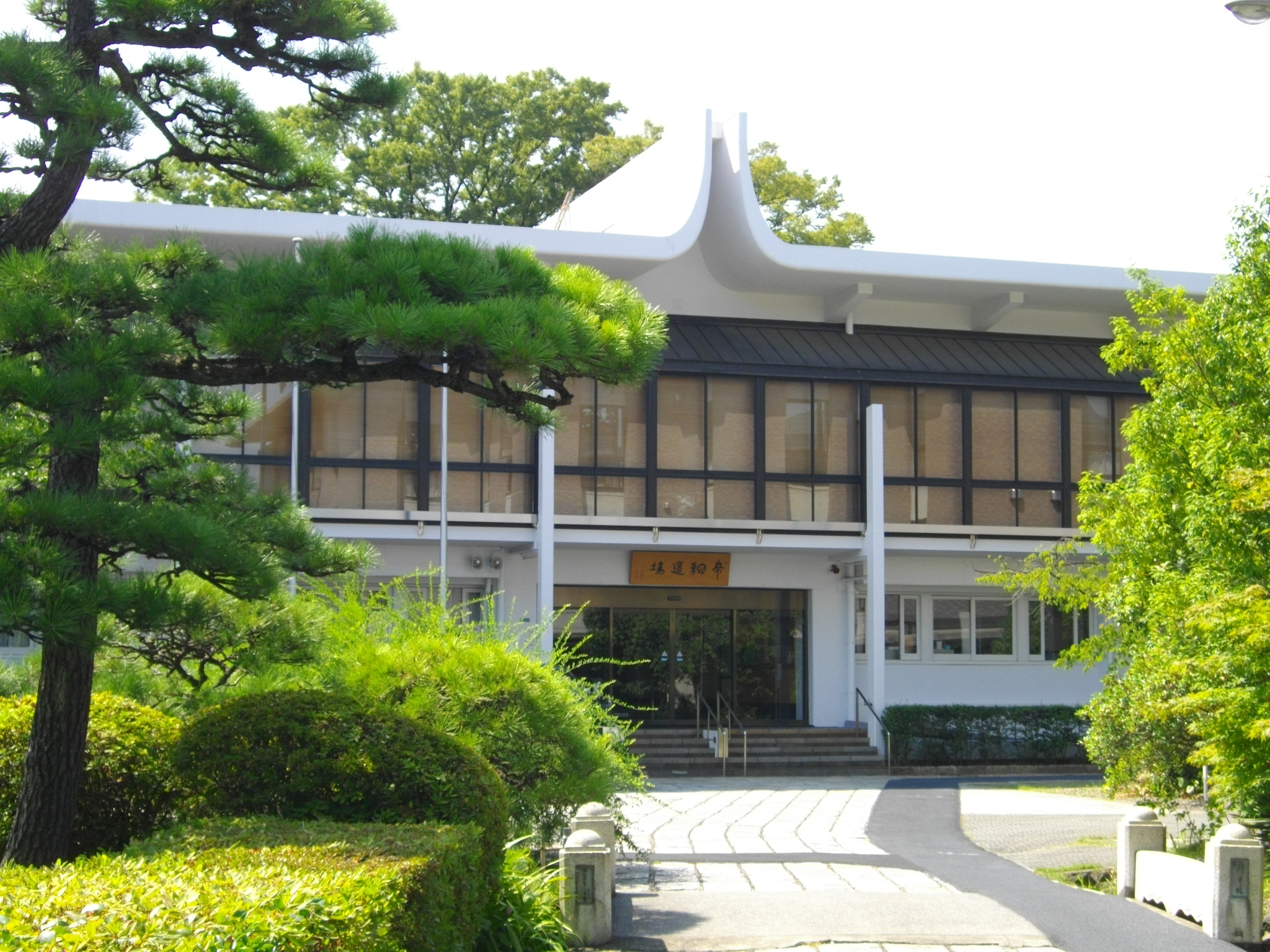
Kokuchūkai Headquarters

The Kokuchūkai (国柱会; "Pillar of the Nation Society") is a lay-oriented Nichiren Buddhist group. It was founded by Tanaka Chigaku in 1880 as Rengekai (蓮華会; "Lotus Blossom Society") and renamed Risshō Ankokukai (立正安国会) in 1884 before adopting its current name in 1914.

== History ==
The lay Nichiren Buddhist organization now known as the Kokuchūkai was founded by Tanaka Chigaku in 1880 as Rengekai ("Lotus Blossom Society") and renamed Risshō Ankokukai in 1884 before adopting its current name in 1914. The group's modern name is derived from a passage in the Kaimoku-shō, a writing of the founder of Nichiren Buddhism, the 13th-century monk Nichiren, which reads "I will be the pillar of Japan" (われ日本の柱とならん, ware nihon no hashira to naran).

Originally based in Yokohama, the group shifted its head office to Tokyo, Kyoto-Osaka, Kamakura and Miho, Shizuoka Prefecture before finally moving back to Tokyo. The group is currently based in Ichinoe, Edogawa-ku.

== Teachings ==
Among the group's principal teachings are to return to the teachings Nichiren and unite the various sects of Nichiren Buddhism. The group's teachings are characterized by a strong form of Nichirenism.

The group's sacred text is the Lotus Sutra and their main object of reverence is the Sado Shigen Myō Mandara (佐渡始原妙曼荼羅), a mandala supposedly made by Nichiren on the island of Sado.

== Membership ==
At its height in 1924, the group's membership was estimated at over 7000. The literary figures Takayama Chogyū and Kenji Miyazawa were members of the Kokuchūkai for a time. The group's official website continues to claim them, but they ultimately rejected Tanaka's nationalistic views.

== Publications ==
The group's publications include the monthly magazines Nichiren-shugi (日蓮主義; "Nichirenism") and Shin-sekai (真世界; "True World").

== Works cited ==
- Nakahira, Senzaburō (1994). "Kokuchūkai". Encyclopedia Nipponica (in Japanese). Shogakukan.
