= Kaze no Matasaburo =

Kaze no Matasaburō
- Film poster
- Directed by: Koji Shima
- Written by: Nagami Ryūzō; Ike Shintarō
- Based on: Kaze no Matasaburō by Kenji Miyazawa
- Starring: Akihiko Katayama; Akira Oizumi; Akiko Kazami
- Cinematography: Sōichi Aisaka
- Edited by: Masanori Tsujii
- Music by: Taizō Sugihara
- Production company: Nikkatsu
- Release date: October 10, 1940 (Japan)
- Running time: 96 minutes
- Country: Japan
- Language: Japanese

Kaze no Matasaburō (Japanese: 風の又三郎), also known in English as Matasaburo of the Wind, is a 1940 Japanese fantasy children's drama film directed by Koji Shima, based on Kenji Miyazawa's 1934 short story of the same name.

== Plot ==
Saburō Takada transfers from a city to a very small school. The village children suspect that Saburō is actually Matasaburō, the wind spirit.

== Cast ==
- Akihiko Katayama as Saburo Takada
- Akira Oizumi as Ichiro (Koichi)
- Akiko Kazami
- Ryūji Kita
- Hiroshi Hayashi as Grandfather of Ichiro
- Bontaro Miake

== See also ==
- Kenji Miyazawa
- Kaze no Matasaburo – Short story by Kenji Miyazawa
- Full text of an English translation of "Matasaburo of the Wind" (the original story on which the film is based on).
