= Kusano, Fukushima =

Dissolved municipality in Iwaki district, Fukushima prefecture, Japan

Kusano (草野村, Kusano-mura) was a village located in Iwaki District, Fukushima Prefecture, later Iwaki District (石城郡). It is currently the city of Iwaki, Fukushima Prefecture.

== Timeline ==
- October 1, 1954 – Merged into the city of Taira.

== See also ==
- List of dissolved municipalities of Japan
