= Tanaka Chigaku =

Japanese Nichiren buddhist and nationalist (1861–1939)

- 田中智學
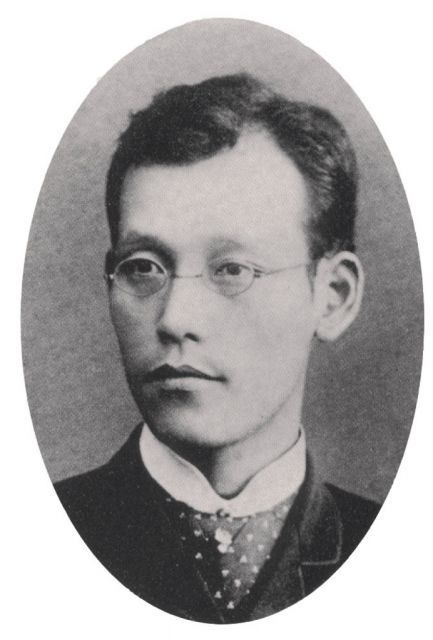
- Tanaka Chigaku around 1890
- Born: Tada Tomonosuke; December 14, 1861; Edo, Japan
- Died: November 17, 1939 (aged 77); Tokyo, Japan

Tanaka Chigaku (田中 智學; December 14, 1861 – November 17, 1939) was a Japanese Buddhist scholar and preacher of Nichiren Buddhism, orator, writer and ultranationalist propagandist in the Meiji, Taishō and early Shōwa periods. He is considered to be the father of Nichirenism, the fiercely ultranationalistic blend of Nichiren Buddhism and Japanese Nationalism espoused by such figures as Nissho Inoue, Kanji Ishiwara and Ikki Kita. Notably, however, the children's writer, poet, and rural activist Kenji Miyazawa also idolized Tanaka, and both Miyazawa and Ishiwara joined his flagship organization, the Kokuchūkai, in 1920.

== Early life ==
Born Tada Tomonosuke in Tokyo (then called Edo), the third son of a noted physician and former devotee of Pure Land Buddhism who had converted to Nichiren Buddhism, Tanaka was placed under the care of the Rev. Kawase Nichiren following the death of his parents in 1870. Enrolled as a novice at Kawase's temple, he later entered the Nichiren Buddhist academy of Daikyo-in (the predecessor to Rissho University), during which time he adopted the sobriquet "Chigaku", meaning "Wisdom and Learning".

However, during this time, Tanaka came to be disillusioned with the sect's leadership, who he considered too passive in their teachings, and in 1879 he abandoned the priesthood and set out to establish himself as a lay preacher of the "true" Nichiren Buddhism. Briefly employed at a German engineering company in Yokohama, he was quickly drawn to religious proselytizing, joining the lay organization Nichirenkai (日蓮会) as a preacher, in which capacity he honed his public speaking skills and developed his own distinct uncompromising Nichiren doctrine, which he came to refer to as "Nichirenism" (日蓮主義, Nichirenshugi).

== Evolution of spiritual-political philosophy ==
The 1890s saw Tanaka's spiritual philosophy evolve in an increasingly nationalistic manner, taking to concluding his works with the twin salutations of Namu Myōhō Renge Kyō "Homage to the Lotus Sutra" and "Imperial Japan for Ever and Ever" (日本帝国万々歳 (Nippon teikoku banbanzai)). The decade saw him carry out extensive lecturing tours throughout Japan and establish his Nichiren study group, Rissho Ankokukai (立正安国会) from his new base in Kamakura.

A noted anti-Christian and staunch opponent of Christian missionaries in Japan, he applauded Japan's triumph in the Russo-Japanese War in 1905, stating that "The war with Russia is divinely inspired to make Japanese citizens aware of their heavenly task." In 1908, he moved his base to Miho, Shizuoka Prefecture, where he would write his most famous work, "The Doctrine of Saint Nichiren" (日蓮聖人の教義 (Nichiren shonin no kyogi)) in 1911, in which he casts the radical 13th century priest Nichiren as the champion of the Japanese nation, and called for world unification through Nichirenism with the emperor as its core. "Japan's very purpose of existence," he writes, "is the implementation of this plan, as a country conceived for building Nichiren Buddhism."

In 1914, Tanaka amalgamated all of his followers into a single organization, the (国柱会 (Kokuchūkai, National Pillar Society) based in Miho. He would maintain a busy lecture schedule until illness curtailed his activities in the late 1930s, traveling not only throughout Japan but also embarking on speaking tours of Japanese-occupied Korea and Manchukuo, where he supported and gave lectures to Puyi, who had been appointed Emperor of Manchukuo. His nationalist and imperialist convictions only hardened with age, believing that Japan's 1931 takeover of Manchuria was divinely ordained and part of a divine plan to spread the "true" Nichiren Buddhism throughout Asia. He even went as far as to compile diagrams of the states in which the "Nichirenization" of the world would take place. By the 1950s he foresaw a total of 19,900 students, 19,200 instructors and 23,033,250 followers spread across the Asia-Pacific region reaching as far as New Zealand.

Tanaka was also a convinced anti-Semite who argued that Jews were fomenting social unrest in order to rule the world and that they advocated liberalism, especially within academic circles, as part of their plan to destroy the people's moral sense.

While best known as a preacher and an orator, Tanaka was also a skilled poet and dramatist with a keen interest in the traditional theatrical arts of Japan. He wrote and performed numerous plays, all with a heavily moralistic undertone, and produced a volume of essays, songs and poems.

Tanaka died in 1939 at the age of 79, and is entombed in the Myoshu Mausoleum in Tokyo. His son, Dr. Satomi Kishio, took over the reins of his organization, and remained a staunch defender of his father in the postwar era when numerous academics denounced him as a fascist for his ideology's links to such ultranationalist figures as Nissho and Kita.

== Sources ==
- 堀まきよう (Hori Makiyo), 「井上日召の`カギの折伏、：血盟団事件について」("Inoue Nissho and His Terrorist Ideology: Some Notes on the Blood-Pledge Corps Incident") in the Waseda Journal of Political Science and Economics (早稲田政治経済学雑誌) 328 (1996).
- Gerald Iguchi, Nichirenism as Modernism: Imperialism, Fascism, and Buddhism in Modern Japan (Ph.D. Dissertation), University of California, San Diego, 2006.
- Godart, G. Clinton, "Nichirenism, Utopianism, and Modernity: Rethinking Ishiwara Kanji’s East Asia League Movement," Japanese Journal of Religious Studies, 42/2: 235–274.
- Edwin Lee, "Nichiren and Nationalism: The Religious Patriotism of Tanaka Chigaku," in Monumenta Nipponica 30:1 (1975).
- Murakami Shigeyoshi. Japanese Religion in the Modern Century. Tokyo: University of Tokyo Press, 1908, pp. 19–32.
- 大谷栄一 (Ōtani Ei'ichi), 『近代日本の日蓮主義運動』(Modern Japan's Nichirenism Movement), Kyōto: Hōzōkan, 2001.
- George Tanabe Jr., "Tanaka Chigaku: The Lotus Sūtra and the Body Politic," in G. Tanabe, ed. The Lotus Sūtra in Japanese Culture. Honolulu: University of Hawai'i Press, 1989.
- 戸頃重基 (Tokoro Shigemoto), 『近代日本宗教とナショナリズム』(Modern Japanese Religion and Nationalism), Tokyo: Fuzanbo Press, 1966.
- Shizuoka Profiles: Tanaka Chigaku (En.).
- Kishio Satomi; Chigaku Tanaka, Discovery of Japanese Idealism, London: K. Paul, Trench, Trubner & Co.; New York: E.P. Dutton & Co., 1924.
- Montgomery, Daniel (1991). Fire in the Lotus, The Dynamic Religion of Nichiren, London: Mandala, ISBN 1852740914, pp. 217–218.

== See also ==
- Inoue Nissho
- Ishiwara Kanji
- Japanese nationalism
- Nichiren Buddhism
- Religion in Japan
