= Nisshō Inoue =

Japanese Buddhist preacher and nationalist (1887–1967)

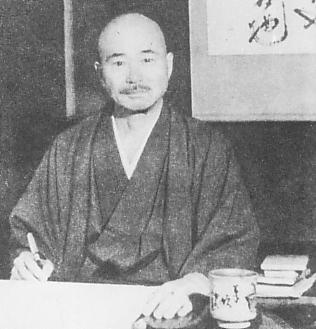
- Born: Inoue Shirō; April 12, 1887; Kawaba, Gunma, Empire of Japan
- Died: March 4, 1967 (aged 79); Kamakura, Japan

Nisshō Inoue (井上 日召, Inoue Nisshō; April 12, 1887 – March 4, 1967) was a Japanese Buddhist preacher of Nichirenism who founded the interwar Japanese fascist militant organization Ketsumeidan (血盟団, League of Blood). Contrary to popular belief, he was never an ordained Nichiren priest, but was rather a self-styled preacher whose extremist tenets were widely denounced by Japan's mainline Nichiren Buddhist establishment of the time.

== Biography ==
Inoue was born Inoue Shirō (later adopting the name Akira and then Nisshō, lit. “Called by the Sun”) in Kawaba, Gunma Prefecture, in 1887, the son of a rural doctor. Educated at Toyo Cooperative (present-day Takushoku University), he abandoned his studies and traveled to Manchuria where he spent time as a vagabond and ultimately found employment from 1909 to 1920 with the South Manchuria Railway. Upon his return to Japan, he first studied to become a Zen priest but then became a follower of Nichiren Buddhism, a conversion that led him to relocate to Miho, Shizuoka Prefecture, in order to study under the Nichiren scholar and nationalist preacher Tanaka Chigaku at his Kokuchukai Academy. Inoue met Aikido founder Morihei Ueshiba during this time period. Inoue soon became disillusioned with Tanaka's teachings, however, and in 1928 he relocated to Ōarai, Ibaraki, where he established his own temple, Risshō Gokokudō (立正護国堂, Righteous National Defense Temple), which also served as a youth training center, advocating a militarist revolution in Japan. During this time, with the assistance of former Lord Keeper of the Privy Seal of Japan Mitsuaki Tanaka, he became acquainted with such right wing figures as Shūmei Ōkawa and Ikki Kita, and received enthusiastic support from the radicalized young officers of the nearby Tsuchiura Naval Base.

In 1930, Inoue moved to Tokyo where he set about forming Ketsumeidan, recruiting members amongst university student radicals. Ketsumeidan was officially founded in 1932 together with a group of 13 young officers including Shō Onuma and Goro Hishinuma, establishing as its goal the overthrow of the political and economic elite of the time, with the motto “One Man, One Assassination.” The group's first wave of assassinations came in early 1932, when former finance minister Junnosuke Inoue was shot on February 9, as was the Director General of the Mitsui zaibatsu Baron Dan Takuma on March 5, collectively known as the League of Blood Incident. Inoue was arrested soon after the latter assassination, after which Koga Kiyoshi, a trusted subordinate, took over the reins of the group and set about organizing a second wave, which culminated in the May 15 assassination of Prime Minister Inukai Tsuyoshi, an event known as the May 15 Incident.

In the trial the Rinzai abbot Gempō Yamamoto testified in favor of his former disciple, justifying his violence from a Zen and imperialist point of view. Inoue and the three Ketsumeidan gunmen were sentenced to life imprisonment in November 1934, after the prosecution failed to obtain death sentences for them. The rest of the arrested group members given lighter sentences. Inoue was released from prison under an amnesty in 1940. Identified as a fascist by the US occupational forces, he was purged from public life in 1947. He was rehabilitated upon the end of the occupation of Japan and remained a prominent figure in right-wing activist circles in post-occupation Japan era until his death by stroke in 1967.

== See also ==
- Japanese nationalism
- Shōwa Restoration
- Criticism of Buddhism#Nationalism
- Buddhism and violence
