= Shinpei Kusano =

Japanese poet, author, and literary critic

- 草野心平
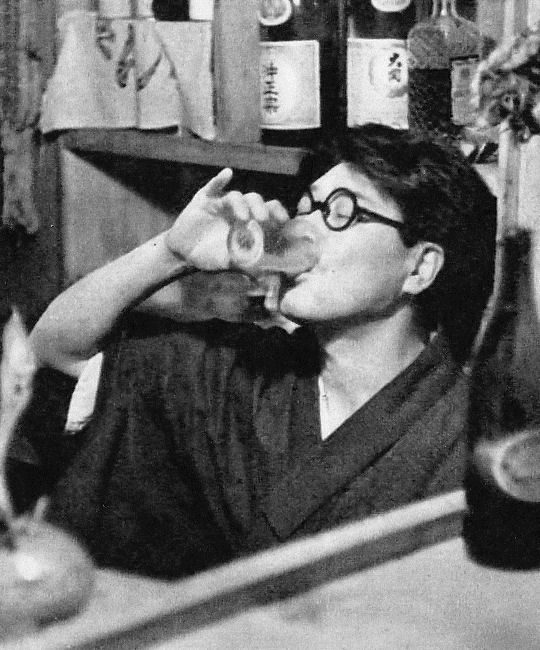
- Shinpei Kusano in 1955
- Born: Shinpei Kusano (草野心平); May 12, 1903; Iwaki, Fukushima, Japan
- Died: November 12, 1988 (aged 85); Tokorozawa, Saitama, Japan
- Education: Lingnan University
- Occupations: Poet, Writer
- Years active: 1928–1988

Shinpei Kusano (草野心平, Kusano Shinpei, 12 May 1903 – 12 November 1988) was a Japanese poet. He was born in Iwaki, Fukushima. He was a member of the Japan Art Academy, a Person of Cultural Merit, and a recipient of the Order of Culture.

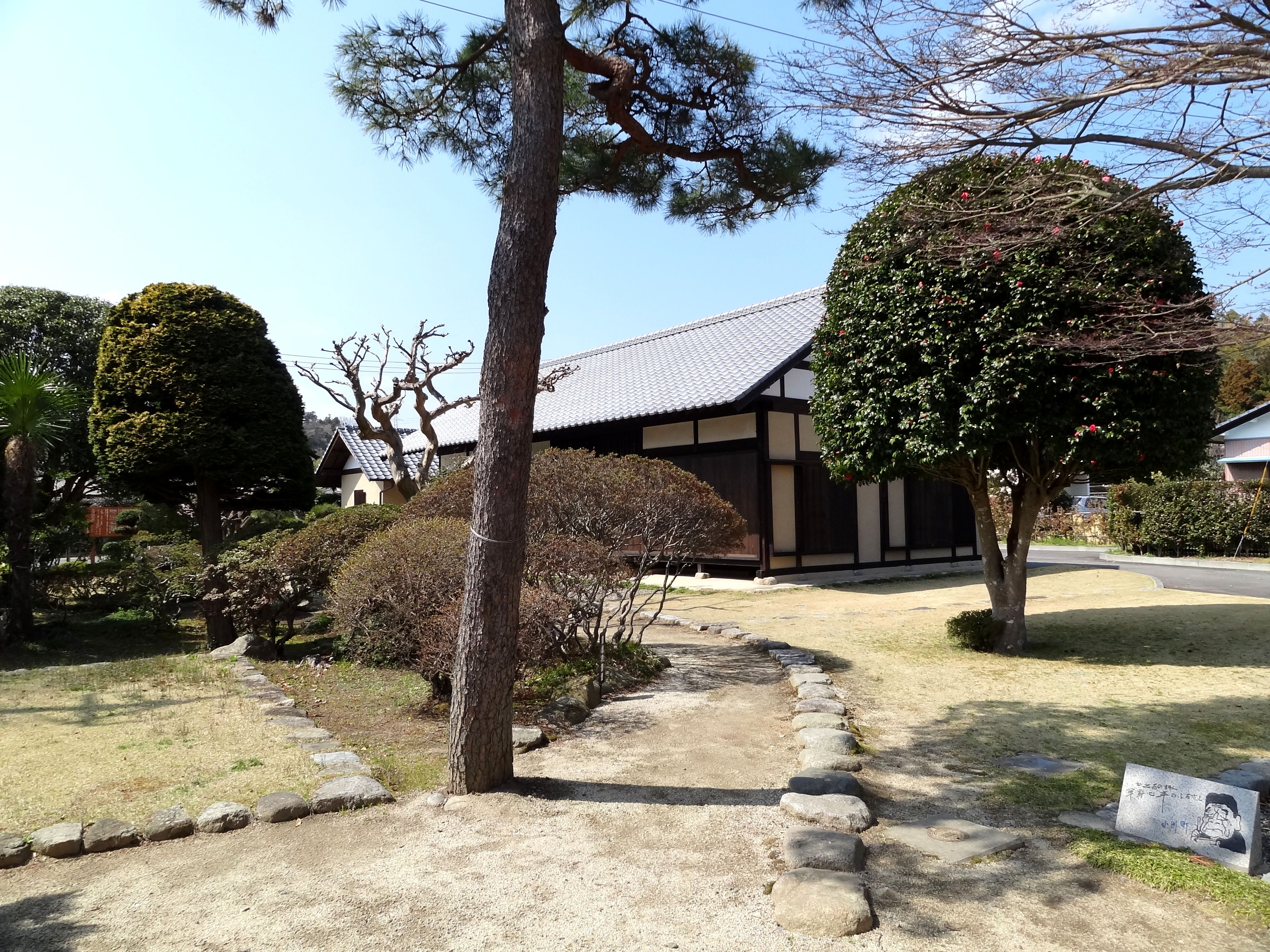
Shinpei Kusano's birthplace in Iwaki, Fukushima (2011)

After dropping out of Keio University, he studied art at Lingnan University in Guangdong, China, and published "The Hundredth Grade" in 1928, and joined "Rekitei", a poetry magazine founded by Itzumi Naokichi in 1935. Later, he became an advisor to the propaganda department of the Wang Zhaoming government in the Japanese puppet regime of Nanjing. Some critics have pointed out the influence of the regime's ideology in "Fuji" (1943), which was published in Nanjing. After the war, he republished "Rekitei" and trained many poets and loved frogs.

== Life and work ==
=== Early life ===
Born on May 12, 1903, in Kami-Ogawa Village, Ishiki District, Fukushima Prefecture, the second son of his father Kaoru Kusano and mother Tomeyo. In February 1911, his grandfather Kozo died at the age of 67. Kozo was a landowner who served as a member of the Fukushima prefectural assembly and village mayor.

In January 1916, his elder brother died of tuberculosis in Tokyo at the age of 16; in February, his mother died of pulmonary tuberculosis at the age of 46 while recuperating in Kami-Ogawa; in April, he entered Fukushima Prefectural Iwaki Junior High School (now Iwaki High School); in August, his sister died of typhoid fever at the age of 22.

In November 1919, he dropped out of Banjo Junior High School in the 4th grade and moved to Tokyo the following month, living with her father, stepmother, and younger siblings in a rented house in Shirayama-ue, Koishikawa.

In January 1921, he traveled to China. While working at the Guangdong Industrial Company, he studied English at the YMCA, and in September he entered Lingnan University in Guangzhou. 1922, influenced by a manuscript of poems left by his elder brother Minpei, he began writing poetry.

=== First collection of poems ===
In March 1923, he self-published "Horn of the Waste Garden," a collection of poems (the place of publication was Japan, as he was temporarily back in the country at the time). In September, he returned to Guangzhou from February to April 1924, he published mimeograph poems "Sky and Telephone Pole In June. In July, he published a mimeograph collection of poems, "Moon Eclipse and Fireworks" while returning home for summer vacation; in September, he entered the final course at Lingnan University and also began teaching a newly established Japanese course. In the same month, he published "BATTA", a collection of mimeograph poems. It was during this period of study that he began writing poetry. Shortly before returning to Japan, he read "Haru to Shura," a collection of poems by Kenji Miyazawa sent from Japan, and was greatly inspired by it.

In June 1928, he published his coterie magazine "Dongluo" with its 16th issue. In the same month, he married his stepmother's half-sister, and in September moved from Tokyo to Maebashi, Gunma Prefecture. In November, he published "Daihyaku-kyuu" (The Hundredth Grade), his first collection of poetry printed in letterpress. All of the poems were about frogs, and he continued to write poems dealing with other amphibians; in December, he published the first issue of the poetry magazine "Gakko".

=== Rekitei ===
In June 1929, he joined the Jomo Shimbun and worked in the proof department; in July, his first son was born; from around September, he interacted with Sakutaro Hagiwara, who had returned to Maebashi; in November 1930, he left the Jomo Shimbun and returned home.

In January 1931, he published "Amerika proletaria shishu" (American Proletarian Poetry Anthology) with other poets; in February, he moved to Tokyo and opened a yakitori stall in Azabu in May (closed the following May); in September, he published a mimeograph collection of poems, "Tomorrow is the Weather"; in 1932, He joined 'Jitsugyo no Sekai-sha', where he was in charge of editing and proofreading.

In January 1934, he edited and published "In Memoriam of Kenji Miyazawa" following Kenji Miyazawa's death the previous September. He never had a chance to meet Kenji before his death, but learned of his passing via Kotaro Takamura and visited his parents' home in Hanamaki following his death. In May, he joined Tokyo Nichi Nichi Shimbun (published by Jitsugyo no Nihonsha). In October, the first volume of "The Complete Works of Kenji Miyazawa" (Bunpodo Shoten), of which Shinpei was co-responsible editor, was published. The complete works were in three volumes, and in September the next year the collection was completed in three volumes.

=== Nanjing period ===
In December, he published a collection of poems entitled "Frogs". In February 1939, he held a party to commemorate the publication of "Frogs," which was attended by Tetsuzo Tanikawa, Sakutaro Hagiwara, and others. In November, he left Tokyo Nichi Nichi Shimbun and joined "Toa Kakuritsu Sha" the following month, becoming the editor-in-chief of Toa Kakuritsu.

In July 1940, at the invitation of the central government of the Republic of China (Nanjing government), he went to China as an advisor to the government's propaganda department. From July of the following year, he was accompanied by his family and spent about six years in Nanjing until 1946. He attended the Greater East Asia Literature Convention (Imperial Theater) as a representative of the Republic of China (Wang Zhoaming's regime), and when Wang Zhoaming's regime declared war on Britain and the United States in 1943, he published a poem entitled "Declaration of War" in the "Yomiuri Shimbun".

In July 1945, he was called up for military service by the army stationed in Nanjing and became an army private in August. In March 1946, he boarded the return ship LST from Shanghai and arrived at his birthplace on the 31st.

=== Rekitei reprinted ===
In July 1947, Shinpei reprinted "Rekitei"; in October, he opened a small rental library called "Tenzan" in front of Ogawago Station in his hometown; in 1948, he closed the library after eight months and moved to Tokyo by himself in August. In August 1949, he moved to Mount Mitake.

In January 1950, he won the first Yomiuri Literary Award (poetry category) for his series of "Frog Poems." In November, he became a director of the Japan Writers' Association. In March 1951, he was a member of the first selection committee for the Mr. H Prize established by the Japan Contemporary Poets Association.

In April 1954, he was elected secretary-general of the Japan Contemporary Poets Association. He serialized a novel about Wang Zhaoming in the Yomiuri Shimbun, titled "The Person of Destiny."

In 1956, a monument to Shinpei was erected by Hirabushi Swamp, where he would write and learn about frogs. And in September 1960, he became an honorary villager of Kawauchi, Fukushima.

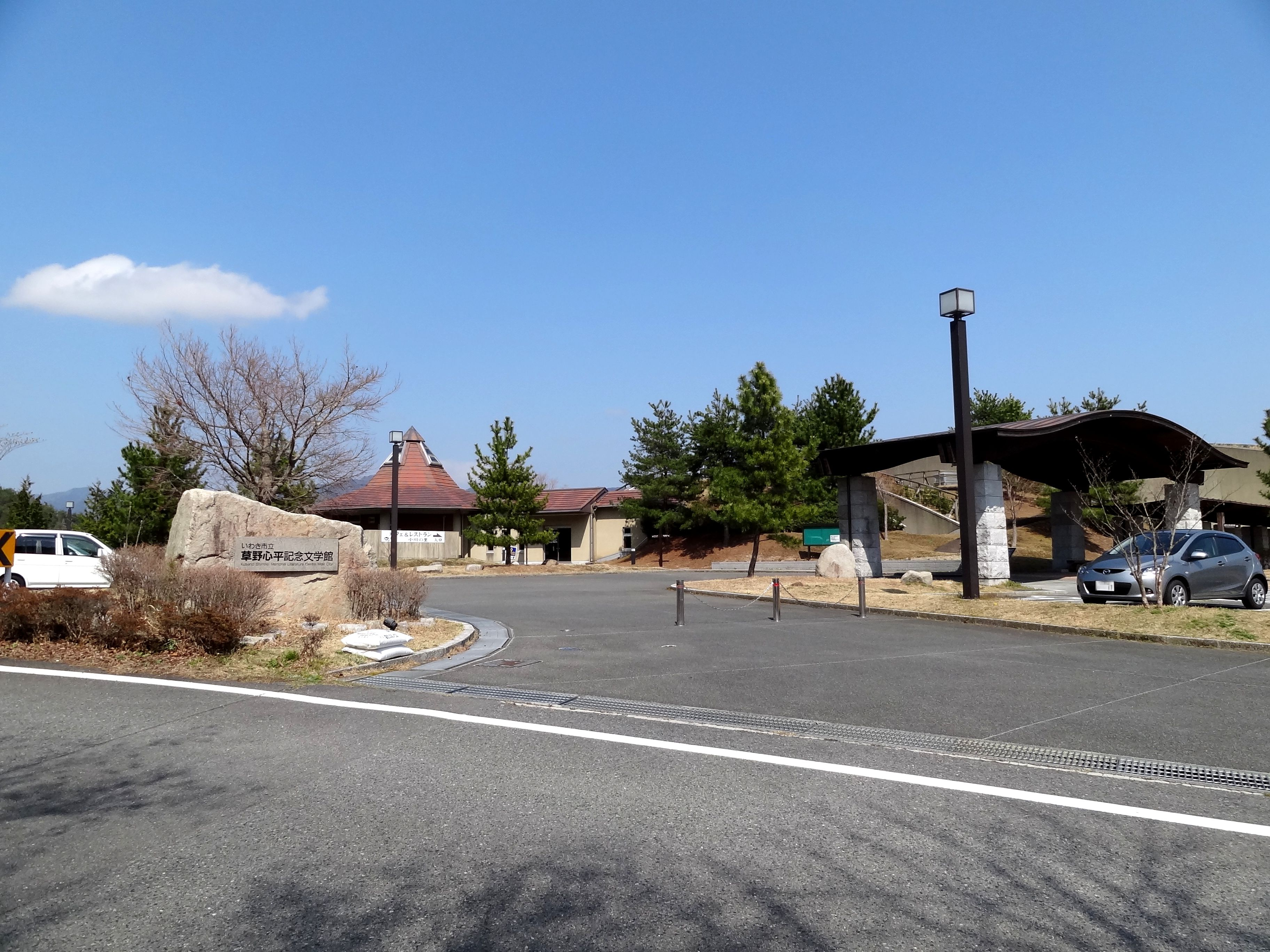
The Shinpei Kusano Memorial Centre in Iwaki City (2011)

In July 1966, the Tenzan Library, built as a prize for honorary Kawauchi Village residents, was completed.

=== Poetic Works ===
In January 1970, he received the 21st Yomiuri Literary Award for "Wagamama Kotaro" published the previous year. In June, he published a collection of poems, "Taiyo wa higashi kara aruki" (The Sun Rises in the East). In July, he was invited to the 37th International Pen Convention in Seoul, South Korea, together with Kawabata Yasunari.

In May 1973, "Kusano Shinpei Poetic Complete Works" (Chikuma Shobo) is published. 1974 In September, his wife, Ya-Mitsu, dies at the age of 66. From this year, he began publishing an "annual poetry collection" at the pace of one book a year, and by 1986 he had published 12 books of poetry. In 1975, he became a member of the Japan Art Academy.

In 1976, on March 29, a fire broke out in a neighboring house in Higashimurayama, Tokyo, burning Shinpei's house half to the ground. In April 1977, he was awarded the Order of the Sacred Treasure, 3rd class. 1978, May, "Kusano Shinpei Complete Works" was published by Chikuma Shobo and completed in 12 volumes in May 1984.

In October 1983, he became a Person of Cultural Merit, and in July 1984, he became an honorary citizen of Iwaki City.

== Last years ==
In June 1986, he published his last collection of poems, "Ji-Quan et al." In August, he suffered a stroke and was hospitalized, but was released in December. In March 1987, he suffered another stroke and was hospitalized, but was released in July and was hospitalized again in September. In October, he was asked by the Agency for Cultural Affairs to receive the Order of Cultural Merit, and in November he attended the ceremony in a wheelchair despite being in bad health conditions.

On November 12, 1988, he became ill at home and died of acute heart failure at the Tokorozawa Municipal Medical Center in Tokorozawa, Saitama Prefecture, where he was taken.
