= Nichirenism =

Japanese nationalist ideology based on Nichiren Buddhism

Nichirenism (日蓮主義, Nichirenshugi) is the nationalistic interpretation of the teachings of Nichiren. The most well-known representatives of this form of Nichiren Buddhism are Nissho Inoue, Tanaka Chigaku, and Honda Nisshō, who construed Nichiren's teachings according to the notion of Kokutai. It was especially Chigaku who "made innovative use of print media to disseminate his message" and is therefore regarded to have influenced Nichiren-based Japanese new religions in terms of methods of propagation.

== Overview ==
The term “Nichirenism” was originally coined by Chigaku Tanaka and first appeared in 1901 (Meiji 34) in Myōshū, the official journal of the Kokuchūkai (then known as the Risshō Ankokai). Tanaka defined it as follows:

“In religious terms, it is known as the Nichiren Sect, and with regard to the sutra upon which it is based, it has also been called the ‘Lotus Sect.’ However, intending to apply the term in a broader sense—extending beyond the standpoint of pure faith to encompass ideology and even one’s consciousness of daily life—I generalized it and coined the term ‘Nichirenism.’”

Thus, Nichirenism was an outward-looking movement that sought to expand the philosophy of Nichiren Buddhism beyond mere matters of faith into a wide range of social domains, including politics, economics, culture, and the arts. Chigaku argued that the traditional temple-parishioner system and the monk-centered framework could not accommodate this social dimension; therefore, from the standpoint of lay Buddhism, he established “Nichirenism” as the foundation underpinning all aspects of life and faith.

== Development ==
At the core of Nichirenism lay a deep-seated resistance to the pragmatist approach centered on “sesshu” (acceptance of all) advocated by figures such as Yutana-in Nikki, who represented the teachings of the Nichiren Shu Ichishi-ha school in the early modern period. Instead, it embraced the ideal of “shakubuku” (折伏, "break and subdue"), seeking to return to the proactive spirit of the founder, Nichiren, who repeatedly admonished the ruler to promote the widespread propagation of the Lotus Sutra to the exclusion of other sects. Consequently, the movement was actively engaged in influencing actual politics, and within the tide of Japan's modernization centered on the Emperor, it became deeply involved with nationalism and the ideology of the national polity. The sect, which had been in decline due to the influence of the anti-Buddhist movement, deepened its commitment to the strong political nature of Nichirenism in a manner aligned with the patriotic climate following Japan’s victories in the First Sino-Japanese War and the Russo-Japanese War.

Nichirenism was an original concept developed by Chigaku Tanaka of the Kokuchukai, but it also came to be widely adopted by Honda Nisshō of the Kenpon Hokke-shu, who was active in the Nichiren Buddhist reform movement, and even within the traditional sects centered on the historic Kuon-ji Temple at Mt. Minobu. Thus, the concept of Nichirenism sparked a major boom within the prewar Nichiren Buddhist community; however, because it became so widely disseminated, its originator, Chigaku Tanaka of the Kokuchukai, and his disciple, the Buddhist scholar Chio Yamakawa (who later founded the Honka Myoshu Renmei), sought to distinguish their own ideology as “Pure Nichirenism” from other forms of Nichirenism.

== Ideology ==
As noted above, by the prewar period, the term “Nichirenism” had become so overused that the ideology it represented had come to encompass a wide range of diversity. Even among the central figures of Nichirenism, Chigaku Tanaka and Honda Nisshō, there were significant ideological differences. Yoshio Senoo, a disciple of both, grew dissatisfied with their respective ideologies and went on to organize the “New Buddhist Youth Alliance” based on his own unique brand of socialist Nichirenism. Furthermore, Shimizu Ryozan, a priest of the Nichiren Sect, took Chigaku’s view of the national polity to its radical extreme and even advocated the “Emperor as the Original Buddha” theory. Thus, Nichirenism possesses three major characteristics:

1. First, it regards “Shakyamuni Buddha, the Eternal, Fully Realized, Greatly Benevolent Teacher” as described in the “Chapter on the Buddha’s Lifespan” of the Lotus Sutra as the fundamental object of faith. It aims to make Japan a true divine nation and to convert and enlighten the subjects and people of the world by having the Imperial Family take refuge in Nichiren—the Bodhisattva of True Enlightenment and the Incarnation of Shakyamuni Buddha, who received the Buddha’s mandate—as the Supreme Commander of the Universe.
2. The enlightened body of the Eternal Buddha in the Lotus Sutra is the Imperial Ancestral Deity itself; consequently, the Emperor, as a descendant of that deity, is the Eternal, Fully Realized Original Teacher. Therefore, the movement aims to achieve the conversion and enlightenment of all under heaven and the widespread propagation of the teachings with the Emperor as its spiritual leader.
3. Without being bound by the framework of Nichirenism as ultranationalism or Emperor-centered ideology described above, they remained faithful to the teachings of Shakyamuni Buddha, Nichiren, and the Lotus Sutra, and strive to promote social welfare and charitable activities to enlighten the people.

The ideology described in point one represents the fundamental prewar Nichirenist philosophy. It holds that even the Emperor cannot be a “wise king” unless he takes refuge in the True Law (the Lotus Sutra), and that the time of true widespread propagation is precisely when the Emperor, ministers, and the people all chant "Namu Myōhō Renge Kyō" together. Literally speaking, this was a faithful realization of the “Three Great Secret Laws” said to have been written by Nichiren. In particular, Ishihara Kanji, a member of the Kokuchukai who later developed his own interpretation of Nichiren’s teachings, acknowledged that Nichiren was overwhelmingly greater than the Emperor.

However, in prewar Japan, the notion that the Buddha and Nichiren were superior to the Emperor, and that even the Emperor was a target for conversion, provoked considerable backlash from staunch nationalists. This led to the emergence of the ideology described in point two, which held that the Imperial Ancestors and Imperial Lineage themselves were the Original Teachers of Eternal Realization, and that the Emperor was the Supreme Leader of the entire faith. At that time, the Nichiren Sect discovered a mandala principal image unearthed from a provincial temple that contained a description identifying the Emperor as the Chakravartin King (an ancestor of Shakyamuni). They presented this as a crucial principal image demonstrating that Nichiren held the belief that the Emperor was the True Buddha, and effectively acknowledged the theory of the Emperor as the True Buddha.

In response, however, scholars and researchers of the time, such as Shimizu Ryuzan (a different person from Shimizu Ryozan), pointed out inconsistencies with Nichiren’s thought and argued that the mandala was a forgery. It was later officially recognized as a forgery created by a later figure, and the Nichiren Sect, reflecting on its prewar accommodation of state nationalism, retracted not only the theory of the Emperor as the Original Buddha but also Nichirenism itself. The postwar history of Nichiren Buddhism’s doctrinal studies developed largely through reflection on and a comprehensive assessment of this “nationalist” Nichirenist movement. Although there is a significant difference between the first and second points, what they have in common is that, regardless of whether the “Supreme Commander” who enlightens sentient beings is Nichiren or the Emperor, the fact that both were born on the land of “Japan” inherently contains the ultranationalist assertion that “this is why Japan is the Land of the Gods.”

The character of the thired point developed primarily by eliminating excessive nationalistic traits, in response to the labor disputes, Taishō Democracy, and liberal movements that flourished during the Taishō era. At its center are figures such as the aforementioned Yoshio Senoo and Seifu Nagamatsu, who incorporated the lineage of the Nichiryu School (Happin-ha) and constructed a unique doctrine for the general public known as “genjo-riku” (demonstrable benefits), becoming the founder of the new religion, the Honmon Butsuryū-shū.

Nagamatsu’s Nichirenism was fundamentalist and purist; in contrast to the teachings of Chigaku and Nisshō, it deemed all acts associated with the national essence ideology, State Shinto, and shrine visits based on these principles to be blasphemous acts that contradicted Nichiren’s teachings. Although there is no direct connection, Tsunesaburō Makiguchi of the Soka Educational Society (later the Soka Gakkai), which shows indirect influence from Nichirenism, was arrested for violating the Public Order Maintenance Act after refusing to accept an amulet from Ise Grand Shrine.

== Present-day ==
Tanaka Chigaku, who sparked the Nichirenist movement, wrote The Reformation of the Sect (宗門の維新) to criticize the insularity of traditional sects. From a layperson’s perspective, he sought to carry out radical religious and political reforms. However, the nationalist ideology inherent in Chigaku’s and others’ thinking synergized with the nationalistic climate of prewar Japan, creating a complex environment in which even traditional sects rushed to embrace Nichirenism.

However, the situation reversed after the war. With the dismantling of the myth of the national polity by the GHQ—as exemplified by the Emperor’s Humanity Declaration, the foundation of Nichirenism’s faith collapsed, and many Nichiren-affiliated sects turned to a reexamination of Nichirenism itself in accordance with postwar democracy. Ironically, the method of broadly educating the masses through politics, economics, culture, and the arts, which Tanaka Chigaku had originally aimed for, was inherited by the Soka Gakkai and Reiyukai-affiliated sects that grew alongside the postwar system. In tandem with the increase in the working population during the period of high economic growth, this led to a boom in these sects. However, the activities of sects that still profess Nichirenism today—such as Tanaka Chigaku’s Kokuchukai and Yamakawa Chio’s Honge Myoshu Renmei, though they remain minor forces, continue to exist.

== See also ==
- Japanese nationalism
- Kanji Ishiwara
- Kokuchūkai
- League of Blood Incident
- May 15 Incident
- Shōwa Restoration

== Bibliography ==
- Iguchi, Gerald (2006). Nichirenism as Modernism: Imperialism, Fascism, and Buddhism in Modern Japan (Ph.D. Dissertation), University of California, San Diego.
- Satomi, Kishio (1923). Japanese Civilization, Its Significance and Realisation: Nichirenism and the Japanese National Principles, London, K. Paul, Trench, Trubner & co., ltd. Reprint: London: Routledge 2001. ISBN 0415245346.
