= Oh! Production =

Japanese animation studio

Oh! Production Ltd.
- Native name: 有限会社オープロダクション
- Romanized name: Yūgen-gaisha Ō Purodakushon
- Type: Yūgen-gaisha
- Industry: Anime
- Founded: May 1970; 56 years ago
- Founder: Norio Shioyama; Kōichi Murata; Kazuo Komatsubara; Kōshin Yonekawa
- Headquarters: Suginami, Tokyo, Japan
- Number of employees: 26 (as of 2009)
- Website: Official site

Oh! Production Ltd. (Japanese: 有限会社オープロダクション, Hepburn: Yūgen-gaisha Ō Purodakushon), sometimes credited as Oh! Pro or Oh-Pro, is an anime production studio in Amanuma, Suginami, Tokyo, Japan. It was established in May 1970 by animators Norio Shioyama, Kōichi Murata, Kazuo Komatsubara, and Kōshin Yonekawa.

== Former members ==
- Kazuo Komatsubara (deceased, founding member of Oh! Pro, animation director)
- Kitarō Kōsaka
- Norio Shioyama (deceased, founding member of Oh! Pro, animation director)
- Kazuhide Tomonaga (left in 1978, currently one of the head animation directors of Telecom Animation Film)

== Works ==
=== OVAs ===
- Devilman: The Birth (1987)
- Devilman: The Demon Bird (1990)

=== Films ===
- Furiten-kun (1981)
- Jarinko Chie (1981) (supporting animation)
- Gauche the Cellist (1982)
- Fair, then Partly Piggy (1988)
- Umi Da! Funade Da! Nikoniko, Pun (1990)
- La Maison en Petits Cubes (2008)

=== Game animation ===
- Tales of Symphonia (2003)
