= 1260s =

Decade

The 1260s is the decade starting January 1, 1260 and ending December 31, 1269.

== Events ==
=== 1260 ===
==== By place ====
====== Africa ======
- October 24 – Saif ad-Din Qutuz, Mamluk sultan of Egypt, is assassinated by Baibars, who seizes power for himself.
- The civil servant and bard longing for lost al-Andalus, Ibn al-Abbar, is burnt at the stake by the Marinid ruler.
- The Arba'a Rukun Mosque is completed in Mogadishu. The Arba'a Rukun Mosque (Arabic: أربع ركون), also known as Arba Rucun, is a mosque in the medieval district Shangani, Mogadishu, Somalia.

====== Asia ======
- April – The Japanese Shōgen era ends, and the Bun'ō era begins (to February 1261).
- May 5 – Kublai Khan becomes a claimant to the Mongol Empire, after the death of Möngke Khan.
- The Toluid Civil War begins between Kublai Khan and Ariq Böke, for the title of Great Khan.
- May 21 – Kublai sends his envoy Hao Jing to negotiate with Song dynasty Chancellor Jia Sidao, after the small force left by Kublai south of the Yangtze River is destroyed, by a Chinese army of the Southern Song dynasty. Chancellor Jia Sidao imprisons the entire embassy of Kublai. This slight will not be forgotten by Kublai, but he is unable to assault the Song, due to the civil war with his rival brother Ariq Böke.
- September 3 – Battle of Ain Jalut in Galilee: The Mamluks defeat the Mongols, marking their first decisive defeat, and the point of maximum expansion of the Mongol Empire. Isa ibn Muhanna is appointed amir al-ʿarab under the Mamluks.
- The Chinese era Jingding begins and ends in 1264 in the Southern Song dynasty of China (last era of Emperor Lizong).

====== Europe ======
- July 12 – Battle of Kressenbrunn: King Ottokar II of Bohemia captures Styria from King Béla IV of Hungary.
- July 13 – Livonian Crusade: The Baltic Samogitians and Curonians of the Grand Duchy of Lithuania decisively defeat the Livonian Order in the Battle of Durbe. This leads the Estonians of Saaremaa Island to once again rebel against the Livonian Order.
- September 4 – Battle of Montaperti: The Sienese Ghibellines, supported by the forces of King Manfred of Sicily, defeat the Florentine Guelphs.
- September 20 – Second of the two major Prussian uprisings by the Old Prussian tribe of Balts against the Teutonic Order begins.
- The Duchy of Saxony is divided into Saxony-Lauenberg and Saxony-Wittenberg, marking the end of the first Saxon state.
- War breaks out in the Valais (in modern-day Switzerland), as the Bishopry of Sion defends against an invasion by the County of Savoy.
- Croatia is divided into two sub-regions ruled by ban: the Croatian region on the south and Slavonian region on the north, by King Béla IV of Hungary.

==== By topic ====
====== Arts and culture ======
- October 24 – The Cathedral of Chartres is dedicated in the presence of King Louis IX of France (the cathedral is now a UNESCO World Heritage Site).
- Jacobus de Voragine compiles his work, the Golden Legend, a late medieval best-seller.
- The mosaic Christ between the Virgin and St Minias is made on the facade of Florence's Basilica di San Miniato al Monte.
- German musical theorist Franco of Cologne publishes Ars Cantus Mensurabilis, in which he advances a new theory of musical notation, in which the length of a musical note is denoted by the shape of that note, a system still used today.
- Construction begins on the Dunkeld Cathedral in Perthshire, Scotland.
- Construction begins on the cathedrals at Meißen and Schwerin.
- Nicola Pisano sculpts the pulpit in the Pisa Baptistery.

====== Religion ======
- The newly formed Sukhothai Kingdom of Thailand adopts Theravada Buddhism.
- The advent of the Age of the Holy Spirit predicted by Joachim of Fiore, according to his interpretation of the Book of Revelation, chapter 6.

=== 1261 ===
==== By place ====
====== Byzantine Empire ======
- March 13 – Treaty of Nymphaeum: Emperor Michael VIII Palaiologos signs a trade and defense agreement with the Republic of Genoa, to counterweight the Venetian presence in the region. Genoa agrees to ally with the Empire of Nicaea, by providing a fleet of up to 50 galleys during the projected Nicaean siege of Constantinople, while 16 galleys are to be immediately sent against the Latin Empire.
- July – Michael sends his general Alexios Strategopoulos with a small advance force of 800 soldiers, most of them Cumans, to keep watch on the Bulgarians and scout the defending positions of the Latin forces in the surroundings of Constantinople. When they reach the village of Selymbria, Strategopoulos is informed by local farmers that the entire Latin garrison and the Venetian fleet, are absent conducting a raid against the Nicaean island of Daphnousia. He decides not to lose such a golden opportunity and makes plans (without the consent of Michael) to retake the capital.
- July 25 – Reconquest of Constantinople: Alexios Strategopoulos and his men hide at a monastery near the city gates, before entering through a secret passage. After a short struggle, the guards who are completely taken by surprise are killed and the Venetian quarter is set ablaze. Panic spreads through the capital and Emperor Baldwin II rushes out to save his life, evacuating along with many other Latins with the help of the Venetian fleet. Baldwin manages to escape to the still Latin-held parts of Greece, but Constantinople is lost for good.
- August 15 – Michael enters Constantinople in triumph and is crowned as emperor of the Byzantine Empire at the Hagia Sophia. To solidify his claim, the legitimate ruler, John IV Laskaris, is blinded on Michael's orders on December 25, his 11th birthday. Michael banishes him to a monastery and marries his two sisters to lesser Latin and Bulgarian nobles in an attempt to wipe out the Laskarid dynasty.

====== Mongol Empire ======
- Kublai Khan releases 75 Chinese merchants who were captured along the border of the Mongol Empire. By doing this, Kublai hopes to bolster his popularity and depend on the cooperation of his Chinese subjects to ensure that his army receives more resources.

====== Levant ======
- June 13 – Al-Mustansir II becomes the first Abbasid ruler in Cairo (after his escape during the Siege of Baghdad). He is sent with an army by Sultan Baibars to recover Baghdad, but is killed in a Mongol ambush near Anbar (modern Iraq), on November 28. The Abbasid caliphs continue as religious figureheads for the Mamluks in Egypt until the 16th century.

====== British Isles ======
- June 12 – King Henry III of England obtains a papal bull to absolve himself from his oath to maintain the Provisions of Oxford. He hires an army of 300 French knights as a bodyguard and takes up position in the Tower of London. He dismisses the baronial officials (led by Simon de Montfort) who wish the royal power to be modified by the principle of representation. This sets the stage for the Second Barons' War.
- August – Battle of Callann in Ireland: Norman forces under John FitzThomas are defeated by a Gaelic army led by King Fínghin Mac Carthaigh. John FitzGerald is killed during the fighting.

====== Asia ======
- February – The Japanese Bun'ō era ends and the Kōchō era begins during the reign of the 11-year-old Emperor Kameyama (until 1264).

==== By topic ====
====== Education ======
- Early – Following disputes, northern academics from the University of Cambridge in England set up a University of Northampton by royal charter but it is suppressed by the Crown in 1265.

====== Literature ======
- The earliest extant Chinese illustration of "Pascal's Triangle" is from Yang Hui's (or Qianguang's) book Xiangjie Jiuzhang Suanfa, published this year.

====== Religion ======
- May 25 – Pope Alexander IV dies after a pontificate of 6-years at Viterbo. He is succeeded by Urban IV as the 182nd pope of the Catholic Church.
- August 29 – Urban IV offers the crown of Sicily to Charles of Anjou, youngest son of King Louis VIII of France, hoping to strengthen his position.
- Wurmsbach Abbey (located in Bollingen) is established by Count Rudolf V of Rapperswil in Switzerland.

=== 1262 ===
==== By place ====
====== Mongol Empire ======
- Berke–Hulagu war: Mongol forces under Berke Khan, ruler of the Golden Horde, raid territory in the Caucasus belonging to his cousin Hulagu Khan, ruler of the Ilkhanate. Berke supports the Georgian rebels and allies with the Mamluks. He defeats the Ilkhanate forces on the Terek River, together with the Mamluk army led by Baibars (or Abu al-Futuh), saving Palestine and Arabia from Ilkhanate occupation.

====== Europe ======
- March 8 – Battle of Hausbergen: The bourgeois of Strasbourg defeat a German army of knights (some 5,000 men) under Bishop Walter of Geroldseck. Strasbourg becomes an imperial Free City of the Holy Roman Empire.
- May – King Alfonso X ("the Wise") of Castile and León, at a meeting in Jaén, demands military support from Muhammad I, ruler of Granada, and relinquishes the ports of Tarifa and Algeciras to prepare an invasion of North Africa.
- September 14 – Reconquista: Castilian-Leonese forces led by Alfonso X conquer Cádiz. The city has been under Moorish rule since 711. The Muslims are ousted, and Alfonso repopulates the region (also called the Repoblación).
- The Icelandic Commonwealth enters into the Old Covenant (Gissurarsáttmáli), establishing a union with Norway, and acknowledges King Haakon IV of Norway ("the Old") as its ruler.
- King Mindaugas of Lithuania perhaps renounces Christianity, returning to the country's pagan roots, and reverting to Grand Duke.

====== Levant ======
- Al-Hakim I, a member of the Abbasid dynasty, travels to Egypt and is proclaimed as caliph of Cairo in succession to his former rival Al-Mustansir II. After his arrival, he is imprisoned at the Citadel of Cairo by orders of Sultan Baibars but released in 1296 by Sultan Lajin.

====== Asia ======
- King Mangrai of Lan Na (modern Northern Thailand) founds the city of Chiang Rai as the kingdom's capital.

==== By topic ====
====== Arts and Culture ======
- Adam de la Halle, French trouvère and musician, writes the first operetta, Le Jeu de la Feuillee.

====== Markets ======
- The Venice Senate starts consolidating all of the Republic's outstanding debt into a single fund, later known as the Monte Vecchio. The holders of the newly created prestiti are promised a 5% annual coupon. These claims can be sold, and quickly (before 1320) give rise to the first recorded secondary market for financial assets, in Medieval Europe.

====== Religion ======
- January 25 – Richard of Chichester in England (d. 1253) is canonized as a saint; he is best known for authoring the prayer adapted into the song "Day by Day" in the musical Godspell (1971).

====== Science and Technology ======
- Alfonso X of Castile ("the Wise") commissions Yehuda ben Moshe and Isaac ibn Sid to compile the Alfonsine Tables, describing the movement of the planets.

=== 1263 ===
==== By place ====
====== Byzantine Empire ======
- Before July – Battle of Settepozzi: A Byzantine-Genoese fleet (some 50 galleys) is routed by the Venetians near Spetses in the Argolic Gulf, who capture four ships and inflict considerable casualties. Later, the Genoese that survive the battle managed to capture Chania on Crete. They receive orders to avoid direct confrontations with the Venetian fleet, but instead are engaged in raiding against the Venetian merchant convoys in the Euripus Strait.
- Summer – Emperor Michael VIII Palaiologos sends a Byzantine expeditionary force (some 3,500 men) led by his half-brother, Constantine Palaiologos, to the Peloponnese in southern Greece. The army is transported to Monemvasia on Genoese ships, while a small Byzantine fleet is sent to harass the Latin island holdings in Euboea and the Cyclades. After arriving at Monemvasia, Constantine lays siege to Sparta, while the Byzantine fleet seizes the southern coast of Laconia.
- Battle of Prinitza: Constantine Palaiologos marches the Byzantine army up the rivers Eurotas and Alfeios towards the Achaean capital, Andravida. At a narrow pass at Prinitza (near Ancient Olympia) in Elis, the Byzantines are attacked by Achaean forces (some 300 horsemen) under John of Katavas, who inflict a resounding defeat upon them; many Byzantine soldiers are killed. Constantine himself barely escapes with his life, and flees with the remainder of his army to the safety of Mystras.

====== Europe ======
- July – Scottish–Norwegian War: King Haakon IV of Norway ("the Old") assembles a fleet (some 120 warships), and sets sail to defend the Hebrides, in an attempt to reassert Norwegian sovereignty over the Western Isles of Scotland. Haakon stops at the Isle of Arran, where in August negotiations are started with the 21-year-old King Alexander III of Scotland. The talks are prolonged by the Scots until the autumn storms begin.
- September 12 – Mindaugas (or Mendog), the only Christian king of Lithuania, is assassinated by his cousin Treniota. The country reverts to paganism and loses its status as a kingdom. Treniota usurps the throne (until 1264).
- October 2 – Battle of Largs: Scottish forces under Alexander Stewart rout a Viking invasion force led by Haakon IV at Largs in North Ayrshire. The battle is inconclusive. On the morning of October 3, the Norwegians return to collect their dead and burn their beached ships. By the end of October, the Viking fleet reaches Orkney, where Haakon becomes ill and dies at the Bishop's Palace, on December 16.
- December – Magnus VI ("the Law-mender") succeeds his father Haakon IV as King of Norway. The chieftains of the eastern part of Iceland become the last to pledge fealty to Magnus, bringing a more complete end to the Icelandic Commonwealth and the Age of the Sturlungs.
- Winter – Reconquista: King Alfonso X of Castile ("the Wise") conquers Niebla from the Moors, terminating any Muslim presence in the western region of Spain.
- Reconquista – King James I of Aragon ("the Conqueror") captures Crevillent from the Moors and it becomes a part of the Kingdom of Valencia.

====== England ======
- April – Simon de Montfort, 6th Earl of Leicester, newly returned from exile, takes control of southern England. In early May he summons a meeting of rebel barons at Oxford.
- July 16 – Rebels occupy London.
- Baronial forces led by Robert de Ferrers and Henry de Montfort lay siege to Worcester. The attackers finally enter the city and are allowed to sack it. They kill most of the Jewish community as part of the targeting of Jews during the conflict with the Barons by allies of de Montfort.
- October 2 – King Henry III of England travels to Boulogne for an attempt to broker peace with his barons by King Louis IX of France.

====== Levant ======
- April 4 – Egyptian forces led by Sultan Baibars (or Abu al-Futuh) attack Acre; there is severe fighting outside the walls, in which the seneschal, Geoffrey of Sergines, is badly wounded. Baibars is not yet ready to besiege the city and begins a major campaign to eliminate the Crusader kingdom of Jerusalem, the county of Tripoli and the principality of Antioch.

==== By topic ====
====== Arts and Culture ======
- The Savoy Palace is constructed in London by Peter II, Count of Savoy.

====== Education ======
- Presumed date – Balliol College is established in the University of Oxford (England) by John I de Balliol on its modern-day site.

====== Markets ======
- The Lord Edward, son and heir of Henry III of England, seizes £10,000 which had been deposited to the trust of the Knights Templar in London by foreign merchants and English magnates.
- The Bonsignori firm gains the full market of the transfer of fiscal revenue from the papal estates to Rome.

====== Religion ======
- July 20–24 – Nahmanides, Spanish chief rabbi, defends the Talmud in an important debate (the Disputation of Barcelona) against Pablo Christiani, before James I of Aragon.
- Probable date – The doctrines of Joachim of Fiore, French hermit and theologian, are condemned as heresy by the Catholic Church Synod of Arles.

=== 1264 ===
==== By place ====
====== Byzantine Empire ======
- Spring – Battle of Makryplagi: Constantine Palaiologos (half-brother of Michael VIII) resumes operations against the Principality of Achaea. He advances up in northern Elis, and sets up his camp at a location called "St. Nicholas of Mesiskli". Prince William of Villehardouin with his own troops marches to meet him and arrays his men ready for battle. The Byzantine vanguard under Michael Kantakouzenos, ride forth from the Byzantine lines, but the force is ambushed and Michael is killed by the Achaeans. Constantine retreats and goes on to lay siege to the fortress of Nikli. There, Turkish mercenaries (some 1,000 horsemen), confront him and demand that he pay them their arrears of 6 months. Constantine refuses, whereupon the Turkish troops desert to William. He decides to raise the siege and departs for Constantinople. He leaves Alexios Philes with a force and marches towards Messenia, where he occupies the passes, situated near Gardiki Castle. William, reinforced by the Turkish contingent, marches to Messenia to attack the Byzantines, despite their holding strong positions on the high ground. The first two attacks are beaten off, but during the third attack, the Byzantines flee in panic. Alexios, along with many Greek nobles, is captured.

====== Europe ======
- August 8 – Mudéjar Revolt: Muslim rebel forces, aided by allies from Algeciras and Tarifa, take the town of Jerez de la Frontera after defeating the outnumbered Castilian garrison led by Nuño González de Lara ("the Good"). The rebels are supported by Muhammad I, ruler of the Emirate of Granada, while King Alfonso X of Castile ("the Wise") is allied with Aragon. The rebels manage to capture Murcia, as well as several smaller towns.
- August 14 – Battle of Saseno: The Genoese fleet (16 galleys) manages to trick and capture an entire Venetian trade convoy near Saseno Island off the coast of Albania. The captured merchandise and ships are valued at more than 100,000 Genoese pounds, an enormous sum for the period, of which 30,000 goes into the Genoese treasury through the sale of the plunder.
- October 9 – Reconquista: Castilian forces under Alfonso X counter-attack and recapture Jerez de la Frontera after a siege. The rebel-held towns of Vejer de la Frontera, Rota, and Sanlúcar de Barrameda also fall to Alfonso. Muslims in the retaken towns are expelled and the mosques in Jerez are converted to churches. The region is settled by Christians from elsewhere.
- December 10 – Hungarian Civil War, a dynastic conflict, erupts between King Béla IV and his son, Duke Stephen. Hungarian forces under Ladislaus II Kán invades Stephen's realm and push forward unhindered penetrating the valley of the Mureș River in the southern part of Transylvania. Stephen's army halts Ladislaus' advance at the Fortress of Deva (modern Romania).
- Winter – The War of the Thuringian Succession ends after 17 years with the state of Hesse gaining its independence from Thuringia and becoming the Landgraviate of Hesse, a principality of the Holy Roman Empire.
- Approximate date – High Duke Bolesław V the Chaste promulgates legal protection for Jewish communities in Lesser Poland, including protection from kidnapping and forcible baptism of Jewish children.

====== British Isles ======
- January 23 – King Louis IX of France ("the Saint") issues the Mise of Amiens, a settlement between King Henry III of England and his rebellious barons under Simon de Montfort, heavily favouring the former – which leads to the Second Barons' War. At Amiens, Henry accuses the barons of destroying his castles and laying waste to royal lands. For this he demands a compensation of some £300,000 and 200,000 marks, which is defended by Louis.
- April 5 – Battle of Northampton: English forces under Roger Mortimer, advance over the water meadows south of Northampton to attack its main gate with engines. Meanwhile, another party rides clockwise along the built-up area's western perimeter, looking for an easier entrance. While the townsmen entrust to hold up the initial attack, the outflanking detachment founds a breach in the garden wall of St. Andrew's Priory, at the north of the town. Simon de Montfort the Younger (son of Simon de Montfort) reacts to the break-in – riding upon his horse with his squire, and some followers to contest the breach. But Simon is captured and throws the defenders into disarray. Simon de Montfort mounts a rearguard to relieve his son, but on April 6 the castle falls.
- April 17–19 – English rebels under Simon de Montfort beset Rochester from two directions in a pincer movement from north and south. The garrison sortie burns the suburbs to deprive the rebels of cover. Initial assaults on the bridge the next morning are repulsed by Roger de Leybourne. In the evening, however, supported by archers shooting across the river, Simon launches an amphibious assault, wind and current carrying his fireship across to set fire to the bridge defenses. The rebels capture the castle's outer bailey and the garrison retires inside the keep on April 19. Meanwhile, rebels under Gilbert de Clare ("the Red Earl") occupy the cathedral. The siege then boggs down, Simon receives reports of a relief force and orders to withdraw on April 26.
- April – Gilbert de Clare leads a massacre of the Jews at Canterbury, during the outbreak of the Second Barons' War. In the meantime, another of de Montfort's followers, John FitzJohn, leads a massacre against the Jews in London. The Jewish communities of Northampton, Winchester, Cambridge, and Lincoln are looted. The archæ (official chest of records) is destroyed or deposited at the headquarters of de Montfort's supporters at Ely.
- May 14 – Battle of Lewes: English rebels led by Simon de Montfort defeat Henry III and Prince Edward ("the Lord Edward"), at Lewes. Henry leaves the safety of Lewes Castle and St. Pancras Priory, to engage the rebels. Edward routes part of the rebel army (some 5,000 men) with a cavalry charge, but during the battle de Montfort's forces capture both Henry and Edward, making Simon the "uncrowned king of England" for 15 months.
- May – Simon de Montfort marches on London but the drawbridge on London Bridge has been raised by the Lord Mayor. Simon has the support of the Londoners, who manage to lower the bridge allowing him into the city. Henry III is forced to pardon the rebel nobles and reinstates the Provisions of Oxford. With Henry's power diminished, Simon announces that all debts owed to the Jews would be canceled.
- June – Simon de Montfort summons Parliament in London to confirm new constitutional arrangements. Two knights are summoned for each county, and are allowed to comment on general matters of state – the first time this has occurred. In France, Queen Eleanor of Provence, wife of Henry III, makes plans for an invasion of England with the support of Louis IX OF France.
- June – The Lord Edward is held captive at Wallingford Castle, but after an escape attempt he is moved to Kenilworth Castle.
- June 18 – The Parliament of Ireland meets at Castledermot in County Kildare, the first definitely known meeting of this Irish legislature.
- December 24 – The title Baron de Ros, the oldest held peerage title, is created by writ of summons during the reign of Henry III.

====== Mongol Empire ======
- The Toluid Civil War ends: Kublai Khan defeats his brother and pretender to the title of "Great Khan", Ariq Böke, who surrenders to Kublai on August 24. He is imprisoned and with the Chinese support behind him, Kublai is acknowledged by the rulers of the western khanates and as sole ruler of the Mongol Empire. He moves his capital from Shangdu in Inner Mongolia, to the Chinese city of Dadu (modern-day Beijing).

====== Asia ======
- February – The Japanese era Kōchō ends and the Bun'ei era begins during the reign of the 14-year-old Emperor Kameyama (until 1275).

==== By topic ====
====== Education ======
- September 14 – Walter de Merton formally completes the foundation of the House of Scholars of Merton (later Merton College, Oxford), to provide education in Malden and the University of Oxford.

====== Religion ======
- August 11 – By the papal bull Transiturus, Pope Urban IV declares the Feast of Corpus Christi (festum corporis) to be celebrated by the entire Catholic Church.
- October 2 – Urban IV dies after a pontificate of 3-years and is succeeded by Clement IV. His papal election occurs at Perugia, which will last for four months.
- Approximate date – Thomas Aquinas completes his theological work Summa contra Gentiles.

=== 1265 ===
==== By place ====
====== Europe ======
- January 20 – In Westminster, the first elected English parliament (called Montfort's Parliament) conducts its first meeting in the Palace of Westminster, later to be known as the Houses of Parliament.
- March – End of the Hungarian Civil War (1264–1265) – Battle of Isaszeg: Younger King Stephen decisively defeats his father's army.
- May 28 – Future King Edward I of England escapes the captivity of Simon de Montfort, 6th Earl of Leicester.
- June 18 – A draft Byzantine–Venetian treaty is concluded between Venetian envoys and Emperor Michael VIII Palaiologos, but is not ratified by Doge Reniero Zeno
- August 4 – Second Barons' War in England: The Battle of Evesham is fought in Worcestershire, with the army of Edward defeating the forces of rebellious barons led by Simon de Montfort, resulting in the death of Montfort and many of his allies. This is sometimes considered the death of chivalry in England.
- The Isle of Man comes under Scottish rule.

====== North Africa and Asia ======
- The Mamluk Sultanate Bahri dynasty of Egypt captures several cities and towns from Crusader states in the Middle East, including the cities of Haifa, Arsuf, and Caesarea Maritima; these events eventually precipitate the Eighth Crusade in 1267.
- Kublai Khan sends a delegation to Japan, which loots islands along the way.
- Fire destroys parts of Old Cairo.
- India, Delhi: Ghiyas-Ud-Din-Balban comes to the throne and introduces Sijdah.
- Mongol armies, led by Nogai Khan, raid Thrace.
- In the first major battle in five years (since the Song dynasty Chinese pushed the forces of Kublai Khan back across the Yangzi River, after Möngke Khan's failed invasion in 1259), Kublai Khan engages the Chinese in Sichuan province. Kublai gains a preliminary victory, and war booty of 146 captured Song dynasty naval ships.

==== By topic ====
====== Culture ======
- The Book of Aneirin, a Welsh manuscript of poetry, is penned.
- The brewing of Budweiser Budvar beer begins in Bohemia; Budweiser Budvar has been produced continuously there to this day.
- Correspondence from Pope Clement IV contains the first known mention of the ring of the Fisherman, an item of papal regalia then used to seal personal correspondence from the pope, and later for papal bulls.
- February 5 – Pope Clement IV succeeds Pope Urban IV, as the 183rd pope.

=== 1266 ===
==== By place ====
====== Europe ======
- January 2 – Siege of Murcia: King James I of Aragon ("the Conqueror") marches with his army from Orihuela and lays siege at Murcia on the Segura River. Skirmishes break out between the defenders and the Aragonese forces. The Muslim garrison, realizing that they are outnumbered and cut off from reinforcements, asks for terms. James offers to ask King Alfonso X of Castile ("the Wise") to restore the Murcians' legal rights (see 1244) from before the rebellion: self-government under Castilian suzerainty, freedom of worship, and preservation of lands and properties. They agree to this offer but request Alfonso's explicit agreement rather than just James' promise to ask him. James refuses to get Alfonso's agreement before the city surrenders. Finally, the Moors yield Murcia to James on January 31. Seeing his standard on the walls, James enters the city on February 3, accepting its surrender.
- February 26 – Battle of Benevento: Guelph forces (some 12,000 men), led by Charles of Anjou, brother of King Louis IX of France, defeat a combined German and Sicilian army under King Manfred of Sicily, during a long-running power struggle in Italy. Manfred takes up a strong position near Benevento. As the French infantry advances, he unleashes his Saracen archers and light cavalry, which scatters the French. But the Saracens leave themselves exposed to the French heavy cavalry, and are overwhelmed. Manfred orders his heavy cavalry (some 1,200 German mercenary knights) into the attack, but they are defeated by the Guelph forces, and take heavy losses. Manfred is killed, and Pope Clement IV invests Charles as ruler of Sicily and Naples. Meanwhile, Michael II, despot of Epirus, invades Albania, and recovers the lands that Manfred has taken from him.
- June – The Mudéjar revolt of 1264–1266 ends. The rebels make their formal submission to Alfonso X. They recognize the error that the Moors of Murcia have committed against their overlord Alfonso. Representatives of the aljama, or municipal council, renew their allegiance and humbly beg for pardon, mercy and favour. With this, the Mudéjar uprising in the Kingdom of Murcia is formally ended.
- June 23 – Battle of Trapani: The Venetian fleet (24 galleys) led by Admiral Jacopo Dondulo moves to Marsala and attacks the larger Genoese fleet anchored at Trapani, capturing all its ships. Some 1,200 Genoese drown and many are killed. Dondulo is acclaimed a hero on his return to Venice in July and elected as Captain General of the Sea, Venice's highest naval command position.
- July 2 – Treaty of Perth: King Alexander III of Scotland agrees to a peace settlement with King Magnus VI of Norway ("the Law-mender") in which the Outer Hebrides and Isle of Man are ceded to Scotland in exchange for 4,000 marks. In return, Alexander confirms Norwegian sovereignty over the islands of Shetland and Orkney.

====== England ======
- May 15 – Second Barons' War: Battle of Chesterfield: English forces led by Henry of Almain, son of Richard of Cornwall, defeat rebels under Robert de Ferrers in a minor skirmish at Chesterfield. Robert is taken as a prisoner to London, and at the Parliament of England disinherits. In July, he is forced to surrender land and Liverpool Castle to Edmund Crouchback, second son of King Henry III of England.
- October 31 – Dictum of Kenilworth provides terms of peace in the Second Barons' War between supporters of the slain rebel leader Simon de Montfort and Henry III.
- December 13 – Siege of Kenilworth: English forces under Henry III capture Kenilworth Castle from remaining rebels in the Second Barons' War after a 6-month siege. During the siege Archbishop William Freney tries to negotiate with the garrison but is refused entry.

====== Levant ======
- July 23 – Siege of Safed: Mamluk forces capture the castle of Safed, defended by a garrison of 1,700 men (including some 500 Knights Templar), after a 6-week siege. Sultan Baibars promises safe conduct but when the Christians and Templars are on their way towards Acre, they are seized and beheaded.
- August 24 – Battle of Mari: Mamluk forces (some 30,000 men) led by Baibars defeat the Armenian army in Cilicia, in retaliation for the support of the Mongol invasion in Syria. He expands his domain, capturing the city of Byblos (modern Lebanon) and the important castle of Toron from the Crusader States.
- October 28 – A Crusader advance guard is ambushed by the Egyptian garrison of Safed, while local Arabs attack the Crusader camp. The 13-year-old Hugh II, ruler of Cyprus, is advised to retire and withdraw with heavy losses. Meanwhile, Baibars campaigns in Galilee and leads a lightning raid to Tripoli.

====== Asia ======
- Niccolo and Maffeo Polo, father and uncle of Marco Polo, reach the Mongol capital Khanbaliq (modern-day Beijing), setting the stage for Marco's famous expedition 5 years later. Kublai Khan sends the Polos back with a message, requesting that Pope Clement IV dispatch western scholars to teach in the Mongol Empire; however, this request is largely ignored.

====== America ======
- In the modern-day United States, a period of drought (up until 1299) begins in the Four Corners Region, putting an end to the ancient Puebloans Civilization.

==== By topic ====
====== Economics ======
- In France, the gold écu (or crown) and silver grosh coins are minted for the first time during the reign of Louis IX.

====== Religion ======
- Ode de Pougy, French Abbess of Notre Dame aux Nonnains, sends a gang to attempt to destroy the nearby part-completed Église Saint-Urbain, Troyes.

=== 1267 ===
==== By place ====
====== Asia and North Africa ======
- The "Grand Capital" is constructed in Khanbaliq (modern-day Beijing) by Kublai Khan, having moved the capital of the Mongol Empire there three years prior.
- Malik ul Salih establishes Samudra Pasai, the first Muslim state in Indonesia.
- Spain attempts an invasion of Morocco, but the Muslim empire Marinid Sultanate successfully defend against the invasion, and drive out Spanish forces.

=== 1268 ===
==== By topic ====
====== War and politics ======
- February 18 – Battle of Rakvere: The Livonian Order is defeated by Dovmont of Pskov.
- April 4 – A five-year Byzantine–Venetian peace treaty is concluded between Venetian envoys and Emperor Michael VIII Palaiologos. It is ratified by the Doge of Venice Reniero Zeno on June 30.
- August 23 – Battle of Tagliacozzo: The army of Charles of Anjou defeats the Ghibellines supporters of Conradin of Hohenstaufen, marking the fall of the Hohenstaufen Family from the Imperial and Sicilian thrones, and leading to the new chapter of Angevin domination in Southern Italy.
- October 29 – Conradin, the last legitimate male heir of the Hohenstaufen Dynasty of Kings of Germany and Holy Roman Emperors, is executed, along with his companion Frederick I, Margrave of Baden, by Charles I of Sicily, a political rival and ally to the hostile Roman Catholic Church.
- King Stephen V of Hungary launches a war against Bulgaria.
- The County of Wernigerode becomes a vassal state of the Margrave of Brandenburg.
- New election procedures for the election of the doge are established in Venice, in order to reduce the influence of powerful individual families and possibly to prevent the popular Lorenzo Tiepolo from becoming elected.
- Pope Clement IV dies; the following papal election fails to choose a new pope for almost three years, precipitating the later creation of stringent rules governing the electoral procedures.

====== Culture ======
- Nicola Pisano completes the famous octagonal Gothic-style pulpit, at the Duomo di Siena.
- The carnival in Venice is first recorded.
- In France, the use of hops as the exclusive flavoring agent used in the manufacture of beer is made compulsory.
- The town of Guta is founded (currently Kolárovo, Slovakia).

==== By place ====
====== Asia ======
- May 18 – Battle of Antioch: The Principality of Antioch, a crusader state, falls to the Mamluk Sultan Baibars; his destruction of the city of Antioch is so great, as to permanently negate the city's importance.
- The Battle of Xiangyang, a 6-year battle between the Chinese Song dynasty and the Mongol forces of Kublai Khan, begins in what is today Hubei.
- Kublai Khan sends an emissary to the Kamakura shogunate of Japan, demanding an acknowledgment of suzerainty and payment of tribute; the Japanese refuse, starting a diplomatic back-and-forth, lasting until the Mongols attempt to invade in 1274.
- An earthquake in Cilicia occurs in 1268 northeast of the city of Adana. Over 60,000 people perished in the Armenian Kingdom of Cilicia in southern Asia Minor.
- The Tibetan monk Drogön Chögyal Phagpa of the Sakya School completes the 'Phags-pa script, which was sponsored by Kublai Khan as a new writing system in his empire.

=== 1269 ===
==== By place ====
====== Europe ======
- June 16 – Battle of Colle Val d'Elsa: Guelph forces (2,200 men) led by King Charles I of Anjou defeat the Ghibellines at Tuscany. After the battle, the Guelphs drive out their adversaries at Colle di Val d'Elsa, destroying their houses, and confiscating their possessions.
- June 19 – King Louis IX of France ("the Saint") orders all Jews found in public without an identifying yellow badge to be fined ten livres of silver. He also confiscates goods from the Jewish population to fund the Eighth Crusade.
- September – An Aragonese contingent under King James I ("the Conqueror") sails from Barcelona to the Holy Land but is caught in a storm and badly damaged. One squadron reaches Acre, but later returns to Aragon.
- King Ottokar II of Bohemia inherits Carinthia and part of Carniola, making him the most powerful German prince within the Holy Roman Empire; the empire lacking an emperor during the ongoing “Great Interregnum”.

====== Britain ======
- Prince Edward (the Lord Edward) of England obtains the right to levy a twentieth of the value of the Church's wealth to finance the Ninth Crusade. That sum turns out to be insufficient, and Edward has to borrow to reach his target.
- John I Comyn, Lord of Badenoch, begins the construction of Blair Castle in Scotland.

====== Africa ======
- September 8 – Berber forces of the Marinid Sultanate under Abu Yusuf Yaqub ibn Abd al-Haqq complete the conquest of Morocco and capture Marrakesh after a long siege, effectively ending the Almohad Caliphate. The last Almohad ruler, Idris al-Wathiq (or Abu Dabbus), is assassinated by a slave. The Marinids become the new masters of the western Maghreb and Abu Yusuf Yaqub takes up the title of "Prince of the Muslims".

==== By topic ====
====== Religion ======
- March – Ode de Pougy, French Abbess of Notre Dame aux Nonnains, and several associates who assist her, are excommunicated.
- Approximate date – Opizzo Fieschi, Latin patriarch of Antioch, is exiled, being displaced because of the East–West Schism of 1054.

====== Science ======
- Petrus Peregrinus de Maricourt, French mathematician and writer, performs a series of experiments with magnetic poles and proposes that a machine can be run forever in perpetual motion using the properties of magnets.

== Significant people ==
- Berke Khan
- Kublai Khan
- Hulagu Khan
- Baibars
- Louis IX of France
- Qutuz

== Births ==
1260

- May 15 or July 25 – John of Castile, Lord of Valencia de Campos (d. 1319)
- August 2 – Kyawswa of Pagan, last ruler of the Pagan Kingdom (d. 1299)
- approximate date
  - Enguerrand de Marigny, minister to King Philip IV of France
  - Fatima bint al-Ahmar, Nasrid princess in the Emirate of Granada (d. 1349)
  - Henry de Cobham, 1st Baron Cobham (d. 1339)
  - Matthew III Csák, Hungarian oligarch
  - Meister Eckhart, German theologian, philosopher and mystic (d. 1328)
  - Guillaume de Nogaret, keeper of the seal to King Philip IV of France (d. 1313)
  - Maximus Planudes, Byzantine grammarian and theologian (approximate date; d. 1330)
  - Khutulun, Mongol princess and warrior (d. 1306)

1261

- February 1 – Walter de Stapledon, English bishop of Exeter (d. 1326)
- February 11 – Otto III, Duke of Bavaria, king of Hungary and Croatia (d. 1312)
- February 28 – Margaret of Scotland, queen consort of Norway (d. 1283)
- March 1 – Hugh Despenser the Elder, English chief adviser (d. 1326)
- July 25 – Arthur II, Breton nobleman (House of Dreux) (d. 1312)
- October 9 – Denis I ("the Poet King"), king of Portugal (d. 1325)
- Abu Abdallah ibn al-Hakim, Andalusian vizier and poet (d. 1309)
- November – 'Ala' al-Dawla Simnani, Persian Sufi mystic and writer (d. 1336)
- Albertino Mussato, Paduan statesman, poet and chronicler (d. 1329)
- Constantine Palaiologos, Byzantine prince and general, son of Michael VIII (d. 1306)
- Daniel of Moscow (Aleksandrovich), Russian prince (d. 1303)
- Zangpo Pal, Tibetan religious leader (d. 1323)
- Elizabeth of Sicily, queen consort of Hungary (House of Anjou) (d. 1303)
- Konoe Iemoto, Japanese nobleman (kugyō) and regent (d. 1296)
- Pier Saccone Tarlati di Pietramala, Italian nobleman and condottiero (d. 1356)
- Władysław I Łokietek ("Elbow-High"), king of Poland (d. 1333)

1262

- May 6 – John Hastings, English nobleman and knight (d. 1313)
- August 5 – Ladisslaus IV ("the Cuman"), king of Hungary (d. 1290)
- October 18 – Ranulph Neville (or Ralph), English nobleman (d. 1331)
- Bérenger de Landore, French preacher and archbishop (d. 1330)
- Elisabeth of Carinthia (or Tyrol), queen consort of Germany (d. 1312)
- Guan Daogao, Chinese calligrapher, poet and painter (d. 1319)
- Guan Daosheng, Chinese painter, poet and writer (d. 1319)
- John II (Megas Komnenos), emperor of Trebizond (d. 1297)
- John of Castile, Lord of Valencia de Campos, Spanish prince (infante) and regent (d. 1319)
- Takatsukasa Kanetada, Japanese nobleman (kugyō) (d. 1301)
- U T'ak (or Woo Tak), Korean scholar and philosopher (d. 1342)
- William de Cantilupe, Anglo-Norman nobleman and knight (d. 1308)

1263

- January 22 – Ibn Taymiyyah, Syrian philosopher (d. 1328)
- February 8 – Afonso of Portugal, Lord of Portalegre, Portuguese prince (d. 1312)
- March 20 – Yolande of Dreux, queen consort of Scotland (d. 1330)
- Henry III, German nobleman (House of Gorizia) (d. 1323)
- Ingeborg of Sweden, countess of Holstein-Plön (d. 1292)
- Juliana FitzGerald, Lady of Thomond, Norman-Irish noblewoman (d. 1300)
- Napoleone Orsini, Italian cardinal and diplomat (d. 1342)
- Philip of Chieti, Flemish nobleman and knight (d. 1308)
- Roseline of Villeneuve, French Carthusian nun and saint (d. 1329)
- Theobald II, Duke of Lorraine (or Thiebaut), German nobleman (d. 1312)
- Tolberto III da Camino, Italian nobleman and condottiero (d. 1317)
- Zhongfeng Mingben, Chinese Buddhist master (d. 1323)

1264

- January 21 – Alexander, Scottish heir apparent (d. 1284)
- February 2 – Sancha of Portugal, Portuguese princess (d. 1279)
- May 26 – Koreyasu, Japanese prince and shogun (d. 1326)
- June 29 – Darmabala ("Protector of the Law"), Mongol prince (d. 1292)
- Ahmed al-Ghubrini, Hafsid scholar and chronicler (d. 1314)
- Louis of France, French prince and heir apparent (d. 1276)
- Nichiin, Japanese Buddhist monk and disciple (d. 1329)
- Wang Qinghui, Chinese concubine and poet (d. 1288)

1265

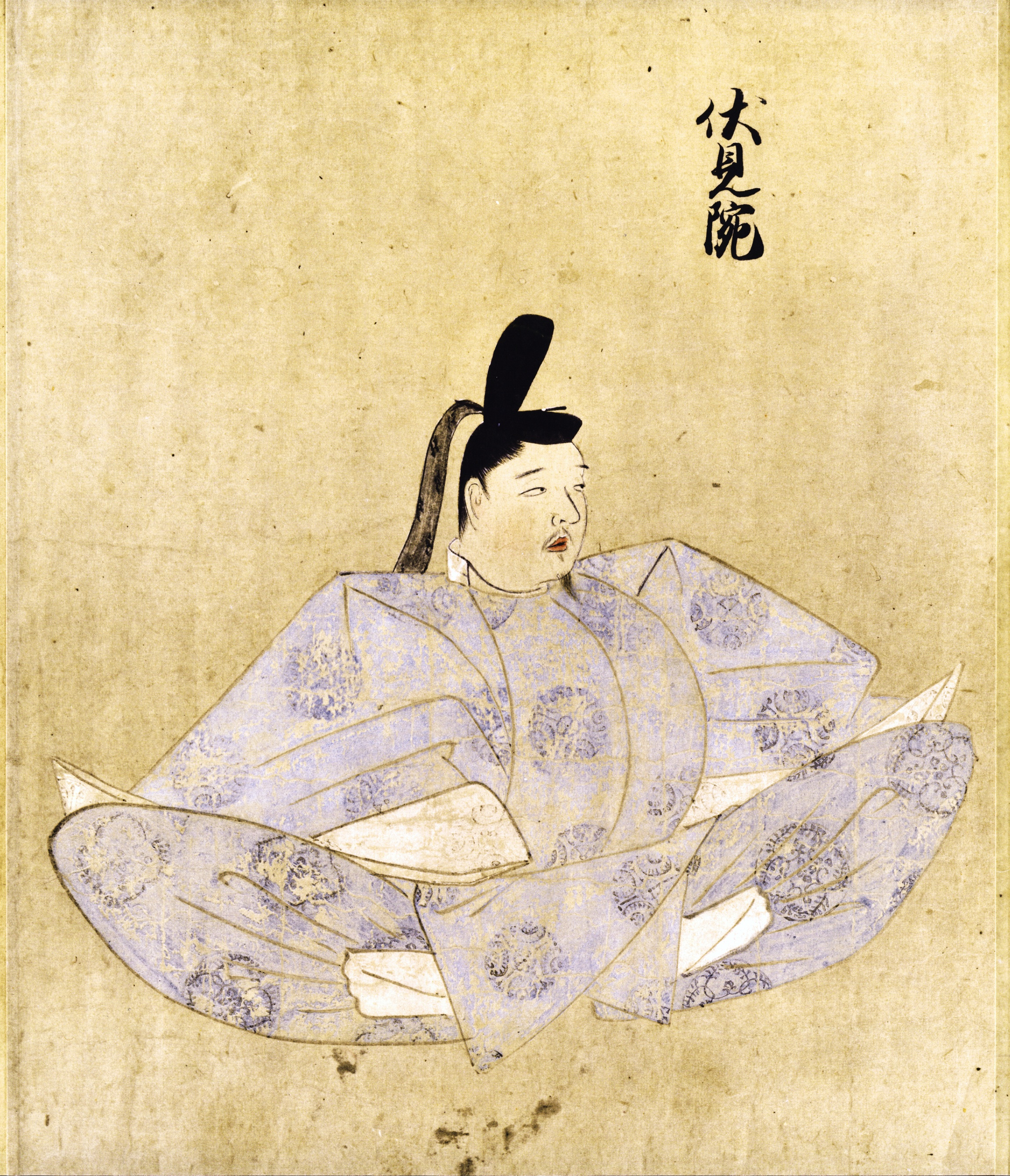
Emperor Fushimi

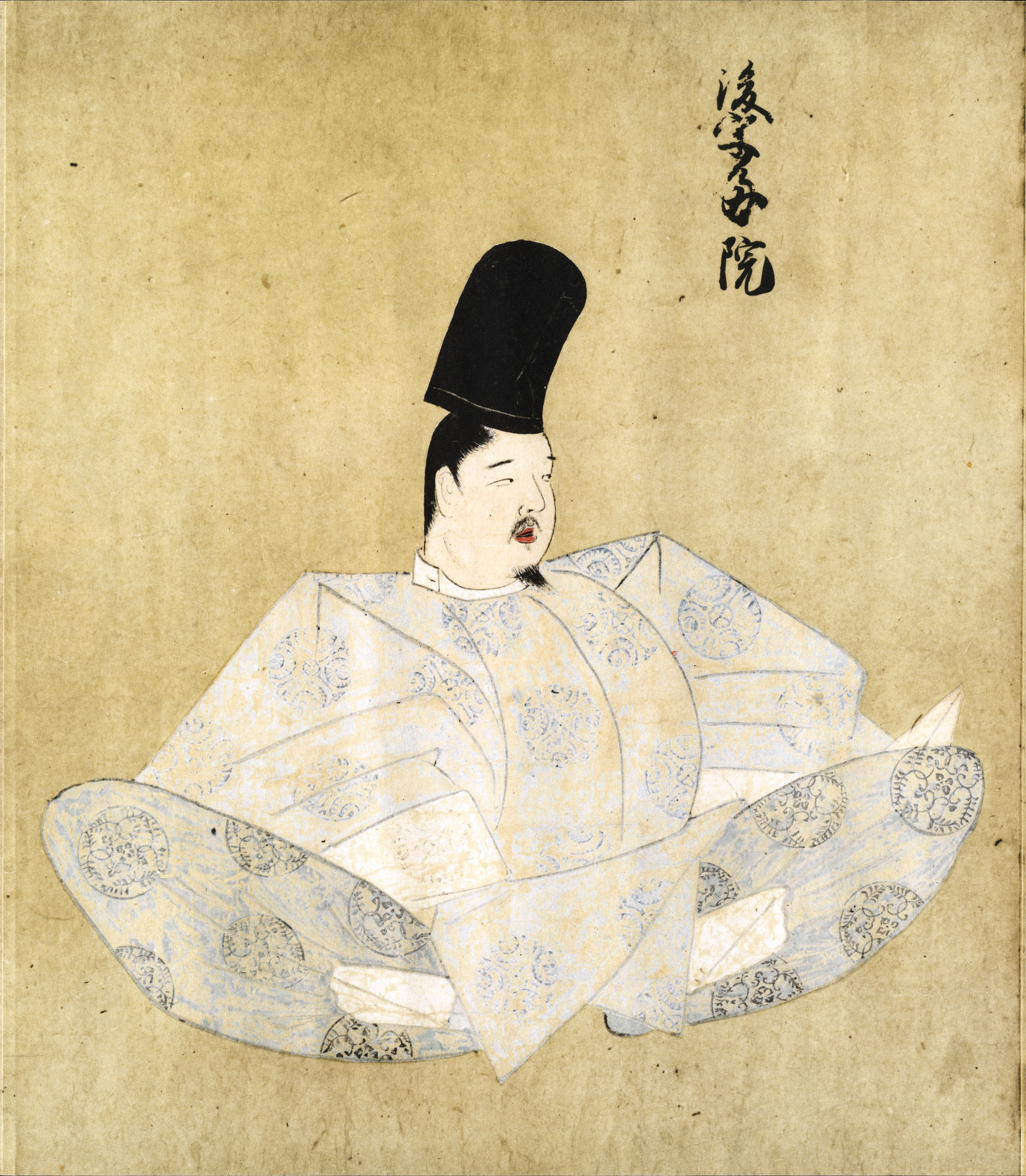
Emperor Go-Uda

- May 10 – Emperor Fushimi of Japan (d. 1317)
- December 17 – Emperor Go-Uda of Japan (d. 1324)
- King Alfonso III of Aragon
- approximate date – Dante Alighieri, Italian poet (d. 1321)
- approximate date – Maria de Molina, regent of Castile (d. 1321)
- approximate date – Beatrice Portinari, Dante Alighieri's beloved and guide through Heaven in The Divine Comedy (d. 1290)

1266

- Duns Scotus, Scottish priest and philosopher (d. 1308)
- Ki Cha-o, Korean nobleman (d. 1328)
- Gilbert Segrave, English nobleman and bishop (d. 1316)
- Herman VII, Margrave of Baden-Baden ("the Rouser"), German nobleman (d. 1291)
- Hethum II, king of Cilician Armenia (assassinated 1307)
- Jadwiga of Kalisz, queen consort of Poland (d. 1339)
- John of Brittany, English courtier, nobleman and knight (d. 1334)
- Margaret of Villehardouin, princess of Achaea (d. 1315)
- Alauddin Khalji, Sultan of Delhi (d. 1316)
- Ravivarman Kulaśēkhara, Indian ruler of Venad (d. 1317)
- Rigdzin Kumaradza, Tibetan Dzogchen master (d. 1343)

1267

- February 3 (or February 3, 1266) – Richard FitzAlan, 8th Earl of Arundel (d. 1302)
- August 10 – King James II of Aragon (d. 1327)
- Giotto di Bondone, Italian artist who marked the shift from medieval art to Proto-Renaissance art. (d. 1337)
- Roger de Flor, Sicilian military adventurer, leader of the mercenary group Catalan Company

1268

- April/June – Philip IV of France (d. 1314)
- Saint Clare of Montefalco (d. 1308)
- Emperor Duanzong of China (d. 1278)
- Mahaut, Countess of Artois (d. 1329)
- Vedanta Desika, Indian Hindu poet and philosopher

1269

- February 9 – Louis III, Duke of Bavaria, German nobleman, knight and regent (d. 1296)
- June 18 – Eleanor of England, English princess (d. 1298)
- July 10 – Emperor Duanzong (or Zhao Shi) of China (d. 1278)
- November – Philip of Artois, French nobleman and knight (d. 1298)
- Alexander of San Elpidio, Italian friar and bishop (d. 1326)
- Frederick Tuta, German nobleman and regent (d. 1291)
- Huang Gongwang (or Lu Jian), Chinese painter (d. 1354)
- Nichizō, Japanese Buddhist monk and disciple (d. 1342)

== Deaths ==
1260

- April 28 – Luchesius Modestini, founding member of the Third Order of St. Francis
- May – Marie of Brabant, Holy Roman Empress, wife of Otto IV, Holy Roman Emperor (alternative date is June)
- August 9 – Walter of Kirkham, Bishop of Durham
- October 24 – Saif ad-Din Qutuz, Mamluk sultan of Egypt
- December 4 – Aymer de Valence, Bishop of Winchester (b. 1222)
- date unknown
  - Kitbuqa, Mongol military leader (executed)
  - Sicko Sjaerdema, ruler of Friesland
  - Ibn al-Abbar, Andalusian diplomat and scholar (b. 1199)
- probable – Franciscus Accursius, Italian jurist

1261

- February 28 – Henry III ("the Good"), duke of Brabant (b. 1230)
- April 1 – Ahi Evran, Bektashi Sufi preacher and poet (b. 1169)
- May 25 – Alexander IV, pope of the Catholic Church (b. 1199)
- July 8 – Adolf IV of Holstein, German nobleman (House of Schaumburg)
- July 25 – Nicephorus II of Constantinople, Byzantine patriarch
- August – John FitzThomas, 1st Baron Desmond, Norman Irish nobleman, killed in battle
- August 24 – Ela of Salisbury, English noblewoman (b. 1187)
- September 18 – Konrad von Hochstaden, German archbishop
- September 22/27 – Plaisance of Antioch, queen consort of Cyprus (b. 1235)
- October 27 – Sancho of Castile, Spanish archbishop (b. 1233)
- November 2 – Bettisia Gozzadini, Bolognese noblewoman and academic lawyer (b. 1209)
- November 9 – Sanchia of Provence, Queen of the Romans, German queen consort (b. 1225)
- November 26 – Hōjō Shigetoki, Japanese samurai (b. 1198)
- November 27 – Athanasius III of Alexandria, Egyptian pope
- November 28 – Al-Mustansir II, Abbasid ruler (caliph) of Cairo, killed
- Abu Bakr Ibn Sayyid al-Nās, Andalusian theologian (b. 1200)
- An-Nasir Dawud, Kurdish ruler, Ayyubid ruler (emir) of Damascus (b. 1206)
- Benedict II of Esztergom, Hungarian chancellor, governor and archbishop
- Conrad I, Burgrave of Nuremberg ("the Pious"), German nobleman and knight (b. 1186)
- Qin Jiushao, Chinese mathematician and writer (b. 1202)
- Sayf al-Din Bakharzi, Persian poet and sheikh (b. 1190)
- Stephen of Bourbon, French Dominican preacher (b. 1180)

1262

- April 23 – Giles of Assisi, companion of Francis of Assisi (b. 1190)
- May 18 – John Climping, English cleric, chancellor and bishop
- June 23 – Siemowit I of Masovia, Polish nobleman and knight (House of Piast)
- July 13 – Henry Wingham, English Lord Chancellor and bishop
- July 14 – Richard de Clare, 6th Earl of Gloucester, English nobleman and knight (b. 1222)
- August 24 – Robert de Mariscis, English priest and archdeacon
- September 1 – Giuliana of Collalto, Italian Benedictine abbess and Blessed
- September 12 – Baldwin de Redvers, 7th Earl of Devon, English nobleman (b. 1236)
- October 5 – Teruko, Japanese princess and empress (b. 1224)
- December 13 – Giles of Bridport, English archdeacon and bishop
- December 21 – Bahauddin Zakariya, Ghurid scholar and poet
- Ibn al-Adim, Syrian diplomat, biographer and historian (b. 1192)
- Izz al-Din ibn 'Abd al-Salam, Syrian jurist and theologian (b. 1181)
- Matilda II, Countess of Nevers (or Maud of Dampierre), French noblewoman and regent (b. c. 1235)
- Mem Soares de Melo, 1st Lord de Melo, Portuguese nobleman and knight (b. 1200)
- Peter de Rivaux, Poitevin-born English High Sheriff and Lord High Treasurer

1263

- January 7 – Agnes of Merania, duchess of Carinthia (b. 1215)
- January 16 – Shinran, founder of Jōdo Shinshū (Shin Buddhism) (b. 1173)
- March 19 – Hugh of Saint-Cher, French friar and bishop (b. 1200)
- April 20 – John I, Count of Holstein-Kiel, German nobleman (House of Schauenburg)
- June 7 – Boniface, Savoyan nobleman (House of Savoy) (b. 1245)
- September 12 – Mindaugas (or Mendog), king of Lithuania, assassinated (b. 1203)
- November 14 – Alexander Nevsky, Grand Prince of Novgorod
- November 20(?) – Martino della Torre, Italian nobleman and condottiero
- December 16 – Haakon IV of Norway ("the Old"), king of Norway (b. 1204)
- December 24 – Hōjō Tokiyori, Japanese nobleman (b. 1227)
- Al-Ashraf Musa, Ayyubid prince (emir) and ruler of Homs (b. 1229)
- Caesarius of Alagno, Italian priest, bishop and counsellor
- Gilbert I de la Hay, Scottish nobleman, knight and regent
- Guy I de la Roche, duke of Athens and Thebes (b. 1205)
- John XIII bar Ma'dani, Syrian patriarch of Antioch
- Manuel I (Megas Komnenos), emperor of Trebizond
- Senana ferch Caradog, Welsh noblewoman (b. 1198)

1264

- February 16 – Azzo VII d'Este, marquis of Ferrara (b. 1205)
- April 25 – Roger de Quincy, Scotto-Norman nobleman (b. 1195)
- May 17 – Wartislaw III, Polish nobleman and knight (b. 1210)
- July 10 – Isabella de Clare, English noblewoman (b. 1226)
- August 1 – John I ("the Theologian"), German nobleman
- September 12 – Hōjō Nagatoki, Japanese regent (b. 1227)
- October 2 – Urban IV, pope of the Catholic Church (b. 1195)
- November 11 – Farinata degli Uberti, Italian nobleman (b. 1212)
- November 16 – Lizong (or Zhao Yun), Chinese emperor (b. 1205)
- Andrey II Yaroslavich, Grand Prince of Vladimir (b. 1222)
- Danylo Romanovych, ruler of Galicia–Volhynia (b. 1201)
- Domentijan, Serbian monk and philosopher (b. 1210)
- Fujiwara no Ieyoshi, Japanese waka poet (b. 1192)
- Hugh l'Aleman, Outremer knight and heir apparent
- Isabella of Cyprus, Cypriotic princess and regent
- John II of Beirut, Outremer nobleman and knight
- Nicholas I de Soules, Scottish nobleman and knight
- Perceval Doria, Genoese military leader and poet
- Robert de Vieuxpont, English nobleman and knight
- Approximate date
  - Dharmasvamin, Tibetan monk and explorer (b. 1197)
  - Vincent of Beauvais, French friar and encyclopedist

1265

- January 20 – John Maunsell, Lord Chancellor of England
- February 8 – Hulagu Khan of the Mongol Empire (b. 1217)
- May 16 – Simon Stock, English prior, canonized (b. c. 1165)
- June 26 – Anne of Bohemia, Duchess of Silesia (b. 1203 or 1204)
- August 4 (Killed in the Battle Of Evesham)
  - Hugh le Despencer, 1st Baron le Despencer (b. 1223)
  - Henry de Montfort (b. 1238)
  - Peter de Montfort
  - Simon de Montfort, 6th Earl of Leicester (b. 1208)
- November 24 – Magnús Óláfsson, King of Mann and the Isles
- December 3 – Odofredus, Italian jurist
- Al-Abharī, Persian philosopher and mathematician (b. 1200)

1266

- January 2 – Simon de Walton, English cleric and bishop
- January 11 – Swietopelk II, Duke of Pomerania ("the Great"), Polish nobleman
- February 12 – Walter de Cantilupe, English bishop (b. 1195)
- February 26
  - Manfred, King of Sicily, illegitimate son of Frederick II, Holy Roman Emperor (b. 1232)
  - Richard of Lauria, Italian nobleman and condottiere
- March – Margaret de Quincy, Countess of Lincoln, English noblewoman and heiress
- April 14 – Roger of Torre Maggiore, Italian archbishop
- May 7 – Fariduddin Ganjshakar, Ghurid preacher (b. 1179)
- May 27 – Elisabeth of Brunswick-Lüneburg, queen consort of the Romans, Countess of Holland and Countess of Zeeland (b. 1230)
- June 12 – Henry II, Prince of Anhalt-Aschersleben, German nobleman (b. 1215)
- July 24 – Albrecht II of Meissen, German canon and bishop
- August 4 – Odo, Count of Nevers (Odo or Eudes of Burgundy), French nobleman
- August 8 – Sayyed Ibn Tawus, Abbasid theologian (b. 1193)
- September 20 – Jan Prandota, bishop of Kraków (b. 1200)
- October 21 – Birger Jarl, Swedish nobleman and knight (b. 1210)
- October 28 – Arsenije Sremac, Serbian disciple and archbishop
- October 29 – Margaret of Austria, queen consort of Germany and later of Bohemia (b. 1204)
- November 19 – Nasiruddin Mahmud Shah, Mamluk ruler of Delhi
- December 3 – Henry III the White), duke of Silesia-Wrocław
- December – John of Ibelin ("John of Jaffa"), Outremer nobleman, crusader knight and legal writer (b. 1215)
- Aldonza Alfonso de León, illegitimate daughter of Alfonso IX
- Andronikos II (Megas Komnenos), emperor of Trebizond
- Ariq Böke (or Bukha), Mongol ruler (khagan) and regent
- Berke Khan, Mongol ruler of the Golden Horde (b. 1208)
- Chen Rong, Chinese painter, poet and politician (b. 1200)
- Hugh Bigod, English nobleman and chief justiciar (b. 1211)
- Hugh, Count of Burgundy (Hugh III of Châlon), French nobleman and knight (b. 1220)
- Luca Savelli, Italian senator and politician (b. 1190)
- Máel Coluim II, Mormaer of Fife (Malcolm II, Earl of Fife), Scottish nobleman
- Mu'ayyad al-Din al-Urdi, Syrian scholar and astronomer
- Philippe Chinard, French nobleman and admiral, murdered (b. 1205)
- Richer of Senones, French monk and chronicler (b. 1190)

1267

- February 21 – Baldwin of Ibelin, Seneschal of Cyprus
- March 3 or 4 – Lars, Archbishop of Uppsala
- March 17 – Peter of Montereau, French architect (b. c. 1200)
- September 23 – Beatrice of Provence, countess regnant of Provence (b. 1234)
- November 19 – Pedro Gallego, Franciscan scholar and translator
- November 26 – Sylvester Gozzolini, Italian founder of the Sylvestrines (b. 1177)
- November/December – Hugh II of Cyprus, king of Cyprus and regent of the Kingdom of Jerusalem. (b. 1253)
- date unknown – John FitzAlan, 6th Earl of Arundel, Breton-English nobleman and Marcher Lord (b. 1223)

1268

- May 15 – Peter II, Count of Savoy (b. 1203)
- July 7 – Reniero Zeno, Doge of Venice
- August 11 – Agnes of Faucigny, Dame ruler of Faucigny, countess consort of Savoy
- October 29
  - Conradin, Duke of Swabia (executed) (b. 1252)
  - Frederick I, Margrave of Baden (executed) (b. 1249)
- November 29 – Pope Clement IV
- December 9 – Vaišvilkas, Prince of Black Ruthenia
- date unknown
  - Barral of Baux, Grand Justiciar of Sicily
  - Henry de Bracton, English jurist

1269

- April – Geoffrey of Sergines, French nobleman and knight (b. 1205)
- July 7 – Saionji Saneuji, Japanese poet and writer (b. 1194)
- October 1 – Giordano Pironti, Italian aristocrat and cardinal
- October 27 – Ulrich III, Duke of Carinthia, German nobleman and knight (b. 1220)
- Abu al-Hasan al-Shushtari, Moorish poet and writer (b. 1212)
- Albin of Brechin (or Albinus), Scottish prelate and bishop
- Constance of Aragon, Lady of Villena, Spanish princess (infanta) (b. 1239)
- Ebulo de Montibus, Savoyan nobleman and knight (b. 1230)
- Gregorio di Montelongo, Italian bishop of Tripoli (b. 1200)
- Guigues VII, French ruler (dauphin) of Viennois (b. 1225)
- Idris al-Wathiq (or Abu Dabbus), Almohad ruler (caliph)
- John Lestrange, English landowner, knight and border lord (b. 1194)
- Liu Kezhuang, Chinese poet and literary critic (b. 1187)
- Oberto Pallavicino, Italian nobleman (signore) and field captain (b. 1197)
- Vasylko Romanovych, Grand Prince of Kiev (b. 1203)
- William (III) de Beauchamp, English nobleman (b. 1215)
