= 1264 =

1264 in various calendars
Gregorian calendar	1264; MCCLXIV
Ab urbe condita	2017
Armenian calendar	713; ԹՎ ՉԺԳ
Assyrian calendar	6014
Balinese saka calendar	1185–1186
Bengali calendar	670–671
Berber calendar	2214
English Regnal year	48 Hen. 3 – 49 Hen. 3
Buddhist calendar	1808
Burmese calendar	626
Byzantine calendar	6772–6773
Chinese calendar	癸亥年 (Water Pig); 3961 or 3754 — to — 甲子年 (Wood Rat); 3962 or 3755
Coptic calendar	980–981
Discordian calendar	2430
Ethiopian calendar	1256–1257
Hebrew calendar	5024–5025
- Hindu calendars
Vikram Samvat	1320–1321
Shaka Samvat	1185–1186
Kali Yuga	4364–4365
Holocene calendar	11264
Igbo calendar	264–265
Iranian calendar	642–643
Islamic calendar	662–663
Japanese calendar	Kōchō 4 / Bun'ei 1 (文永元年)
Javanese calendar	1174–1175
Julian calendar	1264; MCCLXIV
Korean calendar	3597
Minguo calendar	648 before ROC 民前648年
Nanakshahi calendar	−204
Thai solar calendar	1806–1807
Tibetan calendar	ཆུ་མོ་ཕག་ལོ་ (female Water-Boar); 1390 or 1009 or 237 — to — ཤིང་ཕོ་བྱི་བ་ལོ་ (male Wood-Rat); 1391 or 1010 or 238

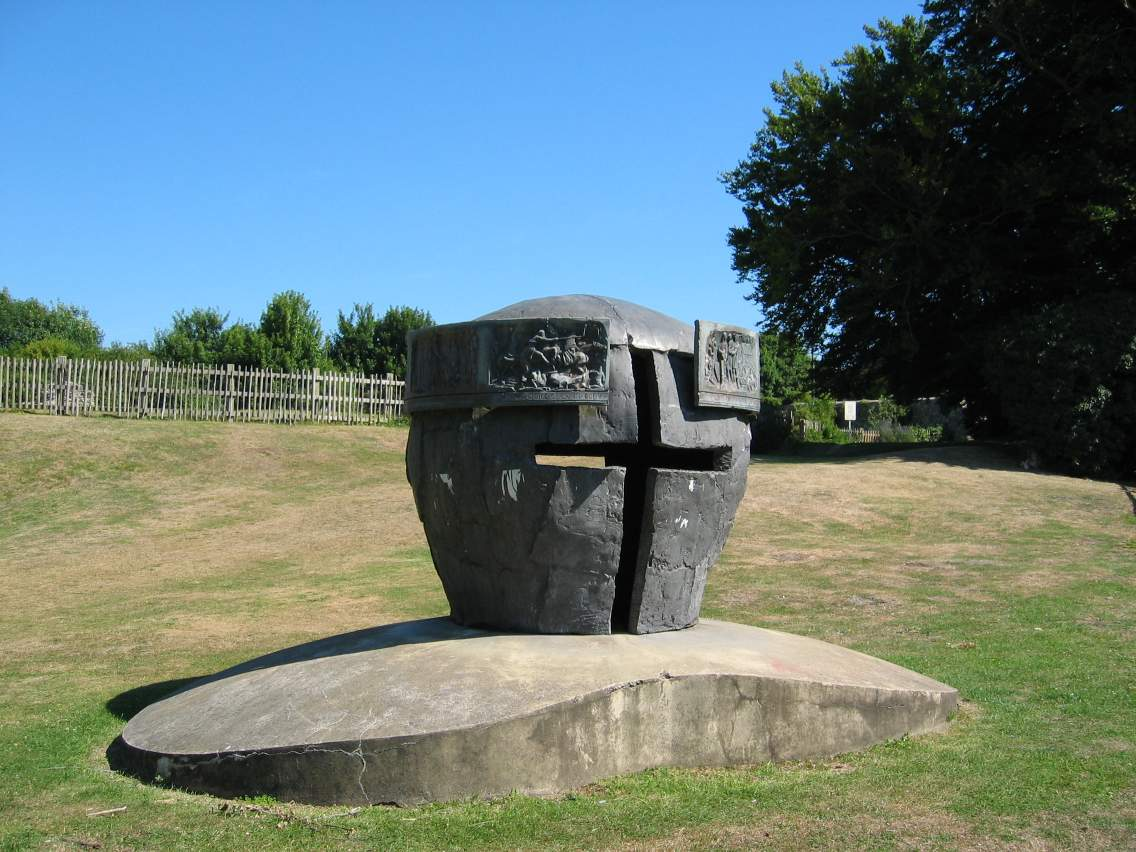
Monument of the Battle of Lewes

Year 1264 (MCCLXIV) was a leap year starting on Tuesday of the Julian calendar.

== Events ==
=== By place ===
==== Byzantine Empire ====
- Spring – Battle of Makryplagi: Constantine Palaiologos (half-brother of Michael VIII) resumes operations against the Principality of Achaea. He advances up in northern Elis, and sets up his camp at a location called "St. Nicholas of Mesiskli". Prince William of Villehardouin with his own troops marches to meet him and arrays his men ready for battle. The Byzantine vanguard under Michael Kantakouzenos, ride forth from the Byzantine lines, but the force is ambushed and Michael is killed by the Achaeans. Constantine retreats and goes on to lay siege to the fortress of Nikli. There, Turkish mercenaries (some 1,000 horsemen), confront him and demand that he pay them their arrears of 6 months. Constantine refuses, whereupon the Turkish troops desert to William. He decides to raise the siege and departs for Constantinople. He leaves Alexios Philes with a force and marches towards Messenia, where he occupies the passes, situated near Gardiki Castle. William, reinforced by the Turkish contingent, marches to Messenia to attack the Byzantines, despite their holding strong positions on the high ground. The first two attacks are beaten off, but during the third attack, the Byzantines flee in panic. Alexios, along with many Greek nobles, is captured.

==== Europe ====
- August 8 – Mudéjar Revolt: Muslim rebel forces, aided by allies from Algeciras and Tarifa, take the town of Jerez de la Frontera after defeating the outnumbered Castilian garrison led by Nuño González de Lara ("the Good"). The rebels are supported by Muhammad I, ruler of the Emirate of Granada, while King Alfonso X of Castile ("the Wise") is allied with Aragon. The rebels manage to capture Murcia, as well as several smaller towns.
- August 14 – Battle of Saseno: The Genoese fleet (16 galleys) manages to trick and capture an entire Venetian trade convoy near Saseno Island off the coast of Albania. The captured merchandise and ships are valued at more than 100,000 Genoese pounds, an enormous sum for the period, of which 30,000 goes into the Genoese treasury through the sale of the plunder.
- October 9 – Reconquista: Castilian forces under Alfonso X counter-attack and recapture Jerez de la Frontera after a siege. The rebel-held towns of Vejer de la Frontera, Rota, and Sanlúcar de Barrameda also fall to Alfonso. Muslims in the retaken towns are expelled and the mosques in Jerez are converted to churches. The region is settled by Christians from elsewhere.
- December 10 – Hungarian Civil War, a dynastic conflict, erupts between King Béla IV and his son, Duke Stephen. Hungarian forces under Ladislaus II Kán invades Stephen's realm and push forward unhindered penetrating the valley of the Mureș River in the southern part of Transylvania. Stephen's army halts Ladislaus' advance at the Fortress of Deva (modern Romania).
- Winter – The War of the Thuringian Succession ends after 17 years with the state of Hesse gaining its independence from Thuringia and becoming the Landgraviate of Hesse, a principality of the Holy Roman Empire.
- Approximate date – High Duke Bolesław V the Chaste promulgates legal protection for Jewish communities in Lesser Poland, including protection from kidnapping and forcible baptism of Jewish children.

==== British Isles ====
- January 23 – King Louis IX of France ("the Saint") issues the Mise of Amiens, a settlement between King Henry III of England and his rebellious barons under Simon de Montfort, heavily favouring the former – which leads to the Second Barons' War. At Amiens, Henry accuses the barons of destroying his castles and laying waste to royal lands. For this he demands a compensation of some £300,000 and 200,000 marks, which is defended by Louis.
- April 5 – Battle of Northampton: English forces under Roger Mortimer, advance over the water meadows south of Northampton to attack its main gate with engines. Meanwhile, another party rides clockwise along the built-up area's western perimeter, looking for an easier entrance. While the townsmen entrust to hold up the initial attack, the outflanking detachment founds a breach in the garden wall of St. Andrew's Priory, at the north of the town. Simon de Montfort the Younger (son of Simon de Montfort) reacts to the break-in – riding upon his horse with his squire, and some followers to contest the breach. But Simon is captured and throws the defenders into disarray. Simon de Montfort mounts a rearguard to relieve his son, but on April 6 the castle falls.
- April 17–19 – English rebels under Simon de Montfort beset Rochester from two directions in a pincer movement from north and south. The garrison sortie burns the suburbs to deprive the rebels of cover. Initial assaults on the bridge the next morning are repulsed by Roger de Leybourne. In the evening, however, supported by archers shooting across the river, Simon launches an amphibious assault, wind and current carrying his fireship across to set fire to the bridge defenses. The rebels capture the castle's outer bailey and the garrison retires inside the keep on April 19. Meanwhile, rebels under Gilbert de Clare ("the Red Earl") occupy the cathedral. The siege then boggs down, Simon receives reports of a relief force and orders to withdraw on April 26.
- April – Gilbert de Clare leads a massacre of the Jews at Canterbury, during the outbreak of the Second Barons' War. In the meantime, another of de Montfort's followers, John FitzJohn, leads a massacre against the Jews in London. The Jewish communities of Northampton, Winchester, Cambridge, and Lincoln are looted. The archæ (official chest of records) is destroyed or deposited at the headquarters of de Montfort's supporters at Ely.
- May 14 – Battle of Lewes: English rebels led by Simon de Montfort defeat Henry III and Prince Edward ("the Lord Edward"), at Lewes. Henry leaves the safety of Lewes Castle and St. Pancras Priory, to engage the rebels. Edward routes part of the rebel army (some 5,000 men) with a cavalry charge, but during the battle de Montfort's forces capture both Henry and Edward, making Simon the "uncrowned king of England" for 15 months.
- May – Simon de Montfort marches on London but the drawbridge on London Bridge has been raised by the Lord Mayor. Simon has the support of the Londoners, who manage to lower the bridge allowing him into the city. Henry III is forced to pardon the rebel nobles and reinstates the Provisions of Oxford. With Henry's power diminished, Simon announces that all debts owed to the Jews would be canceled.
- June – Simon de Montfort summons Parliament in London to confirm new constitutional arrangements. Two knights are summoned for each county, and are allowed to comment on general matters of state – the first time this has occurred. In France, Queen Eleanor of Provence, wife of Henry III, makes plans for an invasion of England with the support of Louis IX OF France.
- June – The Lord Edward is held captive at Wallingford Castle, but after an escape attempt he is moved to Kenilworth Castle.
- June 18 – The Parliament of Ireland meets at Castledermot in County Kildare, the first definitely known meeting of this Irish legislature.
- December 24 – The title Baron de Ros, the oldest held peerage title, is created by writ of summons during the reign of Henry III.

==== Mongol Empire ====
- The Toluid Civil War ends: Kublai Khan defeats his brother and pretender to the title of "Great Khan", Ariq Böke, who surrenders to Kublai on August 24. He is imprisoned and with the Chinese support behind him, Kublai is acknowledged by the rulers of the western khanates and as sole ruler of the Mongol Empire. He moves his capital from Shangdu in Inner Mongolia, to the Chinese city of Dadu (modern-day Beijing).

==== Asia ====
- February – The Japanese era Kōchō ends and the Bun'ei era begins during the reign of the 14-year-old Emperor Kameyama (until 1275).

=== By topic ===
==== Education ====
- September 14 – Walter de Merton formally completes the foundation of the House of Scholars of Merton (later Merton College, Oxford), to provide education in Malden and the University of Oxford.

==== Religion ====
- August 11 – By the papal bull Transiturus, Pope Urban IV declares the Feast of Corpus Christi (festum corporis) to be celebrated by the entire Catholic Church.
- October 2 – Urban IV dies after a pontificate of 3-years and is succeeded by Clement IV. His papal election occurs at Perugia, which will last for four months.
- Approximate date – Thomas Aquinas completes his theological work Summa contra Gentiles.

== Births ==
- January 21 – Alexander, Scottish heir apparent (d. 1284)
- February 2 – Sancha of Portugal, Portuguese princess (d. 1279)
- May 26 – Koreyasu, Japanese prince and shogun (d. 1326)
- June 29 – Darmabala ("Protector of the Law"), Mongol prince (d. 1292)
- Ahmed al-Ghubrini, Hafsid scholar and chronicler (d. 1314)
- Louis of France, French prince and heir apparent (d. 1276)
- Nichiin, Japanese Buddhist monk and disciple (d. 1329)
- Wang Qinghui, Chinese concubine and poet (d. 1288)

== Deaths ==
- February 16 – Azzo VII d'Este, marquis of Ferrara (b. 1205)
- April 25 – Roger de Quincy, Scotto-Norman nobleman (b. 1195)
- May 17 – Wartislaw III, Polish nobleman and knight (b. 1210)
- July 10 – Isabella de Clare, English noblewoman (b. 1226)
- August 1 – John I ("the Theologian"), German nobleman
- September 12 – Hōjō Nagatoki, Japanese regent (b. 1227)
- October 2 – Urban IV, pope of the Catholic Church (b. 1195)
- November 11 – Farinata degli Uberti, Italian nobleman (b. 1212)
- November 16 – Lizong (or Zhao Yun), Chinese emperor (b. 1205)
- Andrey II Yaroslavich, Grand Prince of Vladimir (b. 1222)
- Danylo Romanovych, ruler of Galicia–Volhynia (b. 1201)
- Domentijan, Serbian monk and philosopher (b. 1210)
- Fujiwara no Ieyoshi, Japanese waka poet (b. 1192)
- Hugh l'Aleman, Outremer knight and heir apparent
- Isabella of Cyprus, Cypriotic princess and regent
- John II of Beirut, Outremer nobleman and knight
- Nicholas I de Soules, Scottish nobleman and knight
- Perceval Doria, Genoese military leader and poet
- Robert de Vieuxpont, English nobleman and knight
- Approximate date
  - Dharmasvamin, Tibetan monk and explorer (b. 1197)
  - Vincent of Beauvais, French friar and encyclopedist
