= Michael Kantakouzenos =

Michael Kantakouzenos or Cantacuzenus (Greek: Μιχαήλ Καντακουζηνός) can refer to:

- Michael Kantakouzenos (died 1264), Byzantine general
- Michael Kantakouzenos (died 1316), Byzantine governor in the Morea, father of John VI Kantakouzenos
- Michael Kantakouzenos Şeytanoğlu (died 1578), Phanariote Greek magnate, founder of the modern branch of the Kantakouzenos family
