= Nichijū =

Buddhist monk

- 日什

Personal life
- Born: 1314
- Died: 1392 (aged 77–78)

Religious life
- Religion: Buddhism
- School: Nichiren Buddhism
- Sect: Nichiren-shū; Nichijū-ha (Kempon Hokke)

Senior posting
- Teacher: Nichijin

Nichijū (日什) (1314–1392) was an early Nichiren Buddhist who founded the Nichijū-ha subsect, the origin of Kempon Hokke. He was converted from Tendai Buddhism by Nichijin in 1379, at the age of 65.
