= Kempon Hokke =

Branch of Nichiren Buddhism

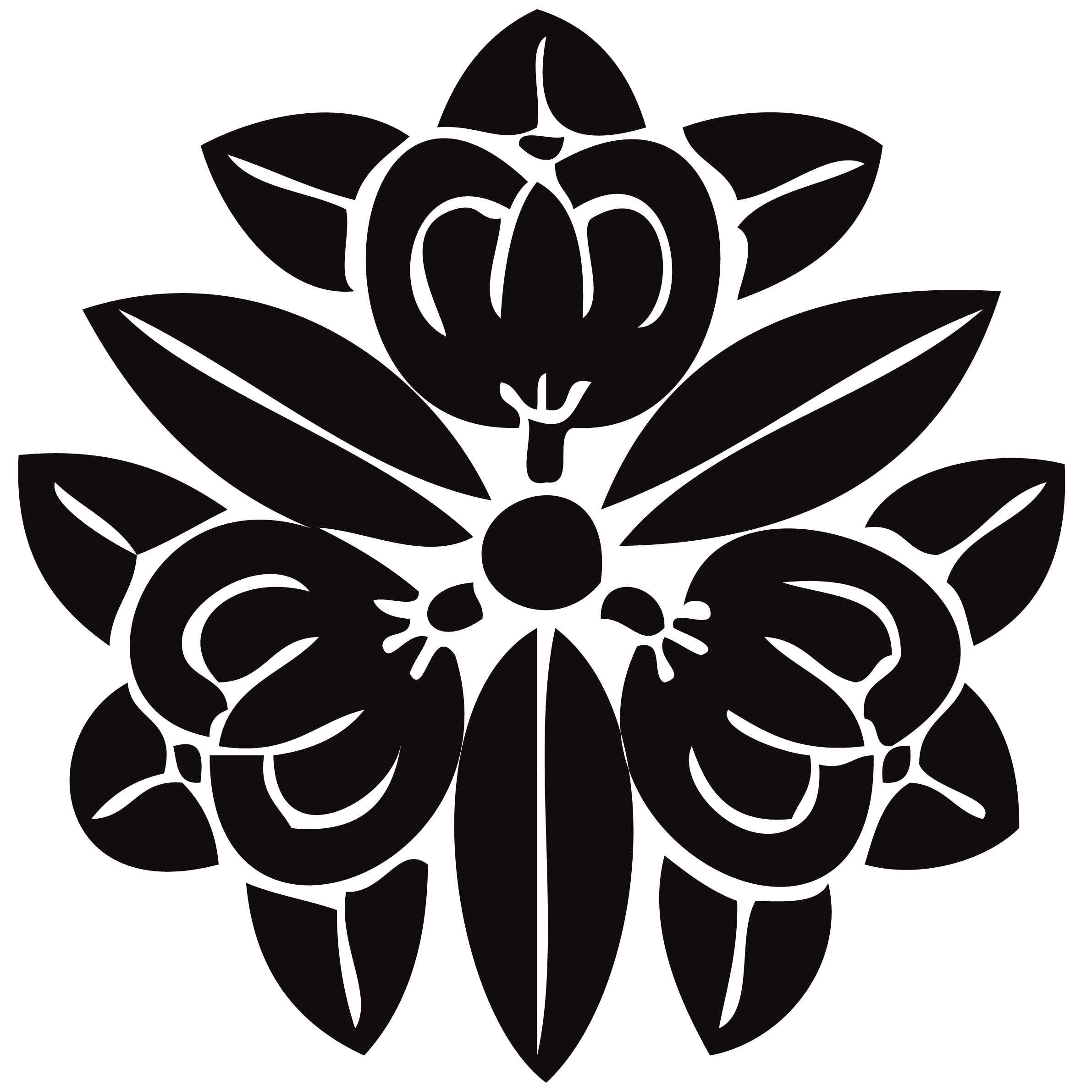
Kempon Hokke Shū logo

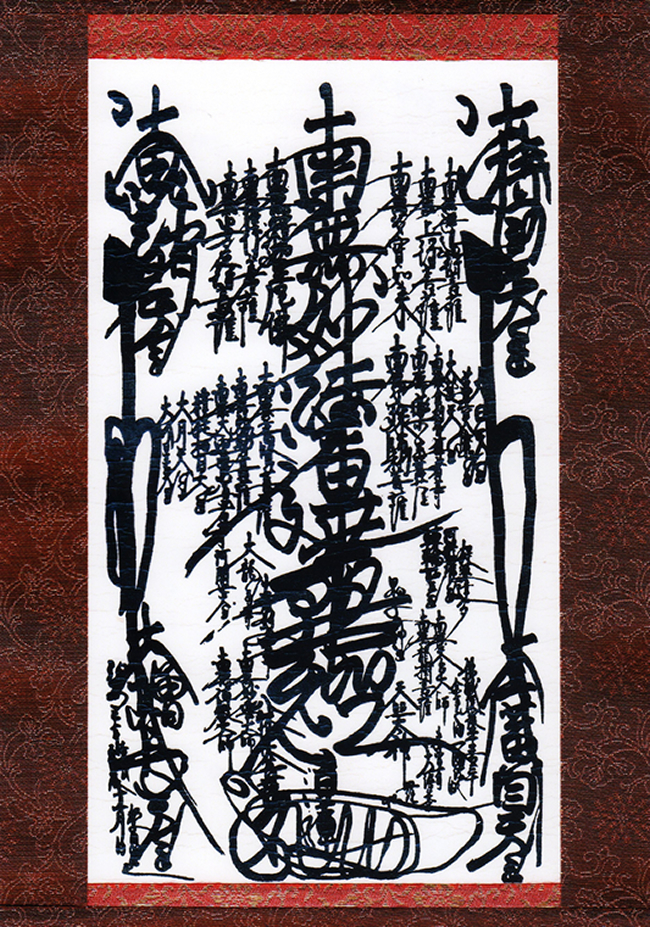
Kempon Hokke Shū Gohonzon

Kempon Hokke-shū (顕本法華宗) is a branch of Nichiren Buddhism based on the teachings of 13th-century Japanese monk Nichiren. It was founded by Nichijū in 1384. In Japan it has a membership of about 100,000 households and several lay members overseas. The international branch of Kempon Hokke Shu is currently headed by Rev. Sinyou Tsuchiya.

== Overview ==
Kempon Hokke's head temple, Myōman-ji (妙満寺), is located in Kyoto. Kempon Hokke Nichiren's religious writings inspired Nichijū to leave the Tendai sect to learn more about Nichiren by visiting the various Nichiren temples. Nichijū believed that these temples had already drifted away from Nichiren's spirit and teachings and founded his own temple, Myōman-ji. In 1898, Myomanji-ha incorporated as the Kempon Hokke school and Honda Nissho (1867–1931) was appointed its first head administrator.

== Beliefs and Practice ==
Much of Kempon Hokke's underlying teachings are extensions of Tendai (天台, Cn: Tiantai) thought. They include much of its worldview and its rationale for criticism of Buddhist schools that do not acknowledge the Lotus Sutra to be Buddhism's highest teaching, as stated by Buddha Shakyamuni. For example, Kempon Hokke doctrine extends Tendai's classification of the Buddhist sutras into five time periods and eight categories (五時八教, goji-hakkyō), its theory of 3,000 interpenetrating realms within a single life-moment (一念三千, Ichinen Sanzen), and its view of the Three Truths (三諦, Santai).

Kempon Hokke teach that to be a disciple of Nichiren, one must:

- Chant Namu Myoho Renge Kyo to the Object of Devotion of the Three Great Secret Laws (Gohonzon)
- Believe exclusively in The Lotus Sutra
- Believe exclusively in Shakyamuni Buddha of the 16th Chapter of the Lotus Sutra
- Tell others to do the same
- Base one's conversion practices on Nichiren's writing, the 'Rissho Ankoku Ron' (On Establishing The Correct Teaching for the Peace of The Land)

Kempon Hokke members chant parts of the Lotus Sutra, as well as the Daimoku, Namu-myoho-renge-kyo, as their primary practice. Kempon Hokke claim to practice shakubuku towards non-believers, and shōju towards believers.

The difference of each school's traditional doctrine.

Nichiren Shu was insisting that the Eternal Buddha as the truth of universe is Namu Myoho Renge Kyo Tathagata.

Nichiren Sho Shu insists that Namu Myoho Renge Kyo Tathagata as the Eternal Buddha is Nichiren Daishonin himself.

Those rely on Ongikuden (Record of the Orally Transmitted Teachings) which is a forged letter.

Honmon Butsuryu Shu insists that eight chapters (Happon) of Honmon of the Lotus Sutra are the prophecy book which Nichiren shonin appears to save people. They worship only the words of Namu Myoho Renge Kyo, but not the Eternal Buddha Sakyamuni.

Kempon Hokke Shu insists that the Eternal Buddha is the Buddha Sakyamuni himself and that the Eternal Buddha Sakyamuni exists in each people's mind as the absolute spirit. It relies on the teachings of the Lotus Sutra and Nichiren's.
