= Nichijin =

Japanese Nichiren Buddhist monk

- 日陣

Personal life
- Born: 1339
- Died: 1419 (aged 79–80)

Religious life
- Religion: Buddhism
- School: Nichiren Buddhism
- Sect: Nichiren-shū; Hokkeshū Jinmon Ryū

Senior posting
- Teacher: Nichiin
- Students: Nichijū, Nichiin

Nichijin (日陣, May 30, 1339 – June 14, 1419) was a Japanese Nichiren Buddhist monk and founder of the Hokkeshū Jinmon Ryū subsect in 1406. He became head priest of Honjo‑ji Temple in 1369 and taught the shoretsu doctrine, spreading his teachings in Kyoto and other regions. Nichijin studied under Nichiryū (日龍) at Honjo-ji (本成寺) beginning at age 8, then under Nichijō (日静) at 17. He opposed rival interpretations of Nichiren Buddhism and helped establish the Jinmon branch as a distinct lineage. He also established the Jōreizan Honkō-ji Temple in 1383.

While studying on Mount Chōkai, Nichijin debated with a Tendai scholar, who converted to Nichiren Buddhism in 1379 and took the name Nichijū. He also converted a Shingon priest, who became Nichiin. He also converted a Shingon priest who changed his name to Nichiin. Nichijin disappeared in 1419, it is believed he died while on a pilgrimage.
