= Sapia Salvani =

Sienese noblewoman (1210 – 1278)

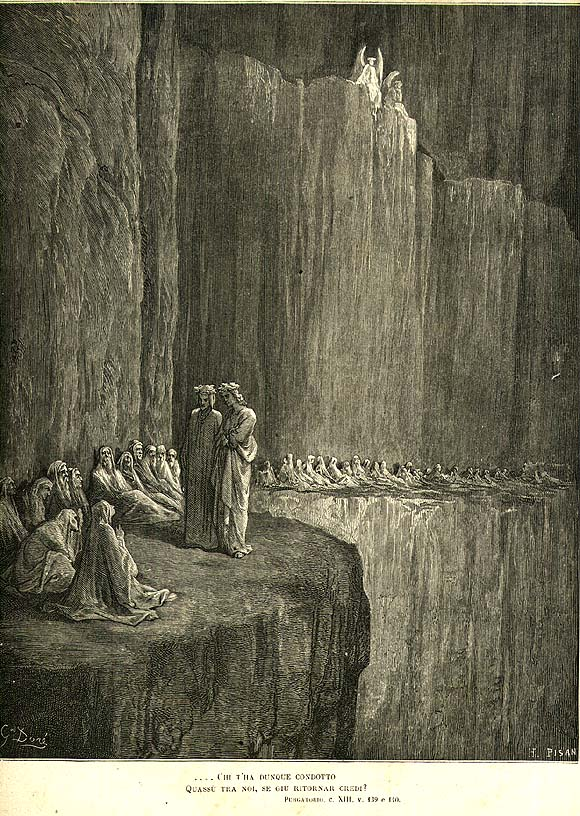
Dante and Virgil meeting Sapia in Purgatory, as illustrated by Gustave Doré

Sapia Salvani (Siena, c. 1210 – Colle di Val d'Elsa, c. 1278) was a Sienese noblewoman. In Dante Alighieri's Divine Comedy, she is placed among the envious souls of Purgatory for having rejoiced when her fellow Sienese townspeople, led by her paternal nephew Provenzano Salvani, lost to the Florentine Guelphs at the Battle of Colle Val d'Elsa.

== Biography ==
Sapia was born into the powerful Ghibelline Salvani family around 1210. Around 1230, she married Ghinibaldo Saracini (also known as Viviano Saracini), lord of Castiglione Alto, to whom she mothered five children. In 1265, Sapia and her husband funded the creation of the hospital Santa Maria dei Pellegrini, located near Castiglione, now called Castiglione Ghinibaldi, near Monteriggioni, on the Via Francigena, an ancient pilgrimage route to Rome. She was widowed by 1268.

On 17 June 1269 Sapia witnessed the Battle of Colle Val d'Elsa from the family castle of Castiglione. It is said she prayed for the downfall of the Sienese and was elated when it came true. Sienese forces fought against Florentine forces, ending in the defeat of the Sienese and the death of her paternal nephew, Provenzano Salvani, who was decapitated and his head paraded around the city on a stake.

After the battle, Sapia donated much of her wealth to the hospital she founded with her husband. Though her exact date of death is unknown, she was last mentioned in 1274 when she made a donation to that hospital. She must have died before 1289, as that is the date of death of Pietro Pettinaio, who, according to Dante's Divine Comedy, prayed for her soul's advancement through Purgatory.

== In Dante's Divine Comedy ==
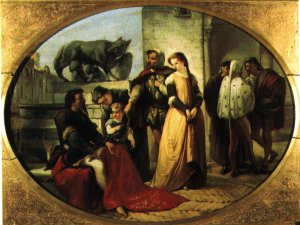
Provenzano Salvani before Sapia in the Piazza del Campo by Bernardo Celentano

Sapia appears as a character in Canto 13 of Purgatorio, the second canticle of Dante's Divine Comedy. Aside from Pia de' Tolomei, Sapia is the only woman among the pilgrims in Purgatorio to be given a speaking role. She is located on the terrace of envy, where envious souls are punished by being dressed in rough sacks the color of rocks and having their eyes sewn shut with iron wire.

While Dante and Virgil walk through this terrace, Dante stops to ask about the condition of the souls there. Sapia responds by telling of her life, most notably her sinful expression of gratitude when her kinsfolk fell to the Florentines. During her speech, Sapia never mentions her nephew Provenzano by name, possibly hinting at her belief that Provenzano held a position better suited for her husband.

my heart filled with such boundless joy
that recklessly I turned my face to God,
crying: "Now I do not fear you any more,"
as the blackbird said after a glint of sunshine.

— Dante Alighieri, Purgatorio 13.120-123

After telling her story, Sapia expresses her remorse at her elation seeing her townsfolk defeated by quoting an Italian folktale of a foolish blackbird that celebrates spring prematurely.

Finally, Sapia notes that though she has not been dead long, the prayers of "Pier the Comb-Seller" (typically identified with Pietro Pettinaio) have helped move through Ante-Purgatory and the terrace of pride rather quickly. She is able to discern that Dante is not yet among the dead souls, and so asks him to pray for her soul's quick advancement through Purgatory and for Dante to return to Tuscany and restore her honor among her still prideful kinsfolk.
