= Battle of Colle Val d'Elsa =

Medieval battle in Italy

- Part of Guelphs and Ghibellines
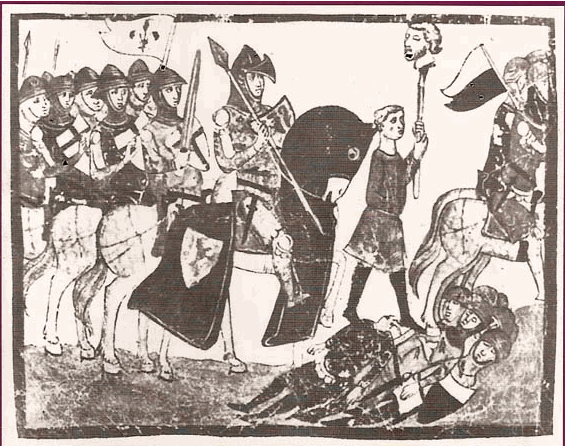
- A Guelph carries on a spear the head of Provenzan Salvani
| Date | 16 June 1269 |
| Location | near Colle di Val d'Elsa, Tuscany present-day Italy 43.413°N 11.131°E |
| Result | Guelph victory |

Belligerents
| Ghibellines: Siena | Guelphs: Charles of Anjou; Florence |

Commanders and leaders
| Provenzano Salvani † | Jean Britaud |

Strength
| 9,400; 1,400 cavalry 8,000 infantry | 1,100; 800 cavalry 300 infantry |

Casualties and losses
| Heavy | |

The battle of Colle di Val d'Elsa took place between 16 and 17 June 1269 at Colle di Val d'Elsa between the Ghibelline troops of Siena and the Guelph troops of Charles of Anjou and Florence, represented by fewer than 200 knights commanded by Neri de' Bardi.

== Background ==
After the battle of Montaperti where Siena, a Ghibelline city, defeated Guelph Florence on 4 September 1260, Colle Val d'Elsa found itself in the Guelph camp. Indeed, Colle had ended up as a center for many former citizens of Siena who, finding themselves on the wrong (Guelph) side, had been persecuted and driven into exile by Siena's dominant Ghibelline party.

On 27 August 1268 yet another battle took place on the edge of Rome between King Charles of Anjou, rushing to the defense of the Pope, and Conradin leading a Ghibelline army: the outcome was a Guelph victory. But the Ghibellines, despite the defeat, continued their persecution of Guelphs and took possession of the Castle of Ulignano.

Then the surrounding municipalities (especially Colle and San Gimignano) decided to attack the castle and chase the fugitives to Pisa and Poggibonsi, until the bulk of the Ghibelline militias found themselves within the walls of Siena and Pisa.

== Battle ==
In June 1269 Captain Provenzano Salvani and Count Guido Novello left Siena with 1,400 knights and 8,000 infantry from Siena, Pisa, Germany, Spain, Florentine exiles, and other Tuscans, camping in the Badia plateau near the Spugna Abbey.

The Colle inhabitants, who did not expect this siege, locked themselves up between the fortifications of Colle Alta (Higher Colle) and sent messengers to seek help from Florence.

The next day, 400 French horse under the command of Marshal Jean Britaud (known in Italy as Giambertoldo), vicar of King Charles of Anjou in Tuscany, arrived in Colle Val d'Elsa followed by another contingent of 400 Florentine horse. The Florentine foot, except for a fraction, did however not arrive in time for the battle.

During the night the Marshal lined the French over the walls of Colle Alta and conquered the Ghibelline castle inside Colle. Next morning, the Ghibelline tower signaled the approach of troops sent from Florence (actually the Florence army was still in Barberino), and ordered the trumpets to be sounded and people to shout loudly to persuade the Ghibellines that combat troops were many more than they expected. It seems that the trick worked, because in the early morning the Ghibellines retreated to San Marziale, and remained on the hill Poggio ai Berci.

Marshal Giambertoldo ordered the Colle militias to get around that hill and to remain hidden until the moment he appeared with the insignia of Florence in front of the Siena troops and attacked them. During his advance the Marshal tore down the bridge of San Marziale to prevent a retreat of his soldiers, but also to slow down the escape of Siena.

Once in sight of the Ghibellines, Gianbertoldo started the battle, while Colle inhabitants were shouting and waving their weapons, giving the feeling that more troops were waiting to attack.

Captain Salvani threatened, promised compensation, and shouted, but the Ghibelline soldiers fought only briefly and badly, retired soon and fled. Many were hunted down and killed by the Guelphs, while Salvani, not wanting to return to Siena defeated, threw himself into the fray and was killed by Regolino Tolomei, his sworn enemy.

== Aftermath ==
Gianbertoldo had managed, with only 800 horsemen and 300 infantry of Colle, to cunningly defeat an army of no less than 9,400 men. All this happened under the eyes of Provenzano's paternal aunt Sapia Salvani of Siena, sung by Dante's Divine Comedy (Purgatorio, Canto XIII et seq.), who followed the battle, praying for the defeat of her countrymen.
