= Genoese lira =

Currency of the Republic of Genoa from 1138 to 1797

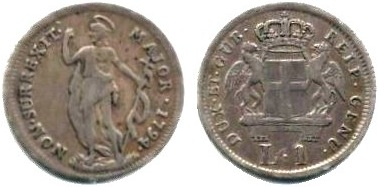
Genoese silver lira of 1794

The Genoese lira (Italian: Lira genovese) was the currency of the Republic of Genoa until 1797. It was divided into 20 soldi, each of 12 denari.

== History ==
The mint in the Republic of Genoa began its production around 1138, with coins introduced in line with similar versions issued in the rest of Europe, as follows:

- The silver denaro in 1138, containing 1.06 grams of 1/3 fine silver (or 84.8 g fine silver in a lira);
- The silver grosso in 1172 worth 4 denari, of 1.4 g of 23/24 fine silver (or 80.5 g fine silver in a lira);
- The gold Genovino d'oro in 1252, at about the same time as the Florentine florin; of 3.5 g fine gold, and worth 1/2 lira (each lira worth either 7 g fine gold or 70 g fine silver);
- The testone or 1-lira coin before 1500, containing about 13 g of 23/24 fine silver (or 12.5g fine). It was the highest-valued Italian coin unit in the end of the 15th century.

Genoese currency became important in the 16th century during the Golden age of Genoese banking, with the Spanish Empire funnelling its massive wealth from Spanish America through the Bank of Saint George. Genoa then introduced new coins, namely:

- The large scudo d'argento, copying the Milanese ducaton, with 36.64 g fine silver, and worth 4 1/2 lire as of 1602;
- The gold scudo d'oro, copying the Spanish escudo, with 3.026 g fine gold, and also worth 4 1/2 lire as of 1602;
- The gold doppio or 2-scudo coin, also known as the doubloon or pistole.

With the decline in the fortunes of the Genoese banks and the Spanish Empire in the 17th century, however, the Genoese lira also depreciated substantially. The silver scudo's value increased to 6.5 lire in 1646, 7.4 lire in 1671, and 8.74 lire just before the Austrian occupation of Genoa in 1746.

The lira in existence from the 12th century was later called the lira moneta buona (good money) or lira fuori banco (outside the bank) to disambiguate from the huge array of auxiliary units used by Genoa's banking industry to account for various currencies brought there over the centuries. Each lira or unit below also divided into 20 soldi or 240 denari; the various units are as follows:

- The lira moneta buona or lira fuori banco, with 4.19 g fine silver in 1746;
- The lira banco worth 1.15 lire, the accounting unit of deposits in the Bank of Saint George, and also dividing into soldi banco and denari banco;
- The lira moneta di paghi worth 1.214 lire for counting Spanish dollars, and the lira di cartulario worth 1.942 lire for accounting bullion sales (the various units tied up as follows: Scudo d'Argento = 8.74 lire = 7.6 lire banco = 7.2 lire moneta di paghi = 4.5 lire di cartulario);
- Other units used for exchange quotations: the pezza worth 5.75 lire, the Scudo d'Argento worth 8.74 lire, the Scudo d'Oro worth 10.81 lire, and the Scudo di Cambio worth 4.6 lire; each of these units also divide into soldi and denari.

After the 1746 siege the Genoese lira was devalued with the scudo d'argento rising from 8.74 to 9.5 lire (or 3.86 g fine silver in a lira). When the period of the Republic ended in 1797, the one lira coin weighed 4.16 g at 8/9 fine, equal to 3.70 g fine silver or 0.239 g fine gold.

From 1797 the Genoese lira and all its auxiliary units were replaced by the French franc, and afterwards the Italian lira. However, the Mint of Genoa remained in operation by issuing coins until 1860.

== See also ==
- History of coins in Italy
