= Fujiwara no Ieyoshi =

Japanese poet

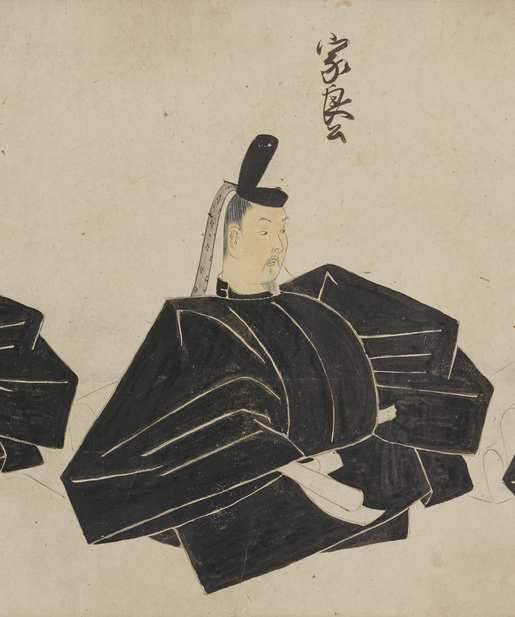
- Portrait from the Tenshi Sekkan Miei
- Born: 1192
- Died: 1264 (aged 71–72)
- Other name: Kinugasa Ieyoshi (衣笠家良)
- Occupations: Court noble, waka poet
- Known for: New Thirty-Six Immortals of Poetry

Fujiwara no Ieyoshi (藤原家良; 1192–1264), also known as Kinugasa Ieyoshi (衣笠家良), was a waka poet and court noble active in the early to mid Kamakura period. He was the second son of the major counselor Awataguchi Tadayoshi and reached the rank of Senior Second Rank and the office of Naidaijin (Inner Minister), by which title he was known as Kinugasa Naidaijin. He is counted among the New Thirty-Six Immortals of Poetry (新三十六歌仙, Shinsanjūrokkasen).

== Life ==
Ieyoshi was born in 1192. His father Tadayoshi had little political skill but was an accomplished poet, with 69 of his poems included in imperial anthologies. Ieyoshi's paternal grandmother was a daughter of Fujiwara no Akisuke, the noted poet included in the Ogura Hyakunin Isshu. His maternal grandfather, Fujiwara no Sadayoshi, was politically capable and rose to the unusual position of provisional major counselor within the Michitsuna line; both his poetic gift and political standing are thought to have passed to Ieyoshi through these two family lines.

In 1200, Ieyoshi's coming-of-age ceremony was conducted by the Minister of the Right, Konoe Iezane, and he was granted the rank of Junior Fifth, Lower. He was made a chamberlain in 1201 and raised to Junior Fifth, Upper in 1202, when he was also permitted to wear forbidden court colors. He was frequently criticized by Fujiwara no Teika for behaving improperly at court; since Teika had likewise described Tadayoshi as being of an "unrefined nature," Ieyoshi's poor manners are thought to have been inherited from his father.

He was promoted steadily over the following decades: to Senior Fifth, Lower in 1203; Minor Captain of the Left Palace Guards in 1204, while concurrently serving as provisional governor of Echizen from 1205; Junior Fourth, Lower in 1206; and Junior Fourth, Upper and Middle Captain of the Left Palace Guards in 1207. In 1209 he was raised to Senior Fourth, Lower and appointed provisional governor of Kai; his maternal grandfather Sadayoshi died the same year. He reached Junior Third Rank in 1211, becoming a court noble, and went on to serve as provisional governor of Bitchū before being raised to Senior Third Rank in 1214, Junior Second Rank in 1220, and Senior Second Rank in 1222. In early 1225 he was promoted directly to the office of chūnagon (Middle Counselor), bypassing the intermediate posts of sangi and provisional chūnagon.

His father Tadayoshi died in the fifth month of 1225. According to the Meigetsuki, Ieyoshi did not attend the imperial procession of 1226 after being passed over in rank by Sanjō Saneshika the previous month. His attendance at court increased, however, once Konoe Chōshi was installed as consort to Emperor Go-Horikawa, and in 1227 he was appointed provisional major counselor. His elevation to chūnagon appears to have moved him deeply; a poem he composed on the occasion was later included in the Mandaishū.

The Jōkyū War broke out in 1221. Ieyoshi's activities during the conflict are not recorded, but he is presumed to have followed the direction of the heads of his family's senior branch, the Konoe family, Konoe Motomichi and Iezane. In the aftermath, as attendants close to the retired emperor Go-Toba fell from favor, Ieyoshi, who had not been among them, began to rise quickly. Around this time he gained the trust of Kujō Michiie, who received him warmly during a visit to his residence in 1237 and repeatedly asked him to serve as presiding officer at court ceremonies, a role Ieyoshi consistently declined.

In 1231, Ieyoshi played the biwa at the birth of Prince Hidehito, later Emperor Shijō; his performance was harshly criticized, and he is said to have devoted himself afterward to further practice. He was promoted to major counselor at the end of 1237 and became Inner Minister in 1240, when a ministerial banquet was held in his honor at the residence of Shigenoi Kimimitsu. He resigned the post the following year. Despite his father's political shortcomings, Ieyoshi's rise to the office of Inner Minister is attributed both to his own political ability and, as noted above, to the standing of his mother's family.

Ieyoshi died on the 10th day of the ninth month of 1264, at the age of 73. His portrait survives in the Tenshi Sekkan Miei (Portraits of Emperors and Regents).

== As a poet ==
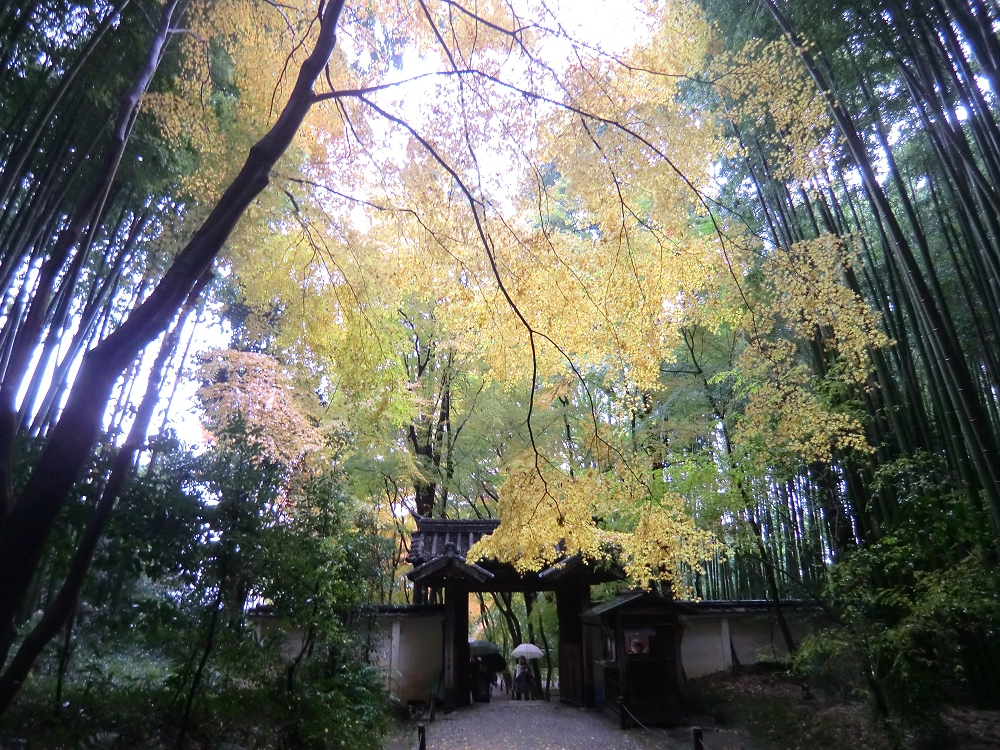
Jizō-in on Mount Kinugasa, site of Ieyoshi's mountain retreat

Ieyoshi became a pupil of the provisional middle counselor Fujiwara no Teika at an early age and excelled in waka. The Kinugasa Naifu Kanan Shi, a letter from Teika to Ieyoshi, contains Teika's critical assessment of his poetry. While in office he submitted poems to poetry contests (uta-awase) and maintained ties with poets such as Hamuro Mitsutoshi and Konoe Motohira; a record survives of him discussing waka with Motohira in 1262.

At Retired Emperor Go-Toba's forty-five-round poetry contest of 1215, Ieyoshi was paired against Bōmon Tadanobu, a close attendant of the retired emperor, and received a harsh judgment of defeat by consensus. This is attributed both to Tadanobu's standing as a court favorite and to Ieyoshi's branch of the Konoe family being relatively distant from poetic circles.

After 1218, Ieyoshi did not submit poems in public settings for a long period, likely owing to the disruption of the Jōkyū War and to the fact that poetic activity at the time centered on the Kujō family rather than his own house.

He resigned as Inner Minister in the fourth month of 1242, and after Teika's death that August, devoted himself chiefly to compiling anthologies, including the Mandaishū. In his final years he served as one of the compilers of the Shoku Kokin Wakashū. His personal poetry collection is known as the Kinugasa Naifu Ei (Collection of the Kinugasa Inner Minister), and 118 of his poems were included in imperial anthologies from the Shin Chokusen Wakashū onward.

=== Poetry-related timeline ===
- 1214, 30 September: submitted poems to the Gekkei Unkaku Netami uta-awase.
- 1215, 2 June: submitted poems to Retired Emperor Go-Toba's forty-five-round poetry contest.
- 1216, 1 November: submitted poems to a palace poetry contest on the topic "looking at new snow above the pines."
- 1236, 13 September: submitted poems to the Minamoto no Michikata Kanjin Iwashimizu five-poem contest.
- 1248, around 18 January: ordered by Retired Emperor Go-Saga to compose the Hōji hyakushu (Hōji hundred-poem sequence). The same year he compiled the Mandaishū, a project originally begun by Hamuro Mitsutoshi.
- 1262, 18 June: discussed waka with Konoe Motohira.

== Court career ==
The following follows the Kugyō Bunin.

- 1200, 3 April: coming-of-age ceremony; granted Junior Fifth, Lower.
- 1201, 29 January: appointed chamberlain.
- 1202, 5 January: raised to Junior Fifth, Upper. 18 November: permitted forbidden court colors.
- 1203, 29 October: raised to Senior Fifth, Lower.
- 1204, 12 April: appointed Minor Captain of the Left Palace Guards.
- 1205, 29 January: concurrently appointed provisional governor of Echizen.
- 1206, 5 January: raised to Junior Fourth, Lower; retained his captaincy.
- 1207, early January: raised to Junior Fourth, Upper. 13 January: transferred to Middle Captain of the Right Palace Guards.
- 1209, 13 January: concurrently appointed provisional governor of Kai. 10 April: apparently transferred to Middle Captain of a different guards division. 9 December: raised to Senior Fourth, Lower.
- 1211, 5 January: raised to Junior Third Rank, as a reward for service at the Tōdai-ji dedication ceremony.
- 1213, 13 January: concurrently appointed provisional governor of Bitchū.
- 1214, 3 January: raised to Senior Third Rank, as a reward for the emperor's visit to his parents.
- 1220, 17 December (Jōkyū 1): raised to Junior Second Rank.
- 1222, 6 January: raised to Senior Second Rank, by imperial grant.
- 1225, 25 December (Genrin/Genkyū 1): appointed chūnagon.
- 1226, 16 January: withdrew from court for mourning. 8 March: permitted to wear a sword at court.
- 1227, 9 April: appointed provisional major counselor.
- 1238, 25 December (Katei 3): promoted to major counselor.
- 1240, 20 October: appointed Inner Minister.
- 1241, 5 April: submitted his resignation as Inner Minister.
- 1264, 10 September: died, aged 73.

== Genealogy ==
- Father: Awataguchi Tadayoshi
- Mother: a daughter of Fujiwara no Sadayoshi
- Wife: a daughter of Fujiwara no Chikayoshi (d. 1266)
  - Eldest son: Kinugasa Tsunehira (1236–1274)
- Wife: a daughter of Shōkaku
  - Son: Ryōmei (dates unknown)
- Children by an unknown mother
  - Son: Kinugasa Korehira
