= Ahmed al-Ghubrini =

Scholar, chronicler, biographer (1264)

- Title: Qadi

Personal life
- Born: 1264 Béjaïa
- Died: 1314 (aged 49–50) Tunisia
- Home town: Béjaïa
- Parent: Aba Al-Qasim Ahmed Al-Ghubrini (father)
- Notable work: 'Unwan al-diraya fi man 'urifa min al-'ulama'fi l-mi'a al-sabi'afi Bijaya [Ornament of knowledge on those known scholars of Bejaïa in the seventh century AH]

Religious life
- Religion: Sunni Islam

Ahmed al-Ghubrini was a scholar, chronicler, biographer and qadi born in Béjaïa in 1264 and originally from Djurdjura.

He was born in the year 1264 in Béjaïa and was the son of Aba Al-Qasim Ahmed Al-Ghubrini, a scholar who took over the fatwa in Tunisia. He attended seminars in the great mosque of Béjaïa and the Zitouna mosque. He was able to gain knowledge from many scholars including Abu Muhammad Abd al-Haq al-Ansari al-Baja'i, Abu al-Faris Abd al-Aziz Ibn Makhlouf, Abu Abdullah al-Tamimi al-Qalai, Muhammad al-Umayyi, Abu Abdullah al-Kinani al-Shatibi and Abu al-Hasan al-Azdi. His book 'Unwan al-diraya fi man 'urifa min al-'ulama'fi l-mi'a al-sabi'afi Bijaya [Ornament of knowledge on those known scholars of Bejaïa in the seventh century AH] contains the biographies of 149 scholars.
