= Battle of Makryplagi =

1263 battle

- Part of the Byzantine-Latin Wars
- Map of the Peloponnese (Morea) in the Middle Ages.
Date	1263/1264
Location	Makryplagi, Messenia, Greece
Result	Achaean victory

Belligerents
Byzantine Empire	Principality of Achaea

Commanders and leaders
Alexios Philes (POW); John Makrenos (POW)	William II of Villehardouin; Ancelin de Toucy

Casualties and losses
Heavy	Light

The Battle of Makryplagi or Makry Plagi was fought between the forces of the Byzantine Empire, and the Latin Principality of Achaea. The Byzantines had been weakened and demoralized by the defection of their numerous Turkish mercenaries to the Achaeans. At Makryplagi, the Byzantines suffered a heavy defeat, which together with their defeat at the Battle of Prinitza the previous year ended their attempted reconquest of the Morea.

== Background ==
After the Battle of Pelagonia (1259), the Byzantine emperor Michael VIII Palaiologos (r. 1259–1282) acquired a number of fortresses in the southeastern Peloponnese (Morea), ceded by the captured Prince of Achaea William II of Villehardouin (r. 1246–1278) in exchange for his release. William also pledged to become Michael's vassal, but as soon as he returned to the Morea he renounced this oath, and began negotiating with the Pope and other Latin powers for a joint effort against the Byzantines.

War broke out in late 1262 or 1263, when Michael VIII dispatched an expedition to the Morea. This army was composed chiefly of Turkish mercenaries and Greek troops from Asia Minor and headed by his half-brother, the sebastokrator Constantine Palaiologos. Constantine enjoyed initial success, capturing much of Laconia and advancing north, aiming to take the Achaean capital, Andravida. He was defeated, however by a far smaller Latin force at the Battle of Prinitza, and his army scattered.

== Skirmish of Mesiskli and siege of Nikli ==
In early 1263 or 1264, Constantine Palaiologos resolved to resume operations, with the final aim of subduing the Principality of Achaea for good. He assembled his troops, entered Achaean-controlled territory and advanced up to Sergiana in northern Elis, and set up his camp at a location called "St. Nicholas of Mesiskli". William with his own troops marched to meet him, and arrayed his men ready for battle. According to the Chronicle of the Morea, the head of the Byzantine vanguard, the megas konostaulos Michael Kantakouzenos, rode forth from the Byzantine lines, but his horse stumbled and he was killed by the Achaeans. Dismayed by the death of his bravest lieutenant, the sebastokrator Constantine retreated and went on to lay siege to the fortress of Nikli.

There, however, the Turkish mercenaries, over 1,000 horsemen under their leaders Melik and Shalik, confronted him and demanded that he pay them their arrears of six months. Irritated by this demand, and worried by his lack of success thus far, the sebastokrator angrily refused. They were approached, then, by the gasmouloi Anselin of Toucy, who convinced the two chieftains to desert the Greeks and rejoign William with the bulk of their men. This defection caused Byzantine morale to plummet. Constantine, feigning illness, decided to raise the siege, and departed the Morea for Constantinople, leaving the megas domestikos Alexios Philes and the parakoimomenos John Makrenos in command.

== Battle and aftermath ==
Philes now took his army and marched towards Messenia, where he occupied the pass of Makryplagi, situated near Gardiki Castle, at the borders of Messenia with the central Peloponnese. William, reinforced by the experienced Turkish contingent and now possessing a superior army, had marched to Messenia to defend the fertile province. The Achaean army now attacked the Byzantines, despite the fact that they held strong positions on the high ground. The first two attacks were beaten off, but the third attack, with the Turk as main composition, led by William's commander Anselin de Toucy, broke the Byzantines, who fled in panic.

The Byzantine rout was complete, and the generals Philes, Makrenos, and Alexios Kaballarios, along with many Greek nobles, were captured. The prisoners were brought to William at Veligosti; there a noteworthy conversation took place between the Achaean prince and Philes, which illustrates the respective positions of Latins and Byzantine Greeks: when William exclaimed that this defeat was God's punishment on Palaiologos for violating his oaths, Philes retorted that "the Morea belongs to the Empire of Romania and is the proper heritage of the Emperor. It is instead you who have broken your oaths to the lord."

William then marched south towards the Byzantine stronghold of Mystras. He failed to take the fort, but repopulated and fortified the old city of Sparta, pillaged the surrounding province, and then withdrew to Nikli. Despite his successes in averting a rapid Byzantine conquest of his principality, however, William had exhausted his realm's resources: the constant fighting had devastated and depopulated the country. The conflict degenerated into skirmishes on both sides before being suspended entirely. Negotiations were undertaken, in which Michael VIII proposed to wed his son and heir, Andronikos II Palaiologos (r. 1282–1328) to William's daughter and heiress, Isabella. The proposal foundered at the opposition of the Achaean barons. In the years after, William sought the aid and protection of the powerful Charles of Anjou, whose vassal he became by the Treaty of Viterbo. Faced with the threat of Charles, Byzantine attention was diverted elsewhere, and William managed to avert a repeat of the large-scale Byzantine offensive against him. A prolonged period of relative tranquility followed, but internal squabbles would enable the Byzantines to resume their gradual recovery of the peninsula by the early 14th century.

== Sources ==
- Bartusis, Mark C. (1997). The Late Byzantine Army: Arms and Society, 1204–1453. Philadelphia, Pennsylvania: University of Pennsylvania Press. ISBN 0-8122-1620-2.
- Geanakoplos, Deno John (1959). Emperor Michael Palaeologus and the West, 1258–1282: A Study in Byzantine-Latin Relations. Cambridge, Massachusetts: Harvard University Press.
- Longnon, Jean (1969) [1962]. "The Frankish States in Greece, 1204–1311". In Setton, Kenneth M.; Wolff, Robert Lee; Hazard, Harry W. (eds.). A History of the Crusades, Volume II: The Later Crusades, 1189–1311. Vol. 2 (Second ed.). Madison, Milwaukee, and London: University of Wisconsin Press. pp. 234–275. ISBN 0-299-04844-6.
- Nicol, Donald M. (1993) [1972]. The Last Centuries of Byzantium, 1261–1453 (Second ed.). Cambridge: Cambridge University Press. ISBN 978-0-521-43991-6.
