= Perceval Doria =

Genoese naval and military leader

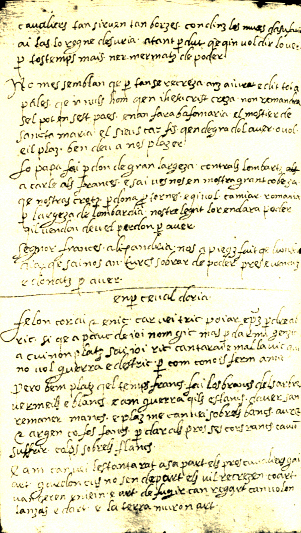
Felon cor ai et enic by "Enperceval doria" is written in cursive on the bottom half of this manuscript page.

Perceval Doria (born c. 1195, died 1264) was a Genoese naval and military leader in the thirteenth century. A Ghibelline, he was a partisan of the Hohenstaufen in Italy and served the Emperor Frederick II and Manfred of Sicily as vicar of Romagna, the March of Ancona, and the Duchy of Spoleto.

He was probably a member of the famous Doria family, whose name was originally D'Oria or da Otranto. Between 1228 and 1243 he assumed the character of a podestà in several Provençal and north Italian cities, such as Arles, Avignon, Asti, and Parma. In 1255 Manfred nominated him to the vicariate general of Ancona and in 1258 that of Romagna. With relations between Manfred and Pope Urban IV deteriorating, Doria was forced to put Spoleto to fire and the sword in 1259. Five years later, in 1264, he led a small army of Saracens and Germans against Charles of Anjou, who contested Manfred's throne. On the ensuing march he drowned in the river Nera di Narco near Arrone with his horse.

Doria was also a troubadour of the Sicilian School, composing two cansos in Provençal as well as two poems in Italian. In one poem, entitled Felon cor ai et enic (1258/9), he praised Manfred's bravery and magnanimity. His other Provençal poem was a tenso, Per aquest cors, del teu trip, with Felip de Valenza.

== Sources ==
- Bertoni, Giulio. I Trovatori d'Italia: Biografie, testi, tradizioni, note. Rome: Società Multigrafica Editrice Somu, 1967 [1915].
- Riquer, Martín de. Los trovadores: historia literaria y textos. 3 vol. Barcelona: Planeta, 1975.
- Siberry, Elizabeth. Criticism of Crusading, 1095–1274. Oxford: Clarendon Press, 1985. ISBN 0-19-821953-9.
- Zeitschrift für romanische Philologie, Band VII, Seiten 221-223, Professor an der Universität Strassburg Dr. Gustav Gröber, Max Pfister, Verlag Max Niemeyer, Halle 1883. LCCN 10-32861 (in German)
