= Nichiin =

- 日印

Personal life
- Born: 1264
- Died: 1329 (aged 64–65)

Religious life
- Religion: Buddhism
- School: Nichiren Buddhism
- Sect: Nichiren-shū; Hokkeshū Jinmon Ryū

Senior posting
- Teacher: Nichirō
- Students: Nichijin

Nichiin (日印, 1264 – January 20, 1329) was one of Nichirō's nine senior disciples (not to be confused with the six senior disciples of Nichiren). Along with his own disciple Nichijin (日陣) he is considered the founder of the Hokkeshū Jinmon Ryū subsect of Nichiren Buddhism.

He was born in Teradomari in Echigo. He became a Tendai priest at the age of 8 and was sent to Kyoto at 16. He famously won a debate against Pure Land Buddhists in 1319, and announced the Jinmon Ryū sect on October 12, 1321.
