= Transiturus =

Name of a papal bull

Coat of Arms of Pope Urban IV

Transiturus de hoc mundo is the papal bull issued on 11 August 1264 by Pope Urban IV in which the feast of Corpus Christi (festum corporis) was declared throughout the entire Latin Church. This was the first papally sanctioned universal feast in the history of the Latin Church.

Thomas Aquinas contributed substantially to the bull, mostly in parts concerned with the liturgical text of the new feast. Thomas composed the sequence Tantum ergo sacramentum for this purpose. The successors of Urban IV did not uphold the decree, and the feast was suspended until 1311, when it was reintroduced by Clement V at the Council of Vienne.

Translated text of Transiturus de Hoc Mundo:

Urban Bishop, servant of the servants of God, to the venerable brother patriarchs, archbishops, bishops and other prelates, health and apostolic blessing.

Christ, our savior, about to depart from this world to ascend to the Father, shortly before his Passion, at the Last Supper, instituted, in memory of his death, the supreme and magnificent sacrament of His Body and Blood, giving us the Body as food and the Blood as drink.

Whenever we eat this bread and drink from this chalice, we announce the death of the Lord, because he told the apostles during the institution of this sacrament: "Do this in memory of me", so that this exalted and venerable sacrament would be for us the main and most distinguished memory of the great love with which He loved us. An admirable and stupendous memory, sweet and soft, expensive and precious, in which prodigies and marvels are renewed; in it are found all the delights and the most delicate flavors, the same sweetness of the Lord is tasted in it and, above all, strength is obtained for life and for our salvation.

It is a sweet, sacrosanct and salutary memorial in which we renew our gratitude for our redemption, we distance ourselves from evil, we establish ourselves in goodness and progress in the acquisition of virtues and grace, we comfort ourselves by the bodily presence of ourselves. Savior, because in this Sacramental commemoration of Christ He is present in our midst, with a different form, but in his true substance.

For before going up to heaven he said to the apostles and their successors: "Look, I am with you always, until the end of the world", and he consoled them with the benign promise that he would also remain with them with his bodily presence.

A monument truly worthy of not being forgotten, with which we remember that death has been defeated, that our ruin has been destroyed by the death of the One who is life itself, that a tree full of life has been grafted onto a tree of death to produce fruits of salvation!

It is a glorious memorial that fills the souls of the faithful with joy, instills joy and brings tears of devotion. We are filled with joy when we think of the Passion of the Lord, by which we have been saved, but we cannot contain our tears. Faced with this sacrosanct memory, we feel moans of joy and emotion sprout in us, joyful in tears full of love, moved by devout joy; our pain is tempered by joy; our joy is mixed with tears and our hearts are overflowing with joy, breaking down in tears.

Infinite greatness of divine love, immense and divine mercy, copious celestial outpouring! God gave us everything at the moment that he subdued at our feet and entrusted to us the supreme dominion of all the creatures of the earth. It ennobles and sublimates the dignity of men through the ministry of the most select spirits. For all of them have been destined to exercise the ministry at the service of those who have received the inheritance of salvation,

And having been so vast the magnificence of the Lord towards us, wanting to show us even more his infinite love, in an outpouring he offered himself and surpassing the greatest generosity and every measure of charity, he gave himself as supernatural food.

Singular and admirable liberality, in which the giver comes to our house, and the gift and the giver are the same thing! Truly, the one who gives himself is endlessly generous, and his affectionate disposition increases in such a way that it, distributed in a great quantity of gifts, redounds at last and returns to the giver, all the greater the more extensively it has spread.

Therefore, the Savior has been given as food; he wanted that, in the same way that man was buried in ruin by forbidden food, he would come back to life for blessed food; man fell for the fruit of a tree of death, rises for a bread of life. From that tree hung a mortal food, in this one finds a food of life; that fruit brought evil, this one healing; a wicked appetite did evil, and a different hunger begets benefit; medicine arrived where the disease had invaded; Where death came from, life came.

Of that first food it was said: "On the day you eat of it you will die"; of the second it has been written: "Whoever eats this bread will live forever."

It is a food that truly restores and nourishes, satisfies to the highest degree not the body, but the heart; not the flesh, but the spirit; not the viscera, but the soul. Man was in need of spiritual nourishment, and the merciful Savior provided, with pious attention, the nourishment of the soul with the best and noblest delicacy.

Generous liberality rose to the height of necessity and charity was equaled to convenience, so that the Word of God, who is delicacy and food for rational creatures, made flesh, gave himself as food to the same creatures, that is, to the flesh and body of man. Man, then, eats the bread of the angels of which the Savior said: "My flesh is true delicacy and my blood is true drink." This delicacy is taken, but not consumed, it is eaten, but it is not modified, since it is not transformed into the person who eats it, but if it is received with dignity, it makes the person who consumes it similar to Him. Exalted and venerable sacrament, kind! and adored, you are worthy of being celebrated, exalted with the most moving praises, for the inspired songs, for the most intimate fibers of the soul, for the most devoted gifts,

Glorious memorial, you should be kept between the deepest heartbeats, indelibly imprinted on the soul, locked in the intimacies of the spirit, honored with the most assiduous and devoted piety!

Let us always go to such a great sacrament to remember at all times the One of whom it should have been the perfect memory, and it was (we know it). Well, we remember more that person whose house and gifts we constantly contemplate.

Although this sacred sacrament is celebrated every day in the solemn rite of mass, nevertheless we believe it useful and worthy that a more solemn feast be celebrated at least once a year, especially to confuse and refute the hostility of the heretics.

For on Holy Thursday, the day on which Christ instituted it, the universal Church, engaged in the confession of the faithful, in the blessing of the chrism, in the fulfillment of the mandate of the washing of the feet and in many other sacred ceremonies, cannot attend fully to the celebration of this great sacrament.

In the same way that the Church attends to the Saints, who are venerated throughout the year, and although their memory is renewed frequently in litanies, masses and other functions, nevertheless it remembers their birth at certain times. days, with more solemnity and with special functions. And since in these festivals perhaps the faithful omit some of their duties due to negligence or worldly occupations, or also due to human frailty, Holy Mother Church establishes a certain day for the commemoration of all the Saints, supplying in this common feast what it has been neglected in particular.

Especially, then, it is necessary to fulfill this duty with the admirable sacrament of the Body and Blood of Christ, which is glory and crown of all the Saints, so that it shines on a special festivity and solemnity and so that what may have been neglected in other Mass celebrations, as far as solemnity is concerned, is supplied with devout diligence; and so that the faithful, as this festivity approaches, entering within themselves, thinking about the past with attention, humility of spirit and purity of conscience, make up for what they have defectively accomplished by attending mass, perhaps occupied with thoughts of business mundane or more ordinarily because of human negligence and weakness. On a certain occasion we also heard it said, when we performed a more modest trade, that God had revealed to some Catholics that it was necessary to celebrate this feast in the whole Church; We, therefore, have believed it opportune to establish it so that, in a dignified and reasonable manner, the Catholic faith may be vitalized and exalted.

That each year, then, a special and solemn feast of such a great sacrament be celebrated, in addition to the daily commemoration that the Church makes of it, and we establish a fixed day for it, the first Thursday after the eighth of Pentecost. We also establish that on the same day devout crowds of faithful gather for this purpose in churches, with generosity of affection, and all the clergy and people, joyful, sing songs of praise, that lips and hearts be filled with holy happiness; sing faith, tremble hope, exult charity; throb devotion, exult purity; let hearts be sincere; that all unite with diligent spirit and prompt will, taking care of preparing and celebrating this party. And may heaven fervor inflame the souls of all the faithful in the service of Christ,

For this reason we recommend and exhort you in the Lord and by means of this Apostolic Bull we order you, by virtue of Holy Obedience, with rigorous precept, imposing it as remission of your sins, that you devoutly and solemnly celebrate this feast so sublime and glorious and endeavor with all attention to have it celebrated in all the churches of your cities and dioceses on the aforementioned Thursday of each year, with the new lessons, responsories, verses, antiphons, psalms, hymns and prayers proper to it, which we include in our Bull together with the proper parts of the mass; We also order you to exhort your faithful with healthy recommendations directly or through others on the Sunday that precedes the aforementioned Thursday so that with a true and pure confession, with generous alms,

And, wanting to encourage the faithful with spiritual gifts to celebrate such a great festival with dignity, we grant to all those who truly repent and confess to participate in the matins of this festival, in the church where it is celebrated, one hundred days of indulgence; many others for the mass, and, likewise, to those who participate in the first vespers of this same party and in the second; and to all those who participate in the office of First, Third, Sixth, None and Compline, forty days for each hour. Finally, to all those who during the Octave attend Matins and Vespers, Mass and the recitation of the Office, we grant one hundred days of indulgence for each day, trusting in the mercy of Almighty God and in the authority of His Holy Apostles Peter and Paul.

Given at Orvieto on August 11, 1264, the third year of our pontificate.
