= Wang Qinghui =

- Born: 1264; China
- Died: 1288 (aged 23–24); China
- Occupations: Concubine; Poet
- Spouse: Emperor Duzong of Song
- Writing career
- Pen name: Wang Zhaoyi
- Period: Song dynasty

Wang Qinghui (Chinese: 王清惠; 1264–1288) was a concubine of Emperor Duzong of the Chinese Song dynasty, who was also a skilled composer of poems and lyrics. After the invasion of Lin'an by the newly proclaimed Yuan Empire in 1276, she was taken north to the Yuan capital of Dadu. She composed her lyric to the tune of Manjianghong during the humiliating journey north. She also instructed the child emperor Gongdi in Confucian classics and Poetry.

While in the north she developed a friendship with her former court companion Wang Yuanliang. During this time she went by the nickname Wang Zhaoyi (王昭儀) (English: The Brilliant Companion). Yuanliang was released after twelve years, after which Wang Qinghui followed him south and adopted Daoism.
