= Michael Kantakouzenos (died 1264) =

Michael Kantakouzenos (died 1264) was megas konostaulos of the Byzantine Empire under Emperor Michael VIII Palaiologos.

According to Pachymeres, this Michael Kantakouzenos was amongst the officers under the command of John Palaiologos the Emperor Michael sent in 1263 to campaign against Michael II, Despot of Epirus. After this campaign, Michael Kantakouzenos was created megas konostaulos or "Grand Constable".

The Chronicle of the Morea mentions a Kantakouzenos, of unknown first name, who was kephale or governor of the Byzantine province in the Peloponnese in 1262. This Kantakouzenos relayed reports of the aggression of William II of Villehardouin, which led to Michael VIII sending an army to the Peloponnese against William. He was renowned as a soldier, and his death at the beginning of the Battle of Makryplagi had a demoralizing effect on the Byzantine side, which led to their defeat. Donald Nicol notes that "it is tempting to identify this unnamed Kantakouzenos of the Peloponnese with the Michael Kantakouzenos" sent against Michael II of Epirus, but he admits that there are difficulties. Nevertheless, this identity is often assumed in earlier works.

This Michael may also be the grandfather of John VI Kantakouzenos, based on the Aragonese version of the Chronicle of the Morea. Nicol observes, "The father of the future Emperor John VI is known to have been himself Byzantine governor of the Peloponnese."

== Sources ==
- Geanakoplos, Deno John (1959). Emperor Michael Palaeologus and the West, 1258–1282: A Study in Byzantine-Latin Relations. Cambridge, Massachusetts: Harvard University Press. OCLC 1011763434.
- Longnon, Jean (1969). "The Frankish States in Greece, 1204–1311". In Wolff, Robert Lee; Hazard, Harry W. (eds.). A History of the Crusades, Volume II: The Later Crusades, 1189–1311. University of Wisconsin Press. pp. 234–275.
- Nicol, Donald (1968). The Byzantine family of Kantakouzenos (Cantacuzenus) ca. 1100-1460: A Genealogical and Prosopographical Study. Dumbarton Oaks studies 11. Washington, DC: Dumbarton Oaks Center for Byzantine Studies. OCLC 390843.
