= Soka Gakkai International =

International Nichiren Buddhist movement

- 創価学会インターナショナル
- Official logo

- Soka Gakkai International flag
- Abbreviation: SGI
- Formation: January 26, 1975
- Headquarters: Tokyo, Japan
- Affiliations: Soka Gakkai
- Revenue: donations and investments
- Website: sokaglobal.org

Soka Gakkai International (SGI) is an international Nichiren Buddhist organization founded in 1975 by Daisaku Ikeda, as an umbrella organization of Soka Gakkai.

It is run by two vice-presidents, including Hiromasa Ikeda, son of the founder. It claims 12 million adherents, but scholars claim the number is overestimated. Recent scholarship estimates Soka Gakkai believers around 2.5 million people in Japan.

== History ==
The Soka Gakkai International (SGI) was formed at a conference on January 26, 1975, on the island of Guam. Representatives from 51 countries attended the meeting and chose Daisaku Ikeda, who served as third president of the Japanese Buddhist organization Soka Gakkai, to become the SGI's founding president. Its founding meeting in Guam is a symbolic gesture referencing Guam's history as the site of some of World War II's bloodiest battles, and proximity to Tinian Island, launching place of the atomic bombs dropped on Hiroshima and Nagasaki, Japan.

The Soka Gakkai's initial global expansion began after World War II, when some Soka Gakkai members married mostly American servicemen and moved away from Japan. Expansion efforts gained a further boost in 1960 when Ikeda succeeded Jōsei Toda as president of the Soka Gakkai. In the first year of his presidency, Ikeda visited the United States, Canada, and Brazil, and the Soka Gakkai's first American headquarters officially opened in Los Angeles in 1963.

In May 2015, the SGI-USA was one of the organizing groups for the first-ever Buddhist conference at the White House.

In June 2015, the SGI-Italy was recognized by the Italian government with a special accord under Italian Constitution Article 8, acknowledging it as an official religion of Italy and eligible to receive direct taxpayer funding for its religious and social activities. It also recognizes the Soka Gakkai as a "Concordat" (It: "Intesa") that grants the religions status in "a special 'club' of denominations consulted by the government in certain occasions, allowed to appoint chaplains in the army – a concordat is not needed for appointing chaplains in hospitals and jails – and, perhaps more importantly, to be partially financed by taxpayers' money." Twelve other religious denominations share this status.

== Organization ==
National SGI organizations operate autonomously and all affairs are conducted in the local language. Many national organizations are coordinated by groups such as a women's group, a men's group, and young women's and young men's groups. National organizations generally raise their own operational funds, although the SGI headquarters in Tokyo has awarded funding grants to smaller national organizations for projects such as land acquisition and the construction of new buildings. SGI-affiliated organizations outside Japan are forbidden to engage directly in politics.

The Soka Gakkai International comprises a global network of affiliated organizations. As of 2011, the SGI reported active national organizations in 192 countries and territories with a total of approximately 12 million members. The SGI is independent of the Soka Gakkai (the domestic Japanese organization), although both are headquartered in Tokyo.

== Demographics ==
The Soka Gakkai International comprises a global network of affiliated organizations. As of 2011, the SGI reported active national organizations in 192 countries and territories with a total of approximately 12 million members. The SGI is independent of the Soka Gakkai (the domestic Japanese organization), although both are headquartered in Tokyo. Recent scholarship estimates Soka Gakkai believers around 2.5 million people in Japan.

The Soka Gakkai International is notable among Buddhist organizations for the racial and ethnic diversity of its members. Susumu Shimazono, Professor Emeritus of religious studies at the University of Tokyo and now Professor at Sophia University, suggested several reasons for this : "One of the common characteristics of the New Religions is their response to strongly felt needs of individuals in their daily lives, their solutions to discord in interpersonal relations, their practical teaching that offers concrete solutions for carrying on a stable social life, and their provision, to individuals who have been cut off from traditional communities".

Peter Clarke wrote that the SGI appeals to non-Japanese in part because "no one is obliged to abandon their native culture or nationality in order to fully participate in the spiritual and cultural life of the movement."

== Initiatives promoting peace, culture and education ==
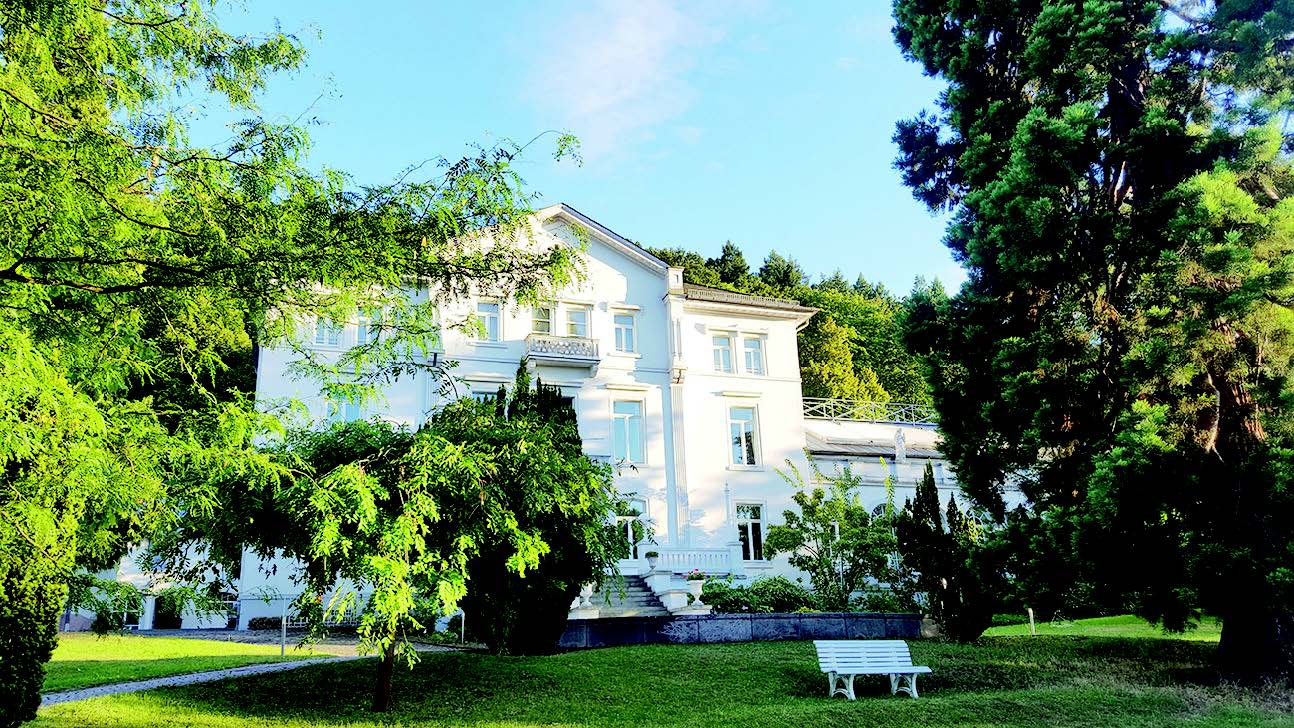
Villa Sachsen SGI center in Bingen am Rhein, Germany

The SGI defines itself as a "movement for contributing to peace, culture and education" based on its "interpretation and practical application of the ideas in the Lotus Sutra."

SGI is affiliated with the United Nations in policy discussions on issues including human rights, sustainable development and peace building is similarly described, in the phrasing of its Charter, as contributing to peace, culture and education.

SGI's social and cultural projects appear to be part of a strategy, according to some scholars and critics of Soka Gakkai, which "uses the image and practice of an NGO (to respond) to its own necessity: the recruitment and maintenance of membership" and "tries to create the image of an institution engaged in activities to promote peace, culture and education based on Buddhism, clearly following the tendencies of national politics", according to scholar Suzana Ramos Coutinho Bornholdt in Japanese Buddhism and Social Action: the case of Soka Gakkai.

=== Environmental awareness ===
The SGI also promotes environmental initiatives through educational activities such as exhibitions, lectures and conferences, and more direct activities such as tree planting projects and the SGI's Amazon Ecological Conservation Center, which is administered by SGI-Brazil. The center is engaged in reforestation, the creation of a regional seed bank, and experiments in sustainable agroforestry.

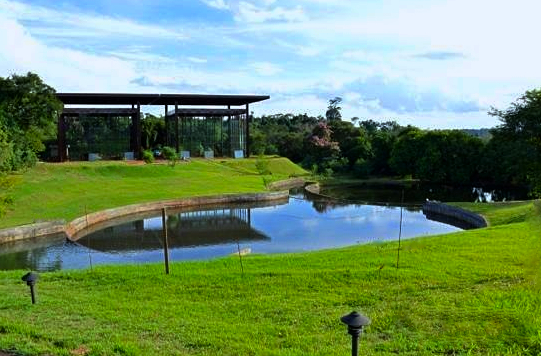
Reflecting pool at the Ikeda Ecological Park in Londrina, Brazil, named in honor of SGI President Daisaku Ikeda

In India, the Bharat Soka Gakkai (the SGI of India) debuted the traveling exhibit "Seeds of Hope," a joint initiative of the SGI and Earth Charter International. At the exhibit's opening in Panaji, the state capital of Goa, regional planning head Edgar Ribeiro spoke of lagging efforts to implement environmental laws and stated that "Only a people's movement can take sustainability forward."

=== Aid work ===
The SGI conducts humanitarian aid projects in disaster-stricken regions. After the 2011 earthquake and tsunami in Japan, local Soka Gakkai facilities became refugee shelters and distribution centers for relief supplies. Efforts also included worldwide fundraising for the victims, youth groups, and spiritual support. In 2014, SGI-Chile members collected supplies to deliver to emergency services and refugee centers after that country's devastating Iquique earthquake.

=== Cultural activities ===
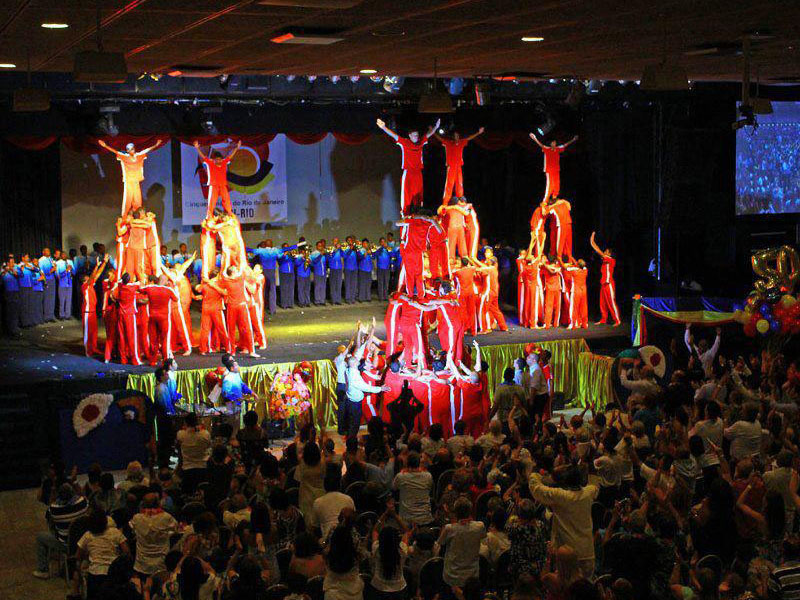
Gymnastic formation by the Brazil SGI team at Rio de Janeiro, on October 30, 2011. Performance art is one of Soka Gakkai's peace activities.

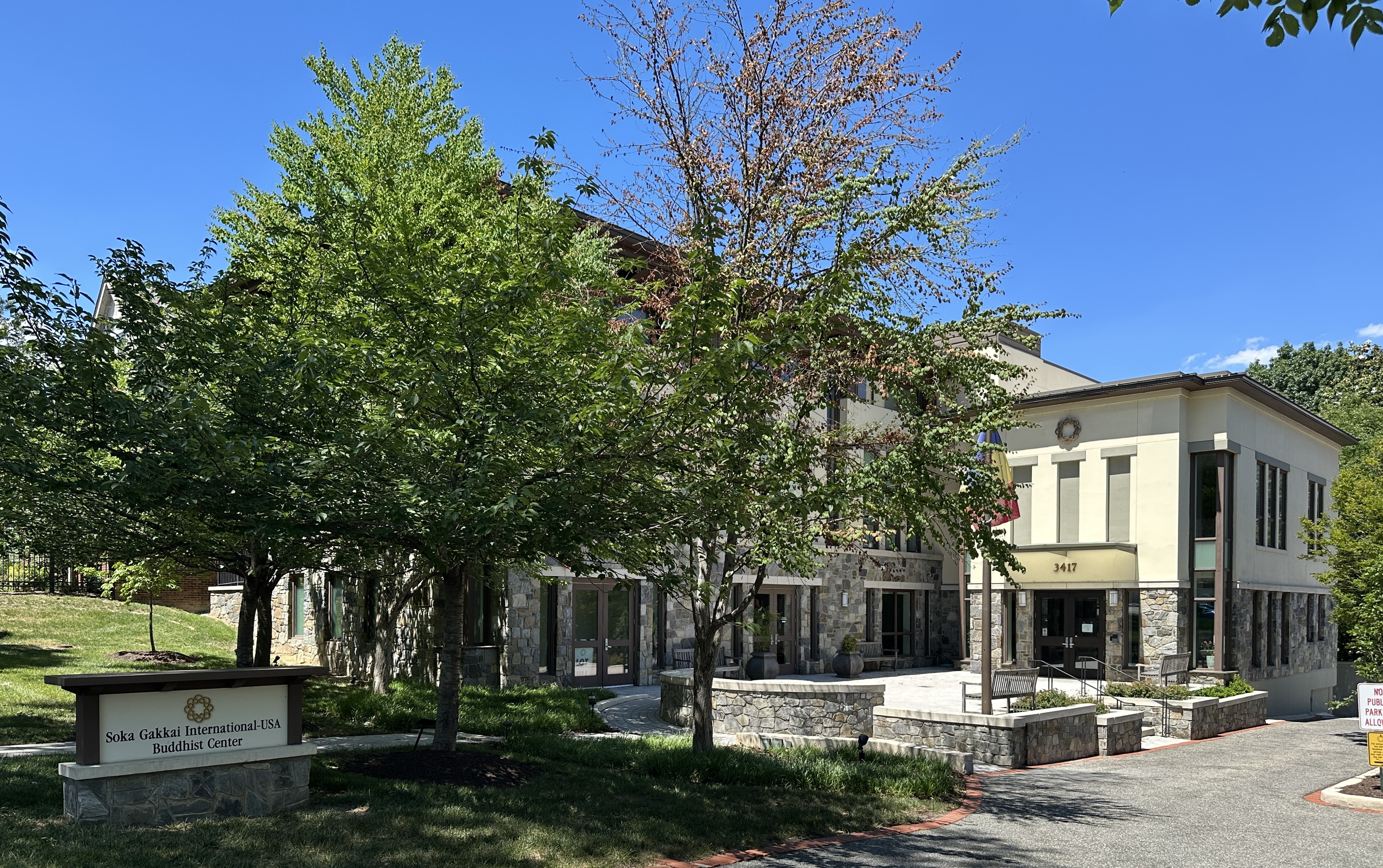
SGI-USA DC Buddhist Cultural Center in Washington, D.C.

==== Cultural institutions ====
The Min-On Concert Association is a subsidiary of the Soka Gakkai established in 1963. It claims to sponsor over 1100 concerts each year.

Daisaku Ikeda also founded the Tokyo Fuji Art Museum in 1983. It houses collections of western and oriental art, and has participated in exchanges with museums around the world.

==== Performance art ====
Soka Gakkai considers dance and other genres of performance art to be a major aspect of its peace activities. It has a long tradition of "culture festivals", originating in the 1950s, which take the form of group gymnastics, marching bands, traditional ensembles, orchestras, ballet, or choral presentations.

=== Educational activities ===
The educational activities of the Soka Gakkai are often subsumed under the title of Soka education.

== Notable members of the Soka Gakkai International ==
- Adewale Akinnuoye-Agbaje – British-Nigerian actor best known for his roles on television, like Lost, Oz, and Game of Thrones
- Angelica Ross - American first transgender actress to be cast in a Broadway leading role and founder of the TransTech Social Enterprises, also known from TV series Pose and American Horror Story
- Anne Louise Hassing – Danish actress, best known from her roles in movies such as The Idiots and The Hunt
- Belinda Carlisle – American singer, member of the Rock and Roll Hall of Fame best known as the lead singer of The Go-Go's
- Betty Faria - Brazilian actress, best known for the lead role in the soap opera Tieta
- Beverly Glenn-Copeland – U.S.-born Canadian musician, songwriter and singer
- Buster Williams – American jazz bassist
- Carmen Consoli – Italian singer and songwriter who sold two million albums in Italy
- Celeste Lecesne – American actor and writer of the Oscar-winning film Trevor, co-founder of The Trevor Project
- Cheryl Boone Isaacs – American film executive, 1st African-American president of the Academy of Motion Picture Arts and Sciences
- Christine Rankin – Former head of the New Zealand Ministry of Social Development and politician
- Claire Bertschinger – British nurse whose work inspired the formation of Live Aid and Band Aid and was named a dame by Queen Elizabeth II for "serving to Nurse and to International Humanitarian Aid"
- Claudia Jessie – British actress, best known from the TV series Bridgerton
- Courtney Love – American musician, songwriter, actress, and artist, she is known as the lead singer from Hole and for her roles in movies like The People vs. Larry Flynt and Man on the Moon, and was also nominated for four Grammy Awards and a Golden Globe
- David Bennett Cohen – blues musician
- Duncan Sheik – American Grammy Awards nominated singer-songwriter and composer
- Hank Johnson – United States Congressman for Georgia's 4th congressional district
- Hayley Mills – English actress, best known for performances in movies such as Tiger Bay and Pollyanna, who received a Disney Legends Award and won a BAFTA and a Golden Globe
- Herbie Hancock – American jazz pianist, keyboardist, bandleader, and composer who won 14 Grammy Awards and an Oscar
- Hisashi Iwakuma – Major League Baseball player, pitcher for the Seattle Mariners
- Howard Jones – English musician, singer and songwriter who had top ten 40 hit singles in the United Kingdom
- Isabela Garcia - Brazilian actress known for her work on television soap operas, she was called "the Brazilian Shirley Temple" on her youth.
- John Astin – American actor best known for playing Gomez Addams on The Addams Family
- Letícia Colin - Brazilian actress, nominated for the International Emmy Award for Best Actress for her role in the series Onde Está Meu Coração
- Marcia Wallace - American actress, voice artist and comedian, who won an Emmy Awards for The Simpsons
- Mariane Pearl – French freelance journalist and former columnist and reporter, also known from the memoir A Mighty Heart
- Orlando Bloom – British actor and UNICEF Goodwill Ambassador known for his roles in film, including Pirates of the Caribbean trilogy, The Lord of the Rings trilogy, and Troy
- Orlando Cepeda – American former Major League Baseball first baseman and member of the Hall of Fame
- Patrick Duffy – American actor best known for his roles on television, including Dallas and Step by Step
- Roberto Baggio – Italian footballer and member of the FIFA World Cup Dream Team
- Ron Glass - American actor best known for his roles as literary Det. Ron Harris in the television sitcom Barney Miller (1975–1982)
- Sabina Guzzanti – Italian satirist, actress, and writer
- Shan Serafin – American film director, screenwriter and novelist
- Shunsuke Nakamura – Japanese soccer player, midfielder for the Scottish team Celtic F.C.
- Sophia Mendonça – Brazilian author who focuses on the experience of being autistic and trans and how that affects communication and sociality between individuals and groups.
- Steven Sater – American playwright, lyricist and screenwriter best known for the Tony-winning musical Spring Awakening
- Suzanne Vega – American folk singer-songwriter
- Tina Turner – American singer, dancer, actress, and author, who sold over 100 million records worldwide and received 12 Grammy Awards
- Vinessa Shaw – American actress, best known from her roles in films such as Hocus Pocus and Side Effects
- Wayne Shorter – American jazz saxophonist and composer, who won 11 Grammy Awards
