= Daisaku Ikeda =

Japanese religious leader (1928–2023)

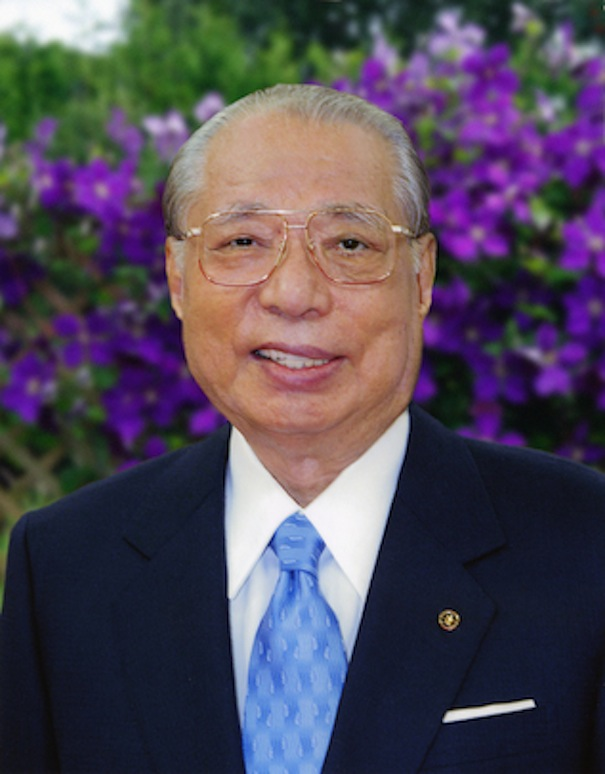
- Ikeda in 2010

Honorary President of Soka Gakkai
- In office 24 April 1979 – 15 November 2023

President of Soka Gakkai International
- In office 26 January 1975 – 15 November 2023

3rd President of Soka Gakkai
- In office 3 May 1960 – 24 April 1979
- Preceded by: Jōsei Toda
- Succeeded by: Hiroshi Hōjō

Personal details
- Born: 2 January 1928 Ōta, Tokyo, Japan
- Died: 15 November 2023 (aged 95) Shinjuku, Tokyo, Japan
- Spouse: Kaneko Ikeda
- Children: 3 (1 deceased)
- Parents: Ichi Ikeda (mother); Nenokichi Ikeda (father)
- Education: Fuji Junior College (present-day Tokyo Fuji University)
- Website: daisakuikeda.org

Daisaku Ikeda (池田 大作, Ikeda Daisaku; 2 January 1928 – 15 November 2023) was a Japanese Buddhist leader, author, educator and nuclear disarmament advocate. He served as the third president and then honorary president of the Soka Gakkai, which is considered among the largest of Japan's new religious movements, but has also been described as a cult by medias ("Soka Gakkai has many of the markings of a cult") and politicians (the French parliamentary commission in 1995).

Ikeda was the founding president of the Soka Gakkai International. Although a claimed Japanese membership of 8.27 million households, recent research and surveys suggest that between 2.5 million and 4 million people - approximately two to three percent of the Japanese population - are active members of Soka Gakkai, and the organization claims to have approximately 11 million practitioners in 192 countries and territories, more than 1.5 million of whom reside outside of Japan as of 2012.

Ikeda was the founder of a variety of educational and cultural institutions including Soka University, Soka University of America, Min-On Concert Association and Tokyo Fuji Art Museum. In Japan, he was also known for his international outreach to China.

== Early life and background ==
Ikeda Daisaku was born in Ōmori, Ōta, Tokyo, Japan, on 2 January 1928. Ikeda had four older brothers, two younger brothers, and a younger sister. His parents later adopted two more children, for a total of 10 children. Since the mid-nineteenth century, the Ikeda family had successfully farmed nori, edible seaweed, in Tokyo Bay. By the turn of the twentieth century, the Ikeda family business was the largest producer of nori in Tokyo. The devastation of the 1923 Great Kantō earthquake left the family's enterprise in ruins. Ikeda's eldest brother, Kiichi, died in the Imphal Campaign in Burma in January 1945 during the last stages of World War II. Ikeda suffered from tuberculosis in his younger days, a time dedicated to avid reading of books and poems from Japan and throughout the world.

In August 1947, at the age of 19, Ikeda was invited by an old friend to attend a Buddhist discussion meeting. It was there that he met Josei Toda, the second president of Japan's Soka Gakkai Buddhist organization. Ikeda began practicing Nichiren Buddhism and joined the Soka Gakkai. He regarded Toda as his spiritual mentor and became a charter member of the group's youth division.

== Career ==
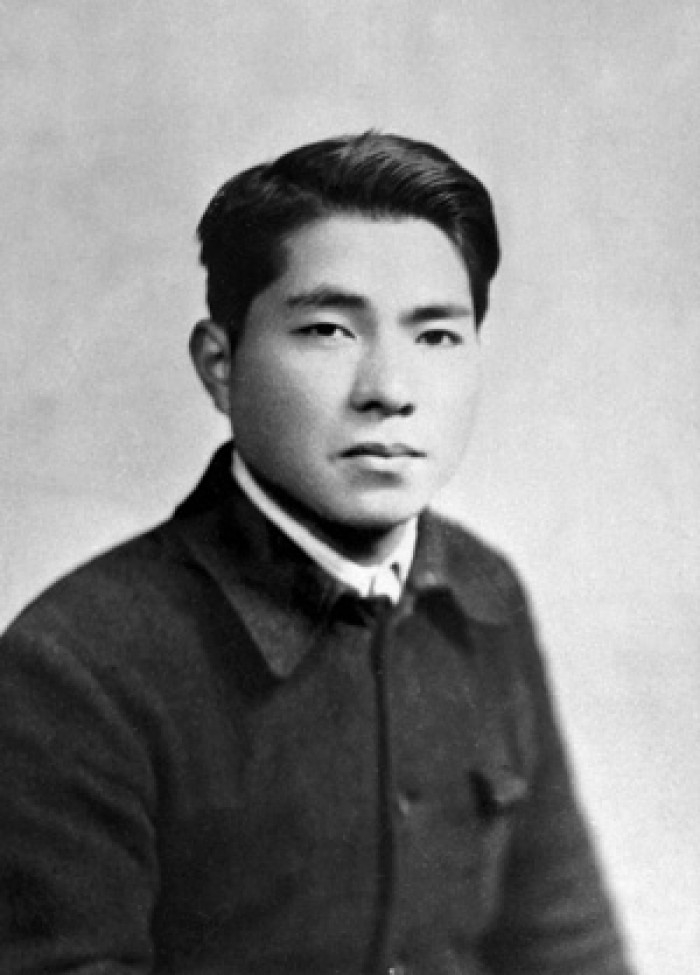
Daisaku Ikeda, age 19

Shortly after the end of World War II, in January 1946, Ikeda gained employment with the Shobundo Printing Company in Tokyo. In March 1948, Ikeda graduated from Toyo Trade School and the following month entered the night school extension of Taisei Gakuin (present-day Tokyo Fuji University) where he majored in political science. During this time, he worked as an editor of the children's magazine Shonen Nihon (Boy's Life Japan), which was published by one of Josei Toda's companies.

In 1953, at the age of 25, Ikeda was appointed as one of the Soka Gakkai's youth leaders. The following year, he was appointed as director of the Soka Gakkai's public relations bureau, and later became its chief of staff.

In 1957, a group of Young Men's Division members campaigning for a Soka Gakkai candidate in an Osaka Upper House by-election were arrested for distributing money, cigarettes, and caramels at supporters' residences, in violation of election law, and on July 3 of that year, at the beginning of an event memorialized as the "Osaka Incident,". Ikeda was arrested in Osaka. He was taken into custody in his capacity as Soka Gakkai's Youth Division Chief of Staff for overseeing activities that constituted violations of election law. He spent two weeks in jail and appeared in court forty-eight times before he was cleared of all charges in January 1962.

=== Soka Gakkai presidency ===
In May 1960, two years after Toda's death, Ikeda, then 32 years old, succeeded him as president of the Soka Gakkai. Later that year, Ikeda began to travel overseas to build connections between Soka Gakkai members living abroad and expand the movement globally.

As a president, Ikeda continued fusing the ideas and principles of educational pragmatism with the elements of Buddhist doctrine. He reformed many of the organization's practices, including the aggressive conversion style known as shakubuku, for which the group had been criticized in Japan and in other countries. The organization "had provoked public opprobrium because of its aggressive recruitment policies and its strongly developed political base."

In 1979, Ikeda resigned as president of the Soka Gakkai (in Japan), in compliance with the demands of the Nichiren Shōshū priesthood . Hiroshi Hōjō succeeded Ikeda as Soka Gakkai president, and Ikeda was made honorary president.

Ikeda continued to be revered as the Soka Gakkai's spiritual leader, according to Asian studies associate professor Daniel Métraux. Métraux in 1994 wrote that "adulation of Ikeda in the Gakkai press gives some non-member readers the impression that the Gakkai is little more than an Ikeda personality cult". One reason for the excommunication of Soka Gakkai by Nichiren Shōshū in 1991 was, according to the "Nichiren Shoshu" entry in The Princeton Dictionary of Buddhism, "Nichiren Shōshū accusing Sōka Gakkai of forming a personality cult around their leader Ikeda" and "Soka Gakkai accusing the Nichiren Shoshu leader Abe Nikken of trying to dominate both organizations." Sociologist of religion Peter Beyer in 2006 summarizes an understanding in the context of contemporary global society: "Until the 1990s, Soka Gakkai still was related formally to the monastic organization, Nichiren Shoshu, but conflicts over authority led to their separation (Métraux 1994)."

=== Soka Gakkai International founding ===
By the 1970s, Ikeda's leadership had expanded the Soka Gakkai into an international lay Buddhist movement increasingly active in peace, cultural, and educational activities. On 26 January 1975, Soka Gakkai representatives from 51 countries created the Soka Gakkai International. Ikeda took a leading role in the global organization's development and became the founding president of the Soka Gakkai International.

== Critics and controversies ==
=== Reputation ===
Ikeda has elicited a variety of assessments from scholars and journalists. According to Asian studies professor Daniel Métraux in 1994, Ikeda is "possibly one of the more controversial figures in Japan's modern history".

In 1996, the Los Angeles Times described Ikeda as "the most powerful man in Japan – and certainly one of the most enigmatic", "condemned and praised as a devil and an angel, [...] a despot and a democrat".

In 1984, Polly Toynbee, granddaughter of British historian Arnold Toynbee, whose conversations with Ikeda were published, was invited by Ikeda to meet him in Japan. Following her visit, she wrote a critical article for The Guardian on meeting the leader. She writes:

"On the long flight to Japan, I read for the first time my grandfather's posthumously, published book, "Choose Life -- A Dialogue".. . . My grandfather [...] was 85 when the dialogue was recorded, a short time before his final incapacitating stroke (...) My grandfather never met Ikeda on his visits to Japan. His old Japanese friends were clearly less than delighted with Ikeda's grandiose appropriation of his memories. Several days passed before we were to meet our mysterious host, time in which we learned more about Mr Ikeda and his Soka Gakkai movement. One thing above all others was made clear: this was an organisation of immense wealth, power and political influence (...) Asked to hazard a guess at his occupation, few would have selected him as a religious figure. I have met many powerful men—prime ministers, leaders of all kinds—but I have never in my life met anyone who exuded such an aura of absolute power as Mr Ikeda".

=== Religion and politics ===
In the history of institutional relations between the religious movement Soka Gakkai and the political party Kōmeitō founded in 1964 by Ikeda as an outgrowth from Soka Gakkai, he has faced "unabated criticism against the alleged violation of the separation of religion and state" and been accused of "far-reaching political ambitions." Associate professor of government George Ehrhardt and co-authors write that "Sōka Gakkai's entrance into the political arena [...] permanently transformed the relationship between religion and politics in Japan by dividing those who opposed the creation of a religious political party from those who accepted it."

In 2015, addressing the "party's understudied history," political scientist Steven Reed and his co-authors write that "the image of Kōmeitō as a mere political branch of Sōka Gakkai is clearly mistaken" and that "the separation between party and religious group announced by Ikeda Daisaku in 1970 made a real difference." He also states that "sōka gakkai meetings are used to introduce Kōmeitō candidates and to advertise the party, particularly during the period leading up the election."

About "the changing role of the Komeito in Japanese politics in the 1990s", Daniel Métraux - an academic with a strong link to the SGI - states that: "While it is difficult to determine his exact role, an examination of his daily itinerary would reveal that he would have very little time personally for political management and that most of the aging leader's time is devoted to religious affairs, traveling, and writing. Ikeda may well have influenced the Komeito in a macrosense, but in a microsense he is clearly not involved. The Komeito and its successes have a life of their own; they are certainly not lifeless puppets ready to react to Ikeda's or to the Soka Gakkai's every whim."

A lot of newspapers and scholars have proven though that, despite the formal separation, there are still "strong links" and that the Komeito has remained to some extent the "political arm" of Soka Gakkai.

=== Censorship ===
In 1970, there was a freedom of speech controversy about the intent to prevent the publication of Hirotatsu Fujiwara's polemical book, I denounce Soka Gakkai, that vehemently criticized Ikeda, Soka Gakkai and the Komeito. In his 3 May 1970 speech, addressing, among others, Soka Gakkai members, guests and news media, Ikeda responded to the controversy by: apologizing to the nation "for the trouble...the incident caused," affirming the Soka Gakkai's commitment to free speech and religious freedom, announcing a new policy of formal separation between the Soka Gakkai religious movement and Komeito, calling for both moderation in religious conversion practices and democratizing reforms in the Soka Gakkai, and envisioning a Buddhist-inspired humanism.

In October 1982, Ikeda had to appear in court concerning three cases.

== Philosophy and beliefs ==
Ikeda's relationship with his mentor, Jōsei Toda, and influence of Tsunesaburō Makiguchi's educational philosophy, shaped his emphasis on dialogue and education as fundamental to building trust between people and peace in society. He interprets the Middle Way as a path between idealism and materialism.

Ikeda's use of the term ōbutsu myōgō in his 1964 book Seiji shūkyō (Politics and Religion) has been interpreted to mean "politics by people, with mercy and altruism as a Buddhist philosophy, different from the union of politics and religion (seikyo icchi)." The term is also used by Ikeda in the Komeito's founding statement. In the 1969 edition of Seiji shūkyō, "he declared that obutsu myogo would not be an act of Soka Gakkai imposing its will on the Japanese state to install Nichiren Shoshu Buddhism as the national creed," and that "Soka Gakkai, through Komeito, would instead guide Japan to a new, democratic world order, a 'Buddhist democracy' (buppo minshu shugi) combining the Dharma with the best of the Euro-American philosophical tradition to focus on social welfare and humanistic socialism." Another interpretation of his views at that time was that "Buddhist democracy" could be achieved by a "religious revolution" through kōsen-rufu on the premise of achieving "social prosperity in accordance with individual happiness" for the entire society. In 1970, after Ikeda announced the severing of official ties between the Soka Gakkai and Komeito, the use of "politically charged terms such as obutsu myogo" was eliminated.

Ikeda refers in several writings to the Nine Consciousness as an important conception for self-transformation, identifying the ninth one, "amala-vijñāna", with the Buddha-nature. According to him, the "transformation of the karma of one individual" can lead to the transformation of the entire society and humankind.

== Accomplishments ==
=== Institutional engagement ===
Ikeda founded a number of institutions to promote education, cultural exchange and the exchange of ideas on peacebuilding through dialogue. They include: Soka University in Tokyo, Japan, and Soka University of America in Aliso Viejo, California; the Victor Hugo House of Literature, in France; the International Committee of Artists for Peace in the United States; the Min-On Concert Association in Japan...

From 1990, Ikeda partnered with Rabbi Abraham Cooper and the Simon Wiesenthal Center to address anti-Semitic stereotypes in Japan.

=== Peace proposals ===
Since 26 January 1983, Ikeda had submitted annual peace proposals to the United Nations, addressing such areas as building a culture of peace, gender equality in education, empowerment of women, youth empowerment and activism for peace, UN reform and universal human rights with a view on global civilization.

=== Citizen diplomacy ===
Ikeda has described his travels, meetings and dialogues as citizen diplomacy. Researchers linked to Ikeda and the Soka Gakkai have suggested the body of literature chronicling Ikeda's diplomatic efforts and his international dialogues provide readers with a personalized global education and model of citizen diplomacy.

First in 1967 then several times in 1970, Ikeda met with Austrian-Japanese politician and philosopher Richard von Coudenhove-Kalergi, founder of the Paneuropean Movement. Their discussions which focused on east–west relations and the future of peace work were serialized in the Sankei Shimbun newspaper in 1971. In 1974, Ikeda conducted a dialogue with French novelist and then former Minister of Cultural Affairs Andre Malraux.

In January 1975, Ikeda met with Henry Kissinger, then United States Secretary of State, to "urge the de-escalation of nuclear tensions between the United States and the Soviet Union." The same month Ikeda met with Secretary-General of the United Nations Kurt Waldheim. Ikeda presented Waldheim with a petition containing the signatures of 10,000,000 people calling for total nuclear abolition. The petition was organized by youth groups of the Soka Gakkai International and was inspired by Ikeda's longtime anti-nuclear efforts.

Ikeda's meetings with Nelson Mandela in the 1990s led to a series of Soka Gakkai International-sponsored anti-apartheid lectures, a traveling exhibit, and multiple student exchange programs at the university level. Their October 1990 meeting in Tokyo led to collaboration with the African National Congress and the United Nations Apartheid Center on an anti-apartheid exhibit inaugurated in Yokohama, Japan "on the 15th anniversary of the Soweto uprisings (16 June 1976)."

=== Sino-Japanese relations ===
Ikeda made several visits to China and met with Chinese Premier Zhou Enlai in 1974, though Sino-Japanese tensions remained over the brutalities of war waged by the Japanese militarists. The visits led to the establishment of cultural exchanges, and opened academic exchanges between Chinese educational institutions and Soka University. Chinese media describe Ikeda as an early proponent of normalizing diplomatic relations between China and Japan in the 1970s, citing his 1968 proposal that drew condemnation by some and the interest of others including Zhou Enlai. It was said that Zhou Enlai entrusted Ikeda with ensuring that "Sino-Japanese friendship would continue for generations to come."

== Personal life ==
Ikeda lived in Tokyo with his wife, Kaneko Ikeda (née Kaneko Shiraki), whom he married on 3 May 1952. The couple had three sons, Hiromasa, Shirohisa (died 1984), and Takahiro.

Hiromasa Ikeda is the executive vice-president of the Soka Gakkai International and trustee of the Soka University in Japan.

Takahiro Ikeda is director of the Soka School System, the educational corporation of the Sôka Gakkai.

Daisaku Ikeda died on 15 November 2023, at the age of 95. His death was publicly announced on 18 November.

== Books ==
=== Dialogue with Toynbee ===
The 1976 publication of Choose Life: A Dialogue (in Japanese, Nijusseiki e no taiga) is the published record of dialogues and correspondences that began in 1971 between Ikeda and British historian Arnold J. Toynbee about the "convergence of East and West" on contemporary as well as perennial topics ranging from the human condition to the role of religion and the future of human civilization. As of 2012, the book had been translated and published in twenty-six languages.

But Toynbee being "paid well" for the interviews with Ikeda raised criticism : "he accepted the dialogue with the controversial Ikeda primarily for the money", according to historian Louis Turner. To an expat's letter critical of Toynbee's association with Ikeda and Soka Gakkai, Toynbee wrote back: "I agree with Soka Gakkai on religion as the most important thing in human life, and on opposition to militarism and war."

=== Main books ===
Ikeda's most well-known publication is the novel The Human Revolution, which is an autobiography in 30 volumes, but with great freedoms in relation to the facts.

In their 1984 book Before It Is Too Late, Ikeda and Aurelio Peccei discuss the human link in the ecological consequences of industrialization, calling for a reform in understanding human agency to effect harmonious relationships both between humans and with nature.

In Life—An Enigma, a Precious Jewel (1982), Unlocking the Mysteries of Birth and Death (1984), discussions of a Buddhist ontology offer an alternative to anthropocentric and biocentric approaches to wildlife conservation.

The sixteen conversations between Lou Marinoff and Ikeda in their book The Inner Philosopher (2012) introduce classic Eastern and Western philosophers.

=== Column in the Japan Times ===
In 2003, Japan's largest English-language newspaper, The Japan Times, began carrying Ikeda's contributed commentaries on global issues. By 2015, The Japan Times had published 26 of them.

But the column raised criticism among the Japan Times' journalists, who protested their disagreement with Ikeda's writing in 2006.

=== Selected works by Ikeda ===
- Choose Life: A Dialogue with Arnold J. Toynbee, Richard L. Gage (Editor), (1976), Oxford University Press, ISBN 978-0-19-215258-9; London and New York: I. B. Tauris, Reprint edition, 2008; ISBN 978-1-84511-595-1
- On Peace, Life and Philosophy with Henry Kissinger (tentative translation from Japanese), Heiwa to jinsei to tetsugaku o kataru,「平和」と「人生」と「哲学」を語る, Tokyo, Japan: Ushio Shuppansha, 1987; ISBN 978-4-267-01164-1
- Humanity at the Crossroads: An Intercultural Dialogue with Karan Singh, New Delhi: Oxford University Press India, 1988; ISBN 978-0-19-562215-7
- Dawn After Dark with René Huyghe, (1991), Weatherhill, ISBN 978-0-8348-0238-4; London and New York: I. B. Tauris, Reprint edition, 2008; ISBN 978-1-84511-596-8
- The New Human Revolution (an ongoing series) (30+ Volumes, this is an ongoing series), Santa Monica, California: World Tribune Press, 1995–;
- Dialogue of World Citizens with Norman Cousins, (tentative translation from Japanese), Sekai shimin no taiwa, 世界市民の対話, Paperback edition, Tokyo, Japan: Seikyo Shimbunsha, 2000; ISBN 978-4-412-01077-2
- Dialogue for a Greater Century of Humanism with John Kenneth Galbraith (in Japanese: 人間主義の大世紀を―わが人生を飾れ) Tokyo, Japan: Ushio Shuppansha, 2005; ISBN 978-4-267-01730-8
- Moral Lessons of the Twentieth Century: Gorbachev and Ikeda on Buddhism and Communism with Mikhail Gorbachev, London and New York: I. B. Tauris, 2005; ISBN 978-1-84511-773-3
- The Human Revolution (The Human Revolution, #1–12), abridged two-book set, Santa Monica, California: World Tribune Press, 2008; ISBN 0-915678-77-2
- A Dialogue Between East and West: Looking to a Human Revolution with Ricardo Díez Hochleitner, Echoes and Reflections: The Selected Works of Daisaku Ikeda series, London and New York: I. B. Tauris, 2008
- The Inner Philosopher: Conversations on Philosophy's Transformative Power with Lou Marinoff, Cambridge, Massachusetts: Dialogue Path Press, 2012; ISBN 978-1-887917-09-4
- America Will Be!: Conversations on Hope, Freedom, and Democracy, with Vincent Harding, Cambridge, Massachusetts: Dialogue Path Press, 2013; ISBN 978-1-887917-10-0

Buddhist titles
Preceded by Jōsei Toda	3rd President of Soka Gakkai; 3 May 1960 – 24 April 1979	Succeeded by Hiroshi Hōjō (北条浩)
