= Toilet meal =

Practice of dining in a toilet room

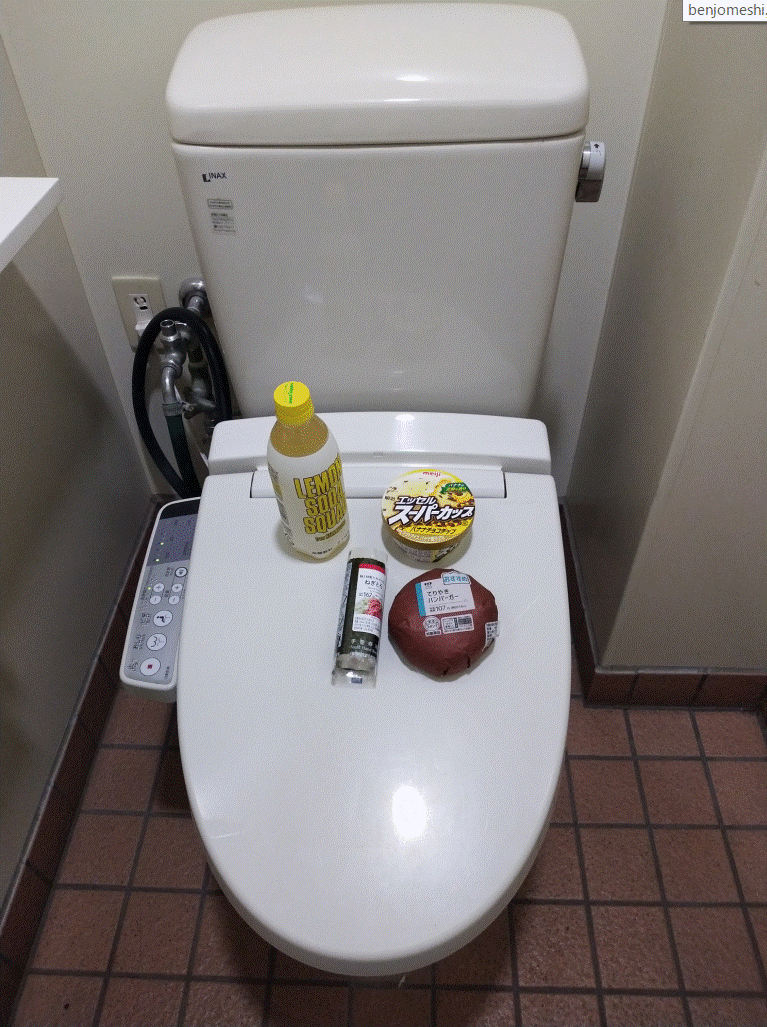
Meal set out to be eaten on a toilet

Toilet meal (便所飯, benjo-meshi) is a Japanese social phenomenon referring to the act of an individual eating a meal in a toilet room. In modern Japan, some people eat alone in a bathroom for various reasons, the most common being that they do not wish to be seen eating alone. Other reasons include saving money from eating out, to hide from co-workers in a busy workplace, or simply because they find it more comfortable.

Since toilet meals are often solitary and clandestine, others are unlikely to be aware of their occurrence. For this reason, "toilet meals" were initially regarded as an urban legend, but subsequent investigations have confirmed the phenomenon as relatively widespread. The term "toilet meal" has even been referenced in various popular media, most notably in various Japanese television shows.

== Typical practice ==
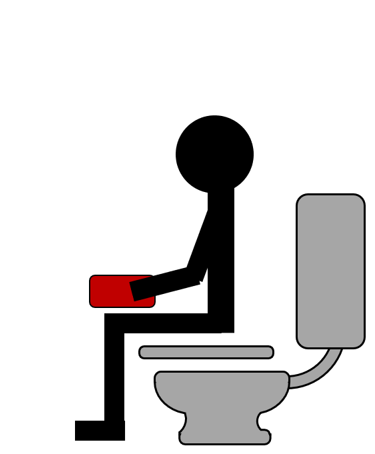
Sitting position

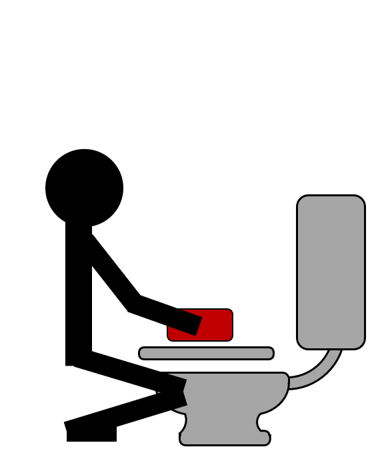
Crouching position

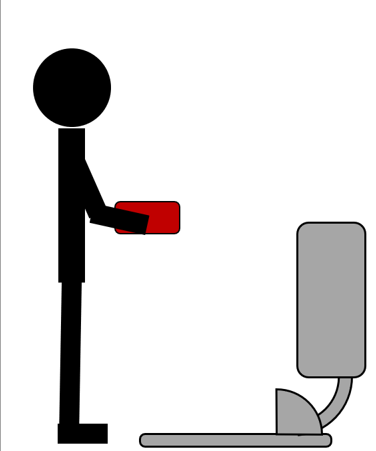
Standing position

Since private lavatory rooms are not designed for eating, eating postures vary from person to person. Typically people sit on the lid of a Western-style toilet-- this is the most natural posture for eating in a lavatory and is shown in most fictional portrayals. Other ways involve crouching in front of the toilet or standing in front of a Japanese-style squat toilet, which is at floor level. Alternatively, the person may crouch or squat in front of the toilet. In the case of a Japanese-style toilet, the food is rested on the knees; the lid of a Western-style toilet can be used as a table. 100 Most Popular Words in Japan says, "If you need to spread out your meal, lower the lid of the toilet bowl to make it look like a table. The disadvantage of this posture, however, is that it is very tiring, and the sight of the toilet seat and water tank can be distracting". This posture occurs in some fictional portrayals; for example, in episode 33 of the manga Zekkai Gakkyu, the main character Ohno eats squatting in a toilet room with a Japanese-style toilet.

== Research ==
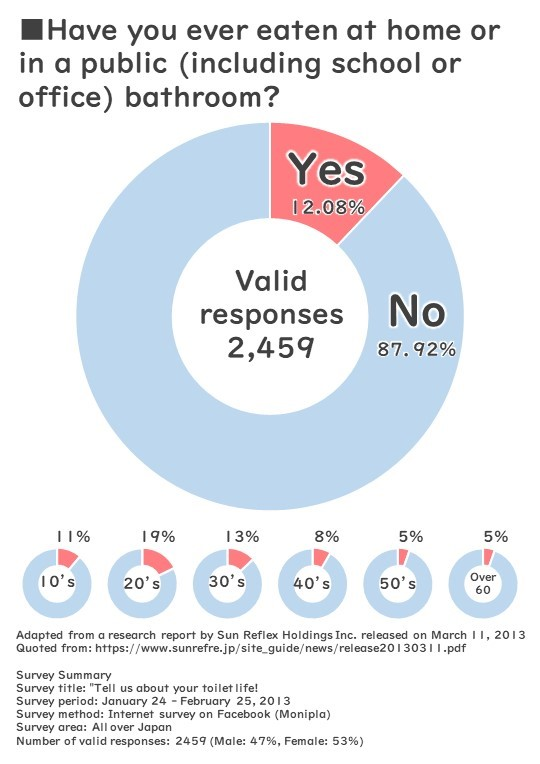
In a 2013 survey, about 12% of respondents said they had had a toilet meal.

Social research has been conducted to find out how many people have eaten a meal on a toilet. Although figures vary depending on the survey, one survey conducted in 2013 found that 12.08% of respondents said they had eaten on the toilet, with a higher percentage of younger people and women.

- In 2009, Naoki Ogi, a professor at Hosei University, surveyed 487 students and received 400 responses. 0.3% of the respondents answered that they ate toilet meals "often" and 2.0% of the respondents answered they ate "a little".
- In a survey of 1,000 people conducted by Mynavi News in 2012, 7.1% said they had eaten meals in the toilet.
- In a survey conducted by home renovation company SunRefreHoldings in 2013, out of 2,459 valid responses, 12% had eaten in a public restroom at home, school, or work. Of these same responses, 19% said they had eaten toilet meals in their 20s, 13% in their 30s, and 11% in their teens. Notably, 80% of women in their twenties stated they had eaten a "toilet meal", many of them in public restrooms.
- In a 2015 nationwide survey of 1,500 Japanese men and women in their 20s to their 60s conducted by the news site Sirabee, 5.5% said they had eaten a toilet meal.
- In a 2017 survey of 1,342 men and women in their 20s to 60s, also conducted by Sirabee, 10.2% said they had eaten in the toilet. 11.9% of men and 8.5% of women surveyed said they had eaten in the toilet. Of the reasons given were wanting to save money on lunch, having trouble refusing invitations, and being "cool and comfortable".

== Law ==
In Japan, there are few laws regarding toilet meals, since they would be difficult to enforce. Some ways that it could pose legal enforcement would be if the occupant stays in the bathroom for a long time and prevents others from using it or leaving garbage and causing sanitary issues, however these have often been attributed to stomach issues, such as diarrhea.

== Hygiene ==
Eating in a toilet is not desirable from a hygiene standpoint. According to the Training Manual for School Meal Preparation Personnel published by the Ministry of Education, Culture, Sports, Science and Technology, "Since various pathogenic microorganisms exist in stool and are excreted with stool during defecation, toilets are places with a high risk of being contaminated by pathogens that cause food poisoning. During defecation, there is a high possibility of the toilet bowl being contaminated by norovirus and other pathogens, and of toilet doorknobs, etc. being contaminated through the hands and fingers". The report devotes pages to lavatories as a place where food handlers need to take special care.

== Fear of being seen as lonely ==
A toilet meal is often seen as embarrassing or a sign of social ineptitude. In Japanese social life, attractiveness is often measured by the number of friends a person has, and those who are seen as friendless are often evaluated negatively on that basis alone. Therefore, people who fear being perceived as friendless and unattractive secretly eat in the toilet. Daisuke Tsuji, an associate professor of sociology at Osaka University, wrote in Asahi Shimbun: "Those who fail to make friends within a limited relationship must continue to endure not only loneliness but also the gaze of being branded as a strange person with no friends. They are marginalized in a double sense. The only place left to escape the gaze is the private room in the bathroom". Tsuji believes that the solution to the problem is to "create an environment in which children and young people can form diverse relationships outside of their peer group, including a review of the class system", and that the problem of the toilet meal can be solved by supplementing multi-layered human relationships.

== University response ==
There is a movement at universities to address the issue of students eating toilet meals from the perspective of interpersonal communication. When the issue was first reported, there was little awareness that it was occurring. In response to inquiries by Asahi Shimbun in 2009, the University of Tokyo's public relations group said, "It may be that we just haven't noticed it, but we have never heard of it", and Meijo University's general policy department responded, "We don't recognize it, so we don't give any guidance".

- In 2013, during an overnight orientation camp for new students, Shimane University's Faculty of Education circulated a questionnaire and found that 56.6% of the students were aware of the phrase "toilet meal". The department tried to reduce new students' problems by holding training sessions to build relationships with upperclassmen.
- In a 2016 Kobe Gakuin University report on a survey of its own campus on "places to stay", 1.7% of students cited the restroom as a place to stay, citing Ninomiya's view that "we need to worry about situations such as 'toilet meal' by college students who eat lunch in the restroom" and, "We cannot deny the possibility that there are students at our university who consider the toilet to be their 'place of residence because they avoid interacting with others or are unable to relate well with others".
- According to a counsellor at the Health Center of Hokkaido University, "There are actually students who eat their meals alone in the private rooms of the toilets", and those students who cannot eat alone because they are worried about being seen, they have an activity called "lunch meeting" where they eat their meals with the staff and talk about various topics.
- The student counselling office of Tokyo Fuji University has reported that students have told them they eat in the toilet and that they advise students to "come to the student counselling office as soon as possible if you are troubled by such a thing".

== See also ==
- Bathroom reading
- Bathroom sex
- Mariko Aoki phenomenon
- Modern Toilet Restaurant
- Shower beer
- Toilets in Japan
