= Bathroom reading =

Act of reading text while in a bathroom

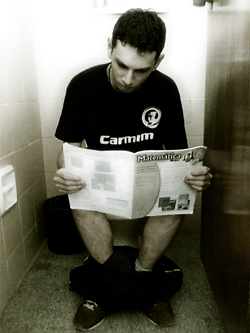
A man engaging in some bathroom reading

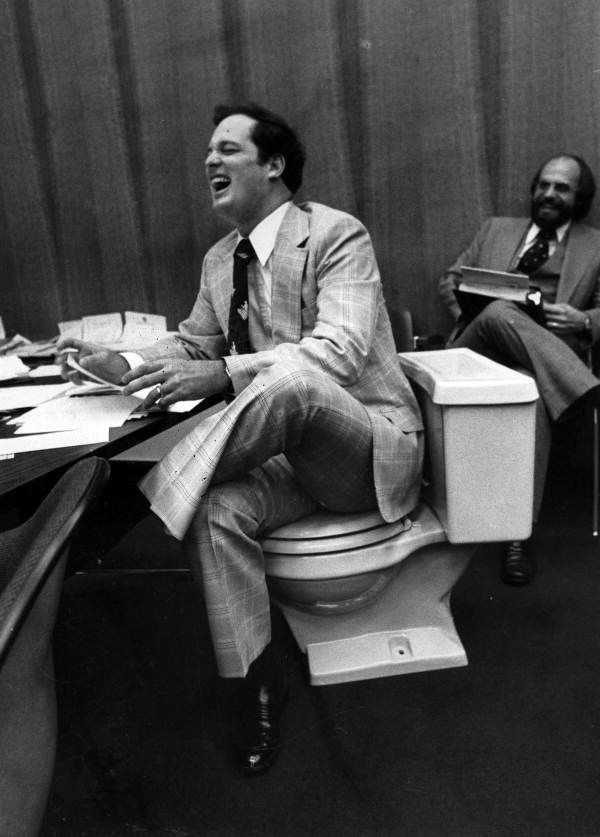
Florida Senator Robert W. McKnight sits on a toilet seat at his desk in the Florida Senate building

Bathroom reading is the act of reading text while in a bathroom, usually while sitting on the toilet and defecating. The practice has been common throughout history and remains widespread today with both printed material and smartphones.

== History ==
Bathroom reading has been commonplace throughout history. Before the invention of modern toilet paper, Americans in the colonial period often used newspaper or similar printed material to wipe themselves, because newsprint paper is fairly soft and absorbent.

Writing in the 18th century, the English statesman Philip Stanhope, 4th Earl of Chesterfield reported that he knew "a gentleman who was so good a manager of his time that he would not even lose that small portion of it which the call of nature obliged him to pass in the necessary-house; but gradually went through all the Latin poets, in those moments.

The advent of the mobile phone is believed to have significantly increased bathroom reading. A 2009 study conducted in Israel found that a majority of adults read from their cell phones on the toilet, and a 2015 study conducted by Verizon found that 90% of cell phone users admitted to reading from their phones while on the toilet.

== Bathroom reading and literature ==
The term "bathroom reading" refers to any literary material deemed suitable for casual or light reading. In 2011, the Canadian author Margaret Atwood wrote:

Bathroom reading is a certain kind of reading—episodic, but encouraging first thing in the morning. The bathroom is a place where you can go in and pretend to be doing one thing while actually you're reading. Nobody can interrupt you. Compendiums of this and that are very useful for bathroom reading: small reading packages within a larger book. You wouldn't want to read War and Peace in there. You'd never come out. They'd probably call the police and get the door broken down.

Pulp magazines were associated with bathroom reading, which the film Pulp Fiction references in repeated scenes of John Travolta's character Vincent Vega reading the pulpy spy novel Modesty Blaise while sat on a toilet. Bathroom reading also refers to a genre of books containing humor and trivia, such as the Uncle John's Bathroom Reader series.

In James Joyce's novel Ulysses, the protagonist Leopold Bloom reads a magazine on the toilet and then wipes himself with it.

== Sanitation, hygiene and health ==
According to a professor at the Columbia University Medical Center, reading in the bathroom can potentially facilitate the spread of disease if airborne bacteria land on reading material and are transmitted to the reader; however, the activity is not a significant health concern as long as the reading environment is sanitary, the reader does not have a compromised immune system, and the reader practices ordinary hygiene.

A University of Arizona microbiologist who researched the topic in 2002 found that bathroom reading at the workplace was not a significant hygiene risk, noting that paper is a relatively unattractive environment for bacteria and that desk areas often have more bacteria than bathrooms because they are cleaned less frequently.

Although time spent on the toilet can increase the incidence of hemorrhoids, a 2009 study found that bathroom readers were not more likely than non-bathroom readers to have hemorrhoids.

== Bathroom reading and psychology ==
Even when people read for extended periods of time during defecation, it is rare for bathroom readers to feel disgusted by the smell of their own feces, or even to consciously notice the smell. Sigmund Freud also noted this phenomenon in Civilization and Its Discontents, though he described lack of awareness of fecal smell in general, not just while reading: "in spite of all man's developmental advances, he scarcely finds the smell of his own excreta repulsive, but only that of other people's."

The psychoanalyst Otto Fenichel believed bathroom reading was an indication of early childhood trauma. He wrote that the activity is "an attempt to preserve the equilibrium of the ego; part of one's bodily substance is being lost and so fresh matter must be absorbed through the eyes." James Strachey, who translated Freud's works into English, similarly noted that the activity of casual reading while defecating was essentially "infantile" behavior.

DiMassimo Brand Advertising once tested political advertising in bathrooms by placing various messages about George W. Bush and Al Gore in New York City public restrooms. The company's study found that 62 percent of people "remembered the exact message" of bathroom ads, compared to 16 percent for billboard advertisements.

== See also ==
- Bathroom sex
- Mariko Aoki phenomenon, in which the smell of bookstores induces an urge to defecate
- Toilet meal
