= Bathroom sex =

Sexual activity taking place in a bathroom or toilet area

Bathroom sex is the engagement of sexual activities in the bathroom or toilet, either private or public. Bathroom sex occurs in many parts of the world and in many places, including stores, hotels, bars, restaurants, airplanes, and universities. Bathroom sex is depicted in many films. There is specific jargon which is applied to initiating and having sex in a bathroom, as well as the sex positions that are most commonly used.

According to anthropologist Helen Fisher, when a person is in the bathtub with another person, they have removed their "defenses". Therefore, every touch during this time becomes a lot more intimate.

== Prevalence ==
In Japan, love hotels are sometimes built with specially designed bathrooms to facilitate bathroom sex. According to Mark D. West, people in these hotels often engage in bathroom sex "with the tap on". Clinical sexologist Sonia Borg states that in the United States, bathroom sex in public bathrooms is more frequent in bars than in other places, such as restaurants. In 2006, the Daily News reported that many couples have sex in the restaurant bathrooms across New York City. Bathroom sex also occurs in the lavatory of passenger airliners. People who have sex in the aircraft lavatory are said to have joined the Mile High Club.

Bathroom sex is also observed in the military. According to Gay Men in Modern Southern Literature by William Mark Poteet, some members of the military have gay sex in bathrooms to break the military moral code or, as he describes it, "the heterosexual masculine fortress of pure and decent sex."

=== Gay sex in bathrooms ===
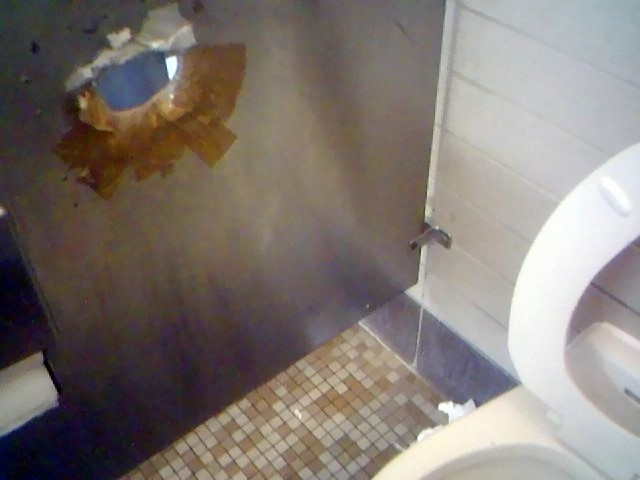
A glory hole is visible in the wall (left) in this toilet in California.

During the 1980s, when homosexuality was still viewed negatively in American society, many gay men found bathroom sex an easy way to have sex. Journalist Michael Koretzky wrote in The Independent Florida Alligator, "[B]athroom sex is one of the most discreet ways for gay men to meet other gay men." A variety of sex acts occurred in those bathrooms. There have been reports of holes drilled in toilet stall walls of some American universities to facilitate bathroom sex. Men would use these so-called "glory holes" to have sex with other men.

Gay sex was common in the bathrooms of the University of Florida in the 1980s. In its 26 January, 1989 issue, Alligator published photos of holes drilled in stall walls of bathrooms there. There were two types of holes — large and small. Through the larger holes, also called "glory holes", voyeurs were able to watch others masturbating in the adjacent stall. The larger hole enabled men to insert their penises through it for sex. Through the smaller holes, men were able to voyeuristically watch each other or transfer notes for dating. Sometimes the stall walls had large gaps between their lowest level and the floor, enabling men to have sex without a hole. The paper reported men between the ages of 17 and 50 having sex in the university bathrooms.

In Europe and the United States, making a sound by knocking one's foot against the floor is a code for requesting sex in public bathrooms. The initiator knocks his foot under the wall that divides two toilet stalls so that the person in the adjacent stall can see it. If the second person responds by making knocks in a similar fashion, the first person extends his foot farther into the other person's stall. They continue this process until both of them are sure that the signal is really for sex.

== Jargon ==
Specific names are often used to designate the various sex positions used for bathroom sex. In the "toilet rider" position, a man sits on the toilet lid and the passive partner sits over him, facing either backwards or forwards. In the "doggy's sink" position, the passive partner leans over the hand basin, and is penetrated from the rear, giving the active partner a view of the passive partner's front in the mirror. In "Shower sex", the couple have sex under the shower.

The "Bathroom Bliss" position involves one of the partners sitting on the side of the tub while the other partner stands on one leg and puts the other leg over the active partner's shoulder, facilitating oral sex.

There is another sex position called "Man on the ledge", in which the man leans against the bathtub edge with the help of his arms. His body remains straight. With the man fixed in position, the other partner sits on top of him.

== Debate on legality ==
According to the American Civil Liberties Union (ACLU), sex in bathroom stalls is private, so people having sex in such place should have privacy. The Minnesota Supreme Court concluded that people having sex in closed bathroom stalls "have a reasonable expectation of privacy."

== Depiction in literature and media ==
In literature, Edmund White's semi-autobiographical novel The Beautiful Room Is Empty provides a positive portrayal of homosexual sex in a college bathroom.

The 1989 film Urinal analyzes and criticizes the public outing of heterosexual and homosexual men who have sex in bathrooms, by the police. The 1996 film Feeling Minnesota has a scene of bathroom sex involving the actors Cameron Diaz and Keanu Reeves. This scene is described as a "showstopper" by author Michael Ferguson. The 2002 film Unfaithful depicted a bathroom sex scene in the Lower Manhattan bar Cafe Noir in New York City. The 2001 film The Piano Teacher had a scene of bathroom sex involving Isabelle Huppert and Benoît Magimel. In the seventh season of Entourage, Vincent Chase, played by Adrian Grenier, and Sasha Grey end up having sex in the bathroom of a restaurant in the ninth episode. The mile high club is also portrayed in multiple Hollywood films.

In music, the music video of George Michael's 1998 single "Outside" depicts bathroom sex among men in a satirical manner. The Strokes' 2003 album Room on Fire features the song "Meet Me in the Bathroom".

== See also ==
- Bathroom reading
- Larry Craig scandal, in which a U.S. senator's career was ended after he was accused of soliciting sex in a public bathroom
- Mile high club
- Toilet meal
