= Mark DiMassimo =

American marketing and advertising executive

Mark DiMassimo is an American marketing and advertising executive, and a frequent commentator on issues in advertising, branding and their relationship to popular culture. He is the founder and chief executive officer of DiMassimo Goldstein, a marketing, design and advertising agency based in New York City.

== Career ==
DiMassimo founded DiMassimo Goldstein, sometimes called DiGo, in 1996. The agency describes itself as using “behavior change marketing to drive growth in brands and businesses that change lives for the better.”

DiMassimo was previously creative director at the advertising agency Kirshenbaum Bond & Partners, and worked at other agencies, including J. Walter Thompson, Chapman Direct Advertising (a former unit of Young & Rubicam), Deutsch Inc. and BBDO.

In 2015, DiMassimo Goldstein led a rebranding campaign for Weight Watchers, deemphasizing the counting of calories in favor of the company's newly introduced “Freestyle” program, which emphasized healthy foods.

In 1990, at Chapman Direct Advertising, DiMassimo co-led the account for the AT&T Universal Card, a credit card that attracted nearly 19 million customers by promising it would charge users no fees for life.

=== Commentary and media ===
DiMassimo is frequently interviewed as a brand expert by news outlets and industry publications.

In June 2018, he discussed what President Trump's trade disputes with the European Union could mean for Harley-Davidson motorcycles. In 2012 he gave perspective on presidential candidate Newt Gingrich, and the impact that widely publicized claims by his ex-wife about his past behavior would have on his image and chances in that year's Republican primary campaign.

DiMassimo has argued that while advertising can be a powerful driver of behavioral and social change, it is becoming increasingly difficult to create influential campaigns in the digital age, when technology has made it easier for companies and brands come in direct contact with consumers.

== Advertising campaigns ==
Clients of DiMassimo Goldstein have included FreshDirect, New York's Bronx Zoo, Jackson Hewitt, Ally, Proactiv, Memorial Sloan Kettering Cancer Center and TradeStation.

In 2007 DiMassimo and Eric Yaverbaum, a public relations executive, co-founded "Tappening," a social marketing effort to promote the use of tap water and reduce the environmental impact of single-use plastic water bottles. Three years later, DiMassimo and Yaverbaum launched "Offlining," a campaign to encourage people to disengage occasionally from digital distractions.

In 2012 DiMassimo and a team from his agency appeared as themselves on “The Pitch,” a reality television series broadcast for two years on the AMC cable network. The show featured two advertising agencies each week competing for a client's business. On the show, DiMassimo's team won the account of C. Wonder, a women's fashion retailer.

== Writing ==
DiMassimo is a co-author of Inside the Minds: Innovation Unleashed, a book about the creative element in marketing communications. He wrote the foreword for and is profiled in Passion Brands, a book by business strategist Kate Newlin. DiMassimo is the co-author, with Eric Yaverbaum, of an e-book, Digital@Speed, which offers strategies for success as a digital marketer.

== Awards and recognition ==
DiMassimo was named a Future 50 CEO by SmartCEO magazine in 2014, 2015, 2016 and 2017. The campaign DiMassimo led for the Citi AAdvantage card won an Effie Award for effectiveness from the American Marketing Association.
