= Uncle John's Bathroom Reader =

American trivia book series

- Author: The Bathroom Reader's Institute
- Country: United States
- Language: English
- Genre: Trivia
- Publisher: Portable Press
- Published: 1988
- No. of books: 39

Uncle John's Bathroom Reader is an American series of books containing trivia and short essays on miscellaneous topics, ostensibly for reading in the bathroom. The books are credited to the Bathroom Readers' Institute, though Uncle John is a real person named John Javna. Javna created the series with his brother Gordon and a team of assistants.

The books are published by Portable Press, an imprint of Printer's Row Publishing Group. The introductions in the books, as well as brief notes in some articles, provide small pieces of information about Uncle John. The first book was published in 1988, and in 2012, the series reached its 25th release, The Fully Loaded 25th Anniversary Bathroom Reader.

Volumes dedicated to a single topic have been released, under the title Uncle John Plunges Into..., for example: history, presidents, and the universe. There are also books on individual U.S. states, the weather, numbers, quotes, the year 2000, a special book for mothers, cat lovers, dog lovers, horse lovers, love, Uncle John's Book of the Dumb, and several Bathroom Readers for Kids Only!. Though most of the books were written by the Bathroom Readers' Institute, some of the ones that are based around a specific subject are written by a lone author, who is not in the Institute. Additionally, the Institute will often publish articles and other contributions sent in from readers. Recurring articles such as "Flubbed Headlines", "Oops", and "Classifieds" often depend on these contributions. Currently, the institute publishes three books a year; a "classic" reader, and two "plunges into" editions, one for a location such as a U.S. state, and another of a specific topic.

Their volumes contain information on subjects such as quotes, dumb criminals, palindromes, anagrams, urban legends and hoaxes, failed inventions, the history of everyday things, and accidental discoveries, as well as articles on pop culture and 'celebrities' such as Emperor Norton (see Features). Throughout the books, there are what the BRI calls "running feet"—short fun facts on the bottom of each page. A typical example is "An object on Jupiter would weigh 144,000 times more than it would on Pluto."

Uncle John's also publishes Page-a-Day calendars with Workman Publishing Company.

The series has sold 15 million copies.

== History ==
=== 1988–1991 ===
The Bathroom Readers' Institute began in 1988, with the publishing of the original Uncle John's Bathroom Reader, by St. Martin's Press Publishers. After the book's success, Uncle John's 2nd Bathroom Reader was published in 1989, with a third and a fourth book being added to the series in the subsequent years. These earlier books are distinct from the rest not only because of their short length, but because of the writing style: short articles starting with a brief history of the subject, followed by several tidbits on the subject.

=== 1992–1995 ===
After the initial four books, the BRI decided that it would publish further volumes under its own label, and Uncle John's 5th Bathroom Reader was released in October 1992; notable for a revised writing style, more and longer articles, and the introduction of new recurring features, Uncle John's 5th set what would become the standard design for every book going forward. The Fifth, Sixth and Seventh Bathroom Reader went out of print in 1994, and would later be re-released as a single volume, Uncle John's Legendary Lost Bathroom Reader. In 1995, the millionth copy of the series was sold, and to celebrate the milestone, the BRI released an eighth volume, The Best of Uncle John's Bathroom Reader.

=== 1996–2002 ===
In 1996, the Bathroom Readers' Institute revised its writing style yet again, adopting a more 'encyclopedic' style, as well as spreading longer articles throughout the book. In 2000, John Javna retired from the Bathroom Reader series to care for his elderly parents, and the series was run thereafter by his brother Gordon, who had co-created the series with him.

=== 2003–present ===
For the first 15 years, "Bathroom Readers" referred to just one series. Now, there were several competitors (none quite as successful) and quite a few series within the BRI. Books 15–18 began to move away from the format seen in previous books, using two- and three-part articles, and sometimes removing popular recurring features in favor of the longer format. For a time, the Bathroom Reader series was owned by Advanced Marketing Services, a discount books distributor that went bankrupt in 2007, after which it was sold to a new owner with Gordon Javna continuing to steward the series until 2016.

In 2012, Uncle John's Bathroom Reader celebrated its 25th anniversary with the publication of "Fully Loaded 25th Anniversary Bathroom Reader". With the 28th edition of the series, the cover was completely overhauled, with a new flexibound cover instead of the old paper. With the 30th anniversary of the series in 2017, the books were updated to feature a new interior design. The flexibound covers were discontinued with the 35th anniversary in 2022.

Gordon Javna retired from the series in 2016 after the Bathroom Reader offices in Ashland, Oregon were closed. The series continued to be published by Portable Press, and the Javna brothers were described by Bookriot as not being directly involved with the publication of the Bathroom Reader books as of 2022. John Javna has continued to write the introductions for subsequent volumes of the series, and he and Gordon are also listed as contributors to editions such as 2022's Uncle John's Awesome 35th Anniversary Bathroom Reader.

== List of Uncle John's books ==
Uncle John's Classic Editions
| Edition | Title | Year | Notes |
|---|---|---|---|
| 1 | Uncle John's Bathroom Reader | 1988 | |
| 2 | Uncle John's Second Bathroom Reader | 1989 | |
| 3 | Uncle John's Third Bathroom Reader | 1990 | |
| 4 | Uncle John's Fourth Bathroom Reader | 1991 | |
| 5 | Uncle John's Fifth Bathroom Reader | 1992 | |
| 6 | Uncle John's Sixth Bathroom Reader | 1993 | |
| 7 | Uncle John's Seventh Bathroom Reader | 1994 | |
| 8 | Uncle John's Ultimate Bathroom Reader | 1995 | |
| 9 | The Best Of Uncle John's Bathroom Reader | 1996 | |
| 10 | Uncle John's Giant 10th Anniversary Bathroom Reader | 1997 | |
| 11 | Uncle John's Great Big Bathroom Reader | 1998 | |
| 12 | Uncle John's Absolutely Absorbing Bathroom Reader | 1999 | |
| 13 | Uncle John's All-Purpose Extra-Strength Bathroom Reader | 2000 | |
| 14 | Uncle John's Supremely Satisfying Bathroom Reader | 2001 | |
| 15 | Uncle John's Ahh-Inspiring Bathroom Reader | 2002 | |
| 16 | Uncle John's Unstoppable Bathroom Reader | 2003 | |
| 17 | Uncle John's Slightly Irregular Bathroom Reader | 2004 | |
| 18 | Uncle John's Fast-Acting Long-Lasting Bathroom Reader | 2005 | |
| 19 | Uncle John's Curiously Compelling Bathroom Reader | 2006 | |
| 20 | Uncle John's Triumphant 20th Anniversary Bathroom Reader | 2007 | |
| 21 | Uncle John's Unsinkable Bathroom Reader | 2008 | |
| 22 | Uncle John's Endlessly Engrossing Bathroom Reader | 2009 | |
| 23 | Uncle John's Heavy Duty Bathroom Reader | 2010 | |
| 24 | Uncle John's 24-Karat Gold Bathroom Reader | 2011 | |
| 25 | Uncle John's Fully Loaded 25th Anniversary Bathroom Reader | 2012 | |
| 26 | Uncle John's Perpetually Pleasing Bathroom Reader | 2013 | |
| 27 | Uncle John's Canoramic Bathroom Reader | 2014 | |
| 28 | Uncle John's Factastic 28th Bathroom Reader | 2015 | |
| 29 | Uncle John's Uncanny Bathroom Reader | 2016 | |
| 30 | Uncle John's Old Faithful 30th Anniversary Bathroom Reader | 2017 | |
| 31 | Uncle John's Actual and Factual Bathroom Reader | 2018 | |
| 32 | Uncle John's Truth, Trivia, and the Pursuit of Factiness Bathroom Reader | 2019 | |
| 33 | Uncle John's Greatest Know on Earth Bathroom Reader | 2020 | |
| 34 | Uncle John's Hindsight Is 20/20 Bathroom Reader | 2021 | |
| 35 | Uncle John's Awesome 35th Anniversary Bathroom Reader | 2022 | |
| 36 | Uncle John's Weird, Wonderful World Bathroom Reader | 2023 | |
| 37 | Uncle John's Action-Packed Bathroom Reader | 2024 | |
| 38 | Uncle John's Know It All Bathroom Reader | 2025 | |
| 39 | Uncle John's All-Knowing Bathroom Reader | 2026 | |

== List of omnibuses ==
Uncle John's Omnibus Editions
| Edition | Title | Year | Notes |
|---|---|---|---|
| 1 | The Best of Uncle John's Bathroom Reader | 1995 | Contains selected material from the first seven Bathroom Reader books. |
| 2 | Uncle John's 4-Ply Bathroom Reader | 2008 | Uncle John's First Bathroom Reader, Uncle John's Second Bathroom Reader, Uncle John's Third Bathroom Reader, Uncle John's Fourth Bathroom Reader |
| 3 | Uncle John's Legendary Lost Bathroom Reader | 1999 | Uncle John's Fifth Bathroom Reader, Uncle John's Sixth Bathroom Reader, Uncle John's Seventh Bathroom Reader |
| 4 | Uncle John's Biggest Ever Bathroom Reader | 2002 | Uncle John's Ultimate Bathroom Reader, Uncle John's Great Big Bathroom Reader |
| 5 | Uncle John's Gigantic Bathroom Reader | 2006 | Uncle John's Giant 10th Anniversary Bathroom Reader, Uncle John's Absolutely Absorbing Bathroom Reader |
| 6 | Uncle John's Monumental Bathroom Reader | 2007 | Uncle John's Supremely Satisfying Bathroom Reader, Uncle John's All-Purpose Extra-Strength Bathroom Reader |
| 7 | The Best Of The Best Of Uncle John's Bathroom Reader | 2008 | Contains material from Uncle John's Ultimate Bathroom Reader (1996), Uncle John's Giant 10th Anniversary Bathroom Reader (1997), Uncle John's Great Big Bathroom Reader (1998), Uncle John's Absolutely Absorbing Bathroom Reader (1999), Uncle John's All-Purpose Extra Strength Bathroom Reader (2000), Uncle John's Supremely Satisfying Bathroom Reader (2001), Uncle John's Bathroom Reader Plunges Into History (2001), Uncle John's Ahh-Inspiring Bathroom Reader (2002), Uncle John's Bathroom Reader Plunges Into the Universe (2002), Uncle John's Unstoppable Bathroom Reader (2003), Uncle John's Bathroom Reader Plunges Into Great Lives (2003), Uncle John's Colossal Collection of Quotable Quotes (2004), Uncle John's Slightly Irregular Bathroom Reader (2004), Uncle John's Bathroom Reader Plunges Into the Presidency (2004), Uncle John's Presents Mom's Bathtub Reader (2004), Uncle John's Fast-Acting Long-Lasting Bathroom Reader (2005), Uncle John's Bathroom Reader Tees Off on Golf (2005), Uncle John's Bathroom Reader Plunges Into Hollywood (2005), Uncle John's Curiously Compelling Bathroom Reader (2006), Uncle John's Bathroom Reader Wonderful World of Odd (2006), Uncle John's Tales to Inspire (2006), Uncle John's Bathroom Reader Extraordinary Book of Facts (2006), Uncle John's Quintessential Collection of Notable Quotables for Every Conceivable Occasion (2006), Uncle John's Bathroom Reader Plunges Into Music (2007), Uncle John's Bathroom Reader Plunges Into National Parks (2007), Uncle John's Bathroom Reader Takes a Swing at Baseball (2008), and Uncle John's Triumphant 20th Anniversary Bathroom Reader (2007). |
| 8 | Uncle John's Extra Large Bathroom Reader | 2016 | Uncle John's Unstoppable Bathroom Reader, Uncle John's Ahh-Inspiring Bathroom Reader |

== Plunges Into... ==
Besides the annual editions and omnibuses, many topic specific editions were also published. These editions focused on such things like individual U.S. states, history, national parks, Hollywood, television, the U.S. Armed Forces, the environment, etc. These have ceased publishing since 2013.

- Uncle John's Plunges into History 2001 (ISBN 978-1-57145-697-7)
- Uncle John's Plunges into National Parks, First Printing 2007
- Uncle John's Plunges into Great Lives, First Printing
- Uncle John's Plunges into Canada
- Uncle John's Plunges into the Universe
- Uncle John's Plunges into New Jersey
- Uncle John's Plunges into Minnesota (ISBN 978-1-59223-380-9)
- Uncle John's Plunges into California (ISBN 978-1-60710-426-1)
- Uncle John's Plunges into Texas (ISBN 978-1-60710-779-8)
- Uncle John's Plunges into New York (ISBN 978-1-60710-235-9)

== Other titles ==
- Uncle John's Bathroom Reader Shoots and Scores
- Uncle John's Bathroom Reader Shoots and Scores, Updated & Expanded
- Uncle John Takes a Swing at Baseball
- Uncle John's Strange & Scary Bathroom Reader for Kids Only
- Uncle John's Book of the Dumb
- Uncle John's Quintessential Collection of Quotable Non Quotables
- Uncle John's Briefs: Quick Bits of Fascinating Facts and Amazing Trivia
- Uncle John's New & Improved Briefs: Fast Facts, Terse Trivia & Astute Articles
- Uncle John's Extraordinary Book of Facts
