= Modern Toilet Restaurant =

Toilet-themed restaurant chain in Taiwan

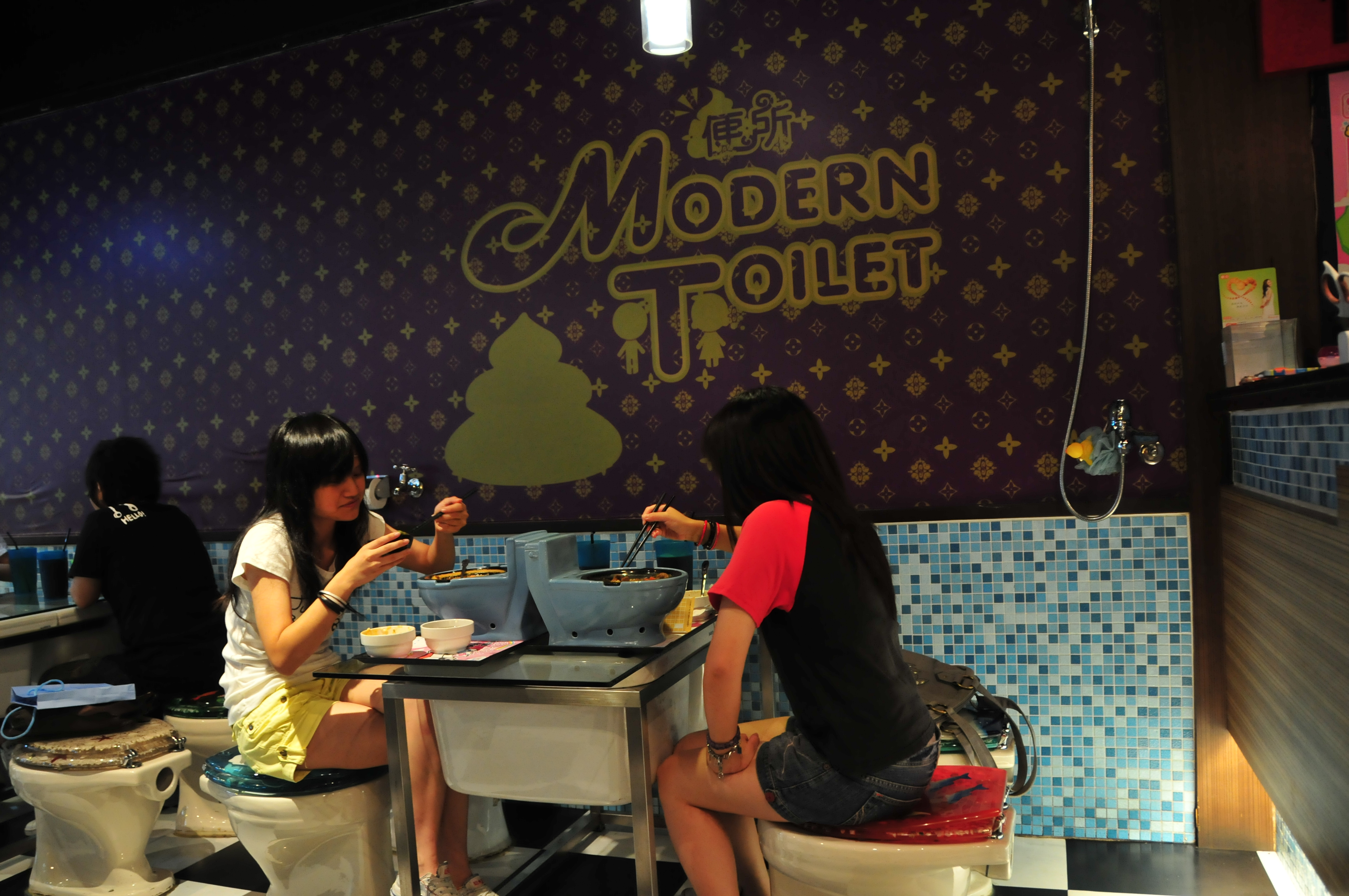

Restaurant information
- Location: Taiwan

Modern Toilet Restaurant (Chinese: 便所主題餐廳; pinyin: Biànsuǒ Zhǔtí Cāntīng) is a toilet-themed restaurant chain, with two branches in Taiwan.

== Description ==
The Modern Toilet Restaurant three-story restaurant that occupies 260 square meters (2,800 sq ft) is based on items from a toilet room or a bathroom. The checkered tile covered walls are adorned with showerheads, while plungers hang from the ceiling along with feces-shaped lights. The chairs are actual toilets (not operable), dishes are served on plastic miniature toilet bowls, and drinks are presented in miniature urinals. Owner Wang Tzi-Wei opened Modern Toilet after the success of his ice cream shop that sold swirls of ice cream served in mini toilets. It is not unusual for Taiwan to host restaurants with odd themes; Taiwan also has eating locales that resemble jailhouses and hospitals.

== History ==
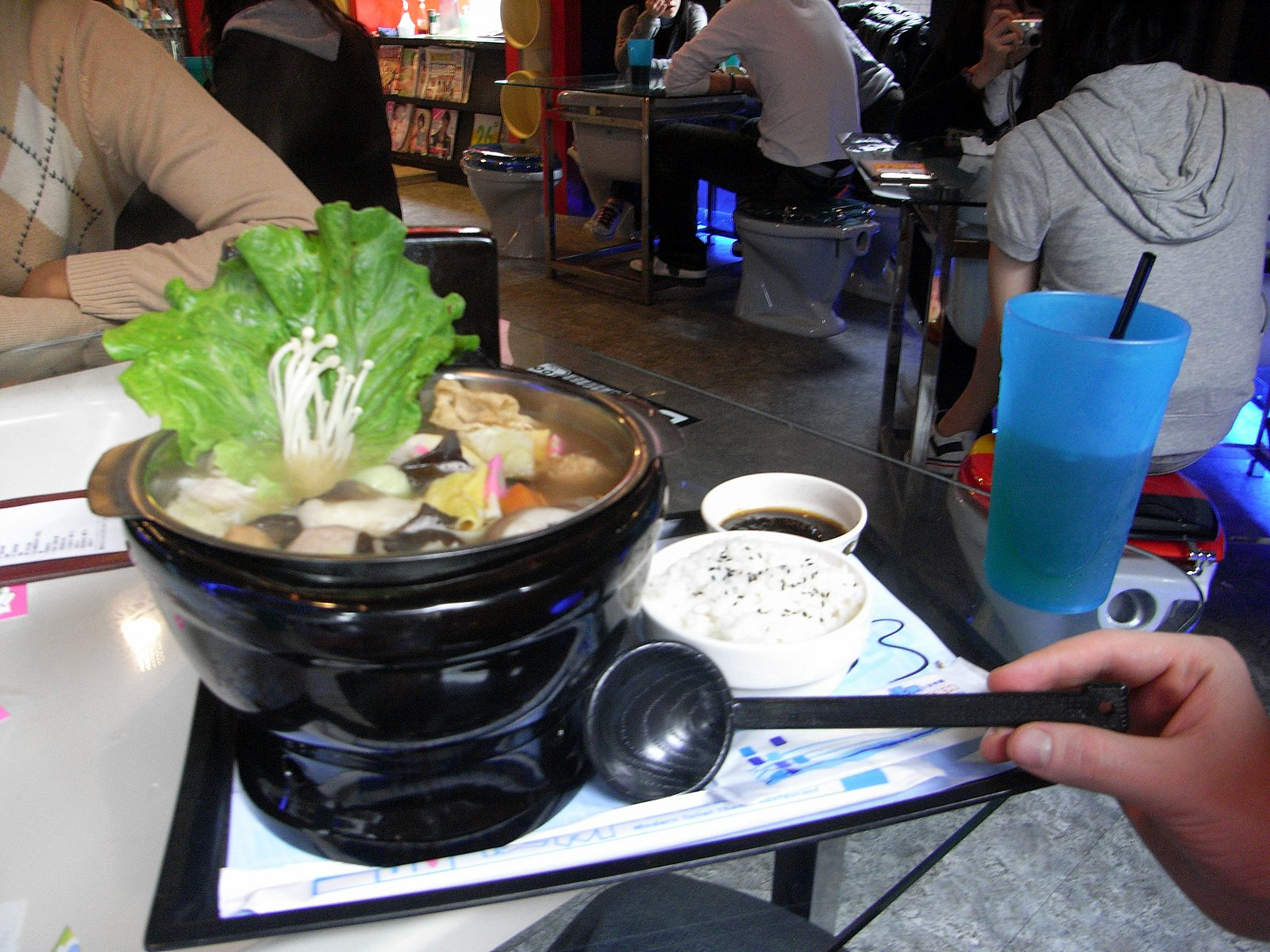
Toilet hot pot

Owner Dao Ming Zi, an ex-banker, stated that his inspiration for the toilet-themed restaurant came from a robot character from the Japanese cartoon Dr. Slump who loved to "play with poop and swirl it on a stick". From this cartoon inspiration, he started a successful ice cream shop selling swirled chocolate ice cream on top of paper squat toilets. The chain of Modern Toilets started in Kaohsiung, Taiwan, and as of 2020 has three branches in Taiwan. There were formerly 19 locations including two in Hong Kong.

== Dining ==
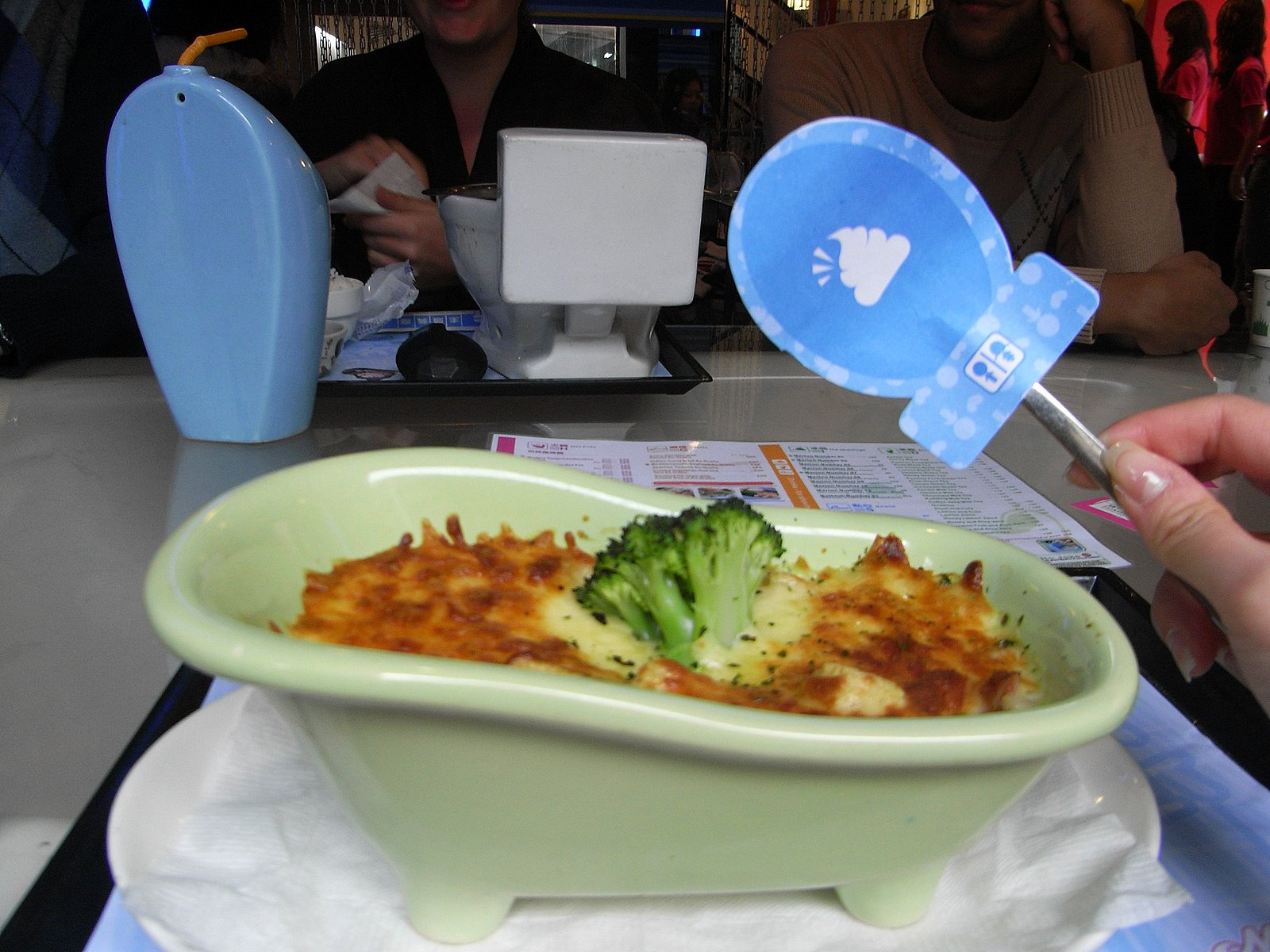
Bathtub gratin dish

Customers dine while sitting on acrylic toilets adorned with "roses, seashells or renaissance paintings". The tables that the meals are served on are bathroom sinks covered with glass tops. Meals are served in miniature toilet bowls and drinks are in miniature plastic urinals which the customers can take home with them as a souvenir. Dessert ice cream is served in a dish that resembles a squat toilet.

== See also ==
- Toilet meal
