= Mariko Aoki phenomenon =

Urge to defecate after entering a bookstore

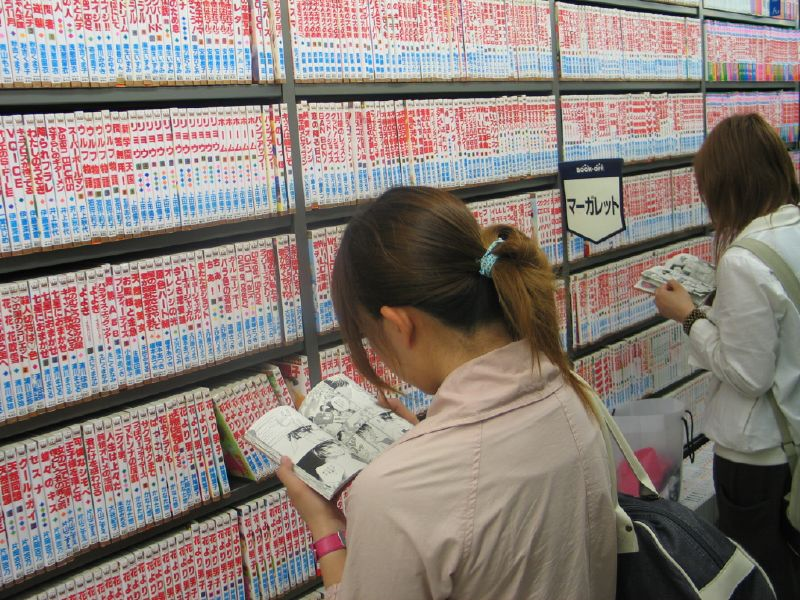
Customers standing and reading manga in a Japanese bookstore

The Mariko Aoki phenomenon (青木まりこ現象, Aoki Mariko genshō) is the sudden urge to defecate that is felt upon entering bookstores. The phenomenon is named after Mariko Aoki, a woman who described the effect in a magazine article published in 1985. According to Japanese social psychologist Shōzō Shibuya, the specific causes that trigger a defecation urge in bookstores are not yet clearly understood. There are also some who are skeptical about whether such a peculiar phenomenon really exists at all, and it is sometimes discussed as one type of urban myth.

The series of processes through which being in a bookstore leads to an awareness of a defecation urge is something that cannot be explained from a medical perspective as a single pathological concept, at least at present. According to a number of discussions on the topic, even if it can be sufficiently found that this phenomenon actually exists, it is a concept that would be difficult to be deemed a specific pathological entity (such as a "Mariko Aoki disease", for example).

== Origin ==
The term receives its name from Mariko Aoki, an otherwise little-known Japanese woman who contributed an essay in 1985 to the magazine Hon no Zasshi ("Book Magazine"). In that essay, she related how she came to the realization that, for some years, walking around a bookstore inevitably made her want to go to the toilet. The editors of the magazine received reports of other readers who had similar experiences, and named it the "Mariko Aoki phenomenon."

== Hypotheses ==
Possible theories behind the phenomenon include the smell of paper or ink having a laxative effect, the association with reading on the toilet at home, and the posture of browsing making bowel movement easier. The evidence for these explanations, however, remains weak. The psychological hypothesis that the effect arises from feelings of nervous tension in the face of all the information represented on the bookshelves is supported by certain literary figures. Some booklovers, including Roger Miller, hypothesize that being surrounded by thousands of beautiful books relaxes them so thoroughly that the bowels themselves become relaxed.

Research into the phenomenon remains inconclusive, with no definitive scientific explanation for why some individuals experience this sudden urge.

== History in Japan ==
=== Before "Mariko Aoki" ===
One known mention in Japan dating back many decades regarding a relationship between bookstores and the defecation urge is in Junnosuke Yoshiyuki's Amidst the Hustle and Bustle (1957), and similar mentions can be found in works by Jō Toyoda (in 1972's The Emperor and the Lieutenant) or Nejime Shōichi (in 1981's Words, Too, Can Sweat—Literally), but it is uncertain from exactly what point in time the phenomenon first began to be a topic of discussion. It appears to have already been raised in the media from as early as the 1980s. For example, the magazine Common Man Weekly (August 31, 1984, issue) records television newscaster Tetsuo Suda talking about a similar experience. Also, the radio program Young Paradise (on Nippon Broadcasting System from 1983 to 1990) had a segment for sharing bowel movement related episodes, and one time the defecation urge felt in bookstores was discussed by being referred to as the "Yoshiko Yamada syndrome".

Vol. 39 of Book Magazine (December 1984; Book Magazine Company) contains a man from Ikoma city in Nara prefecture discussing a similar experience. Although this man's account of his experience did not garner any particular attention at the time of Vol. 39's publication, the magazine's publisher, Kōji Meguro, later conjectured that the phenomenon probably already existed "below the radar" even before "Mariko Aoki".

=== Special feature article of Book Magazine and naming of the phenomenon ===
The name "Mariko Aoki phenomenon" had its beginnings in a real-life experience account sent in to the readers' letters column of the Japanese magazine Book Magazine (published by Book Magazine Company) in 1985. Printed in the magazine's 40th volume (in February 1985), the letter was by a woman from Suginami city in Tokyo who was 29 years old at the time, and stated that "I'm not sure why, but since about two or three years ago, whenever I go to a bookstore I am struck by an urge to move my bowels." The magazine's publisher, Meguro, has recalled that, at the time "Chief editor Makoto Shiina included the letter because he thought it was amusing." Although the letter itself was short in length and was not augmented by any particular editorial comments or the like, immediately upon the magazine's publication, a large number of readers troubled by the same phenomenon sent opinions in to the editorial department. Due to the scale of the reaction, the next issue (Vol. 41 in April 1985) included a special feature article bearing the sensational title "The Phenomenon Currently Shaking the Bookstore Industry!", containing discussions on the issue from various perspectives. In the course of such discussion, the phenomenon (the sudden occurrence of a defecation urge when in bookstores) came to be named the "Mariko Aoki phenomenon", after the author of the original letter. In relation to this, it has been noted that it was popular in late 1980s Japan to have terms ending with "phenomenon", an example being the use of the expression "Akira Asada phenomenon", which took the name of a central figure in the "new academism" that was a much-discussed topic at the time. Although the feature article ran very long at 14 pages, it did not ultimately offer any clarity regarding an explanation for the phenomenon. The name of the phenomenon was also displayed on the cover of that issue, which has been said to have led to the name's becoming known throughout Japan.

=== Reaction to the naming ===
When the special feature article was published in 1985, the Mariko Aoki phenomenon received considerable coverage, with even one of Japan's leading magazines Weekly Bunshun (published by Bungeishunju Ltd.) being quick to feature the topic in its May 2, 1985, issue. Book Magazine publisher Meguro believed that one of the reasons that the reaction was so considerable was that it was an ordinary, young woman who had divulged this concern regarding the delicate topic of her own defecation urge. Aoki herself has been interviewed multiple times by the Book Magazine editorial department since 1985, and has remarked that she is not particularly bothered by her name being used. The phenomenon has continued to be referred to sporadically in various media since 1985 and has given birth to a large amount of conjecture and speculation.

=== In the 1990s (television programs that sought to verify the phenomenon) ===
While there has at times been a tendency to view the connection between bookstores and the defecation urge as a preposterous urban legend, specialists have also appeared who have added detailed insight into the topic, such that in the latter half of the 1990s it came to be accepted as an actually existing phenomenon. This can be considered to be due to the impact of television programs that were broadcast during that time.

The topic was favorably introduced in 1995 on the television program Lifestyle Refresh Morning (in the episode broadcast on July 26, 1995, on NHK G).

In his 1993 book Seinlanguage, comedian Jerry Seinfeld described the experience, and joked that more bookstores should include a bathroom for this reason.

On the 1998 television program The Real Side of Un'nan (in the episode broadcast on October 28, 1998, on TBS Television), personalities claiming to have experienced the phenomenon—including Kiyotaka Nanbara, Maako Kido, Seikō Itō and Keisuke Horibe—carried out extensive tests that also featured experts. There was a big response to this broadcast, and the program featured special segments related to this topic on multiple occasions thereafter (such as in the episode broadcast on January 20, 1999).

=== In the 2000s (the Internet era) ===
From the year 2000 onward as the Internet grew, the Mariko Aoki phenomenon came to be even more widely known. In 2002, an Internet search using the keywords "bookstore, defecation urge" in Japanese produced links to dozens of websites discussing the phenomenon. Another factor that increased its visibility was when, in 2003, the weekly magazine Aera (November 17, 2003, edition; The Asahi Shimbun Co.) compiled a comprehensive report on the phenomenon. According to one person from the bookstore industry, around that time university students could often be seen visiting bookstores to interview staff in order to research the phenomenon. The 2004 film Mean Girls features a joke where Karen Smith mentions Gretchen Wieners having diarrhea while they were at Barnes & Noble.

In 2012, on the television program The Quiz God (TBS; episode broadcast on June 29, 2012), the contestants were asked the question, "What is the name generally given to the phenomenon named after the woman who submitted a letter to a magazine in 1985 about the phenomenon of experiencing a defecation urge when one is in a bookstore for a long period of time?" Of the 20 contestants, 10 correctly answered. Quiz scholar and designer Hiroshi Nishino has observed that even when phrases—such as the "Mariko Aoki phenomenon" or the "Dylan effect" (a Japanese phrase referring to how a song or part of it can get stuck in one's head on an endless loop)—have not received academic consensus, "when they have an appealing sound to them they are increasingly being asked as quiz questions".

According to Book Magazine's publisher Shigeru Hamamoto, the magazine was still occasionally receiving inquiries from television programs or other magazines even in 2012. Hamamoto stated that the phenomenon was not just a one-time topic and is probably one that will continue to be talked about into the future.

While the phrase "Mariko Aoki phenomenon" is not one generally used in fields such as medicine or biology, due to its history of being a topic of interest such as in the examples set out above, it is even sometimes introduced as being standard nomenclature. It has also been introduced in the same category as terminology from psychology and sociology such as "Peter Pan syndrome" and "empty-nest syndrome".

== Epidemiology in Japan ==
Persons with a history of experiencing the Mariko Aoki phenomenon were described as having a "book bowel" tendency (書便派, sho'ben-ha) in Vol. 41 of Book Magazine. No epidemiological research regarding people with a book bowel tendency had been reported as of 2012, nor do any statistics exist regarding a detailed morbidity rate or the like.

According to one very small-scale study, while the fact that people with a book bowel tendency existed throughout all of Japan indicated a lack of any regional difference, a female bias was observed, with a male to female ratio of between 1:4 to 1:2. It has also been posited that the tendency is uncommon in so-called "sporty males".

One report has estimated the prevalence as being between 1 in 10 to 1 in 20 people. It has also been approximated that at least a few million people in Japan have experienced the phenomenon. According to a Japanese online survey that was targeted at working women between the ages of 22 and 33, the number of responses answering "Yes" to the question "Have you ever felt a defecation urge when in a bookstore?" was 40 out of 150 (26.7%).

While there is no clear peak age of onset, instances of adult onset appear to be common, with the 20s and 30s age groups being prominent. On the other hand, instances of children who experience the phenomenon have also been reported.

It can be said to be a phenomenon that anyone could potentially experience, as there appears to be no difference in the rate of incidence depending on family history. Aoki's mother, however, had said that she feels there might be some kind of genetic factor involved in the phenomenon, given that her own younger brother (i.e., Mariko Aoki's uncle) experienced similar symptoms to those of Mariko. The phenomenon is also known to show a tendency to pass on from person to person.

There has been found to many affected individuals among people such as authors and those involved in publishing. On the other hand, a tendency can be seen for the phenomenon to not occur readily among people such as bookstore employees or the families of bookstore managers. But there is not a complete absence of cases among people related to bookstores. Plastic surgeon Kiyoshi Matsuo has noted that "it can occur to anyone".

== Clinical picture ==
=== Concept ===
It can be understood from the cases that have been reported that the phenomenon can present with a wide range of symptoms other than the typical pattern. The classic clinical picture can be defined based on Aoki's original letter as follows:

1. after being in a bookstore for a long period of time (contributing factor),
2. suddenly (timing of onset),
3. an urge to defecate arises (symptom).

All variations of the phenomenon are expressed in the form of the symptom of "an inexplicable defecation urge related to bookstores". It is not the case that there is any one particular disease or disorder called the "Mariko Aoki phenomenon". The psychiatrists Masao Nagazawa (1985) and Kazuo Sakai (2003) have concluded that "it is unclear what the specific causes might be, but, at the least, experiencing a 'defecation urge in a bookstore' is not a disease". However, Aoki's letter (constituting primary literature in this respect) contains the language "I ended up with the same disease (soon after my friend complained of her own symptoms)", and in humorous contexts, the phenomenon is likened to a disease. It is also the case that the editorial department of Book Magazine has used expressions such as "this ailment of sorts" (1958) and "a peculiar disease that is rampant throughout the world" (1994)".

In his book What is Illness? (1970, Chikuma Shobo), Yoshio Kawakita asserted that "illness is actually not a scientific concept but is a pragmatic concept based on an understanding between the patient side and the physician side", and this assertion was borrowed by clinical psychologist Toshio Kasahara (2010), who stated that, since most of the people who experience the Mariko Aoki phenomenon do not seek medical attention at hospitals or medical clinics, he does not consider it an illness.

Psychiatrist Takashi Sumioka (1997), meanwhile, has noted the possibility that hidden behind the symptom of "wanting to go to the bathroom" may be a condition such as irritable bowel syndrome or anxiety disorder.

=== Contributing factors ===
Aoki relates that "being in a bookstore for a long period of time" or "smelling the scent of new books for a long period of time" will set off the series of symptoms. According to Aoki, the symptoms can develop in such situations regardless of the type of book, whether "when cradling a high-brow literary tome" or "when standing to browse-read a manga comic". Aoki also notes that the phenomenon can be reproduced more readily "when a bit constipated" or "on the morning after having a nightcap".

As for locations where the phenomenon is experienced, reports include that "symptoms are particular strong when in a large bookstore", "it readily occurs at English language booksellers", "it can occur not just in bookstores that sell new books but also in secondhand bookstores or libraries", "it occurs only in libraries", and when the member of a magazine editorial team "is in the company's archives room". There are also cases where, once people exit a bookstore due to having perceived a defecation urge, before they know it, the symptoms have subsided. Cases have also been identified where the phenomenon does not occur in bookstores, secondhand bookstores, or libraries, but in places such as CD stores, video rental stores, and video game stores. According to an online survey targeting working females aged 22 to 34 who were asked in what situations they tend to be confronted with a "sudden defecation urge", while responses were received of the likes of "when standing on the train on the way to work" and "when feeling nervous before a meeting", the response "when in a bookstore" stood out particularly.

The circumstances of the moment in which the defecation urge appears have been described as including "when reading the spine covers of books", "when looking through the bookshelves in bookstores", "when standing in bookstores while browse-reading", "when viewing the spine titles of the array of books laid out on bookshelves", "as soon as having entered a bookstore and being surrounded by bookshelves", "when selecting a book from the library", and "directly after doing a once-through of the new release books".

One opinion is that "it often happens when reading serious books such as literary works". The novelist Jirō Asada has said that the strength of the symptoms are proportionally related to the size of the bookstore and the degree of difficulty of the books he is looking for.

Another person who used to be struck by a defecation urge whenever going to a bookstore reported that the symptoms suddenly resolved themselves immediately upon starting a part-time job at a bookstore.

In subsequent media interviews, Aoki has added the following details about the phenomenon:

- When walking around in circles through the bookshelves in bookstores, she will suddenly want to go to the bathroom.
- The phenomenon occurs when she has been in a bookstore for an hour or more.
- The phenomenon occurs completely irrespective of the type of books.
- It has never happened to her in a library or secondhand bookstore.
- She has also worked in a printery where there were many opportunities for exposure to the smell of paper and ink, but there was never any onset of the symptoms.

=== Onset and symptoms ===
Persons who have experienced this phenomenon all share the same complaint: "a sudden awareness of an unbearable defecation urge". The Book Magazine reporting team listed features of this defecation urge that included urgency in the lower abdominal area, shivers across the entire body, facial pallor, cold sweat (greasy sweat), and a bow-legged gait. Borborygmus is cited as an objective symptom, described as "the belly making a gurgling noise" and "gurgle-gurgle gurrrrgle". The thinker Tatsuru Uchida has called these clinical presentations a "latrine-seeking" problem. People walking around looking for a bathroom have also been described as "wearing a vacant stare".

There are also known to be cases of not simply a defecation urge but also symptoms such as abdominal pain or diarrhea. There are also said to be cases where what presents is not an urge to defecate but an urge to urinate, or need to urinate frequently. Results from a survey of 30 people reported that, of 18 people who responded that they "have an experience of [being in a bookstore and] going to the bathroom and using the toilet", 7 people responded that they "experienced a defecation urge only" and another 7 that they "experienced a urination urge only", while 4 people responded that they experienced "both a defecation and a urination urge".

The defecation urge that is experienced has been explained to have characteristics such as "a kind of heaving sensation in the rectal passage", "a dull convulsive pain in the gut", "a filling-up sensation in the lower abdominal area", and "a focusing of all nervous energy on the anal area", and the intensity of the sensation has been variously described with expressions such as "enough to make one scared about going to a bookstore again", "hellish", and "Armageddon-class". Even in cases where the subject manages to remain continent, it is described as "a frustrating situation of half wanting to go to the bathroom and half feeling like one can put it off".

No prodromal symptoms are known, with the phenomenon said to "occur regardless of how good one's physical condition is". The state of mind immediately prior to and following onset has been complained of as a deflating feeling "of sheer patheticness". There are also people who fall into a state of anticipatory anxiety about "whether it might happen again next time". Some people have talked of a peculiar experience of "a heightened feeling in the mind of deep, literary emotion".

When symptoms become severe, the phenomenon can even come to impact quality of life, including people saying, "I can't take my time looking for books because I end up wanting to go to the bathroom", "I get other people to buy the books I need", "As soon as I've bought the book I need, I get outside the bookstore", "I can't go to a bookstore wearing white pants (because of the risk of incontinence)", and "Even just dreaming of entering a bookstore always makes me want to go to the bathroom". Although an extreme example, one company executive reported "I make sure never to get anywhere near a bookstore." Regarding the threat of incontinence, the thinker Uchida has expressed it as "in the worst case scenario, entailing a traumatic scene from which it would be difficult to restore one's honor as an adult member of society".

== Pathological condition and observations ==
Although there has been much examination by numerous experts and thinkers as to the mechanisms of the phenomenon, a consensus of opinion has yet to be reached. The author Junichiro Uemae has commented that, at first glance, there appears to be no common thread, in a manner akin to the hypothetical concept of "the flap of a butterfly's wings in Brazil setting off a tornado in Texas".

To date, there has been little attempt to scientifically validate the phenomenon, such that the state of observation currently does not extend much beyond experts and thinkers asserting their own theories among each other, theories which are based on subjective judgment.

== See also ==
- Toilet meal – Japanese phenomenon of eating in a bathroom
- Toilets in Japan
- The Bookstore (Seinfeld)
