= DiMassimo Goldstein =

American advertising agency

DiMassimo Goldstein is an American marketing, advertising and design agency founded in May 1996 in New York City. The firm has more than 50 employees.

== History ==
DiMassimo Goldstein was founded in 1996 by Mark DiMassimo, a former creative director/vice president at Kirshenbaum & Bond. DiMassimo also previously worked at J. Walter Thompson, BBDO, and Chapman Direct Advertising. The firm’s original name was DiMassimo Inc. and opened with estimated billings of $15–20 million USD. In 2007, Lee Goldstein became an owner and the name was changed to DiMassimo Goldstein.

In 2012, DiMassimo Goldstein was featured on AMC’s reality series The Pitch, where it competed for the account of the women’s clothing and accessory brand C. Wonder.

Currently, DiMassimo is Founder/Creative Chief, Goldstein is co-CEO, Lesley Bielby, who rejoined the agency in 2021 is Co-CEO and CS0. As of 2018, the company's clients include Weight Watchers, the Bronx Zoo, Jackson Hewitt, Ally, Proactiv, and The Partnership for Drug-Free Kids.

== Notable campaigns ==
The company's stated focus is "behavior change marketing," which entails working with clients whose products or services are chiefly focused on helping customers change their behavior. This practice is centered around the agency's proprietary ethos of "Inspiring Action"

• In 2002, the firm created seatback cards for the fitness chain Crunch Fitness and the airline JetBlue, titled “Airplane Yoga” and “Flying Pilates”, designed to illustrate relaxing or strengthening poses that could be done while in an economy class seat.

• In 2007, DiMassimo co-founded "Tappening", a social marketing effort to promote the use of tap water and reduce the environmental impact of single-use plastic water bottles. In 2010, the agency launched "Offlining" to encourage people to occasionally disengage from digital distractions. In 2017, the agency released its first list of "Behavior Change Marketers of the Year."

• In 2014, the firm was the first ad agency to accept the virtual currency of Bitcoin as a method of payment for its services.

• In 2015, the firm ran a rebranding campaign for Weight Watchers, deemphasizing the counting of calories in favor of the company's newly introduced "Freestyle" program, which aims to identify the overall healthfulness of foods through a points program. By the end of DiMassimo Goldstein's relationship with Weight Watchers, the company had experienced 10 consecutive quarters of membership growth.

• A 2016 campaign for Sallie Mae (“Let’s Make College Happen”) was designed to show the positive effect of scholarships on four young people who would not have been able to afford college otherwise. Ads in 2017 for the Bronx Zoo highlighted a Halloween event at the zoo.

• This year, DiMassimo Goldstein ran a creative campaign for Shutterstock that featured digital commercials that parody pop culture using the company's library of stock footage. Some notable subjects of these ads: Fyre Festival, Stranger Things, Game of Thrones and the 50th Anniversary of the Moon Landing

== Awards and recognition ==
DiMassimo Goldstein was on the "Inc. 5000" list of the fastest growing companies in the United States, published by Inc. magazine, for the years 2014, 2015, 2016 and 2017. In 2014, the firm was awarded Advertising Age magazine's "Small Agency of the Year" for the Northeast region. Fast Company magazine included the company in its list of "Foremost World-Changing Agencies" in 2009.
