= Soka School System =

The Soka School System (Japanese: 創価学園 Hepburn: Sōka Gakuen) is a Japanese corporate body that oversees a series of kindergartens, elementary schools, junior high schools, and high schools in Japan and several other countries as well as an educational support and research facility. It is part of a wider network of "Soka" schools which includes Soka University of Japan, Soka University of America, and Soka Women's College. In addition, it has a supportive relationship with several non-affiliated schools and research associations in countries outside of Japan.

In order of their openings, the network includes Soka Junior and Senior High Schools (1968; Tokyo), Soka University (1971; Tokyo), Kansai Soka Junior and Senior High Schools (1973; Osaka), Sapporo Soka Kindergarten (1976), Tokyo Soka Elementary School (1978), Kansai Soka Elementary School (1982; Osaka), Soka Women's College (1985; Tokyo), Soka University of America (1987, 2001), Hong Kong Soka Kindergarten (1992), Singapore Soka Kindergarten (1993), Malaysia Soka Kindergarten (1995), Brazil Soka (elementary, middle, and high) School (2001), Brazil Soka Kindergarten (2001), Soka Happiness Kindergarten of South Korea (2008) and Soka International School Malaysia (2023). Also, one of Japan's largest correspondence education programs is administered by Soka University in Tokyo.

The underlying educational philosophy and curriculum perspectives of the Soka School System has influenced the work of many educators in Japan and abroad.

The founder of the Soka School System is Daisaku Ikeda. The Soka School System receives financial support from the Soka Gakkai Buddhist society. The majority of students enrolled are members of the Soka Gakkai although no priority is given to members in admissions decisions. Its educational program is non-sectarian despite the Soka Gakkai's relationship to Nichiren Buddhism. Its buildings and campuses have been noted as architecturally supportive of the schools’ stated philosophy, designed to be bright and expansive with scenic views.

== Educational philosophy, curriculum, and methodology ==
The Soka School System's educational philosophy, labeled “Soka education” or “value-creative education,” sets the goal of education as the realization of students' happiness. Realizing this vision on a broader scale, according to Ikeda, requires a paradigmatic shift from education being seen as supporting society to a vision of society serving the essential needs of education.

The mission of schools, according to Soka education, should be to protect the dignity of human life and human rights. Its methodology is based on “human education” rather than the more popularly used term “humanistic education.” Here, the teacher serves as a role model of pacifism, assuming the Buddhist function of a bodhisattva. The teacher's role is to help students realize the inner dignity of their lives, nurture the will to live more strongly, and empathize with the pain of others. The curriculum has a strong focus on peace, human rights, sustainable development, and environmental education.

== History ==
The roots of the Soka School System is traced to the pedagogical work of Tsunesaburo Makiguchi, a Japanese educator and geographer in the early 20th century whose first published works were books about geography and community studies education. He further developed his theories in praxis as a principal of five elementary schools in Tokyo. Makiguchi's final book, ‘’The System of Value-Creating Pedagogy’’ (Jpn: Soka kyoikugaku taikei), was published in 1930. Here Makiguchi wrote about happiness, defined as the ability to create personal and social value, as the goal of both life and education. Josei Toda, Makiguchi's colleague and disciple, experimented with Makiguchi's theories in an afterschool tutoring center he operated and also edited Makiguchi's comments and notes into publishable form. In founding the Soka School System, Ikeda modernized and broadened Makiguchi's vision of Soka education On his many visits to the Soka schools Ikeda modeled the types of caring for students he hoped staff members would embrace.

=== Education Institution List ===
Kindergartens

- Sapporo Soka Kindergarten - Toyohira-ku, Sapporo, Hokkaido, Japan, founded in 1976
- Hong Kong Soka Kindergarten - Hong Kong, founded in 1992
- Malaysia Soka Kindergarten (Tadika Seri Soka) - Kajang, Selangor, Malaysia, founded in 1995
- Brazil Soka Kindergarten - São Paulo, Brazil, founded in 2001
- Soka Happiness Kindergarten - Dongjak District, Seoul, South Korea, founded in 2008

Preschool

- Singapore Soka Preschool - Singapore, founded in 1993

Elementary schools

- Tokyo Soka Elementary School - Kodaira, Tokyo, Japan, founded in 1978
- Kansai Soka Elementary School - Hirakata, Osaka, Japan, founded in 1982
- Fang Zhao-ling Soka Elementary School - Guangdong, China, founded in 2001
- Xuan-tang Soka Elementary School - Guangdong, China, founded in 2003
- Brazil Soka School - São Paulo, Brazil, founded in 2003

Junior and senior high schools

- Soka Gakuen Tokyo Campus - Kodaira, Tokyo, Japan, founded in 1968
- Soka Gakuen Kansai Campus - Katano, Osaka, Japan, founded in 1973
- Soka International School Malaysia - Negeri Sembilan, Malaysia, founded in 2022

Junior colleges

- Soka Women's College - Hachiōji, Tokyo, Japan, founded in 1985
- Soka Ikeda College of Art and Science for Women - Tamil Nadu, India, founded in 2000
- Soka International School Malaysia - Negeri Sembilan, Malaysia, founded in 2022

University

- Soka University - Hachiōji, Tokyo, Japan, founded in 1971
- Soka University of America - Aliso Viejo, California, United States founded in 1987

== Research ==
One of the first western scholars to research Soka education and its applications was Dayle M. Bethel who wrote a biography of Makiguchi and who edited and translated his “Geography of Human Life” and “Value-Creating Education.” This was followed by Carl H. Gross’ anecdotal report on his visit to the newly formed Soka High School in Tokyo.

Qualitative research has emerged in the form of books, articles, and dissertations. Considerable textual analysis of the Ikeda corpus is taking place at the Institute for Daisaku Ikeda Studies at DePaul University's College of Education. The Soka Education Research Initiative on Global Citizenship (SERI-GC) is a five-year research project launching at the University of Guelph-Humber in Canada the promotes study of the philosophy and practices of Soka education and its connection to global citizenship which is funded by the Japan-based Makiguchi Foundation for Education. An annual student-led conference about applications of Soka education takes place annually at Soka University of America.

The Soka Gakkai sponsors several research institutes:

- The Institute of Oriental Philosophy - Japan, founded in 1962
- Amazon Ecological Conservation Center - Manaus, Brazil, founded in 1992
- The Ikeda Center for Peace, Learning and Dialogue - Boston, United States, founded in 1993
- The Toda Peace Institute (formerly called the Toda Institute for Global Peace and Policy Research) - Japan, founded in 1996
- The International Committee of Artists for Peace (ICAP) - United States, founded in 2002

== External websites ==
- Soka School System (Soka Gakuen). http://www.soka.ed.jp/english/index.html
- Understanding Soka Education: A Bibliography. Ikeda Center for Peace. Learning, and Dialogue. http://www.ikedacenter.org/about/education-fellows/bibliography
