= The Nine Consciousness =

Buddhist concept

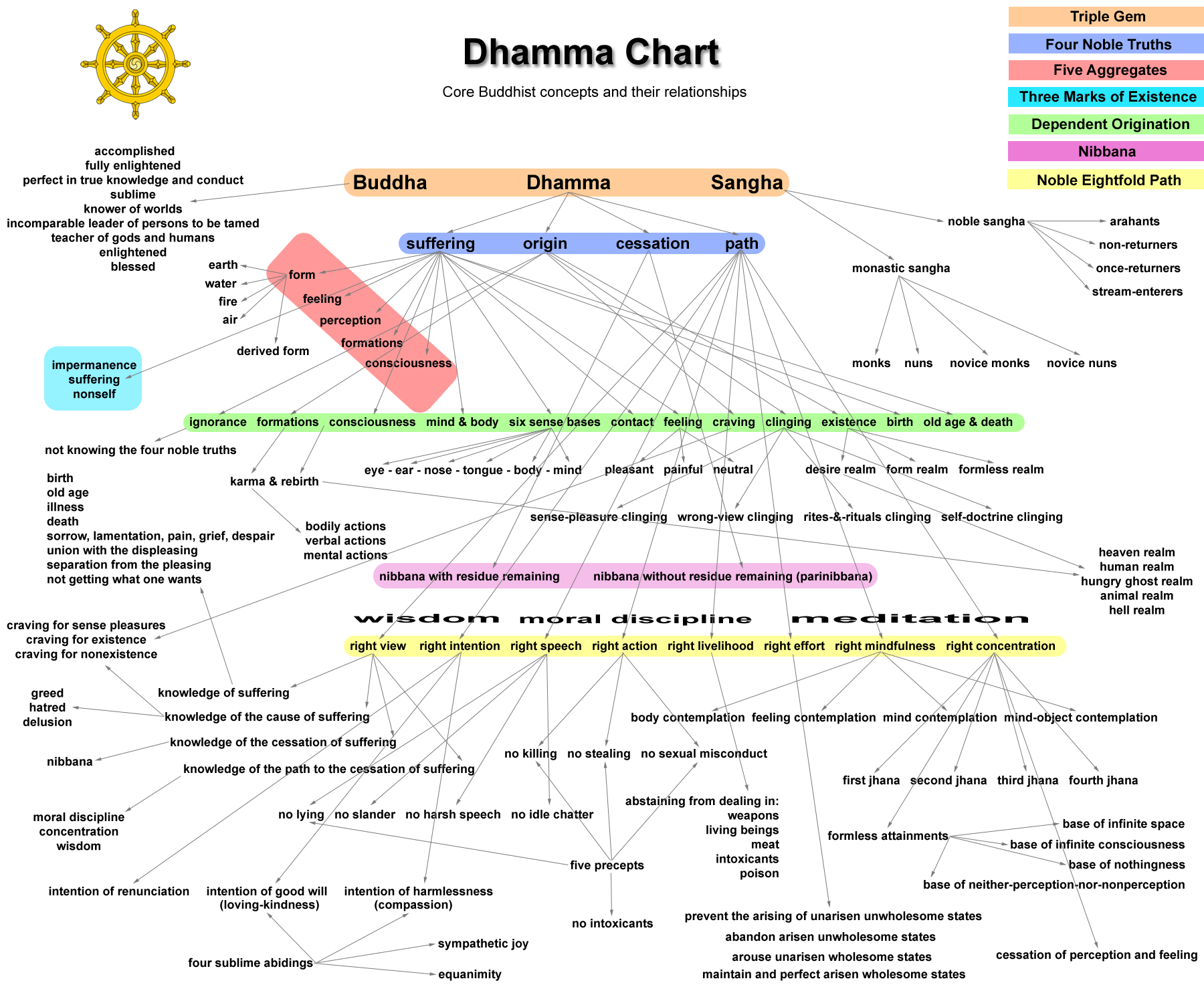
A diagram outlining Buddhism's core concepts and their relationships

The Nine Consciousness is a concept in Buddhism, specifically in Nichiren Buddhism, that theorizes there are nine levels that comprise a person's experience of life. It fundamentally draws on how people's physical bodies react to the external world, then considers the inner workings of the mind which result in a person's actions.

== Background ==
According to Buddhism teachings, what is stopping the attainment of happiness are unconscious attachments to a lesser self. In order to achieve true happiness, one can practice the Nine Consciousness theory, a concept which helps one understand their true identity. The goal is to accept one's "infinitely expanded true self", by letting go of previously-held perceptions of who they were.

The word "consciousness" in Buddhism was translated from the Sanskrit word "vijnana", and refers to one's self-awareness and one's capability to discern the various energies that influence their lives.

== Definition ==
The Nine Consciousness levels firstly consists of the five senses (touch, taste, sight, hearing, smell.) One is aware of these five consciousness levels from the moment they are born, taking in information about the outside world.

The sixth consciousness is when one learns to understand what is being taken in from the five senses. This is the level that integrates all the sensory input gathered by the first five levels. It achieves this by processing all the data and information, then identifies what is communicated. One is able to make judgments about one's external perceptions through this sixth level. An example would be holding an orange, and knowing that it is the orange fruit, instead of simply an orange ball. All six levels form the sentient mind.

The seventh consciousness, unlike the prior six levels, is directed towards one's inner thoughts without sensory input. Also known as "mano" in Sanskrit, this level deals with the abstract, and helps "apprehend and express the unseen, or spiritual, side of life." One can then distinguish between good and evil, and discern oneself from others. Attaining this consciousness also means one would be aware of the self, with the ability to detach or attach. Understanding one's self then results in assertiveness over one's gender, identity, nationality, etc.

Buddhism warns that as this level is similar to the concept of one's ego, being controlled by this consciousness can lead to insecurity.

The next level is the eight consciousness, or in Sanskrit "alaya", better known as the "storehouse consciousness". The "storehouse" accumulates all of one's karmic energy through interacting with others, as well as the causes and effects of one's actions. It stores all of one's thoughts, words, and deeds throughout a lifetime.

Unlike the first seven levels that cease when one dies, the eighth consciousness persists even after death. The karma collected by this consciousness accounts for every aspect of one's life in this lifetime and the next, including one's looks, circumstances, relationships, and health. One's soul is born with the previous lifetime's karma, which results in one's current circumstance in the world.

Certain patterns in a person's life, such as being stuck in a cycle of abuse, or being angered by the same person, all boils down to one's karma. However, karmic energy is ever-changing and flowing; one's situation can change according to the negative or positive karma one has accumulated after a period of time. Karma can be accumulated in both thoughts and actions.

The ninth and final consciousness, known as the Buddha nature (or Namu-myoho-renge-kyo), forms the foundations for one's life. It is the amala-consciousness, meaning the "purest", and cannot be tarnished by any of the karmic energy from the previous eight levels. Hence, a way of ridding oneself of negative karma is by rising above to the ninth consciousness.

As the ninth consciousness is the core of all energy, it also serves as the source for all mental and spiritual activity. If one is able to attain the ninth consciousness, one's soul can coexist peacefully with all lifeforms.

== Practices ==
The goal of practicing the nine consciousness is to achieve an "infinitely expanded true self". This is in accordance to Buddhist philosophy, which focuses on being liberated from one's insignificant self to attain a higher state of being. Tapping into the ninth consciousness would equate to tapping into the very core of life.

Firstly, one must be able to be acutely aware of what all five senses are taking in. This includes being conscious of what one can observe around them; the temperature, the colours, the taste or smell of the surroundings.

In his book Awakening through the Nine Bodies, yogi and author Phillip Moffitt recommends an exercise where one places their hands on their thighs and focuses on the right hand. The aim of this exercise is to feel the sensation or lack thereof, in the hands. This includes feeling the weight of one's hands, the blood pulsing through the fingers, and even the heat gathered in the palms. According to Moffitt, consciousness is a process, where the mind focuses on a sensation that one or more of the senses are in contact with the environment. Moffitt terms this stimulation of the senses "sense-consciousness".

To reach the next consciousness, meditation can also help one progress through the nine levels and eventually connect to the inner self by attaining self-awareness. The most basic method is by chanting "Namu-myoho-renge-kyo", but meditation can also be as simple as being alone in nature.

Nichiren Daishonin, founder of Nichiren Buddhism, theorised that one can transform one's karma in this lifetime by achieving the final level of consciousness. Nichiren held the belief that each person is highly valued, and our bodies serve as the "palace of the ninth consciousness".

One can access this "palace" by chanting Namu-myoho-renge-kyo The chant frees one from negative karma, improves the sensory awareness of the sixth and seventh consciousness, and purifies the karmic energy in the eighth. This creates positivity in every situation, an example being viewing a friend's anger when they yell at you as a sign of concern, rather than taking offense to it.

This mantra offers meaning behind its individual words. Namu originates from the Sanskrit word namas, and refers to the devotion of oneself - expressing both one's intention to take action as well as one's attitude.

The next word, "myoho", is an amalgamation of two words: "myo" meaning mystical, and "ho" which means law. Together, "myoho" refers to the universe's energy and the ways it manifests itself, or in other words, the Mystic Law. According to Nichiren, the word expresses both a Buddha's enlightenment and the delusions of a normal person, as they have the same essence.

Next, "renge" means lotus flower. The lotus has a strong cultural significance in Buddhism. It is pure and sweet-smelling, despite growing in muddy waters. This represents the ability to thrive amidst the sufferings of daily life. Additionally, Its ability to simultaneously produce both the flower and seed embodies the principle of "cause and effect", bringing to mind the concept of karma. The "cause" here refers to the efforts one puts in to attain Buddhahood, and the "effect" is the actual attainment. This part of the mantra recalls the attainment of the eight consciousness, reminding one that one's karma can be changed anytime.

The last word, "kyo", means "sutra", or teaching. Nichiren describes this as the "words and voices of all living beings". Its purpose in the mantra is to evoke the Buddha nature hidden within us. The Chinese character for "kyo" implies a "thread", and symbolises the continuation of life over countless lifetimes, and how it will persevere. Thus, "kyo" expresses the teaching that all that happens in the universe is from the Mystic Law manifesting itself.

A key aspect of the mantra is that it is not limited to any culture or language. This is because the mantra itself has origins in the Sanskrit, Japanese, and Chinese languages. In the thirteenth century when Nichiren was living in Japan, Sanskrit represented the West's ideas, cultures, and language, whereas Chinese represented the East's. Hence, the mantra combines the historic ideologies of both the East and West and is a universal phrase for all of mankind.

Nichiren stated that while chanting, what is in one's heart is crucial. This means that one should fully believe that one's potential has no boundaries, and be focused on the goal of achieving happiness.

It must be said that chanting this mantra is not meant to supply one with supernatural abilities, or something that is better than one that one should rely on. But rather, it represents the principle that through consistent effort, one will achieve their goals, or in this case, the different consciousness. Nichiren's advocation for the repeating chanting of this mantra is because it encompasses Buddhism's teachings, and will ultimately lead to enlightenment. He wanted a practical way for people to focus on their minds and manifest their positive thoughts into reality.

Spreading the "Namu-myoho-renge-kyo" mantra is called kosen-rufu in Buddhism.

== Significance of attaining the ninth consciousness ==
One of Buddhism's teachings is to recognise one's innate ability to overcome all challenges in life. This is because one is not separate from the fundamental laws that govern the universe.

Moffitt states that the exploration of the various consciousness is vital to one's spiritual journey. He says that being "conscious of being conscious of a moment's experience", will aid one in attaining the different consciousness. One's journey will no longer face the challenge of one's own reactivity to negative events. Moffitt states that being mindful will lead to being liberated from unnecessary mindsets, including dislikes, fears, and desires.

The Greek SGI community compares the emergence of Buddhahood in a person to a sunrise; the darkness fades away.
