= Min-On Concert Association =

Japanese musical organization

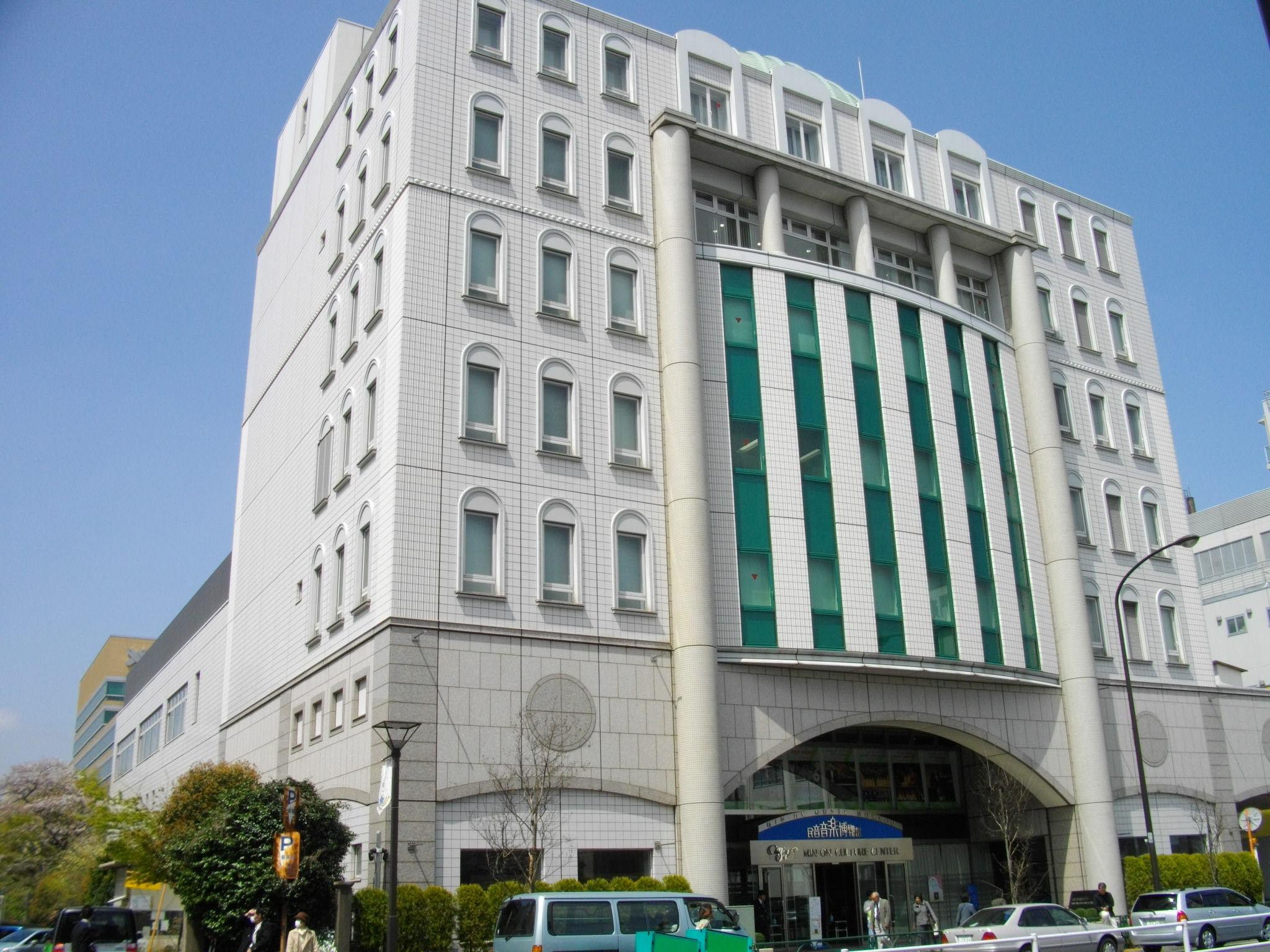
The Min-On Culture Center in Tokyo, which houses the association and its music museum and library

The Min-On Concert Association (民主音楽協会, Minshu Ongaku Kyōkai) is a Japan-based organization that promotes international music and performing arts exchanges. Founded in 1963 by Daisaku Ikeda, the organization also runs the Tokyo International Music Competition for Conducting as well as a music museum and library. The organization's offices, library and museum are located in the Min-On Culture Center in the Shinjuku-ku district of Tokyo.

== History ==
During the 1960s and into the 1980s, Daisaku Ikeda (at the time the president of the Soka Gakkai) established a number of cultural programs and institutions including the Institute of Oriental Philosophy, the Min-on Concert Association, and the Tokyo Fuji Art Museum. The Min-On Concert Association was established in 1963."Min-On" is an abbreviation of "Minshu Ongaku" or "Music for the People". The association began with a series of subscription concerts and became a foundation in 1965.

The association also began a series of exchanges which introduced performing artists from other countries to Japanese audiences and sent Japanese artists abroad.

In its early years, the organization was sometimes dismissed as sectarian. However, according to its past president Hiroyasu Kobayashi, that perception began to change in 1981 when Min-On underwrote a tour by Milan's La Scala opera company, one of the first Western opera companies to perform in Japan.

In 1997, the Min-On Cultural Center was opened in downtown Tokyo and now houses the organization's offices as well as its music museum and library. By the end of the 1990s Min-On had organized 70,000 concerts with performers from 100 different countries and attended by over 100 million people in Japan.

== Activities ==
Min-On's three main activities are its concerts, the Tokyo International Music Competition, and its music museum and library. However, it also runs the Min-On Music Research Institute, organizes lectures and conferences on music, and publishes books and monographs.

=== Concerts ===
Min-On's concert performances are held in major Japanese cities but also in small towns in the Japanese hinterland. The concerts present a wide range of styles and genres including European and Chinese opera, ballet, and indigenous folk music. In the late 1960s Min-On began its World Ballet Series which brought tours by the American Ballet Theatre and The Royal Ballet to Japan. In 1968 its also brought the Los Angeles Philharmonic to Japan for a three-week concert tour. For the La Scala tour of 1981, the .company gave 24 performances in Tokyo, Osaka and Yokohama with all performances televised by NHK. There were also two chamber music concerts by the La Scala Octet.

Other classical performers who have appeared in Japan invited by Min-On include the singers Plácido Domingo, Roberto Alagna, and Charlotte de Rothschild and the Brazilian pianist Amaral Vieira who has made multiple tours for Min-On since the early 1990s.

The Min-On Festival of Contemporary Music ran from 1969 to 1990 in conjunction with the Tokyo International Music Competition. The concerts were given at the Tokyo Bunka Kaikan concert hall and presented contemporary works by Japanese composers, several of them commissioned by the association. Recordings of the festival concerts given between 1979 and 1988 were released on the Japanese label Camerata. Min-On's annual Tango Concert Series, a long-running cultural exchange program between Japan and Argentina, began in 1970 began with a tour by the orchestra of José Basso and the singers Alfredo Belusi and Carlos Rossi.

In 2011 Jamaica became the 104th country to tour Japan in association with Min-On. The tour was the second in Min-On's Caribbean Musical Cruise series. The series began in 2009 with a tour of artists from Trinidad and Tobago.

=== Tokyo International Music Competition ===
Min-On established the Tokyo International Music Competition in 1966 as a competition for singers. A category for chamber ensembles was introduced in 1974. It is held every three years. Two of the past first prize winners, Yukinori Tezuka (1967) and Kazuhiro Koizumi (1970) became conductors of the New Japan Philharmonic. Olivier Grangean, who won the 1991 competition, later became music director of the National Symphony Orchestra of Colombia. No first prizes were awarded for the 2003, 2006, 2009, and 2012 competitions. In 2015, the first prize was awarded to the Spanish conductor Diego Martin-Etxebarria.

=== Music museum and library ===
Min-On's music museum has collections of pianos, music boxes, and ethnic musical instruments from a variety of cultures. The piano collection includes an Anton Walter piano from the early 1780s as well the piano used for 30 years by the jazz musician Herbie Hancock who donated it to the museum.

As of 2006, the library held 30,000 books, 45,000 volumes of sheet music, 200 magazine titles, and a large collection of piano rolls. It also holds thousands of photographs and audio and video recordings.

== See also ==
- List of music museums
