= Tokyo Fuji University =

Private university in Japan

Coordinates: 35°42′53.2″N 139°42′3.8″E

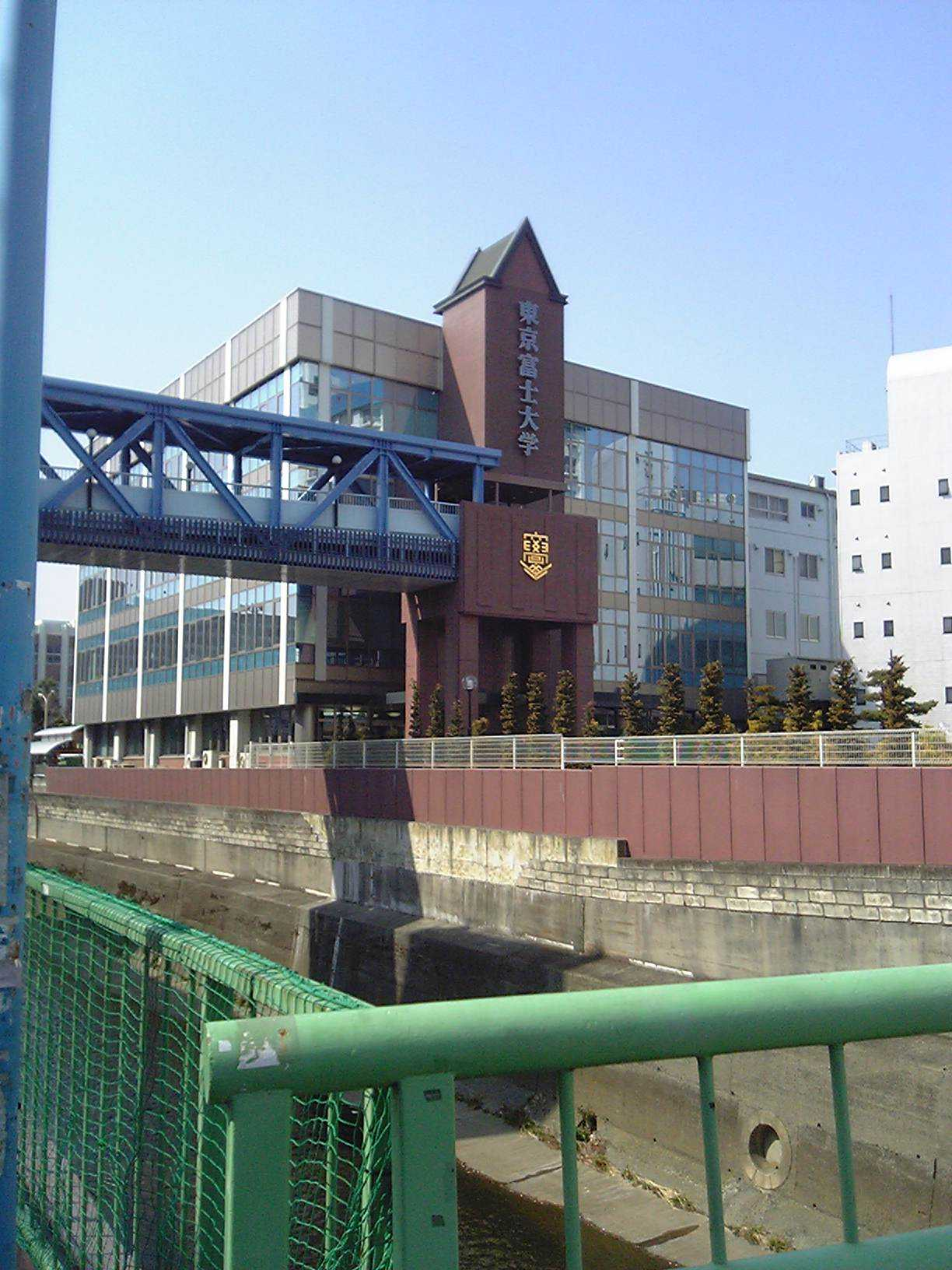
Tokyo Fuji University

Tokyo Fuji University (東京富士大学, Tōkyō fuji daigaku) is a private university in Shinjuku, Tokyo, Japan. The predecessor of the school was founded in 1943. It was chartered as a junior college in 1951 and became a four-year college in 2002.

In 2008 the Department of Psychology was established.
