= Nikken Abe =

Japanese Buddhist monk (1922–2019)

Abe Nikken 阿部日顕
- Title: 67th High Priest

Personal life
- Born: 19 December 1922 Sumida, Tokyo, Japan
- Died: 20 September 2019 (aged 96) Setagaya, Japan
- Spouse: Masako Abe
- Children: Shinsho Abe
- Education: Rissho University
- Other names: "Shinno", "Etsuyo"

Religious life
- Religion: Nichiren Shoshu Buddhism
- Ordination: 28 August 1928

Senior posting
- Based in: Taisekiji, Shizuoka Prefecture, Japan
- Period in office: 15 April 1978 – 15 December 2005
- Predecessor: Nittatsu Hosoi
- Successor: Nichinyo Hayase
- Previous post: Head of the Nichiren Shoshu doctrinal department (Kyōgaku-bu); 67th High Priest of Nichiren Shōshū

Nikken Abe (阿部日顕, Abe Nikken; also known as Nikken Shonin; 19 December 1922 – 20 September 2019) was a Japanese Buddhist monk who served as the 67th High Priest of Nichiren Shōshū and chief priest of Taiseki-ji head Temple in Fujinomiya, Japan.

Before becoming High Priest, he served as the head of the doctrinal department of Nichiren Shoshu and as such was involved in the compilation of many of the school's publications. As High Priest, Abe affirmed the permanent expulsion of the Soka Gakkai on 28 November 1991 and was known for the destruction of the "Sho Hondo" in 1997 and the return of the Head Temple Taiseki-ji to earlier traditional and orthodox practices that were prevalent up to 1970. Ultimately, he reconstructed a new replacement building "Hoando" in June 2002.

He retired as High Priest on 15 December 2005 and was succeeded by Hayase Nichinyo Shonin. Abe died on 20 September 2019 in his private residence in Nakamachi Street, in the Setagaya ward of Tokyo, aged 96.

== Early life ==
Born Nobuo (信夫), Abe was the first son of Hōun Abe, then the chief priest of Jōzen-ji in Sumida, Tokyo, and later 60th Nichiren Shoshu High Priest Nichikai. His mother, Myoshuni, was a female priest. He entered the priesthood in 1928 by tonsure, taking the Buddhist name Shinno (信雄).

He graduated from Rissho University in 1943, training as a priest. After his return from duty with the Japanese Imperial Navy, he served as chief priest of three temples:

1. Hongyōji (Sumida ward, Tokyo, 1947)
2. Heianji (Kyoto, 1963) where his mother was a resident priest
3. Jōsenji (Sumida ward, Tokyo)

He was appointed head of the school's Kyōgakubu (office of doctrinal orthodoxy, often rendered Taisekiji Study Department) in 1961. In this position, he was one of the two Nichiren Shoshu priests who traveled overseas to conduct the first initiation rites (Gojukai) for new believers outside Japan in 1961, for which the 66th high priest gave him the name "Etsuyo" (越洋: "he who crosses the seas"). Abe was named Nichiren Shoshu Sōkan (the school's second-highest ranking priest) in early 1979.

== As High Priest ==
On 22 July 1979, Abe took over as high priest, shortly after the death of the 66th High Priest Nittatsu Hosoi. At that time, he changed his name three times: he initially changed his name to Nichi-gō (the name beginning with Nichi that all priests have but use publicly after certain seniority) from Nichiji (日慈) to finally Nikken (日顕) in deference to a more senior priest who was the father of the current high priest, Nichinyo.

On 4 December 2005, Abe announced his intention to step down as high priest before the end of the year. He performed the ceremony of transferral of the Heritage of the Law on 12 December 2005, in which he appointed Nichinyo Hayase (1935—) his successor. He officially retired on 15 December 2005, four days before his 83rd birthday, after 26 years as high priest. Sixty-eighth High Priest Nichinyo Shōnin ascended to the high priest's seat at a ceremony on 16 December 2005. Abe had a wife, Masako Abe, and a son born in 1944, Shinsho Abe.

Abe's tenure as high priest was marked by a mixture of progress and controversy.

He officiated several milestone celebrations, including:

- 1981 —The 700th anniversary of Nichiren's death.
- 1982 — The 650th anniversaries of the passing of Taiseki-ji's founder Nikkō and his successor Nichimoku
- 1990 — The 700th anniversary of Taiseki-ji's founding
- 2004 — The 750th anniversary of Nichiren's proclamation of his teachings

In addition, Abe oversaw the compilation and publication of several important works, including compilations of previous high priests' letters, treatises, and sermons, and official biographies of Nichiren and his successors.

- 1981 — Nichiren Daishōnin Shōden
- 1982 — Nikkō Shōnin, Nichimoku Shōnin Shōden
- 1999 — Revision of 1978 Nichiren Shōshū Yōgi (a comprehensive overview of Nichiren Shoshu doctrine)
- 1994 — Heisei Shimpen Nichiren Daishōnin Gosho, a new compilation of Nichiren Daishonin's Gosho based on thorough historical and documentary surveys.

Abe also initiated and oversaw the publication of the following Taiseki-ji publications:

- The annotated edition of 26th High Priest Nichikan's doctrinally definitive work Rokkanshō ("The six volume writings" in 1996)
- A revised edition of the Lotus Sutra with its prologue and epilogue sutras (Shimpen Myōhōrengekyō Narabini Kaiketsu in 1998)
- The compilation of Nichikan's Gosho Mondan in 2000
- Nichikan's exegesis on fourteen of Nichiren's most important writings (Nichikan Shōnin Gosho Mondan, 2001)
- The publication of Juryōhon Seppō in 2003, a compilation of sermons he delivered over a span of 23 years on the "Life Span of the Thus Come One" (Juryō) chapter of the Lotus Sutra.

In December 1980, Abe's succession to the position of high priest was challenged by a group of Nichiren Shoshu priests belonging to the Shoshinkai after he excommunicated five of them for disobeying repeated admonitions to cancel a massive anti-Soka Gakkai rally (August 1980) and to stop attacking the Soka Gakkai, a lay organization formerly chartered by Nichiren Shoshu. Ultimately, Abe excommunicated over 200 Nichiren Shoshu priests who had aligned themselves with Shoshinkai, which balked at Abe's policy of reconciliation with the Soka Gakkai after a conflict with the group that had surfaced in the early 1970s and lasted through the end of the decade.

Abe worked to restore the Nichiren Shoshu faith to what he saw as an orthodoxy that he felt had been lost during the school's association with Soka Gakkai. These reforms began with changing back the start of Ushitora Gongyo, a prayer service for the worldwide propagation of Nichiren Shoshu Buddhism, from 12:00 midnight to its traditional time starting at 2:30 am so the service would span the eponymous "hour of the ox (ushi) and tiger (tora)".

Abe excommunicated Soka Gakkai and its senior leaders in November 1991, citing doctrinal deviations, the Soka Gakkai's usurpation of rites such as the Higan-e equinox ceremonies and funerals without Nichiren Shoshu priests officiating, its defiant staging of Ode to Joy concerts that, for their Christian themes, were incongruent with Nichiren Shoshu doctrine, and a speech (which became public when a recording was leaked) by then Soka Gakkai President Daisaku Ikeda. Actions by the Soka Gakkai were interpreted by the Nichiren Shoshu priesthood as retaliation for the priesthood's admonitions urging the Soka Gakkai leadership to follow through on earlier commitments to uphold Nichiren Shoshu doctrine and traditions, which many in the priesthood and traditional lay organizations felt the Soka Gakkai had been ignoring or furtively undermining since the death of Soka Gakkai and Hokkeko leader Josei Toda. Since its 1992 excommunication, the Soka Gakkai has adopted an accusation leveled by the Shoshinkai that Abe is a pretender to the high priest's position, on the grounds that Abe was unable to substantiate proof that his predecessor, High Priest Nittatsu Shonin, had transferred the position to him, since it had not been transferred in the traditional ceremonial manner.

Abe also left his personal mark on the grounds of Nichiren Shoshu Head Temple Taiseki-ji. He had numerous old lodging temples rebuilt and parts of the compound re-landscaped. In conjunction with some of the anniversary celebrations mentioned above, he had a bare-concrete building removed and a plaza and garden built in its place, as well as several quickly-built concrete lodgings replaced with two modern structures. After Nichiren Shoshu's excommunication of the Soka Gakkai, he also had demolished several ferro-concrete edifices donated by the Soka Gakkai, replacing them with buildings more in keeping with the atmosphere of a traditional Japanese Buddhist temple. To the Soka Gakkai this was highly controversial, considering that the buildings were built with donations from Soka Gakkai members.

After the excommunication of the Soka Gakkai, Abe founded numerous temples overseas (the last temple he founded was the Kaimyo-in Temple in Singapore in December 2005) and minor propagation centers in Africa, Southeast Asia, and South America as well as Europe and North America.

== Expulsion of the Soka Gakkai ==
The Soka Gakkai further attributes Abe's motivation for demolishing the Shohondo building (completed in 1972), the Dai Kyakuden (1964), and other buildings in the Taiseki-ji compound donated by the Soka Gakkai, to resentment towards and jealousy of the Soka Gakkai leadership and to a desire to usurp the achievements of his predecessor. Abe's demolition of the Shohondo building was particularly controversial. Its construction was completed in 1972 largely through the efforts and financial donations of Soka Gakkai members, and it was regarded as a notable work of contemporary Japanese architecture.

In response, Nichiren Shoshu stated that the official petitioner of the Shohondo, Daisaku Ikeda, was no longer a Nichiren Shoshu believer, and that therefore a structure donated by him was no longer worthy of serving as the head temple's high sanctuary, the building housing the Dai-Gohonzon, the school's most sacred object. In addition, Abe personally oversaw the transfer of the Dai-Gohonzon from the Shohondo to the Hoanden, the building that housed it during construction of the Hoando, its new home.

Additional views claim that Abe's decision to expel the Soka Gakkai was part of a personal vendetta against Daisaku Ikeda due to the following issues:

- The deliberate manufacturing of several wooden Gohonzons that Ikeda had made without the consent of previous High Priest Nittatsu Shonin
- The consistent officiation by Soka Gakkai leaders of Nichiren Shoshu ceremonies without the presence of priests.
- The 35th Soka Gakkai anniversary speech on 16 November 1990 in which SGI President Daisaku Ikeda allegedly made vulgar statements insulting the dignity of the priesthood.

However, Nichiren Shoshu insists that the issue behind the demolition of the Shohondo and the subsequent erection on the same site of a new high sanctuary, the Hoando, was a necessary step in establishing a building based on correct orthodox faith in Nichiren Shoshu.

In contrast, the Soka Gakkai vehemently rejects these charges, claiming that it is Abe who has deviated from the doctrines of Nichiren Shoshu. It further alleges that Abe himself was personally corrupt and that his motive for excommunicating the Soka Gakkai was to bolster his personal power over believers. The Soka Gakkai leadership has been consistently scathing in its criticism of Abe in particular and the priesthood in general, claiming accusations of simony, sexual hedonism, monopolizing the Dai-Gohonzon, and claims based on the extant notes of a senior priest, Jitoku Kawabe (1929—2002), alleging that Abe was aware that the Dai-Gohonzon was not authentic.

== Later years ==
Abe was one of the few high priests in Nichiren Shoshu's history, after Nikko Shonin (1246-1333), to reach 80 years of age while actively serving in the position.

In the view of Hokkeko believers, Abe ensured that Nichiren Shoshu doctrine would be communicated to believers without reinterpretations of convenience. He also survived attempts against efforts from three breakaway groups, beginning with Kenshokai in 1974, followed by Shoshinkai in 1980, and ultimately by the Soka Gakkai, which was expelled in 1991. In later years Abe continued to participate in the Gokaihi ceremonies (direct audiences with the Dai-Gohonzon) in both November and April, the most important months in the Nichiren Shoshu calendar.

Abe died in his private residence in Nakamachi district of Setagaya ward in Tokyo on 20 September 2019, aged 96. His body was briefly exhibited in the Kyakuden for international believers and thereafter his cremated remains are interred in the Buddhist stupa no. 67 at the burial cemetery grounds of Taiseki-ji.

== Sources ==
- Japanese Wikipedia article on Shōshinkai
- Shoshū Hashaku Guide (Jp: 諸宗破折ガイド: Guide to refuting [erroneous teachings of] other schools). Taiseki-ji, 2003 (no ISBN)
- Nichiren Shoshu Fuji Nempyō (Jp: 日蓮正宗 富士年表: Chronology of the history of the Fuji Schools). Fuji Gakurin, 1990. (No ISBN)

Preceded by Nittatsu Hosoi	Nichiren Shoshu High Priest; 1978–2005	Succeeded by Nichinyo Hayase
