= Nittatsu Hosoi =

66th High Priest of Nichiren Shoshu

Nittatsu Hosoi 日 達 細 井
- Title: 66th High Priest

Personal life
- Born: 15 April 1902 Chuo, Tokyo
- Died: 22 June 1979 (aged 77) Fujinomiya City Hospital
- Children: Keido Hosoi (biological); Jiun (Nichiryu) Sugano (adopted)
- Education: Rissho University

Religious life
- Religion: Nichiren Shoshu Buddhism
- Ordination: 1910

Senior posting
- Based in: Taiseki-ji, Shizuoka Prefecture Japan
- Period in office: 15 November 1959 – 22 June 1979 (death)
- Predecessor: Nichijun Shonin
- Successor: Nikken Shonin
- Previous post: Chief priest, Jozaiji, Ikebukuro, Tokyo; Chief priest, Hondenji, Osaka

Nittatsu Hosoi (細 井 日 達, Hosoi Nittatsu also known as Nittatsu Shonin; 15 April 1902, Tokyo – 22 June 1979) was the 66th High Priest of the Nichiren Shoshu Head Temple Taisekiji in Fujinomiya, Shizuoka Prefecture, Japan. Previously, he served as chief priest at Hondenji temple in Osaka and Jozaiji temple in Ikebukuro, Tokyo.

Nittatsu expelled the Kenshokai and was the first High Priest to publicly criticize the Soka Gakkai for allegedly deviating from the traditionalist doctrines of Nichiren Shoshu. He later threatened its senior leaders to remove the Dai Gohonzon from their funded building, the Shohondo, later demolished by his successor Nikken Abe.

== History ==
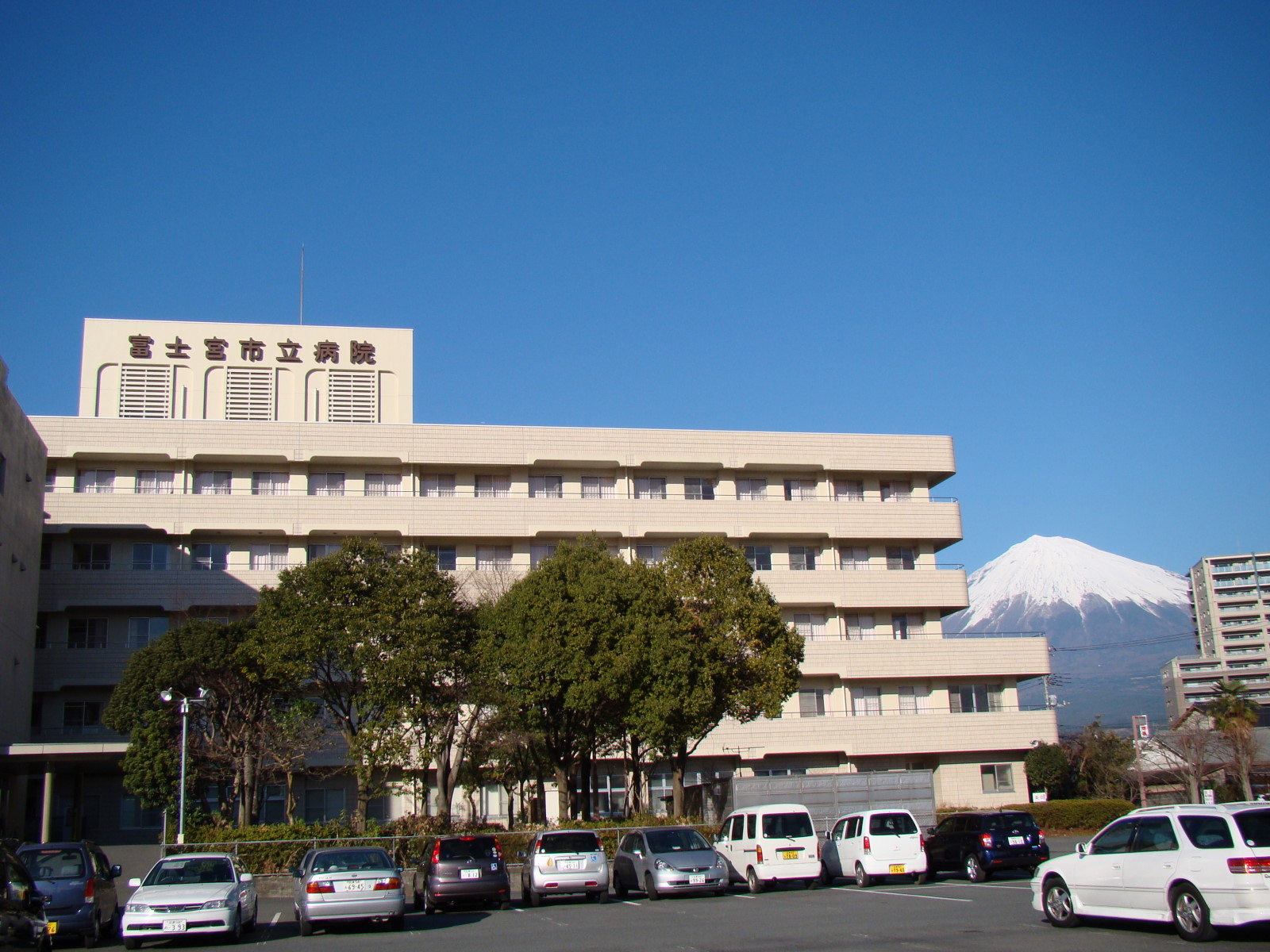
The Fujinomiya City General Hospital, where Nittatsu Shonin was admitted before his death.

Nittatsu Hosoi was born on 15 April 1902, in the Kyobashi neighborhood of Chuo, Tokyo, Japan and entered the Nichiren Shoshu priesthood in 1910 at eight years of age, training under 57th High Priest Nissho Shonin. In 1933, he adopted a newborn child whom he raised as his own. He was appointed chief priest of Hondenji temple in Osaka in 1936. In 1939, his first biological son was born.

Hosoi eventually became the chief priest of Jozai-ji Temple in 1941. He became a senior member of the school's study department in 1946 and became its general director in 1956. He became the high priest of Nichiren Shoshu in 1959. On 22 June 1979 at 5:00 pm, he died aged 77 of chronic heart disease at the Fujinomiya City General Hospital and was succeeded by Nikken Abe.

== Legacy as High Priest ==
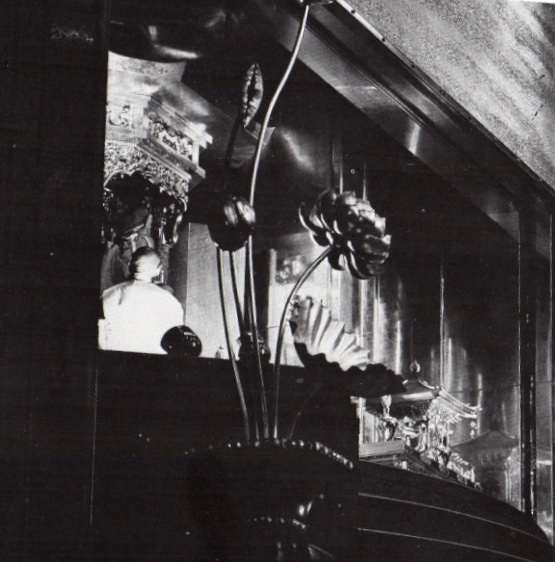
The 66th High Priest Nittatsu Shonin cleaning the dust on the Dai Gohonzon mandala. Assistant priest is general director Nichiji Hayase. The O-mushibarai ceremony inside the Hoanden building. Dated April 1969.

Nittatsu Shonin's tenure as high priest was mostly known for the restoration and repairing of the private buildings within Taisekiji Head Temple. He collaborated with Soka Gakkai President Jōsei Toda during his last years, and saw the expansion of Soka Gakkai during his years as high priest. He lived through the construction of the Shohondo building, later demolished by his successor Nikken Abe. Nittatsu Shonin also publicly criticized the plan of Soka Gakkai to oversee the bookkeeping practices proposed by Soka Gakkai President Daisaku Ikeda and vowed to remove the venerated Dai Gohonzon from the Shohondo building if Soka Gakkai persisted in its efforts to exercise control over temple affairs without the priesthood's consent.

In 1974, Nittatsu Shonin strongly rebuked a claim circulating among Soka Gakkai groups that a new Buddha had appeared:

"I have heard recently that within a certain (Soka Gakkai) group, there is a lot of talk about a new true Buddha appearing. If the report I received is accurate, the people making such claims are not practicing Nichiren Shoshu and can no longer be called Nichiren Shoshu believers. If there are people who teach such an erroneous doctrine, I would like Hokkeko believers to stop them by all means. Please understand that this is the Hokkeko's mission." — (High Priest audience for the Hokkeko Federation Spring Season General Tozan, 25 April 1974)

The Tokohibo building within the Head Temple Taisekiji, where American and European Hokkeko believers stay during their personal Tozan pilgrimages, is one of the best known buildings constructed during Nittatsu Shonin's tenure. He had the Joraibo building, finished in 1972, constructed. He also restored the buildings of Okyozo, the repository of Buddhist texts kept in Taisekiji, the oldest collections dating back from the Ming Dynasty as well as the "Ohanamizu" (English: Flower-Water) and "Akado" (English: Spring Water of Benefit/Fortune) where a spring is drawn to offer water for the Dai Gohonzon and all the other Gohonzons in the temple. Furthermore, he also started an expansion of the Ever-chanting Temple (Joshodo) of Taisekiji where 24-hour chanting is observed. This was completed by the 67th High Priest, Nikken Shonin.

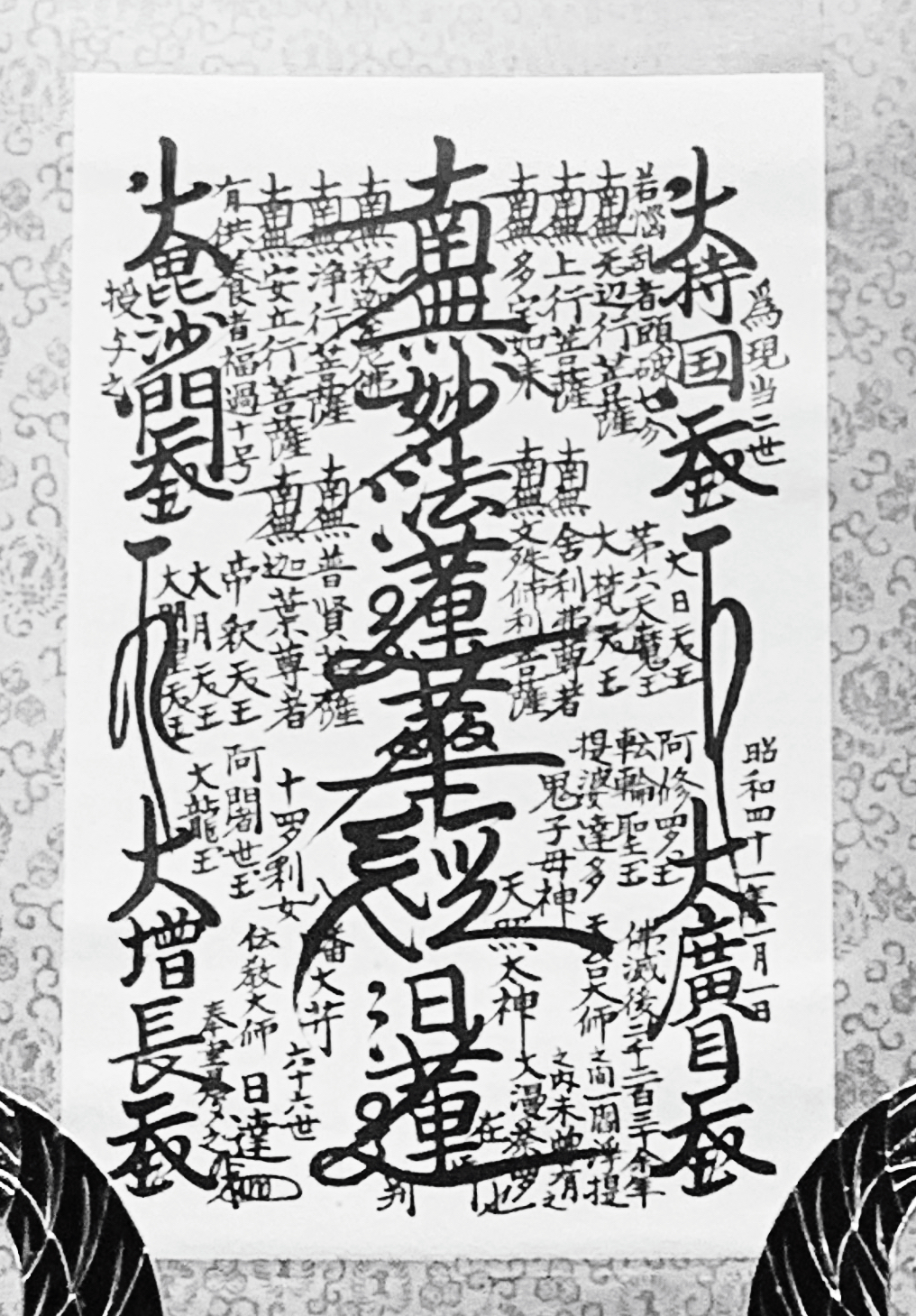
A copy of the Dai Gohonzon mandala as transcribed by Nittatsu Hosoi on 1 January 1966.

Nittatsu Shonin's transcription of the Dai Gohonzon image is notable for its clear print calligraphy and was issued on 1 January 1966 for woodblock dissemination. He was also instrumental in the lawsuit brought by the Kenshokai group, led by Shoei Asai, who accused Soka Gakkai senior leaders of allegedly forcing Nittatsu Shonin to publicly declare the Shohondo building as the permanent sanctuary of the Dai Gohonzon as petitioned by Soka Gakkai President Daisaku Ikeda despite the Emperor Showa's not having made the Gojukai Buddhist conversion vow, which Kenshokai considered an absolute prerequisite for such a declaration.

As high priest, Nittatsu Shonin affirmed the confiscation of the seven wooden Gohonzons reproduced by the Soka Gakkai, resulting in a public apology on 8 November 1978 by Soka Gakkai president Daisaku Ikeda via Vice President Takehisa Tsuji, who published the following:

"The Head Temple Taisekiji is the fundamental place for Buddhist practice. Our faith does not exist apart from the Dai-Gohonzon of the High Sanctuary. Receiving strict guidance from the High Priest (Nittatsu Shonin), the Gohonzons that were carelessly engraved and reproduced were placed in the Hoanden (building)." — (Seikyo Shimbun SGI magazine, 8 November 1978.)

Ultimately, the formal apology of Soka Gakkai President Daisaku Ikeda was published in the Dai-Nichiren manuscript released by the Head Temple in 1978:

"On this occasion, as the one who holds the position of So-koto (highest lay leader), I deeply apologize for these mistakes. — Daisaku Ikeda, SGI President." — Dai Nichiren publication, December 1978 edition. Pages 44-45. )

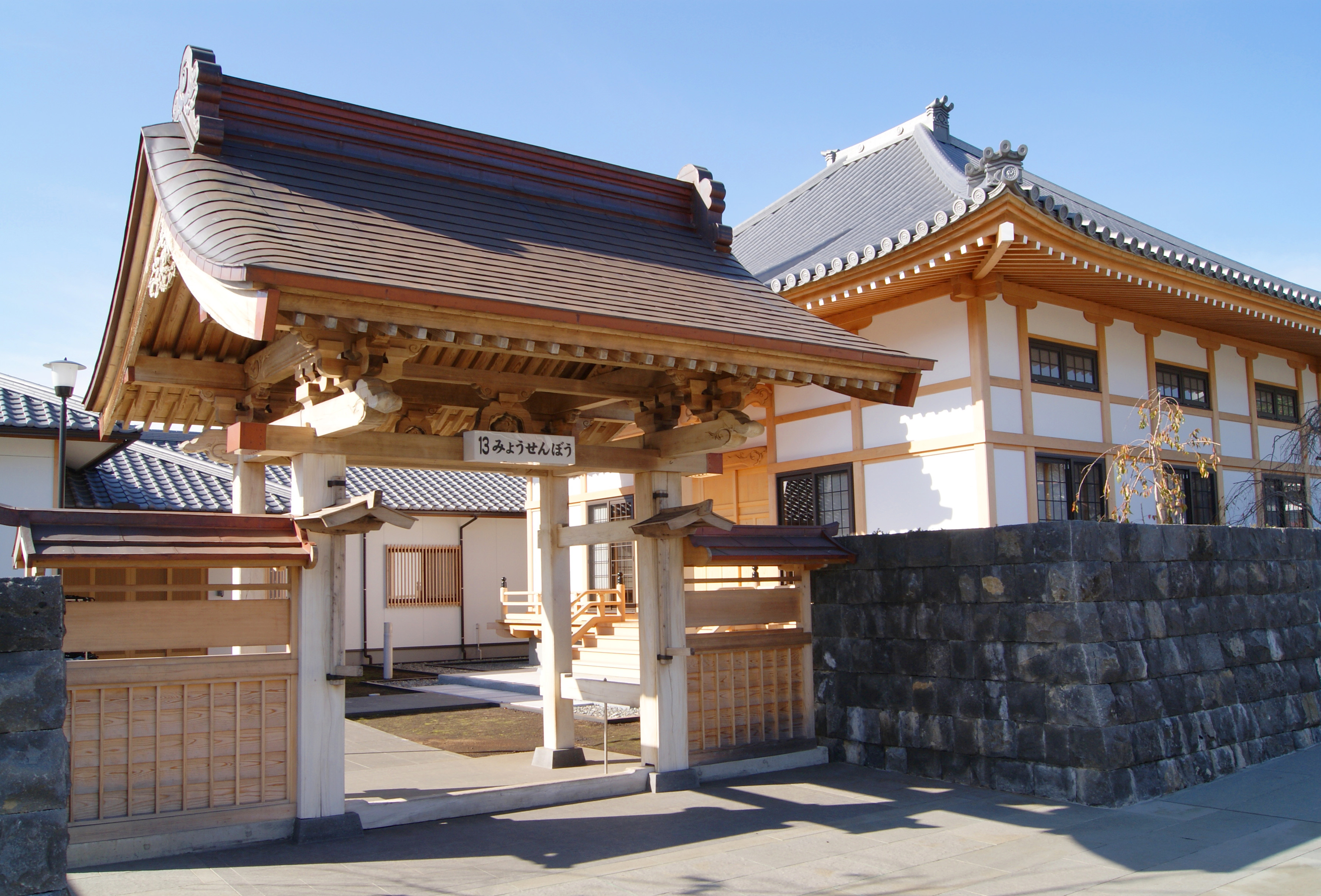
The main entrance to the Myozenbo temple complex, built by Nittatsu Shonin in August 1969.

Just before his death in 1979, Nittatsu Shonin gave one of his final audiences rebuking the Soka Gakkai for allegedly deviating from its core doctrines, publicly stating the following at the 18th annual Myokankai audience of believers:

"We, (Nichiren Shoshu) priests, have never had any intention to destroy the Soka Gakkai or to do anything in particular about the organization, but for some time now, the Soka Gakkai has been mistaken about the teachings of Nichiren Shoshu and their deviations are becoming more serious. We point this out because we want the Soka Gakkai to somehow correct their mistakes and once again stand up based upon their old sincere faith. It is true that for many years, the Soka Gakkai believers have dedicated themselves to supporting the priesthood. Their contribution has been significant. Even with such a great contribution, however, if they are mistaken about the Nichiren Shoshu teachings and deviate from them, it will mean all their efforts will come to mean nothing." — (The 18th Annual Meeting of Myoukankai believers, 31 March 1979.)

After his death, among Nichiren Shoshu believers Nittatsu was remembered as the "smiling High Priest" for his pleasant demeanor in photos. For a while, the Shoshinkai, a breakaway group of priests who refused to acknowledge the authority of Nikken Shonin as Nittatsu Shonin's successor, had a few Gohonzons transcribed by Nittatsu Shonin that they used for producing copies for about ten years, but they later ceased because of copyright lawsuits pursued by the Head Temple.

Today, a wooden Gohonzon inscribed by Nittatsu Shonin in 1967 is enshrined in the minor hall of Nichiren Shoshu Myohoji Temple in Los Angeles and another in the Grand Hodo-in temple in Nichiren Shoshu main headquarters in Tokyo, Japan.

Another Gohonzon transcribed by him is the wooden Gohonzon enshrined at the Gokokuji Temple in Kamakura city in Kanagawa Prefecture which was transcribed into wood on 12 September 1968, then formally enshrined at this temple three years later on the 12 September 1971 for the 700th anniversary of Nichiren being nearly executed at Shichirigahama beach.

At the main Head Temple of its sect also enshrines at the Tendei-in Cemetery Office of Taisekiji, dated to 12 January 1969. Nittatsu's cremated remains are housed in a Buddhist stupa (No. 66) in the High Priests section of cemetery at Taiseki-ji temple.
