= Dai Gohonzon =

Main object of veneration in Nichiren Shoshu Buddhism

The Dai Gohonzon of the High Sanctuary of the Essential Teachings
- 大御本尊 (Japanese), Dai Gohonzon (English)
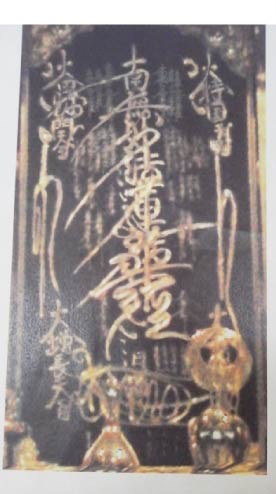
- Medium: Woodcarving half-log of Japanese camphorwood
- Subject: The image as enshrined inside the Hoando storagehouse.
- Dimensions: 143.5 cm × 65.02 cm (56.5 in × 25.60 in)
- Location: Taiseki-ji Temple complex, Hoando storage house, Fujinomiya, Japan

The Dai Gohonzon of the High Sanctuary of the Essential Teachings, commonly known as the Dai Gohonzon (Japanese: 大 御 本 尊 The Supreme (Great) Gohonzon or Honmon—Kaidan—no—Dai—Gohonzon, Japanese: 本 門 戒 壇 の 大 御 本 尊) is a venerated mandala image inscribed with both Sanskrit and Chinese logographs on a median log trunk of Japanese camphorwood.

The image is worshipped in Nichiren Shoshu Buddhism, which claims to possess within both the Dharma teachings and Tamashi of Nichiren as inscribed by him on wood, then carved by his artisan disciple Izumi Ajari Nippo.

The image was first explicitly mentioned in the last will and testament of Nikko Shonin for his designated successor Nichimoku, annually displayed every April 6 or 7 during the Goreiho O-mushibarai Daiho-e ceremony (English: The Airing of Sacred Treasures; 御霊宝虫払大法会) at the Head Temple.

== Description ==
The venerated mandala has the following inscriptions on the right lower portion of the image:

- "Honmon-no-Kaidan" (本門戒壇)
- "Ganshu Ya-shiro Kuni-shige" (願主弥四郎国重)
- "Hokke-shura Keihaku" (法華講衆等敬白)

English Translation: "…Mr. Yashiro Kunishige is (now) applying for ordination platform of the High Sanctuary of Essential Teachings through this (Image) of the Lotus believers."

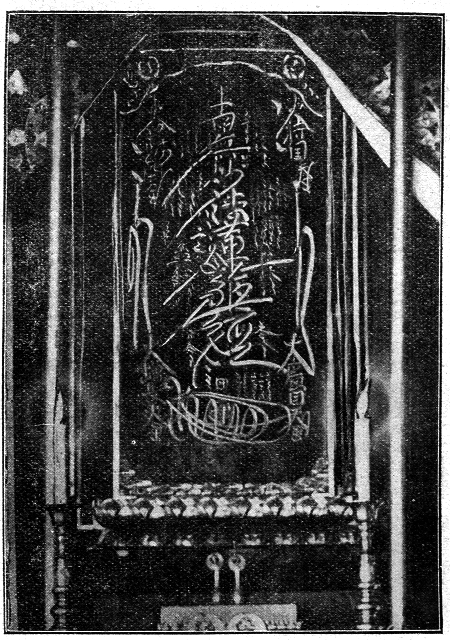
Photograph of the Dai Gohonzon at Taisekiji, printed in Kumada Ijō's (熊田葦城) book Nichiren Shōnin (日蓮上人), 8th edition, page 375, originally published in 1911.

This Gohonzon is also sometimes venerated as "Ichien-Bodai-Soyo Gohonzon" which refers to its bestowal to the world. Various theories continue to speculate the true identity of "Yashiro Kunishige." The High Priest Nittatsu Shonin once remarked the vague possibility that "Ya-shiro" refers to "Jin-shiro", the older brother of Yaroguro, one the three martyred disciples in 1279.

The Dai Gohonzon image is transcribed by the living incumbent who serves as High Priest of the sect (Hossu). As High Priest, this permits the rendition of the mandala to range from being fully transcribed or abbreviated or to add and subtract whatever is deemed appropriate into the Gohonzon. There are two recognized forms of a transcription of the Dai-Gohonzon:

1. Moji Mandala — (Transcribed on paper)
2. Ita Gohonzon — (Transcription on wooden board)

The application for transcribing the Dai Gohonzon image is found in five forms:

1. Joju Gohonzon — oftentimes granted to designated temples, propagation buildings and personalities who have directly served and protected the Dai Gohonzon over the centuries.
2. Okatagi Gohonzon — a woodblocking printed rendition that is loaned to general membership of the sect, usually framed in an ornamental scroll.
3. Tokubetsu "Special" Okatagi Gohonzon — A larger size on a silk frame that is sometimes granted to highly commendable members on the sole discretion of a temple Chief Priest.
4. Doshi Gohonzon — a special funeral paper Gohonzon that is portably used in religious ceremonies where a memorial remembrance is held. It oftentimes bears two extraordinary deities, the King Yenma and the "Godomyokan" (The infernal officials who assist King Yenma from the Five Lower Worlds). The 26th High Priest Nichikan Shonin transcribed Gohonzons in this manner, which has also since been customary for future High Priests to emulate.
5. Omamori Gohonzon — a miniature paper Gohonzon in abbreviated format designated for traveling practitioners. This Gohonzon is typically sealed in a protective display case.

== Mythos ==
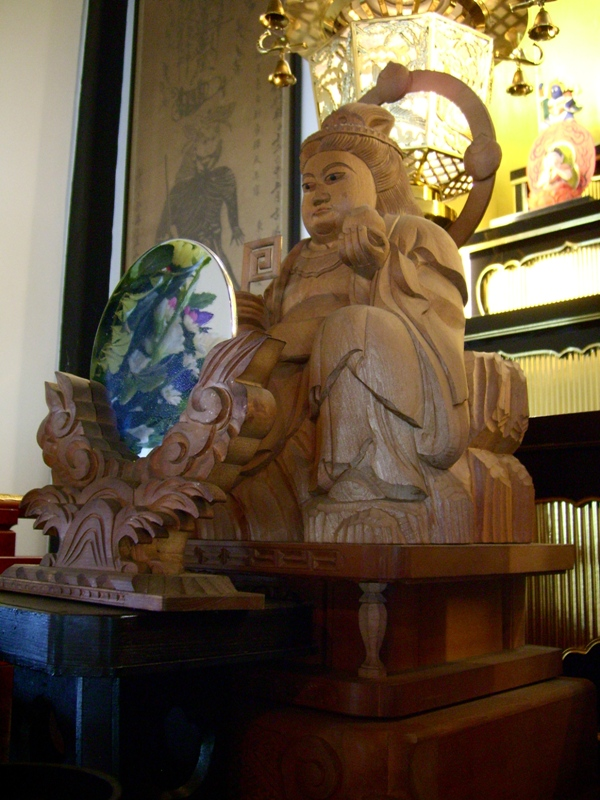
A camphorwood statue of Shichimen Tennyo enshrined at Honkoji Temple in Ichikawa city in Chiba prefecture, with a Shinto mirror as part of her legend and mixed religious practice by the Nichiren Shu sect.

According to the doctrines of Nichiren Shoshu based on the Gosho writing Jogyo-Shu-den-Sho, Nippo underwent immense fasting and prayer to the dragon goddess Shichimen, the patroness of Yamanashi prefecture. The goddess, owing her enlightenment to Nichiren, answered his prayer by sending a log in a nearby river. The Dai Gohonzon image was inscribed on a wood log procured from the water goddess by Nippo Shonin, one of his junior disciples. Recounted in the legend:

"Nippo (disciple) wanted to carve a statue of Nichiren. He then prayed to (Goddess) Shichimen Dai-myo-jin. Was it an answer (Kannu) to his prayers? He found a log floating in the (river).

Once stored in the Kuon-ji temple in Yamanashi Prefecture, the image was later confiscated by Nikko Shonin, who designated his strongest disciple, Hyakken-bo to carry the image on his backside through the forest into the Taisekiji complex, where it remains today. Additionally, the statue of Nichiren carved by Nippo from the leftover remains of the original Camphorwood log is stored in a stupa next to the Dai-Gohonzon in the Hoando at Taisekiji.

== Account tales of persecution ==
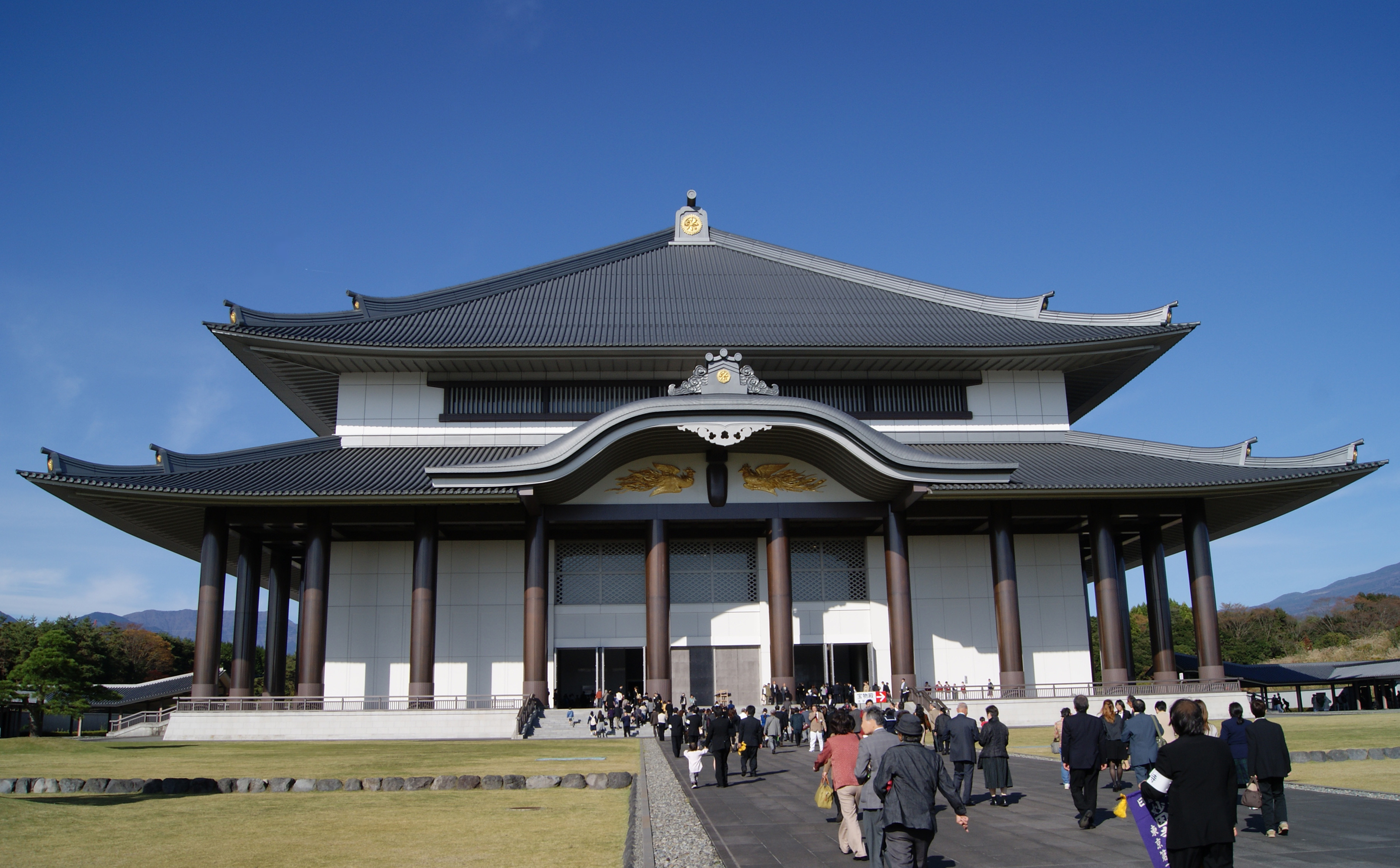
The Hoando storagehouse building in Taisekiji, where the Dai Gohonzon is currently enshrined.

The Fuji School Branch refers to the Nichiren Buddhist denominations stemming from Nichiren's disciple Nikko Shonin.

The Fuji Branch believes that in the autumn of 1279, a number of Nichiren's laypeople in the Fuji District were targeted by Gyōchi

The Nichiren Shoshu sect claims the following regarding the Dai Gohonzon's nature and purpose:

- That Nichiren Daishonin decided to inscribe the Dai Gohonzon as a result of these persecuting events. Furthermore, it taught as a doctrine that this served his purpose in entering the sahā world, (出世の本懐, Shusse—no—Honkai). On 12 October 1279, he inscribed the Gohonzon known as the "Dai Gohonzon," which – in contrast to other Gohonzon inscribed in this period – is intended for worship by all his disciples and believers, contemporary and future, rather than just the specific individual named on it. Furthermore, only the Sovereign of Japan can enshrine the image in its permanent Temple when widespread propagation of the religion is accomplished.
- The sect teaches that due to the Kamakura Shogunate refusing to heed Nichiren's prophecies on natural disasters and incoming foreign invasion, the Buddhist deities had begun to abandon Japan in its natural environment, claiming the result of arson at the Tsurugaoka Hachimangū Shrine on 14 November 1280, approximately one year after the inscription of the Dai Gohonzon image.
- The sect further teaches that the returning Karma punishment from the Dai Gohonzon was imposed on the police officer " Hei no Saemon-no-jō Yoritsuna" on 29 May 1293, fourteen years after murdering three of the first Hokkeko believers during the "Atsuhara Persecutions" in Suruga province. These mystical punishments included their political defeat and joint—suicide of his younger son Tametsuna Iinuma (Sukemune) and eldest son Munetsuna Nagasaki who was expelled and died in Sado island (via suicide into the sea according to pious legends).

== Claims of origin ==
Nichiren Shōshū adherents cite the following passage in Nichiren's "On Persecutions Befalling the Sage" addressed to the Buddhist Samurai warrior Shijo Nakatsukasa Saburō Saemon—no—jō Yorimoto (四条中務三郎左衛門尉頼基, 1230–1296), which they assert supports the origin story of the image: "...Shakyamuni Buddha fulfilled the purpose of his advent in a little over 40 years, — the Great Teacher Zhiyi took about 30 years — and the Great Teacher Saichō, some 20 years. I have spoken repeatedly of the indescribable persecutions they suffered during those years. For myself, Nichiren, it took 27 years, and the great persecutions I faced during this period are well known to you all."

Nikko Shonin's last will and testament document to Nichimoku Shonin, "Articles to be Observed After the Passing of Nikko" ("Nikko ato jojo no koto"), states "...The Dai-Gohonzon of the second year of Kō`an (1279), which Nikko inherited, is hereby bequeathed to Nichimoku." Two original transfer documents exist written by Nikko Shonin. Of the two, the first document is a draft written in the second year of Gentoku (1330). The second is the actual transfer document itself, dated the first year of Shoukei (1332). Both documents are signed by Nikko Shonin. The signatures on these documents have been determined to be consistent with Nikko Shonin's signature from the period in his life.

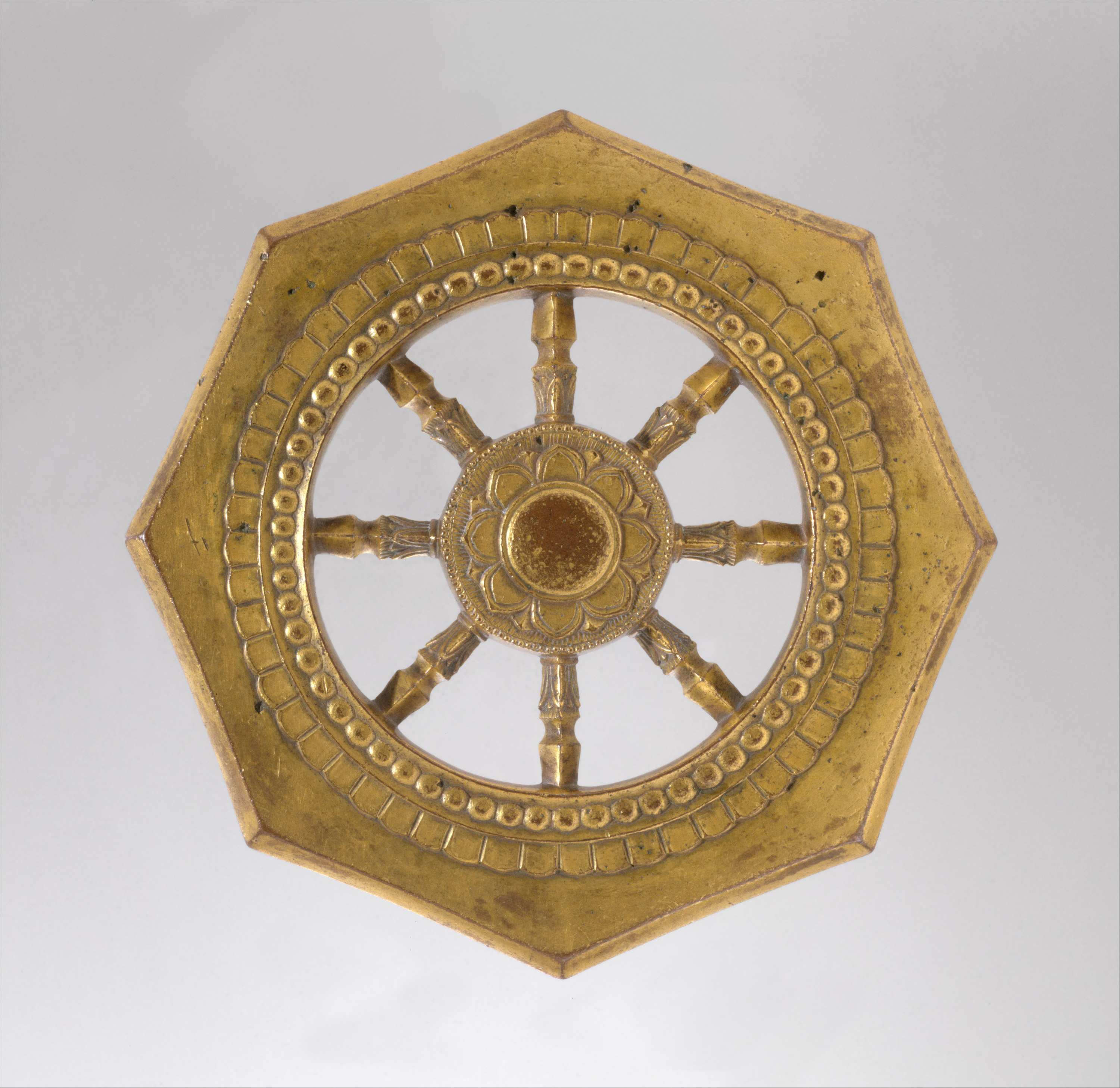
The Dharmachakra, (Japanese: 輪宝, "Rinpo") sometimes called "Treasure Wheel" is used by the Nichiren Shoshu sect as the symbol of the Dai Gohonzon mandala on its altar.

Additionally, the third High Priest, Nichimoku Shonin, stated "...The Dai-Gohonzon, which was entrusted upon the person of Nikko, is the plank Gohonzon. It is now here at this temple (Taisekiji)." From documents written by Nikko Shonin and Nichimoku Shonin, the Dai-Gohonzon was transferred between the successive high priests of Nichiren Shoshu. The fourteenth High Priest, Nisshu Shonin, stated in his writing "On Articles to Be Observed after the Passing of Nikko" ("Nikko ato jojo no koto jisho"), "...The Gohonzon concerns the transfer matters of Taiseki-ji, which denotes the exclusive transfer from one high priest to another. The Dai Gohonzon of the High Sanctuary of the Essential Teaching, which Nikko Shonin inherited from the Daishonin and transferred to Nichimoku Shonin in the era of Shoan, is exactly and changelessly the whole entity of the transfer through the Nichiren–Nikko–Nichimoku lineage in the Latter Day of the Law."

The 26th High Priest, Nichikan Shonin, declared in his treatise "Exegesis on the True Object of Worship" ("Kanjin no honzon-sho mondan") the following regarding the image: "...The Gohonzon of the High Sanctuary of the Essential Teaching, inscribed in the second year of Koan (1279), is the ultimate, the absolute, and the final cause of the Daishonin's advent. It is the greatest among the Three Great Secret Laws and the supreme object of worship in the entire world." Due to this charge of protecting the image, 59th High Priest Nichiko Hori declared the following regarding the matter: "In the early times, this matter (the Dai-Gohonzon) was not publicized within our school nor outside."

== Claims of forgery ==
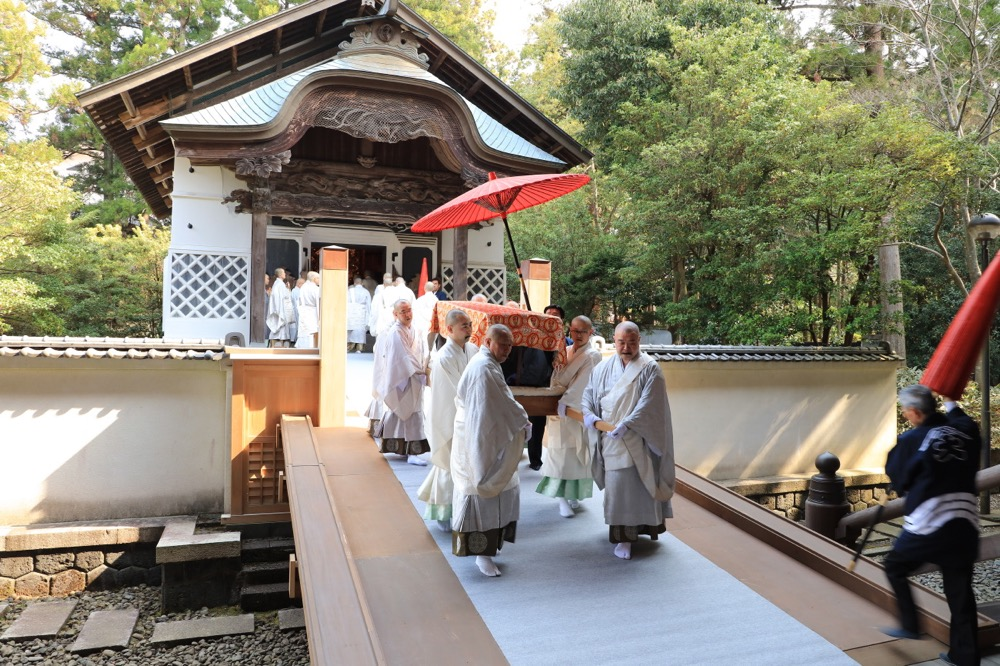
The translation of the Dai Gohonzon image from the Gohozo Treasure House into the new Hoando building in 2002. Head Temple Taisekiji, Kamijo route, Shizuoka prefecture, Japan.

=== Fraudulent pious invention ===
Furthermore, such sects maintain that Nichiren never meant to permanently enshrine Buddhist Mandalas in a written format, but intended to permit both written form and Buddhist statues in the Gohonzon arrangement after his own demise. Owing to the scarcity of financial sources during Nichiren's own lifetime, they dismiss the claim of a Dai-Gohonzon's purpose and exclusive privilege to the present time.

=== Possible reproductions and textual comparisons ===
Researchers associated with the Nichiren Mandala Study Workshop have noted discrepancies among historical transcriptions and recorded measurements of the Dai Gohonzon. Surviving records from 1600, 1764 and 1911 give different dimensions, and some early transcriptions also include inscriptions that are absent from the present wooden mandala. These differences have been discussed in relation to repeated fires at Taiseki-ji and the possibility that the present Dai Gohonzon may be a later reproduction of an earlier wooden mandala. The study does not claim that four distinct Dai Gohonzons can be conclusively identified, nor that the present Dai Gohonzon was created by the 67th High Priest Nikken Shonin. Rather, it notes that the current mandala was placed in a newly made wooden casing when it was enshrined in the Hōandō in 2002; a commemorative plaque records that this work was commissioned by the 67th abbot Nikken. The study further discusses the possibility, based on earlier research by Kawasaki Hiroshi, that the present wooden mandala may date from around 1865 following a major fire at Taiseki-ji.

The study also compares the Dai Gohonzon with a mandala inscribed by Nichiren and bestowed upon Shōsuke-bō Nichizen (日禅), a disciple of Nikkō, on 8 May 1280. It proposes that the Dai Gohonzon may have been produced through a composite process in which the central inscription was copied or traced from this Nichizen mandala. The comparison notes that the central inscriptions are nearly identical in layout and measure approximately the same height, while other elements of the Dai Gohonzon appear to derive from different sources. The article does not identify this mandala as a work by Nichizon (日尊), nor does it state that the Dai Gohonzon was based on a later mandala authored by him. Two related versions of the Nichizen mandala are preserved at Taiseki-ji and Kitayama Honmon-ji, with the Taiseki-ji version generally regarded as the original and the Kitayama version as a copy.

=== Falsified dating strata and amalgamation ===
In addition, some researchers state that the Dai Gohonzon image is fake and not consistent with any other Gohonzon that Nichiren inscribed in 1279. Instead, they claim the scholarly calligraphy style of the Dai Gohonzon is more accurately dated to 8 May 1280, instead of 12 October 1279. Accordingly, a 19th-century calligraphy scholar and priest Kaiso Inada (稲田海素, 1 November 1869 — 26 February 1956), was a colleague of the Nichiren Shoshu 59th High Priest Nichiko Shonin. The priest Inada had recorded that he was granted lodging at Taiseki-ji and was able to examine the Dai Gohonzon image and other Nichiren mandalas stored within the Head Temple. He concluded that the Dai Gohonzon stored at Taiseki-ji was created using different sheets traced from at least two other Nichiren mandalas. His Colleague Hori Nichiko Shonin strongly disagreed with his conclusion, and dealt very critically with claims against the authenticity of the Dai-Gohonzon.

== Parallel legends ==
The first Kamakura Shogun of Japan, Lord Minamoto no Yoritomo (1147—1199), who pardoned Taira no Morihisa after claiming to share his vision of the alleged miraculous incident.

A celebrated Samurai warrior named Taira no Morihisa allegedly experienced the same miraculous events similar to the execution of Nichiren at Shichirigahama beach prior to inscribing the Dai Gohonzon mandala eighty-six years earlier. In year 1193 (Kenkyu Year), Morihisa was a surviving warrior that was defeated by the Genji clan after the Genpei War. On the way to Kamakura, he claimed to have received a dream from the Buddhist deities instructing him to recite the Lotus Sutra for salvation. He held on to reading a copy of the Chapter 25 of the Lotus Sutra dedicated to the goddess Kanzeon. As the executioner prepared to behead him, a great light allegedly appeared from the Sutra scroll which blinded his eyesight and destroyed the executioners sword.

== Dai-Gohonzon replicas ==
The general sentiment among these sects is that neither Nichiren nor his disciple Nikko Shonin ever specified a particular special mandala as the singular object of worship nor to be granted the national title of "Honmonji", a claim that the Taisekiji temple claims as their sole inherited right via the successorship of Nikko Shonin and possession of their mandala.

- The Kitayama Honmonji temple of Nichiren Shu sect — Located in Omosu, Suruga Province of Japan, claims another Dai Gohonzon inscribed by Nichiren. This temple claims to be the grave site of Nikkō Shōnin, whom they regard as their own temple founder.
- The Fujisan Honmon Shoshu sect — In Kamakura city in Kanagawa Prefecture there also claims possession of a Dai Gohonzon inscribed by Nichiren, which they refer to as the Dai-Honzon, enshrined at Hota Myohonji Temple. This mandala carries the inscription of The Great Object of Worship to Save and Protect for Ten Thousand Years and carries a signature of Jogyo Nichiren.
- The Soka Gakkai International — a modern lay Buddhist organization formerly affiliated with the Taisekiji Head Temple possesses a 1974 wooden copy as transcribed by the 64th Nichiren Shoshu High Priest Nissho Shonin, then carved by Japanese artisan Takeshi Akazawa. Originally enshrined at the Soka Gakkai building in Osaka, that Gohonzon is now enshrined within "The Hall of the Great Vow for Kosen-rufu" (広 宣 流 布 大 誓 堂, Kosen—Rufu Dai—Sei—Do) in Shinanomachi, Shinjuku, Tokyo. The decision came after its longstanding claim to religious independence after splitting with the Nichiren Shoshu sect in 1991, followed by the revision of the Soka Gakkai constitution on 8 November 2014, by which Soka Gakkai President Minoru Harada declared that the original mandala in Taisekiji temple is not their "Object of Worship". The entry for the Dai Gohonzon image was removed from the "SGI Dictionary of Buddhism" in 2010. Some progressive modernist factions within Soka Gakkai maintain that the original image at Taisekiji Head Temple is fake and was manufactured by the Nichiren Shoshu priesthood.

== Gallery of transcriptions ==
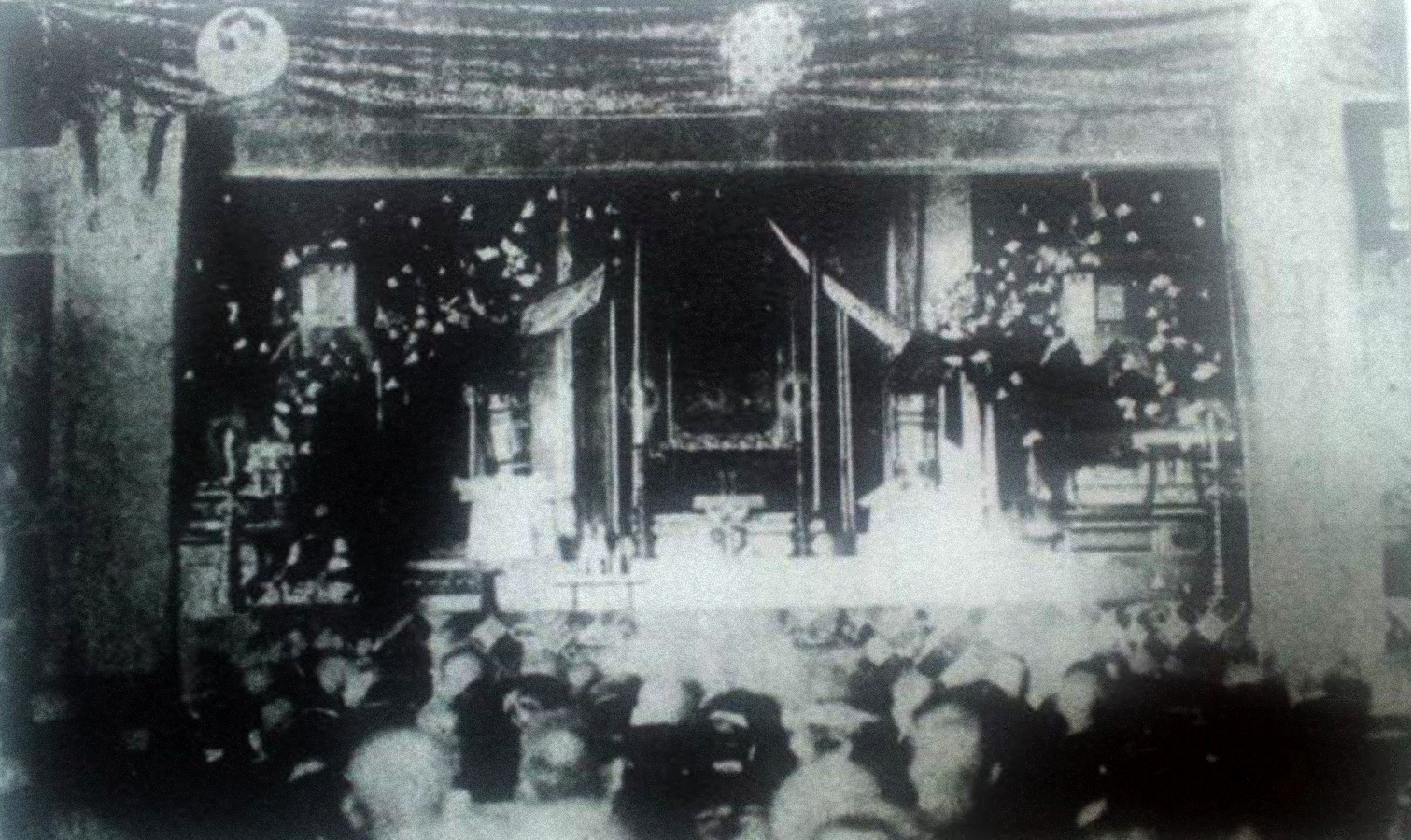
An obscure photo of the enshrined Dai Gohonzon in the Go-ho-zo Kaidan building in Taisekiji. Photo by Kokichi Yui. Circa 1915.

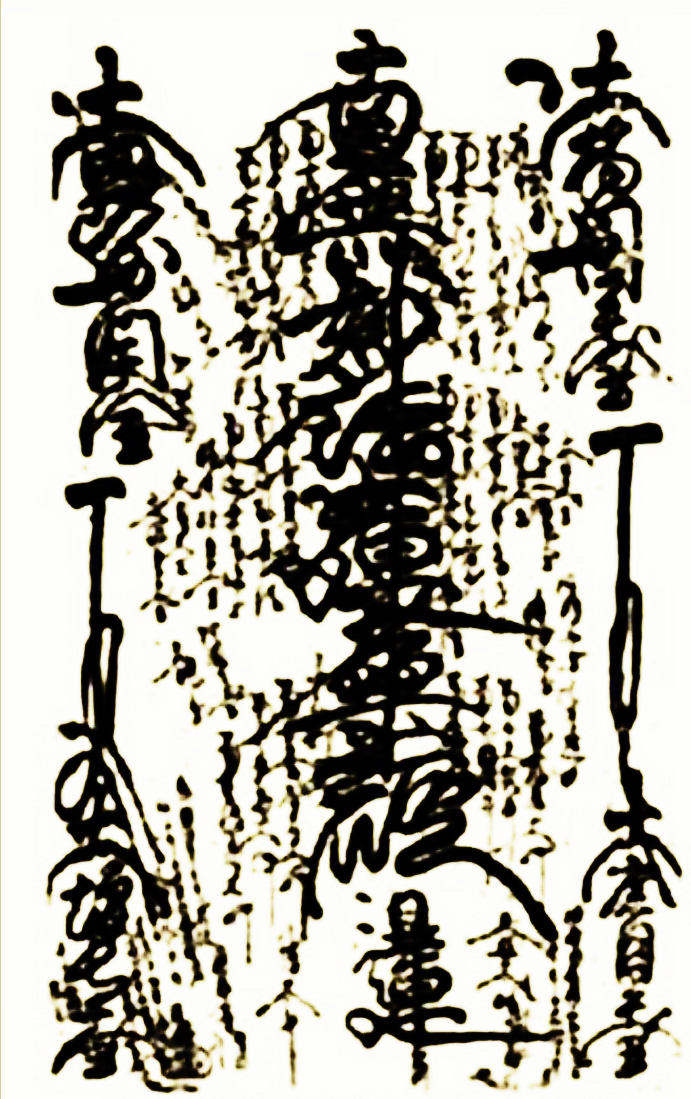
A Gohonzon Mandala transcribed by Nikko Shonin, the 2nd High Priest of Nichiren Shoshu.

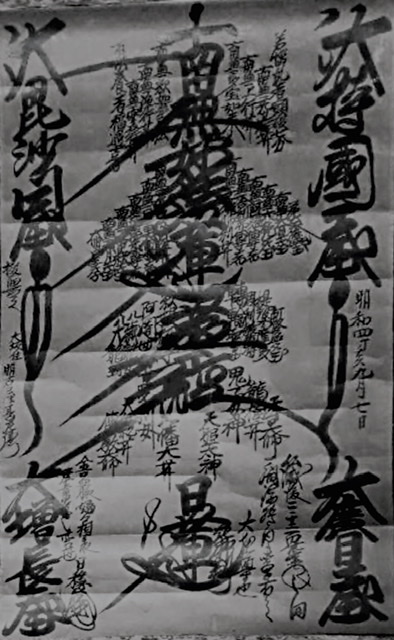
A transcribed copy of the Dai Gohonzon by the 35th High Priest of the Head Temple, Nichi-on Shonin from the year 1765.

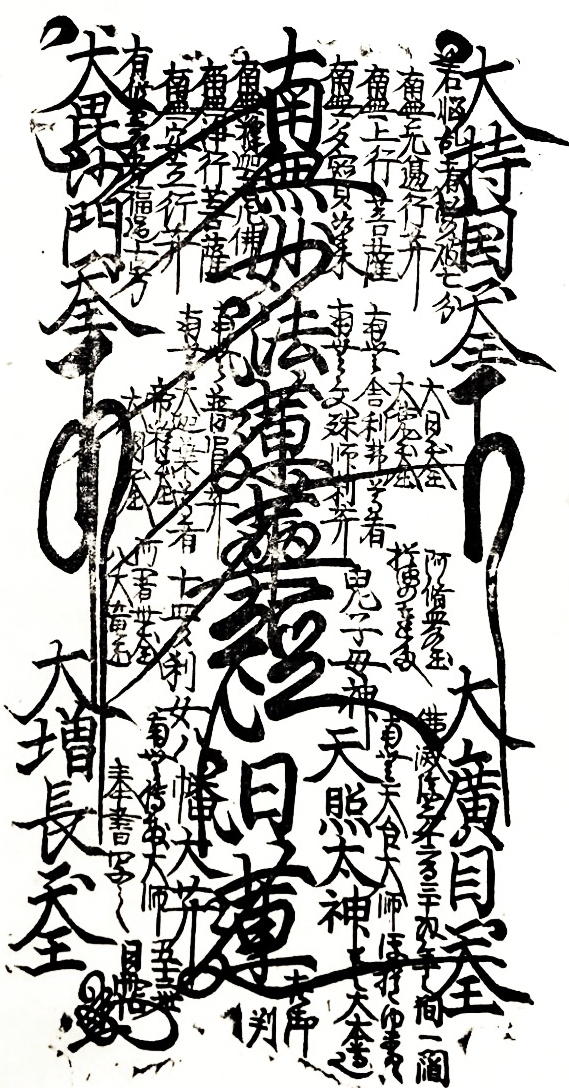
A Gohonzon Mandala transcribed by Nichiden Shonin, the 52nd High Priest of Nichiren Shoshu.

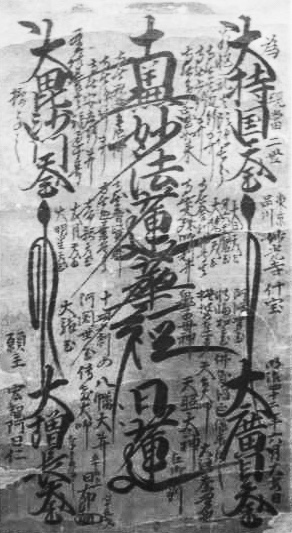
A Gohonzon Mandala transcribed by Nippu Shonin, the 55th High Priest of Nichiren Shoshu.

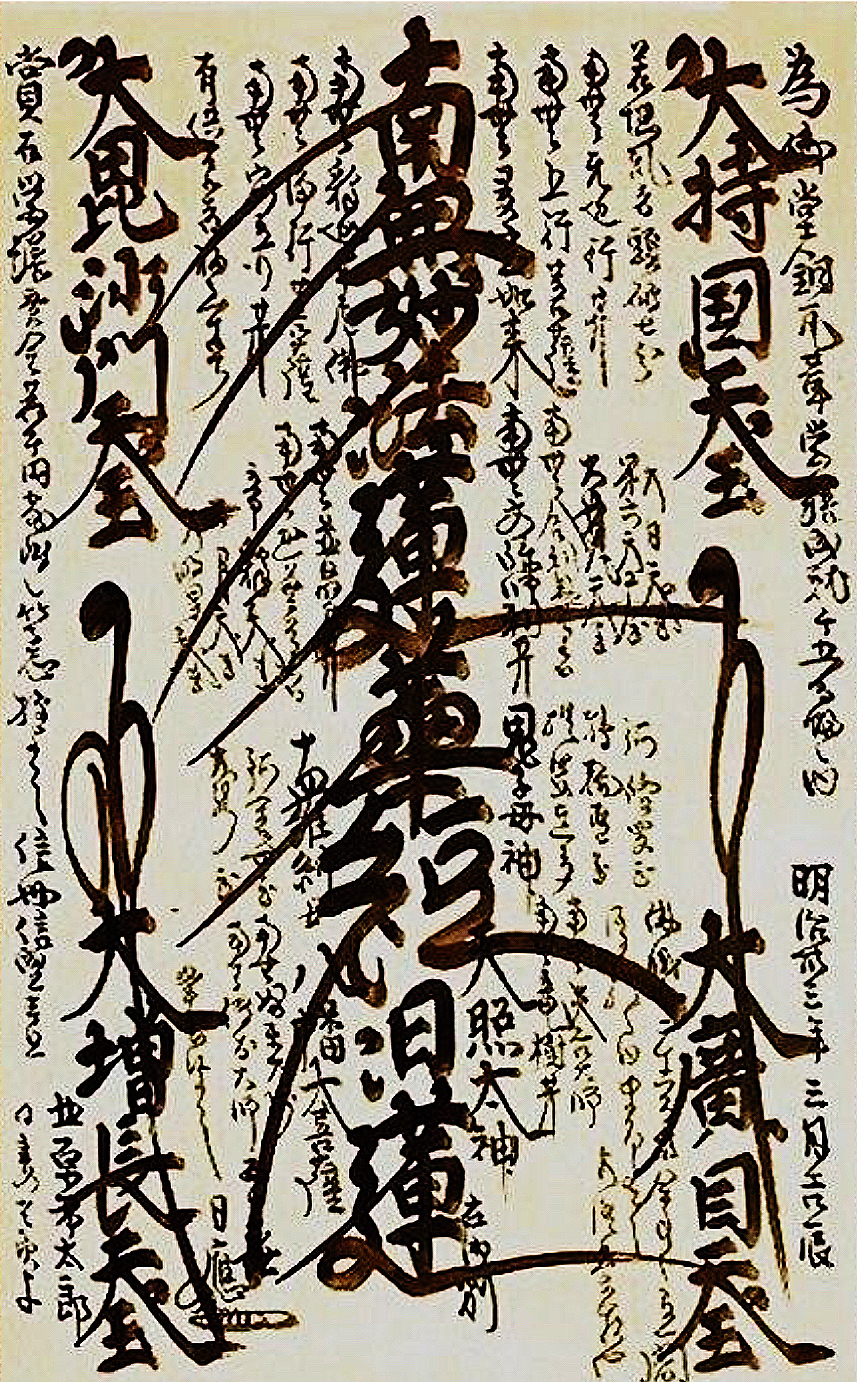
A Gohonzon Mandala transcribed by Nichi-O Shonin, the 56th High Priest of Nichiren Shoshu, founder of the Grand Hodo-in Temple in Tokyo and the ancestral grandfather of 68th High Priest Nichi—Nyo Shonin.

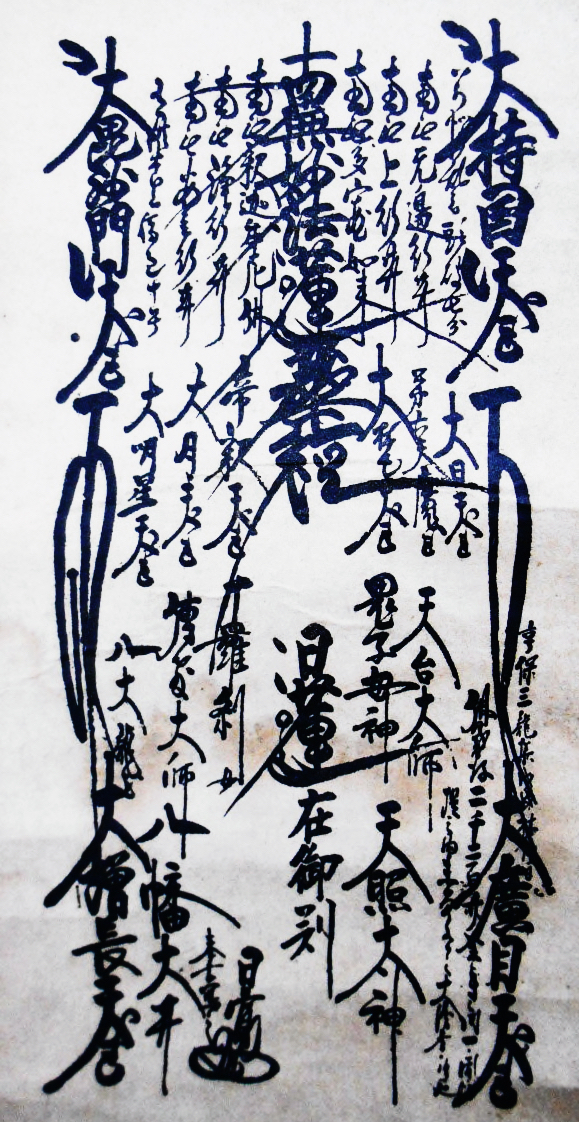
A Gohonzon Mandala of year 1718 as transcribed by Nichikan Shonin, the 26th High Priest of Nichiren Shoshu, authorized by 60th High Priest Nichikai Shonin in 1942. Currently enlarged and reproduced by Kenshokai organization.

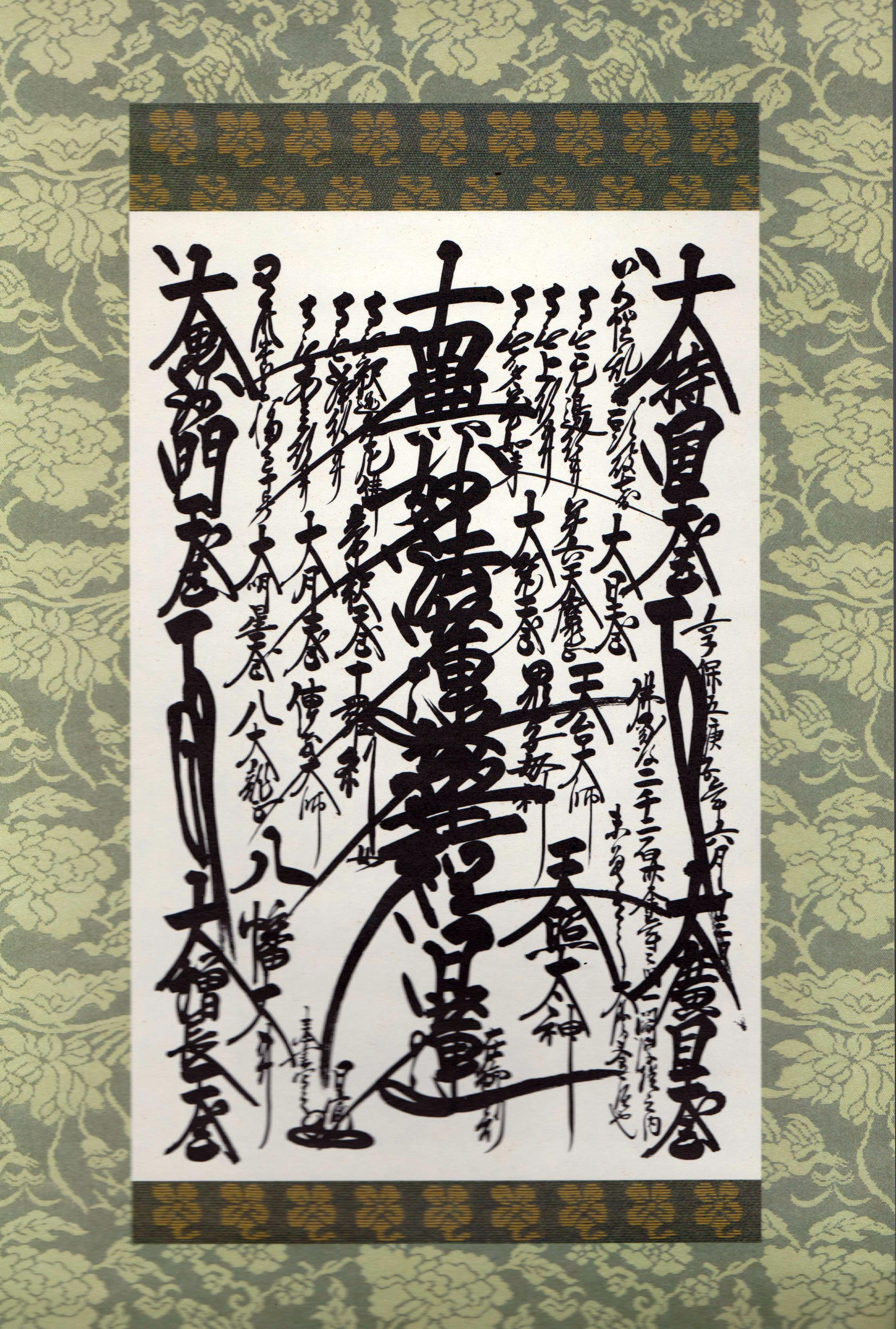
A Gohonzon Mandala transcribed on 13 July 1720 by Nichikan Shonin, 26th High Priest of Nichiren Shoshu. Sequestered by a dissident Nichiren Shoshu priest and later reproduced by the Soka Gakkai.

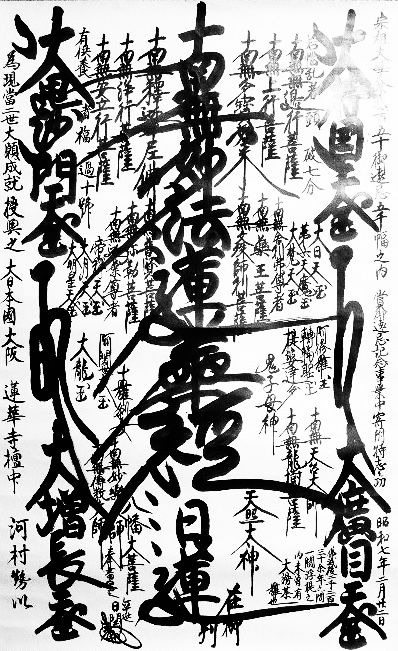
A Gohonzon Mandala transcribed by Nichikai Shonin, the 60th High Priest of Nichiren Shoshu.

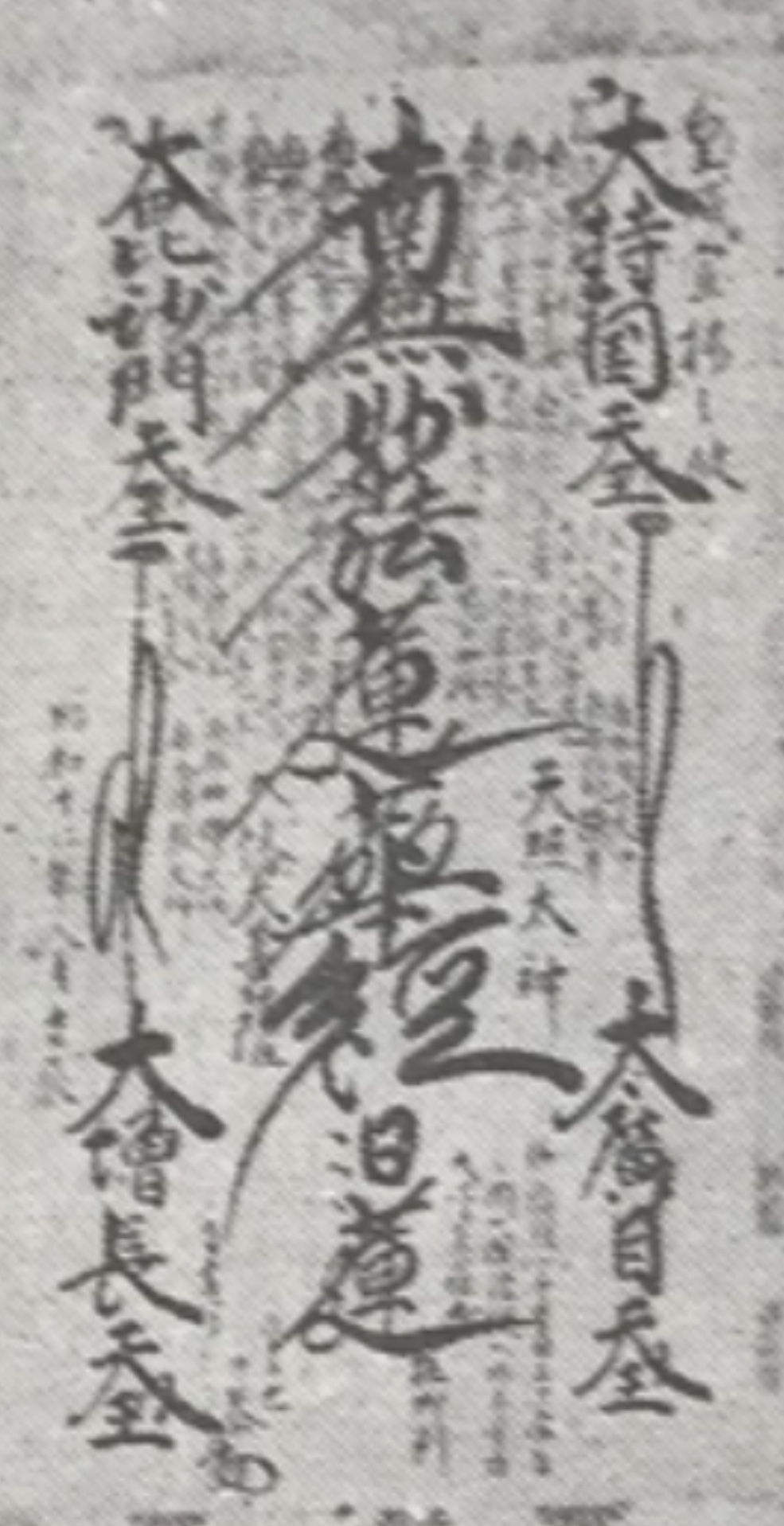
A Gohonzon Mandala transcribed by Nikkyo Shonin, the 62nd High Priest of Nichiren Shoshu.

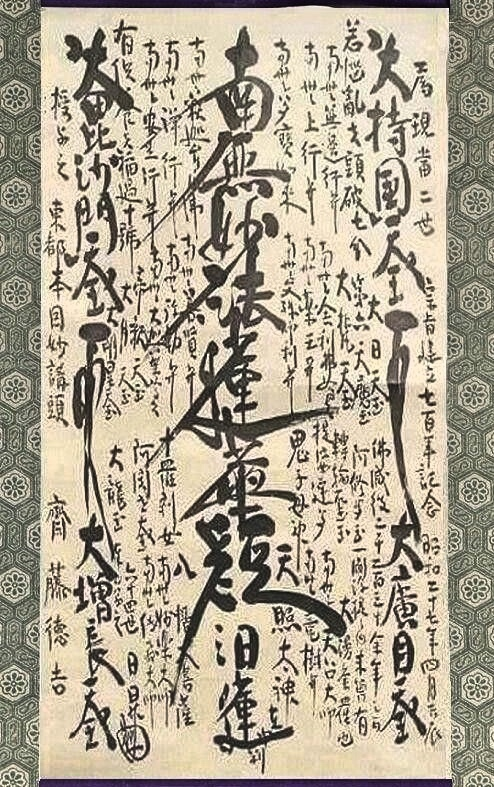
A Gohonzon Mandala as transcribed by Nissho Shonin, the 64th High Priest of Nichiren Shoshu, on 19 May 1951.

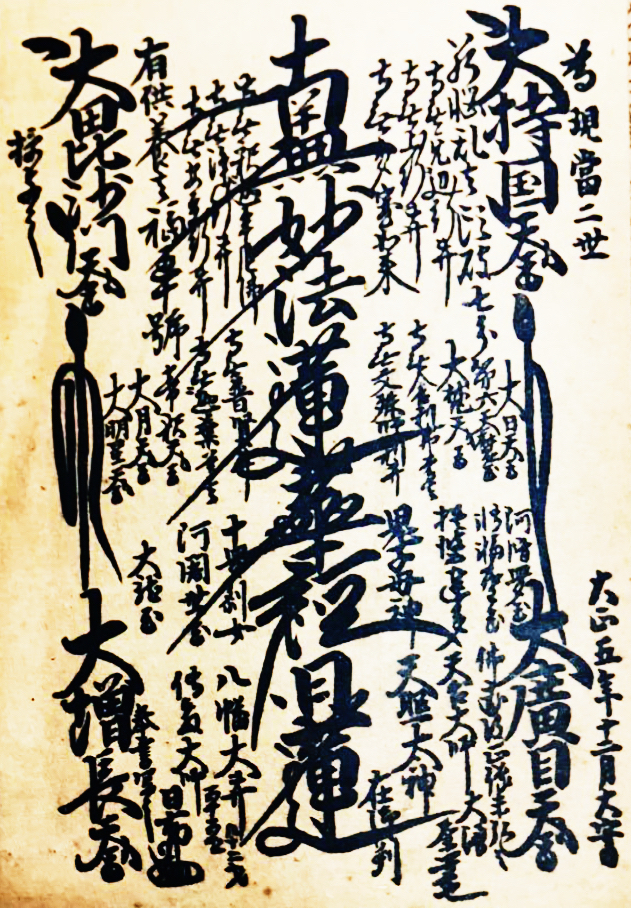
A Gohonzon Mandala transcribed by Nichijun Shonin, the 65th High Priest of Nichiren Shoshu.

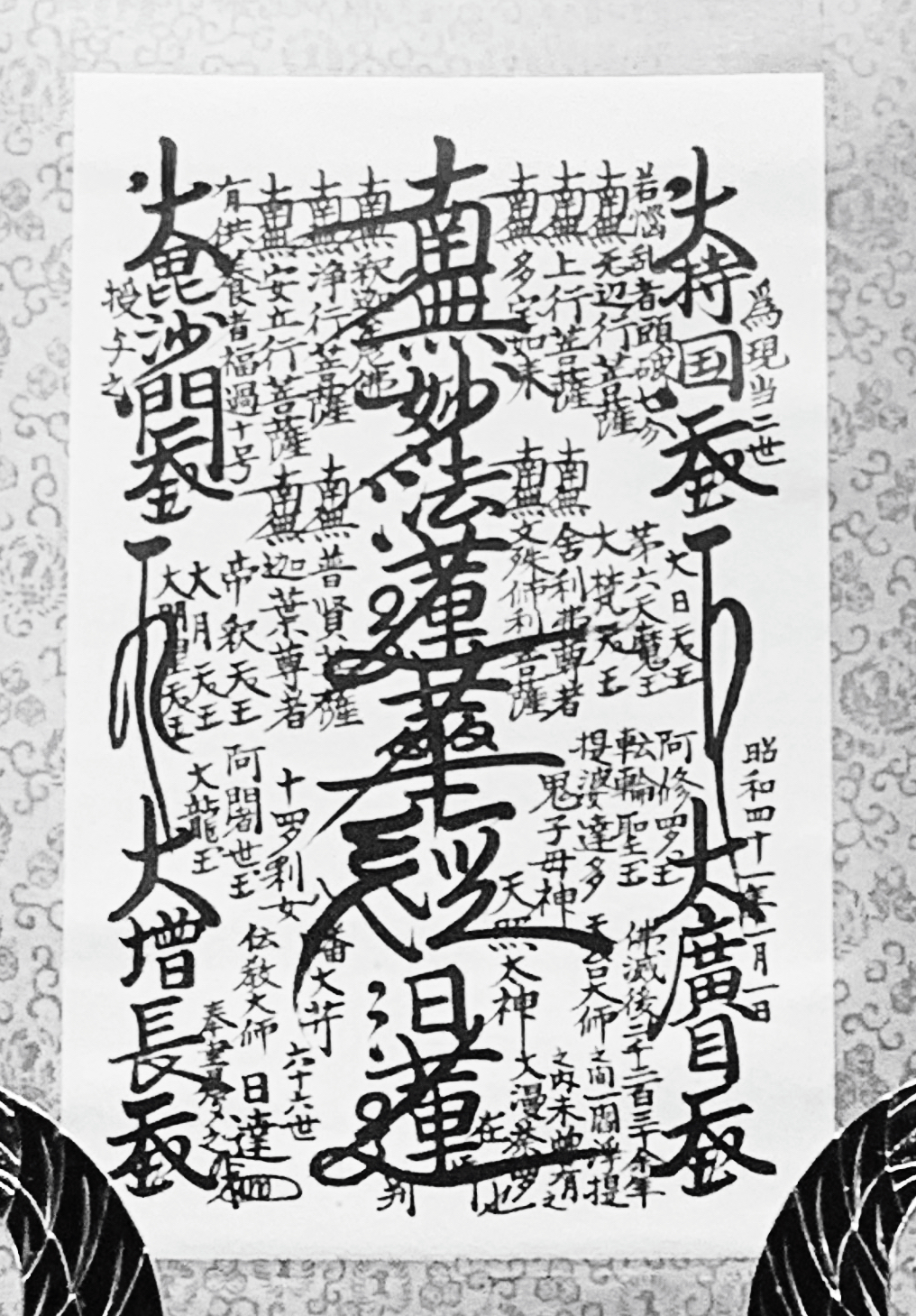
A Gohonzon Mandala transcribed by Nittatsu Hosoi Shonin, the 66th High Priest of Nichiren Shoshu.

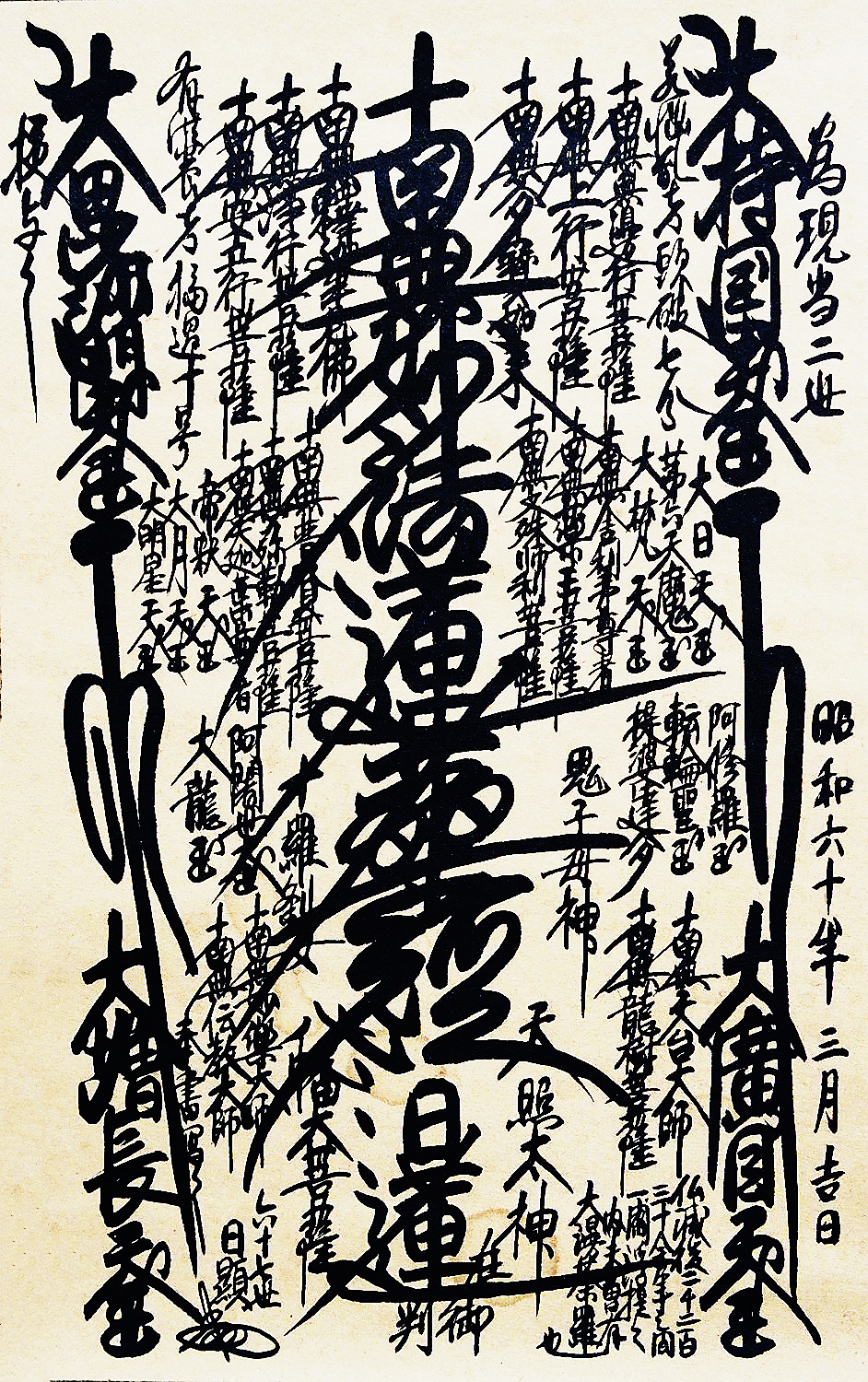
A Gohonzon Mandala transcribed on 8 March 1985 by Nikken Abe, the 67th High Priest of Nichiren Shoshu.

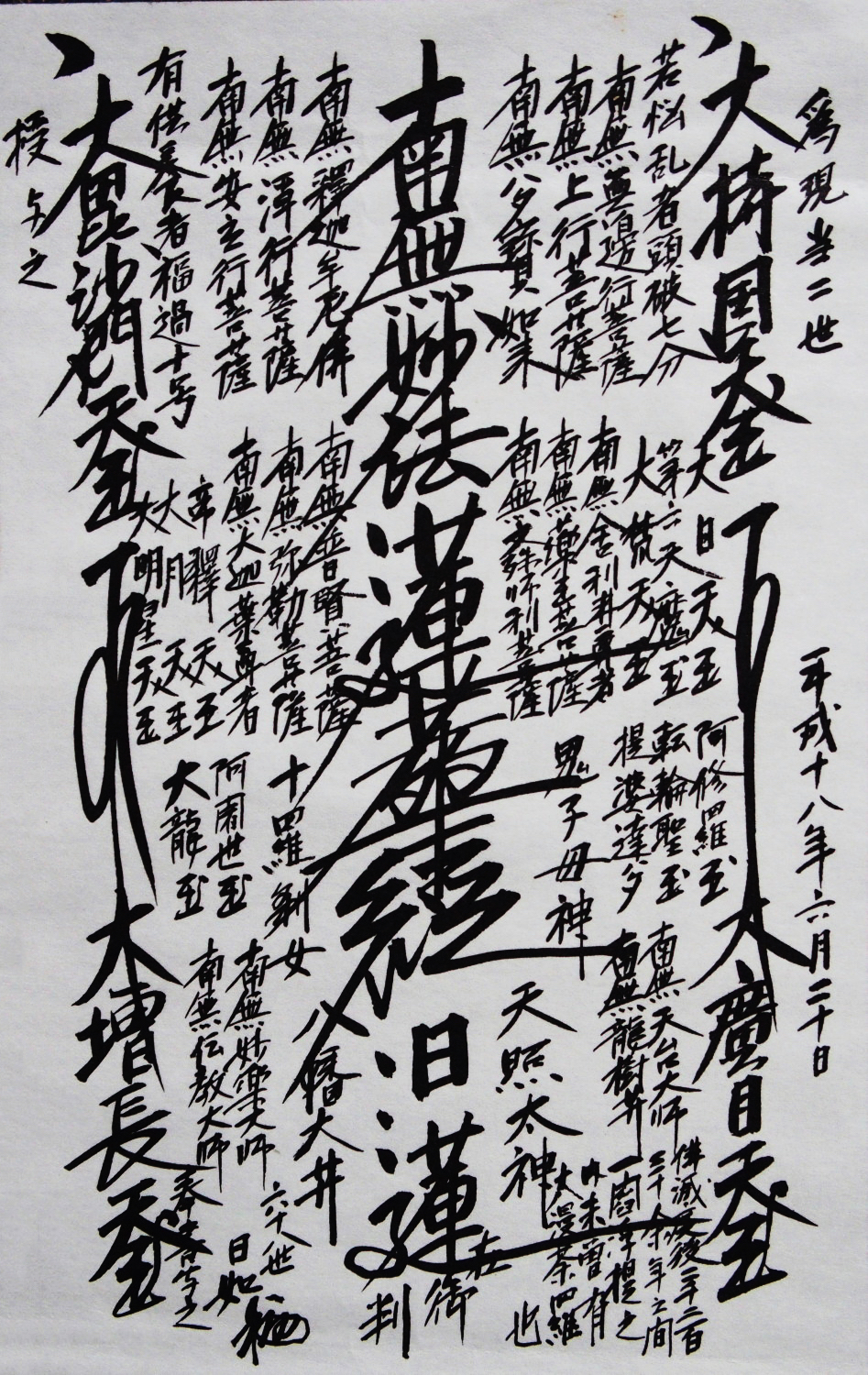
A Gohonzon Mandala transcribed by Nichi-Nyo Shonin, the 68th High Priest of Nichiren Shoshu.

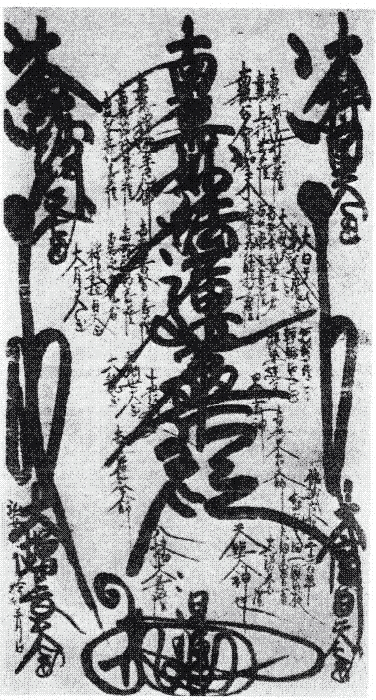
The Shishinden Gohonzon, a Nichiren-inscribed Gohonzon dated 3 March 1280, designated to be given to the future Emperor of Japan for preservation. Two certified copies are kept at Yoboji Temple Kyoto and at Myohoji Temple in Akita while the original is kept at Taisekiji temple. The ninth High Priest Nichiu Shonin transcribed a wooden copy of this image and stored it in the Numazu caves as an unconsecrated decoy during times of war when the Head Temple was threatened under attack.

== See also ==
- Honzon

== Sources ==
- Nichiren Mandala Study Workshop
- The Writings of Nichiren Daishonin, Soka Gakkai, 1999 (available online here.)
- The Life of Nichiren Daishonin. Kirimura, Yasuji. Nichiren Shoshu International Centre, 1980
  Note: NSIC, publisher of this work, is no longer associated with Nichiren Shoshu and is now affiliated with Soka Gakkai.
