= Shōshinkai =

Japanese Nichiren Buddhist dissenting group formed in July 1980

Shōshinkai (正信会), full name Nichiren-Shōshū-Shōshinkai (日蓮正宗正信会), is a Japanese Nichiren Buddhist dissenting group formed in July 1980 by approximately 200 Nichiren Shōshū priests who were mostly the disciples of the former High Priest Nittatsu Hosoi, along with their lay followers who were critical of the Soka Gakkai.

The association is known for rejection of the legitimacy of successorship of 67th High Priest Nikken Abe. Nikken Abe expelled the association in 1980, citing further defiance while demoting those who have returned to Nichiren Shoshu to a loss of priestly capacities and loss of senior roles as probationary punishment. Most of these priests have either aged and deceased, reverting their temple property with new younger Nichiren Shoshu priests taking over the administration to the Head Temple Taisekiji while others have accordingly joined other Nichiren sects until their retirement.

== Background ==
During the 1970s, the Sōka Gakkai undertook a number of activities and propagated several notions that many in the Nichiren Shōshū priesthood and laity saw as deviations from traditional Nichiren Shōshū doctrine. Ultimately, the sentiment within the priesthood and traditional lay organizations grew so strong that a split became imminent, and, at a special leaders meeting held at Nichiren Shōshū Head Temple Taiseki-ji on 7 November 1978, termed the Tozan of Apology, the senior leadership of Sōka Gakkai apologized to the priesthood and promised to correct the incompatibilities and never deviate from Nichiren Shōshū doctrine again. This apology was later printed in both the Seikyo Shimbun SGI magazine (November edition) as well as the manuscript of the Dai-Nichiren December 1978 publication.

On 24 April 1979, Sōka Gakkai's President Daisaku Ikeda stepped down to take responsibility for the incident. In addition, at the 40th General Meeting of the Sōka Gakkai on 3 May 1979, the 66th High Priest Nittatsu Hosoi declared his decision to accept the organization's apology and forgive the matter on the explicit condition that Sōka Gakkai observe its solemn promise to uphold Nichiren Shōshū doctrine. Nittatsu also instructed his own priests to stop open criticism of Sōka Gakkai and to cease encouraging Sōka Gakkai members to affiliate themselves directly with the temples, which had previously exacerbated the contested issue.

== Succession dispute ==
On 22 July 1979, Nittatsu died of chronic heart disease without directly naming his successor. Shinno Abe, at that time a young priest, insisted that he was secretly given permission to be the next High Priest by Nittatsu before he had died and succeeded him as the 67th High Priest, Nikken Abe. He changed his predecessor's policy and gave Sōka Gakkai a chance to cooperate with him. But the priests (who were mainly the disciples of the former High Priest) who later formed the Shōshinkai disagreed, claiming Sōka Gakkai had only taken its deviations underground.

The same group of dissenting priests continued their campaign of criticism and formed Shōshinkai to organize their efforts into a movement. Despite repeated admonitions from the new High Priest Nikken and Nichiren Shōshū leadership to cease and desist, Shōshinkai went ahead with a major rally on 24 August 1980. Due to this dissension, Nikken and the senior Nichiren Shōshū leadership punished a number of priests for their involvement, including five excommunications. The Shōshinkai priests involved with the excommunication responded that such act was ineffective because the punishment was done by an illegitimate High Priest.

On 13 December 1980, the priests of the Shōshinkai sent a document to Nikken casting doubt on the legitimacy of his office. They then filed suit with a local government court on 21 January 1981 seeking to annul Nikken's appointment on the grounds that he had never been named successor by Nittatsu. Nikken demanded that the Shōshinkai priests retract their accusations or face excommunication. Some two hundred priests refused. Upon the publicized notice of excommunication, a number of them filed a lawsuit seeking reinstatement, but the local court ruled that all religious claims, including the petition for annulment of Nikken's status were internal Nichiren Shoshu matters to be resolved within the sect itself.

== Later years ==
The Shōshinkai continued its anti-Sōka Gakkai and anti-High Priest Nikken activities, even accepting new acolytes into the priesthood and conferring initiation ceremonies for new believers. Most Shōshinkai priests continued living within their Nichiren Shōshū temples, which they were technically allowed to do until their death.

The Head Temple Taisekiji has declared that these temple properties have since reverted to Nichiren Shōshū as their occupants have died or been ordered by the courts to vacate. While many have deceased or abandoned their priesthood, only a few Shōshinkai priests have reverted to Nichiren Shōshū, and even so they were deprived of their kesa and Koromo Robe and had to start as complete beginners (kozo) as part of their punishment. Accordingly, their temples remained under Nichiren Shoshu as the priests have aged and new younger priests affiliated with the Head Temple Taisekiji take on the role of the temple property administration.

Accordingly, several Shōshinkai priests from the 1980s have also gone to other varying Nichiren sects as they age, among them in particular is the Nichiren Shū sect at Kuon-ji in Yamanashi Prefecture. There, they have also opened a research center called Kofu Danjo (興風談所) that has spawned books that have attracted attention from other Nichiren Buddhist organizations for their scholarly content.

== Sources ==
- Shoshū Hashaku Guide (Jp: 諸宗破折ガイド: Guide to refuting [erroneous teachings of] other schools). Taiseki-ji, 2003 (no ISBN); pp. 178–79.
