= Nichimoku =

Japanese Nichiren Buddhist monk

Nichimoku Shōnin 日 目 上 人
- Title: Niidakyo Ajari Nichimoku Shōnin; Other names: Torao-Maru; Kunaikyo-Kimi

Personal life
- Born: 28 April 1260 Hatake, Kannami, Tagata District, Shizuoka
- Died: 15 November 1333 (aged 73) Tarui, Mino province
- Parents: Niida Goro Shigetsuna; Ren Ani
- Education: Enzo-bo Shingon Temple, Mount Soto (Izu Peninsula)

Religious life
- Religion: Nichiren Shoshu Buddhism
- Dharma name: Niidakyo Ajari Nichimoku

Senior posting
- Based in: Japan
- Post: Third High Priest of Nichiren Shōshū
- Predecessor: Nikkō Shōnin
- Successor: Nichidō Shōnin
- Reincarnation: TBD

Nichimoku Shōnin (日目上人; 28 April 1260 – 15 November 1333), Buddhist name: Niidakyo Ajari Nichimoku, was a junior disciple of Nichiren who sided with Nikkō Shōnin after Nichiren's death. Nikkō Shōnin later appointed Nichimoku as his successor as Head Priest (Kancho) of Taiseki-ji temple.

Pious beliefs claim that he will someday leave the state of Nirvana to usher conversion of the Emperor of Japan and the widespread propagation of Nichiren Shoshu Buddhism. Today, the Mokushiza seat inside the Dai-Kyakuden (English: Grand Reception Hall) of Taisekiji Head Temple is named in honor of Nichimoku Shōnin.

In 1333, Nichimoku died at age 74, and his cremated remains are stored within Taisekiji, while the anniversary of his death on November 15 coincides with the Shichi-Go-San tradition for young children called Mokushi-E ceremony, later popularized during the Edo period. The symbol crest attributed to Nichimoku is the Three Friends of Winter combination, and in Buddhist iconography he is often portrayed with a flattened scalp.

== Early life ==
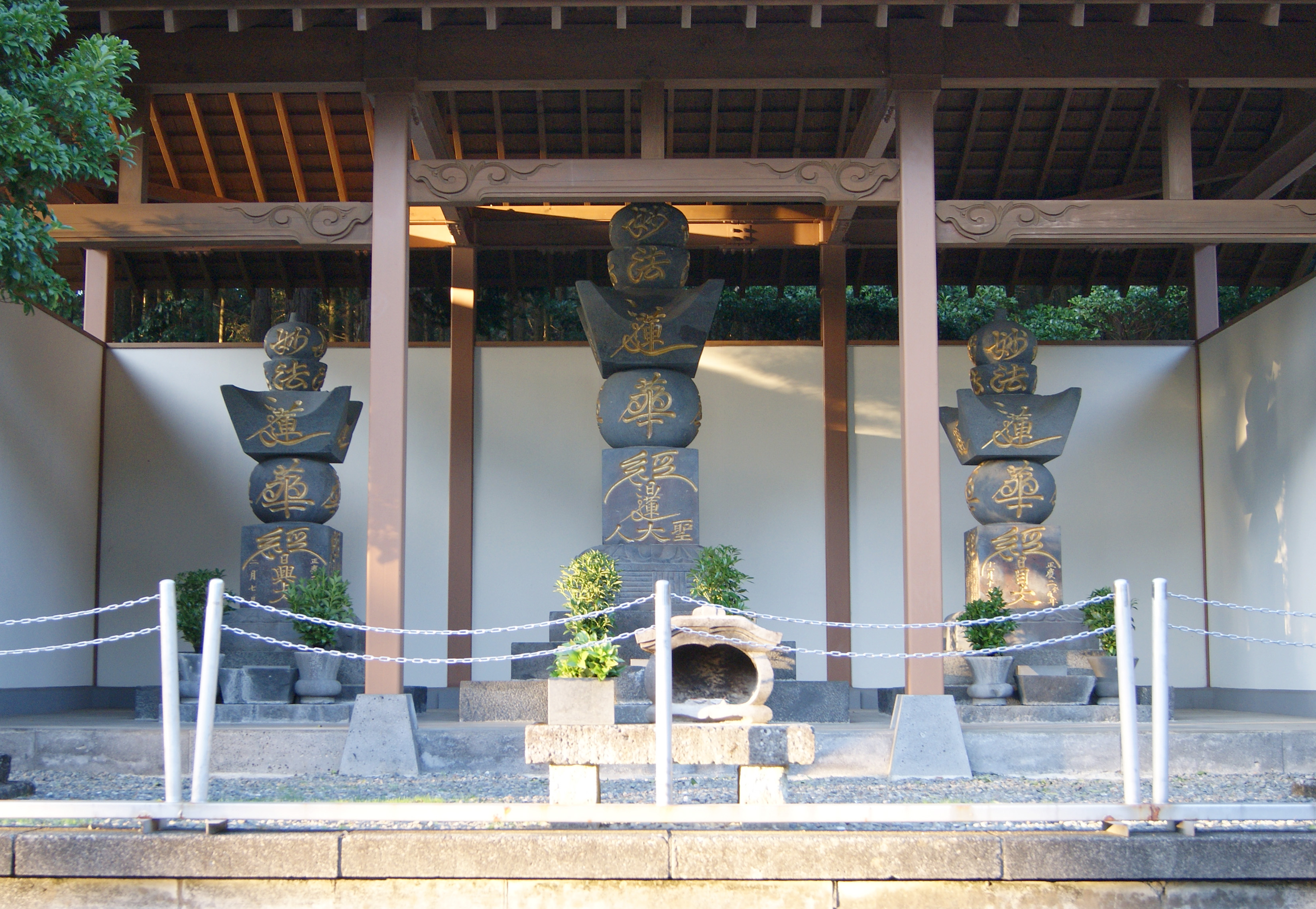
Three commemoriative Buddhist stupas in honor of Nichiren, Nikkō and Nichimoku. Circa 1685, during the Tokugawa period. Taisekiji temple.

Nichimoku Shōnin was born in Hateke-go in Izu, Tagata District, Shizuoka prefecture, on 28 April 1260. His father was Niida Goro Shigetsuna and his mother was Ren Ani, who was the eldest daughter of Lord Nanjo Hyo-e Shichiro, the father of Nanjo Tokimitsu. Ren Ani was the elder sister of Nanjo Tokimitsu.

In the year 1274, at the age of 12, Nikkō Shōnin met Nichimoku at Mount Soto. That year he witnessed a debate between the chief priest, Shikizobozu, and Nikkō Shōnin, and later became Nikkō's disciple.

At the age of thirteen, he entered the Shingon Enzobo temple, a center that focused on teaching the principle of the master and disciple relationship, as it commonly applied to mostly Samurai warriors.

In 8 April 1276, (age 14), he entered the priesthood and embraced the Dharma at Mount Soto Temple; he upheld Nikkō Shōnin as his master and received the disciple name of Kunaikyo-Kimi.

== As Nichiren's disciple ==
On 24 November 1276, he traveled with Nikkō Shōnin to Mount Minobu. There, he met Nichiren for the first time, who approved his new Buddhist training. For seven years, he served Nichiren as an assistant until Nichiren's death in 1282.

In Buddhist iconography, Nichimoku is featured with a flattened scalp due to a legend claiming that every day for seven years, Nichimoku Shōnin made several trips to the river in the valley of Minobu to fetch morning water for Nichiren. Nichimoku then carried the water in a wooden bucket on his head which is said to have caused a depression in his head. Today, a similar custom is performed by younger Nichiren Shoshu priests in training, upon which they fetch early morning water at a nearby river for the Dai Gohonzon image.

In February 1279, Nichiren finally inscribed a Gohonzon for Nichimoku, now kept inside the Head Temple Taisekiji. In September 1282, Nichimoku accompanied Nichiren and Nikkō to the therapeutic hot springs of Hitachi, in Iwaki City of Fukushima Prefecture. On the way, they stopped at the house of Ikegami Munenaka at Musashi Province in Ota, Tokyo where Nichiren died.

Upon Nichimoku's return to Mount Minobu, he maintained Nichiren's grave, and he traveled to Oshu Province in the Tohoku Region to propagate the teachings of Nichiren. He established the four Oshu temples Hongen-ji, Jogyo-ji, Myoen-ji, and Myokyo-ji.

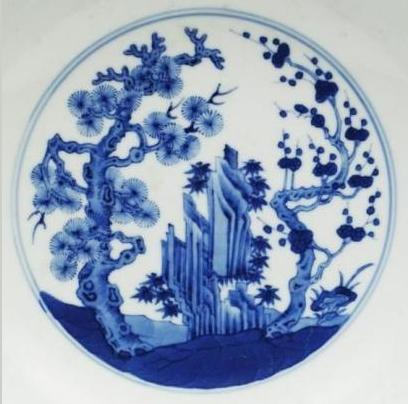
Sho-Chiku-Bai, The Pine tree, Plum tree and Bamboo tree, the crest symbol adopted by Nichimoku Shōnin. A Chinese porcelain plate of the Qianlong Emperor, 1735.

As a result of Nichimoku's efforts in the Oshu region, Nikkō Shōnin bestowed the Gohonzon upon numerous believers in the area almost every year, after establishing Taiseki-ji. There are 30 Gohonzons inscribed by Nichimoku that are still catalogued and preserved to this day.

After doctrinal conflicts between Nikkō Shōnin and Mimbu Niko and Hakiri Sanenaga, the steward of Mount Minobu, he sided with Nikkō and left Yamanashi Prefecture. On 13 October 1290, Nikkō Shōnin bestowed a Joza Gohonzon to Nichimoku to mark the beginning of transfer of successorship. This ‘’Joza’’ Gohonzon is currently enshrined in the Grand Reception Hall (Dai-Kyaku-den) of Taisekiji, and is now known as the Ogazawari Gohonzon.

Eight years later, in 1298, Nikkō Shōnin followed Nichiren’s example of assigning successors and designated six senior disciples, headed by Nichimoku. After this designation, Nikkō Shōnin moved to Omosu (currently Kitayama Hommon-ji Temple) and began to transfer the entirety of Taiseki-ji to Nichimoku Shōnin.

On 10 November 1332, Nikkō Shōnin, at the age of 87, finalized the transfer of successorship to Nichimoku Shōnin via the "Articles to be Observed After the Passing of Nikkō" (Nikkō ato jo-jo no koto), which he had previously prepared, along with the Buddhist articles that were previously confiscated from Kuonji Temple. Nikkō died four months later on 7 February 1333.

At age 74, Nichimoku continued to warn and remonstrate against the Kamakura imperial authorities and his frequent travels under difficult conditions worsened his already poor health. His legs slowly became paralyzed and he was constantly ill. Nevertheless, he considered it his mission to present Nichiren's treatise Risshō Ankoku Ron (立正安国論) (On Securing the Peace of the Land through the Propagation of True Buddhism) to Emperor Go-daigo in person, which failed. For this reason, some pious believers claim this to be an unfinished task for his future rebirth.

Prior to his leaving Takiseki-ji one last time, Nichimoku Shōnin is claimed to have privately chosen Nichido Shōnin from among his senior disciples. Accompanied by the priests Nichizon and Nichigo, Nichimoku Shōnin then set forth on his journey to remonstrate against the Emperor of Japan. Traveling to Kyoto with paralysis took approximately 11 days, and he finally fell mortally ill at Tarui in Mino Province in Gifu Prefecture. The two disciples who accompanied him constantly remained at his side and cared for him. In the end, Nichimoku Shōnin directed his two disciples to go on to meet with the Emperor and remonstrate in his stead; furthermore, he instructed them to report the news to Nichido Shōnin. Then, he directed the two to enshrine a Gohonzon and he quietly chanted Nam Myoho Renge Kyo.

== Death and legacy ==
Nichimoku died on 15 November 1333, on which his two disciples mistook him to still be asleep. Both disciples, Nichizon and Nichigo cremated Nichimoku Shōnin and carried his remains with them, as they went on to confront the Emperor in his stead. Later on, Nichizon remained in Kyoto to propagate while Nichigo returned to Taiseki-ji with the remains of Nichimoku Shōnin.

Pious traditions claim that upon his return to the Saha world of humans, he will accomplish the unfinished task of remonstration before his mortal death on 15 November 1333, on which present High Priests of Nichiren Shoshu customarily offer a banquet dinner for younger priests in training in hopes of finding the rebirth of Nichimoku Shōnin among the prospective candidates.

According to pious hagiography, Nichimoku Shōnin's deathbed poem read as follows:

"Generations shall pass

And our determination shall grow
At the foot of Mount Fuji

Like smoke that reaches far beyond the clouds."

Among believers, the anniversary of his death on November 15 is associated with the Shichi-Go-San tradition for young children of receiving sweets and money, which was later popularized during the Edo period, now called the Mokushi-e ceremony. The venerated Mokushiza seat inside the Dai-Kyakuden (English: Grand Reception Hall) of Taisekiji Head Temple is named in honor of Nichimoku Shōnin, while the traditional Buddhist liturgy of Gongyo is recited silently in his name. The symbol crest attributed to Nichimoku is the combination of Pine tree, Plum tree, Bamboo, signifying the ancient Chinese symbol of Three Friends of Winter which are believed to auspiciously endure hardship through the winter season.
