= Kenshōkai =

Branch of Nichiren Buddhism

Fuji Taiseki-ji Kenshōkai
- 冨士大石寺顕正会
- Classification: Nichiren Buddhism
- Headquarters: Saitama, Japan
- Origin: 1942 (founded as Myōshinkō, renamed as Fuji Taiseki Kenshōkai in 1982); Japan
- Official website: https://kenshokai.or.jp

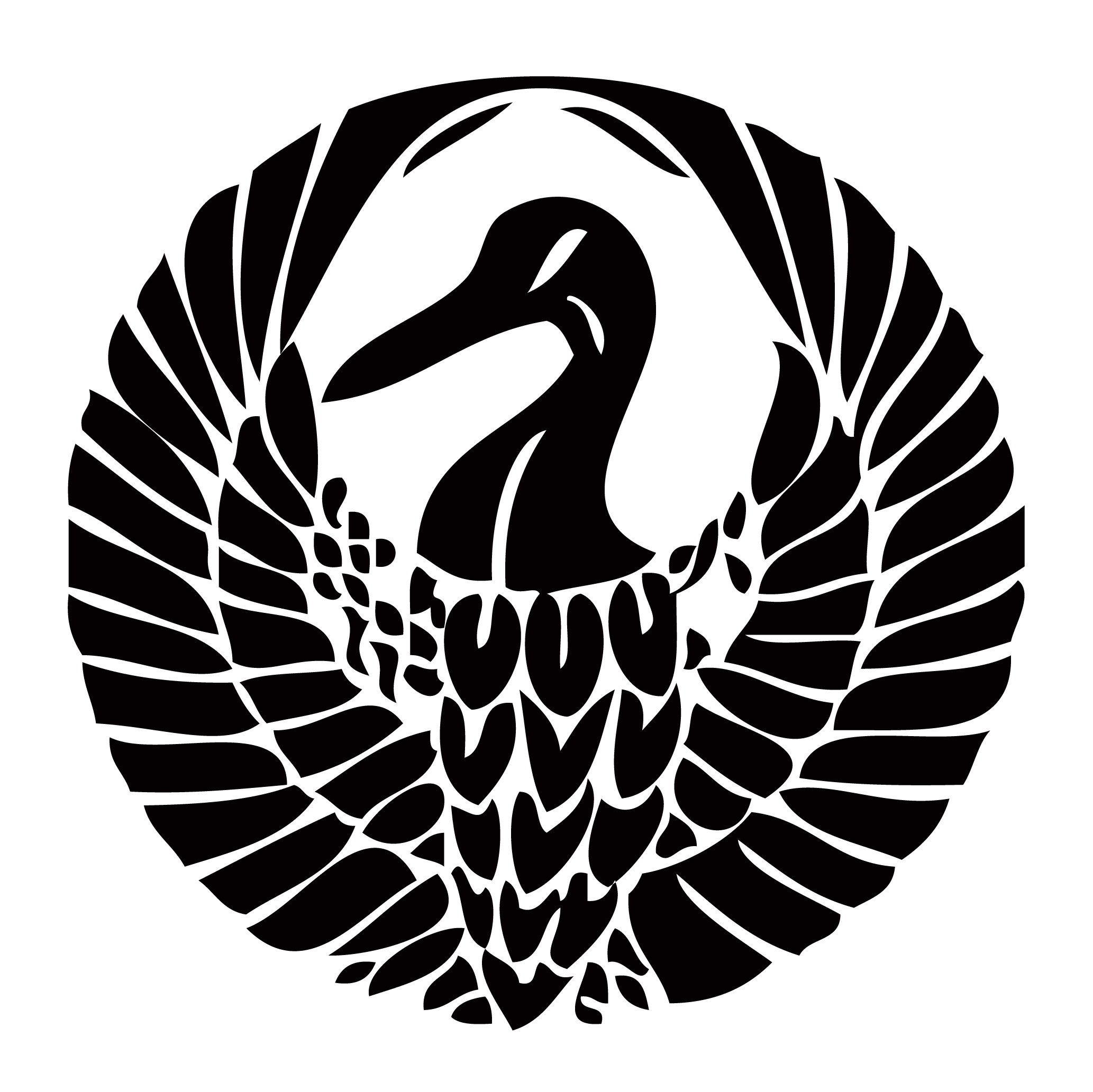
The rounded Crane Bird of Nichiren Shoshu, "Tsuru—Maru", used as the official symbol of the Kenshokai lay organization.

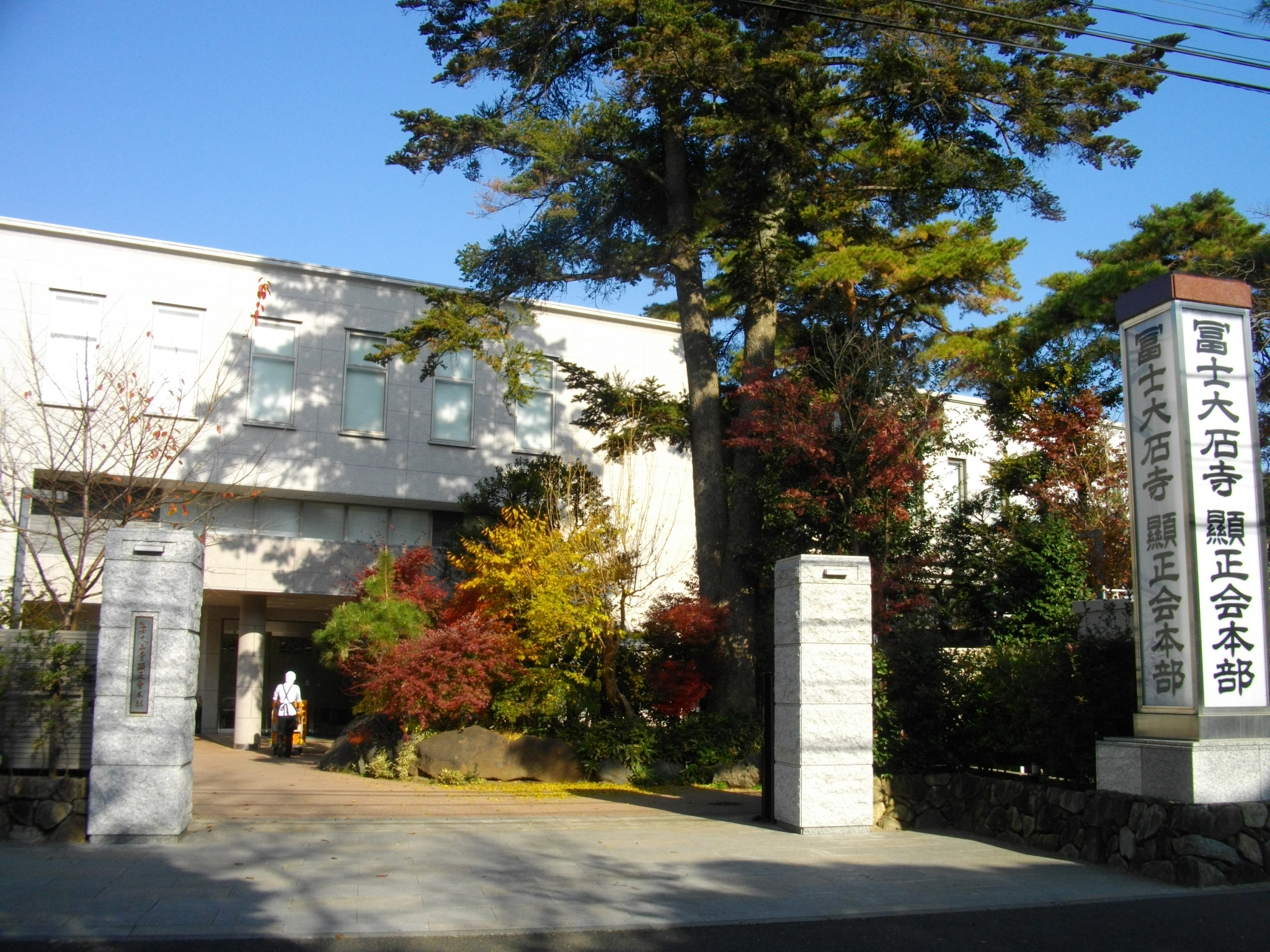
The Kenshōkai main headquarters in Saitama Prefecture, Japan.

Fuji Taisekiji Kenshōkai (冨士大石寺顕正会, literally Fuji Taiseki-ji Society for Revealing the Correct Teaching) is a Japanese lay Buddhist organization founded in 1942 as a lay association within Nichiren Shōshū and based on the teachings of the 13th-century monk Nichiren. Nichiren taught that devotion to the Lotus Sutra represents the highest expression of Buddhist truth and is the proper path to enlightenment in the present age. Kenshōkai promotes religious practice centered on chanting Nam-myōhō-renge-kyō, devotion to the Gohonzon, and the propagation of Nichiren Buddhist teachings.

The organization was originally established under the name Myōshinkō and later adopted the name Kenshōkai in 1982. It was formerly affiliated with Nichiren Shōshū but was expelled in 1974 following doctrinal and institutional disputes. Kenshōkai maintains its headquarters in Saitama Prefecture, Japan, and operates as a lay religious movement focused on religious practice, doctrinal study, and missionary outreach. The group regards the Dai-Gohonzon enshrined at the Taiseki-ji temple as central to its religious belief system. Kenshōkai has grown significantly since its founding and is considered one of the newer lay movements within the broader tradition of Nichiren Buddhism.

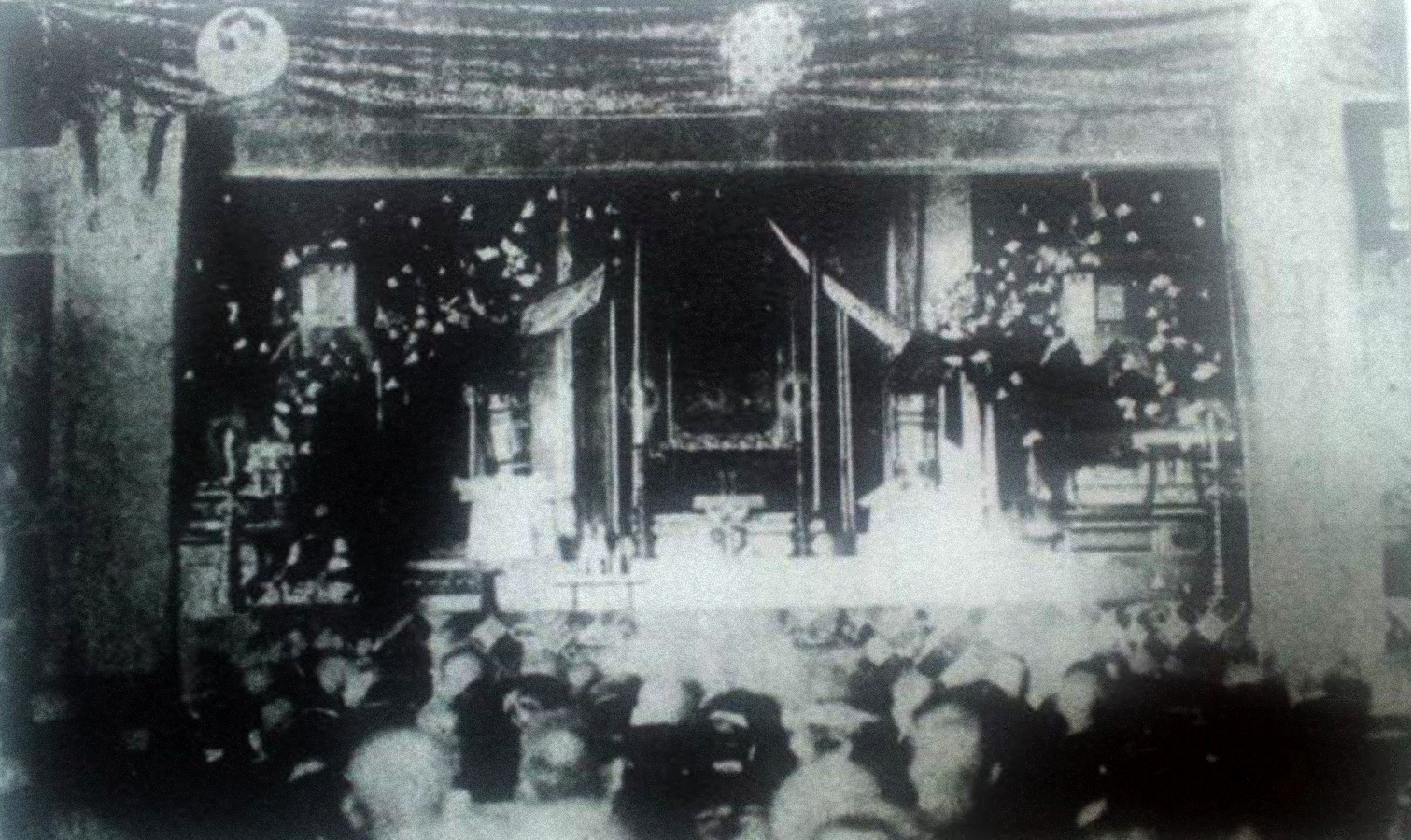
An obscure photo of the enshrined Dai-Gohonzon in the Gohozo Kaidan building in Taisekiji. Photo by Mr. Kokichi Yui, circa 1915.

== History ==
=== 1942 – Foundation as Myōshinkō ===
Kenshōkai originated in 1942 under the name Myōshinkō (妙信講, “Association of True Faith”), established as a lay organization affiliated with Nichiren Shōshū. Its purpose was to promote devotion to the teachings of Nichiren, particularly faith in the Lotus Sutra and the practice of chanting Nam-myōhō-renge-kyō.

=== 1945–1950s – Postwar reorganization and growth ===
Following World War II, Myōshinkō reorganized and expanded as religious freedom was restored in Japan under the new constitution. During this period, many lay Buddhist organizations experienced rapid growth, and Myōshinkō increased its membership through propagation activities and doctrinal instruction.

=== 1960s – Expansion of missionary activities ===
Throughout the 1960s, Myōshinkō intensified its propagation efforts, emphasizing shakubuku, or direct conversion, as a religious duty. The organization encouraged members to actively share Nichiren Buddhist teachings and strengthen their faith through regular practice and participation in group activities.

=== 1974 – Separation from Nichiren Shōshū ===
In 1974, Myōshinkō was expelled from Nichiren Shōshū due to doctrinal and institutional disagreements with the priesthood. Despite the separation, the organization continued to uphold many of the doctrinal principles associated with Nichiren Shōshū and maintained reverence for the Dai-Gohonzon enshrined at Taiseki-ji.

=== 1982 – Adoption of the name Kenshōkai ===
In 1982, the organization formally adopted the name Kenshōkai (顕正会, literally “Society for Revealing the Correct Teaching”). The name change reflected its mission to promote what it considers the orthodox teachings of Nichiren Buddhism and to distinguish itself as an independent lay movement.

=== 1980s–1990s – Organizational development and expansion ===
During the late 20th century, Kenshōkai expanded its organizational structure, establishing regional centers and strengthening its leadership system. Its activities focused on religious services, doctrinal education, and propagation efforts aimed at increasing membership.

=== 2000s–present – Continued activity and international presence ===
In the 21st century, Kenshōkai has continued its activities as a lay Nichiren Buddhist organization. Its primary activities include chanting practice, doctrinal study, and missionary outreach. While its main base remains in Japan, Kenshōkai has also developed a presence outside Japan through its members and affiliated groups.

== Beliefs ==
=== Beliefs and practices ===
Kenshōkai teaches that the ultimate truth of Buddhism is contained in the Lotus Sutra, which it regards as the highest teaching of the Buddha. The organization follows the doctrines of Nichiren, who taught that chanting Nam-myōhō-renge-kyō, known as daimoku, is the essential practice for attaining enlightenment in the present age.

The central religious practice of Kenshōkai consists of chanting Nam-myōhō-renge-kyō and performing gongyo, the recitation of selected passages from the Lotus Sutra. Members direct their practice toward the Gohonzon, a sacred mandala inscribed by Nichiren that serves as an object of devotion. Kenshōkai teaches that through faith, practice, and study, individuals can transform their karma and attain Buddhahood in their present lifetime.

Kenshōkai also emphasizes shakubuku, or the active propagation of Nichiren’s teachings, as an important religious responsibility. This practice is regarded as a means of helping others achieve happiness and contributing to the realization of a peaceful society based on Buddhist principles.

=== Mission ===
Kenshōkai’s stated mission is the propagation of Nichiren Buddhism and the realization of a society grounded in the principles of the Lotus Sutra. The organization teaches that the widespread acceptance of Nichiren’s teachings will lead to individual spiritual transformation and contribute to social stability and peace.

Kenshōkai places particular importance on restoring what it considers the correct form of Nichiren Buddhist practice and strengthening faith in the Gohonzon. Its activities include religious services, doctrinal study, and missionary outreach aimed at introducing others to its teachings.

=== View of life ===
Kenshōkai teaches that all individuals possess an inherent Buddha nature and the potential to attain enlightenment through correct faith and practice. The organization emphasizes the principle of cause and effect (karma), teaching that present circumstances are shaped by past actions but can be transformed through Buddhist practice.

According to Kenshōkai doctrine, suffering is regarded as an opportunity for spiritual growth and transformation. By chanting Nam-myōhō-renge-kyō and maintaining faith in the Gohonzon, practitioners seek to overcome personal difficulties, develop wisdom and compassion, and achieve happiness in both present and future existences.

== Branch Halls ==
There are branch halls all over the country where members are a part of. Kenshōkai also has a presence overseas, with a recognised group in Taiwan, and smaller groups in other countries such as the Philippines.

=== Hokkaido and Tohoku ===
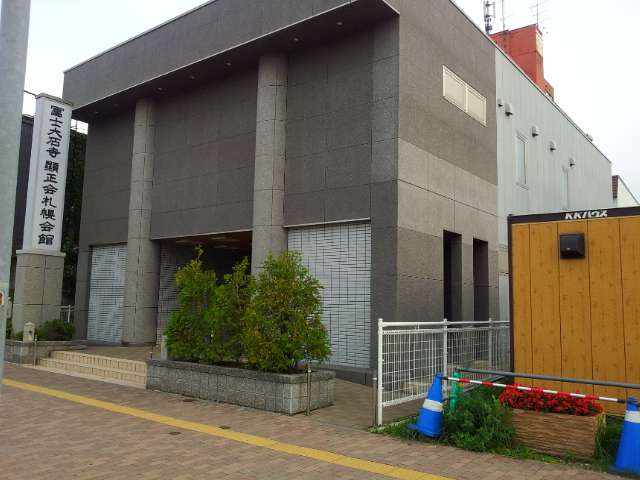
Fuji Taiseki-ji Kenshokai Sapporo Branch

- Sapporo
- Kuroishi
- Hachinohe
- Morioka
- Sendai
- Takasu
- Akita
- Yamagata
- Koriyama
- Aizu

=== Kanto ===
- Mito
- Tsukuba
- Utsunomiya
- Gunma
- Chiba
- Asahi
- Minamibo
- Tokyo
- Saitama (Headquarters)
- Tama
- Kanagawa
- Sagami
- Odawara

=== Chūbū ===
- Niigata
- Sanjo
- Nagaoka
- Sado
- Toyama
- Kanazawa
- Fukui
- Kofu
- Shinshu
- Tarui
- Shizuoka
- Hamamatsu
- Nagoya
- Mie

=== Kansai, Chugoku, and Shikoku ===
- Kyoto
- Osaka
- Himeji
- Okayama
- Hiroshima
- Onomichi
- Ehime
- Kochi
- Tottori
- Yamaguchi

=== Kyushu and Okinawa ===
- Fukuoka
- Nagasaki
- Kumamoto
- Oita
- Miyazaki
- Kagoshima
- Okinawa

=== Overseas ===
- Taipei, Taiwan

== Membership and structure ==
Time Magazine has described Kenshōkai as the "biggest of the new religions" with "nationalistic appeal". Jacqueline Stone opines that Kenshōkai represents the:

"hardline Nichirenist position, promoting a rigorous Lotus Sutra exclusivism and the elimination of Dharma slander for the welfare of Japan and the world."

The nationalistic group is considered one of the fastest-growing and least studied religious movements in Japan. By its own account it has around 2,700,000 registered members. Unlike Soka Gakkai, it has a highly rigid structure and does not belong to any political organization.

== See also ==
- Dai-Gohonzon
- Taiseki-ji Head Temple
- Nichiren Shoshu
- Nikko Shonin
