= Ushitora Gongyo =

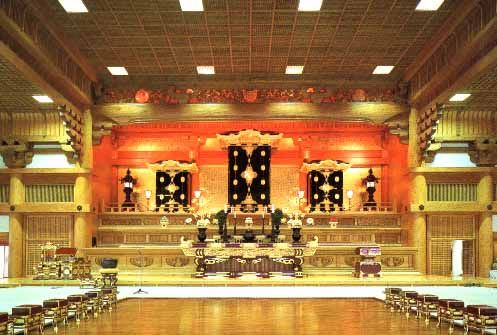
The Gohonzon of Nikko Shonin inside the Dai-Kyakuden (大客殿, Grand Reception Hall) (transcribed into wood on 15 June 1706) where the ceremony is held exclusively for its Hokkeko believers from various countries participating in the 2:30AM Buddhist service. The High Priest sits opposite in the left side seat. Taisekiji Head Temple, Japan.

Ushitora Gongyo (丑寅勤行, Ox-Tiger Persevering Practice) is a Buddhist liturgy service conducted in Nichiren Shōshū Buddhism. The service is traditionally held at 2:30 AM at the Kyakuden building of Taisekiji Head Temple, located within the lower slopes of Mount Fuji, Japan.

It is the morning prayer service which is indirectly offered to the Dai Gohonzon image, approximately one mile away from a distance area in accordance to the sect and beliefs of wide propagation. The Buddhist sect claims that the reputed ceremony has been rigidly observed for over 700 years without fail, since the death anniversary of Nikkō Shōnin on 7 February 1333.

== Overview ==
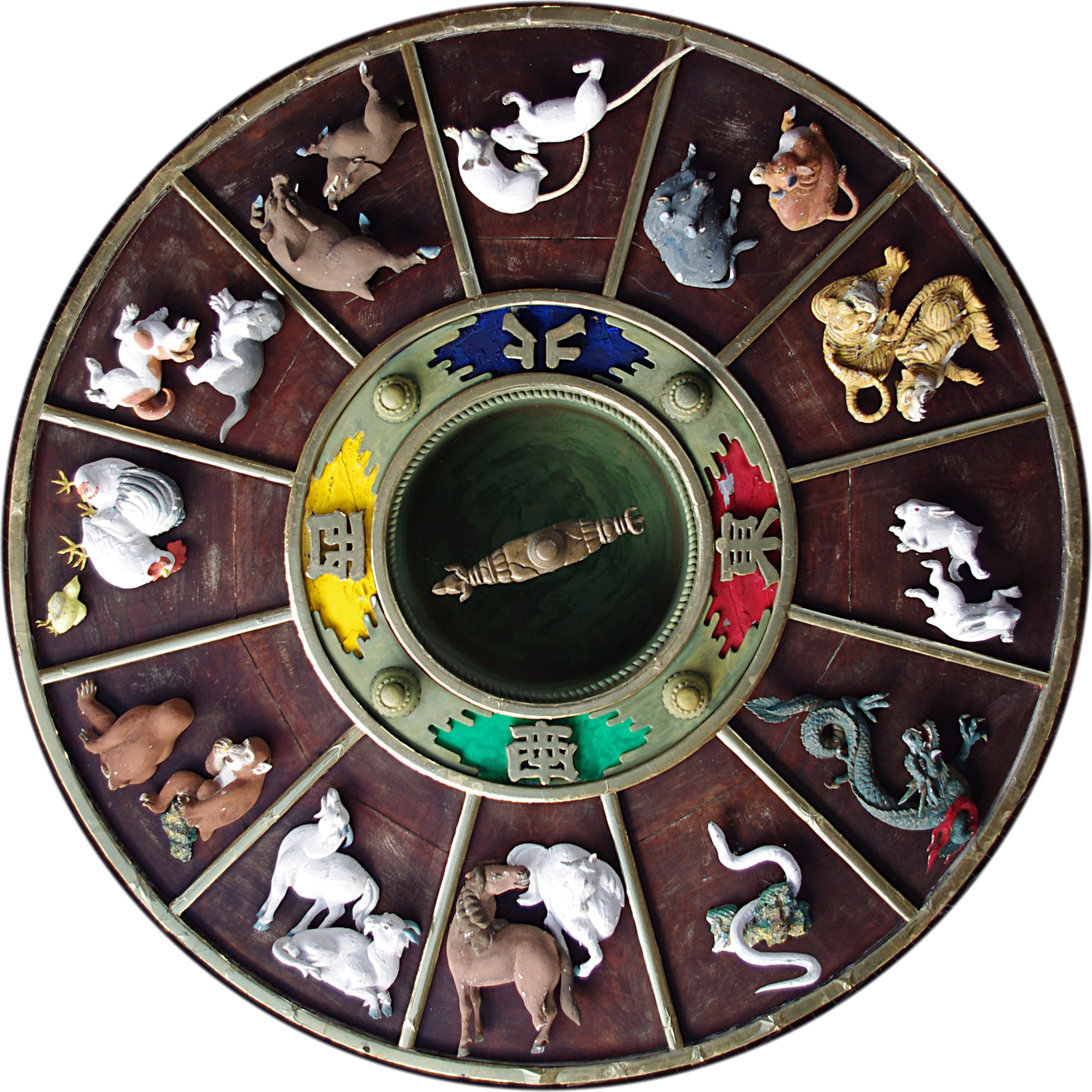
The rotation of the Chinese Zodiac per animal sign which indicates the Buddhist time assigned to the Ushitora service. A woodcarving at the Kushida Shinto Shrine, Fukuoka, Japan.

Among Nichiren Shōshū believers, several pious customs and folk beliefs are often associated with the reputedly auspicious hours of the daylight prayer service:

- The hours mark the transitional time range when Shakyamuni Buddha entered the state of Nirvana under the Bodhi tree.
- Pious beliefs which claim that between these auspicious hours are when Buddhas are said to gain Buddhahood.
- Nichiren was persecuted between these hours, proving his "true nature" as the "True Buddha" in the Three Ages of Buddhism, when the Buddhist gods, sometimes disguised as Shinto gods of Honji suijaku (Japanese: 本地垂迹) are reputedly came to his aid and rescue.
- Nichiren as the identity of True Buddha (Japanese: Hombutsu) and the passing of Shakyamuni Buddha transitioned within these auspicious hours said to have occurred in the Buddhist mountain of Vulture Peak, from 15 February (Shakyamuni's entrance into Nirvana) and 16 February (Nichiren's rebirth into the Saha world (Sanskrit: Manusyalokha / Japanese: Nin)
- A pious Buddhist tradition alleged to be from the early Sangha of Shakyamuni Buddha claims that he preached the Lotus Sutra and the Longer Sukhāvatīvyūha Sūtra during these hours in the holy city of Rajgir, India.
- A pious legend / custom which claims that the former steward of Mount Minobu, Hagiri Sanenaga, once prayed to Nichiren during these hours for protection, thereby carrying the pious tradition when Nikkō Shōnin moved to the land property of Nanjo Tokimitsu (Present-day Taisekiji).

The service is officiated by the High Priest of Nichiren Shōshū, or his proxy senior priest if he is unable to attend for varying reasons such as travel, preoccupation or illness. It is one of the first duties of the High Priest, who begins his official duties at midnight. The High Priest takes on a specialized seat called Mokushiza, held to be reserved for the position of third High Priest Nichimoku Shonin, who is piously believed to return someday from the state of Nirvana in a future rebirth to usher the conversion of the Emperor of Japan and the full propagation of Nichiren Shōshū to the world (Japanese: Kosen Rufu). The sect also maintains that it has never broken this ceremonial service of obligation since 10 November 1332, the day that Nikkō Shōnin passed his priestly successorship to the third High Priest, Nichimoku Shonin, and four months later was fully refined and institutionalized on 6 February 1333.

After the service, the High Priest then makes his second duty to attend and supervise another Gongyo liturgy by younger priests in training in an ancient building next door called the Mutsubo, where another Gohonzon transcribed by Nikkō Shōnin is enshrined. Younger priests take a monthly rotation to attend this required service once per week, as part of their priestly training until their full graduation as trainees.

== Description ==
The ceremonial service is named denoting the traditionalist Japanese time system between the Chinese Zodiac signs of Oxen (Japanese: Ushi) and Tiger (Japanese: Tora), translated into the Western time format between 1:00 AM and 3:00 AM. The timing is also relevant to the belief that such hours are said to represent the Buddhist beliefs on fusion of objective reality and subjective wisdom, (Japanese: Kyochi Myogo) light and darkness and the primeval forces of Yin and Yang. In addition, pious beliefs also claim that the timing serves as the most auspicious hour to invoke the Buddhist gods called Shoten Zenjin who are claimed to serve and protect the believers from negative functions that seek to obstruct their karmic fortune and Buddhahood.

The service takes place in the second floor of the Kyakuden building where they face the Ozagawari "Joza" Gohonzon transcribed by Nikkō Shōnin in honor of the peasant martyr Jinshiro, dating from 8 April 1308, along with grand wooden statues of Nichiren and his secretary Nikkō Shōnin which represents the three jewels of Buddhism as taught by the sect. This particular Gohonzon commemorates the fourteen years of passing by the persecution of Hokkeko believers by the mercenary Hei No Saimon Yoritsuna, who persecuted Nichiren's peasant disciples in the Atsuhara region in the year 1279.

Customarily, Taiko drums are beaten very loudly to awaken the solemn atmosphere. Afterwards, the High Priest is ushered by six children priests who carry six "Chouchin" lanterns (marked with the words "So–hon–zan"; 総本山; English: Headquarters) illuminating his walkway by his side. A specialized transparent window called "Yohaijo" looking into the Hoando storage where the Dai Gohonzon is enshrined is visible, where the High Priest later moves to give a shortened lecture or words of encouragement as part of the culmination of service.

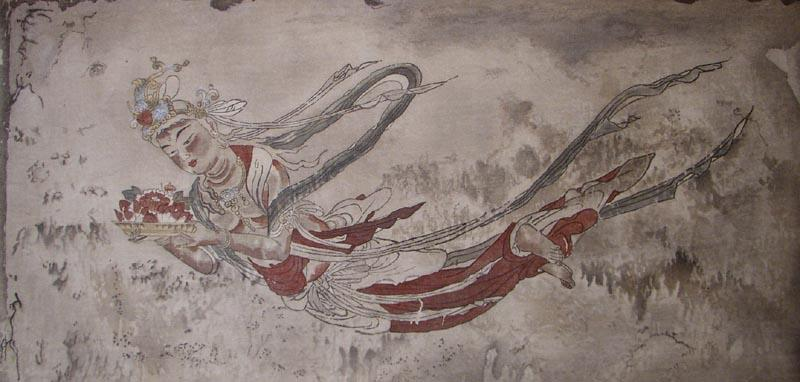
An image of a Buddhist goddess, Tennin riding a cloud, a form of Shoten Zenjin protector deity invoked by believers during the Ushitora service.

In addition, the High Priest sits on a Vertical position facing East; representing the lineage of Nichiren to Nikkō Shōnin, while the believers sit in a Horizontal position facing North, denoting the crosslining intersection taught to be the essence of heritage of the priesthood and believers in perfect unison and harmony (Japanese: Itai Doshin).

Contrary to popular belief, the service qualifies as a morning Gongyo format that is required for believers, and a repeated Gongyo during latter daytime often marks confusion as a doubled service. However, the sect teaches that only the High Priest himself may officiate the Ushitora Gongyo in its specific format, including its elongated "Hiki Daimoku" which is pronounced for each deceased High Priest of the Head Temple.

Sometime in the 1970s, the service was conducted at the western hours of 12:00 AM midnight to 1:00 AM at the request of Soka Gakkai. After its expulsion in 1991 due to doctrinal conflicts and claims of growing heresy, the 67th High Priest Nikken Shonin restored its original 2:30 AM traditional time slot in a concerted effort to restore the Head Temple to its more orthodox practices.

== In film ==
A scene of the Ushitora Gongyo is featured in the original, unedited version of the 1976 Soka Gakkai film "Zoku Ningen Kakumei" (English: Human Revolution). The fictionalized film re-dramatizes the first honorary President Tsunesaburo Makiguchi and his religious conversion to the sect of Nichiren Shōshū during the Second World War. The officiating abbot portraying in the film during the nocturnal ceremony was represented to be 60th High Priest Nichikai Shonin, the ancestral father of 67th High Priest Abe Nikken Shonin, who consequently expelled the Soka Gakkai on 28 November 1991.
