= Gohonzon =

Venerated object in Nichiren Buddhism

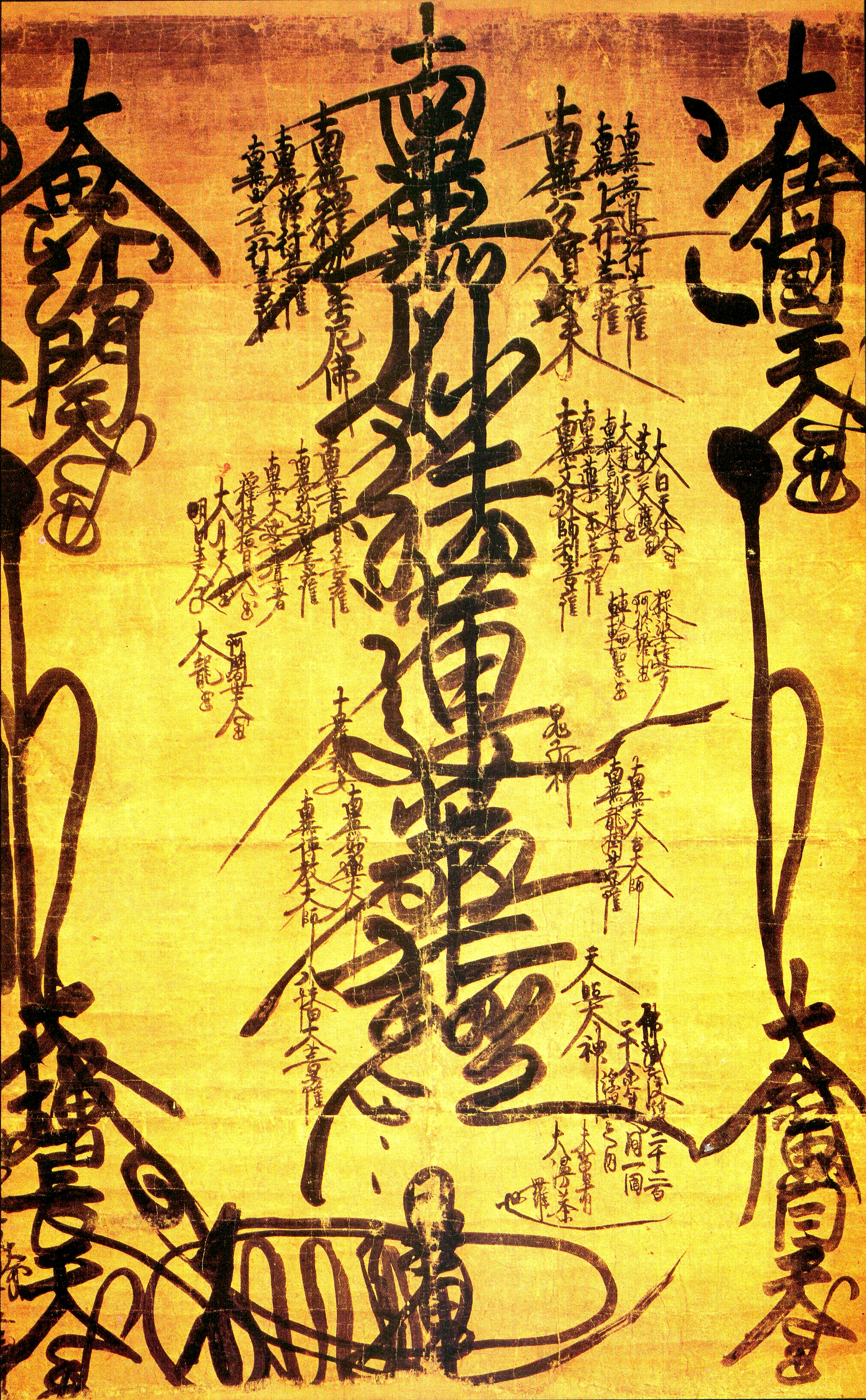
A gohonzon inscribed by Nichiren just before his death in 1280. The central logographs depict the official title of the Lotus Sūtra.

Gohonzon (御本尊; pronounced [ɡohoꜜɰ̃(d)zoɴ]) is a generic term for a venerated religious object in Japanese Buddhism. It may take the form of a scroll or statuary. The term gohonzon typically refers to the mainstream use of venerated objects within Nichiren Buddhism, referring to the calligraphic paper mandala inscribed by the 13th Japanese Buddhist priest Nichiren 日蓮 to which devotional chanting is directed.

Linguistically, the root word honzon (本尊) derives from ancient word konpon-sogyo, signifying a devotional object of respect or worship, and with the honorific go- (御) prefix.

Varying Nichiren groups accord their own meanings to the term gohonzon in different ways, signifying their treatment of the object:

- "Object of Devotion" – Soka Gakkai
- "Object of Worship" – Nichiren Shōshū
- "The Great Mandala, Venerated Supreme" – Nichiren-shū sects

Paper scroll gohonzon are sometimes known as kakejiku gohonzon or moji-mandala (文字曼荼羅, "script mandala"). The term butsuzo gohonzon is used for statuary. Gohonzon are often enshrined within an altar shrine (butsudan).

== Description ==
Nichiren himself attached the greatest importance to his inscription of the gohonzon and claimed this as a pivotal moment in his life. He stated that by using sumi ink to inscribe it, he was acting like a "lion king". Nichiren's calligraphy shifted over the years he inscribed gohonzon. Details of the composition of the gohonzon are clear from the approximately 120–125 inscribed in Nichiren's own hand, dating from 1271 to 1282, that are extant. For example, a gohonzon he inscribed in July 1273 was inscribed on a piece of silk 2.5 by 5.5 ft (0.76 by 1.68 m). Copies of the original gohonzon have been made by others and can be found in varying sizes.

A joju gohonzon is inscribed for a specific person or organization, while an okatagi gohonzon is generic and produced through a woodblock printing process. Nichiren and his successors also inscribed smaller omamori gohonzon that are carried on the person.

== Opinions on its significance ==
- Author Philip Yampolsky describes Nichiren's gohonzon as a mandala, a concretized object that Nichiren inscribed to transmit what he regarded as the essence of the Lotus Sutra. It is also described as a depiction of the Ceremony in the Air in the 11th chapter of the Lotus Sutra, "The Emergence of the Treasure Tower". It is the first of the Three Great Secret Laws of Nichiren Buddhism, the others being Nam Myōhō Renge Kyō and the platform of ordination or place of worship.
- Authors Robert Ellwood and Richard Pilgrim describe gohonzon as a "mandala of the cosmos as perceived inwardly by Nichiren."
- Masaharu Anesaki describes gohonzon as "a physical embodiment of the truth of cosmic existence as realized in the all-comprehensive conception of 'mutual participation, and illuminated by the all-enlightening power of the Truth.'"
- Jacqueline Stone claims that "By having faith in the daimoku and chanting it before this object of worship, [Nichiren taught] one could in effect enter the mandala and participate in the enlightened reality that it depicts."

The founder Nichiren referred to gohonzon as "the banner of propagation" and "a cluster of blessings."

== Calligraphic meanings ==
Without exception, all these Buddhas, bodhisattvas, great sages, and, in general, all the various beings of the two worlds and the eight groups who appear in the "Introduction" chapter of the Lotus Sutra dwell in this Gohonzon. Illuminated by the light of the five characters of the Mystic Law, they display the dignified attributes that they inherently possess. This is the object of devotion.

— Nichiren, The True Aspect of the Gohonzon

A Nichiren gohonzon is usually written in traditional kanji characters with the addition of two Siddhaṃ scripts. Although exclusive to the other Buddhist sects of his contemporaneous society, Nichiren was highly inclusive of Vedic and Chinese traditions, viewing them as precursors of his own teachings and personages from these traditions are present on the gohonzon.

Most prominent to all such gohonzon is the phrase Namu Myōhō Renge Kyō—the primary mantra in Nichiren Buddhism—written down the center in bold calligraphy. This is called the daimoku (題目) or shudai (主題, "title"). Right below, also in bold, Nichiren writes his name followed by his seal. This signifies Nichiren's conviction that his life had manifested the essence of the Lotus Sutra.

On the top row can be found the names of Shakyamuni Buddha and Prabhutaratna and the four leaders of the Bodhisattvas of the Earth. The names of deities believed to protect the Buddha Land, called the Four Heavenly Kings (Bishamonten, Jikokuten, Kōmokuten, and Zōjōten), further occupy the four corners, and Sanskrit characters depicting Aizen Myō-ō and Fudō Myō-ō are situated along the left and right outer edges. Within this frame are the names of various Buddhas, bodhisattvas, historical and mythological figures in Buddhism, personages representing the ten realms, and deities drawn from Vedic, Chinese, and Japanese traditions are arranged hierarchically. Each of these names represents some aspect of the Buddha's enlightenment or an important Buddhist concept.

== History ==
Research has documented that Nichiren inscribed 740 gohonzon. He began inscribing gohonzon immediately before and during his exile on Sado between late 1271 and early 1274. This follows the attempted and failed execution of him at Tatsunokuchi Beach in 1271. In various letters he referred to this event as his "casting off the transient and revealing the true" (hoshaku-kempon), at which time he claimed to have discarded his transient status and revealed his essential identity as the Buddha of the Latter Day of the Law. According to Ikeda, Nichiren's intent in manifesting the gohonzon was to allow people to connect directly with the Dharma so they, too, could discard the transient and reveal their essential enlightened selves.

The first extant gohonzon was inscribed by Nichiren on 12 October 1271 before his transport to Sado Island. Stone describes it as embryonic in form. On 8 July 1273, Nichiren inscribed a gohonzon in its full form with the inscription "Nichiren inscribes this for the first time."

During his exile in Sado Island (1271–1274) Nichiren wrote two treatises explaining the significance of the object of devotion from the theoretical perspectives of the person (The Opening of the Eyes) and the Dharma (The Object of Devotion for Observing the Mind). Nichiren wrote additional letters to his followers bestowing gohonzon to them and further explaining their significance: "Letter to Misawa", "Reply to Kyo'o", "The Real Aspect of the Gohonzon", and "On the Treasure Tower".

== The gohonzon issue of Soka Gakkai ==
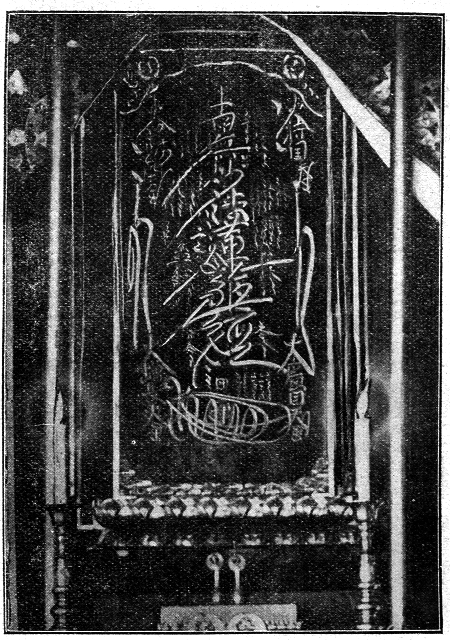
Early photograph of the Dai-Gohonzon at Taiseki-ji Temple. Printed in Kumada Ijō's book Nichiren Shōnin (1913). This mandala is the artistic source of transcribed gohonzon copied both in Nichiren Shōshū, Kenshōkai and Soka Gakkai.

The Nichiren Shōshū religion claims that the original Dai Gohonzon mandala at its head temple is the original source of power that is transcribed by the High Priests of Nichiren Shoshu. All gohonzon loaned by Nichiren Shōshū are copied from the Dai Gohonzon, including the ones currently used by Kenshōkai for their services.

On 28 November 1991, the Soka Gakkai was expelled by Nichiren Shōshū and thereby lost its source of gohonzon. By September 1993, the Soka Gakkai began to manufacture their own version and artistic format used today for current members. A gohonzon transcribed by Nichikan Shōnin, the 26th chief abbot of Taiseki-ji was selected through one of the dissident breakaway priest who provided the woodblock copy when he sided with President Daisaku Ikeda.

The gohonzon used today by Soka Gakkai was copied and transcribed from the Dai Gohonzon in July 1720 by Nichikan Shōnin (1665–1726), the twenty-sixth High Priest of Nichiren Shōshū. Another gohonzon in possession of the Soka Gakkai is the wooden copy manufactured in 1974 transcribed from the Dai Gohonzon by 64th High Priest Nissho Shōnin, previously enshrined in Osaka, and now enshrined in the main SGI headquarters of Daiseido Hall in Shinjuku, Tokyo, Japan.

- Former Soka Gakkai President Jōsei Toda described the gohonzon simply as "a happiness-producing machine", a means for harmonizing with "universal life force".
- Former President of Soka Gakkai International Mr. Daisaku Ikeda refererred to the gohonzon as a mirror.

=== Inscriptions ===
The following inscriptions are found in the gohonzon transcribed by 26th High Priest Nichikan Shōnin, as is the mainstream format also transcribed by the Successive High Priests of Nichiren Shōshū:

- Nichiren Daishōnin: – Butsumetsugo ni-sen hi-hyaku san-ju yo nen no aida ichienbudai no uchi misou no daimandara nari. "Never in 2,230-some years since the passing of the Buddha has this great mandala appeared in the world."
- Nichikan Shonin: – Kyojo go-nen roku-gatsu jusan-nichi "The 13th day of the sixth month in the fifth year of Kyoho, cyclical sign kanoe-ne."

There are also two inscriptions from Miao-lo's commentary Hokke Mongu, The Annotations on "The Words and Phrases of the Lotus Sutra":

- U kuyo sha Fuku ka jugo – "Those who make offerings will gain good fortune surpassing the ten honorable titles [of the Buddha]."
- Nyaku noran sha zu ha shichibun – "Those who vex and trouble [the practitioners of the Law] will have their heads split into seven pieces."

The Soka Gakkai organization maintains that only the gohonzon conferred by their leadership brings both personal happiness and kosen-rufu, claiming that they possess the true mandate of Nichiren for widespread propagation.

By contrast, Nichiren Shōshū Hokkekō members often omit the honorific term go- (御) when referring to gohonzon used outside their religion, most especially against the Soka Gakkai variant either as a pejorative derision or refusal to acknowledge the implied sacred nature of the gohonzon outside their sectarian beliefs, often citing them as either fake and lacking the aigen-shu ("eye-opening") ceremony prescribed to animate a gohonzon for its spiritual efficacy. The lesser value of honzon is used by Nichiren Shōshū members instead.

== Outside of Nichiren Buddhism ==
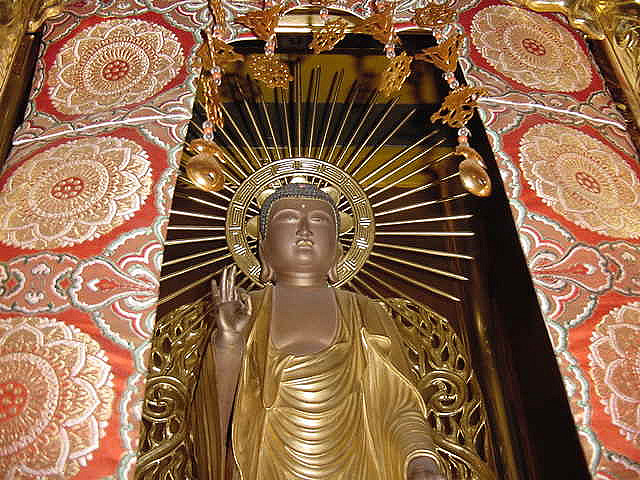
An example of butsuzo gohonzon in Pure Land Buddhism featuring Amitābha

The terms honzon and gohonzon are often used interchangeably and with some confusion. In the Japanese new religion Risshō Kōsei Kai, members receive and practice to a Daigohonzon enshrined in their homes; the scroll consists of an image of Gautama Buddha. At the Risshō Kōsei Kai headquarters there is a gohonzon that is a statue of Shakyamuni.

In the Jōdo Shinshū school of Pure Land Buddhism, under Hōnen and Shinran, the use of honzon became more prevalent; they took the form of inscriptions of the sect's mantra Namu Amida Butsu, other phrases, images of the Buddha, statuary, and even representations of the founder. Rennyo thought the written mantra was more appropriate than a statue but did not ascribe particular powers to it as do Nichiren's followers to their gohonzon.

In Mikkyō practices such as in Shingon Buddhism, the term honzon refers to the divinity honored in a rite but later came to represent the formal object of worship. The tutelary figure's role is similar to that of the yidam in Tibetan Buddhism. Tutelary deities in Vajrayana, including Mikkyō, Chinese Esoteric Buddhism and Tibetan Buddhism, are crucial to many religious practices. In the famous goma fire ritual ceremony, the fire itself, while it is being consumed and animated, is also considered a temporary gohonzon.

== See also ==
- Kotodama
