= Taiseki-ji =

Buddhist temple in Shizuoka Prefecture, Japan

Head Temple Taiseki-ji
- 多宝富士大日蓮華山 大石寺
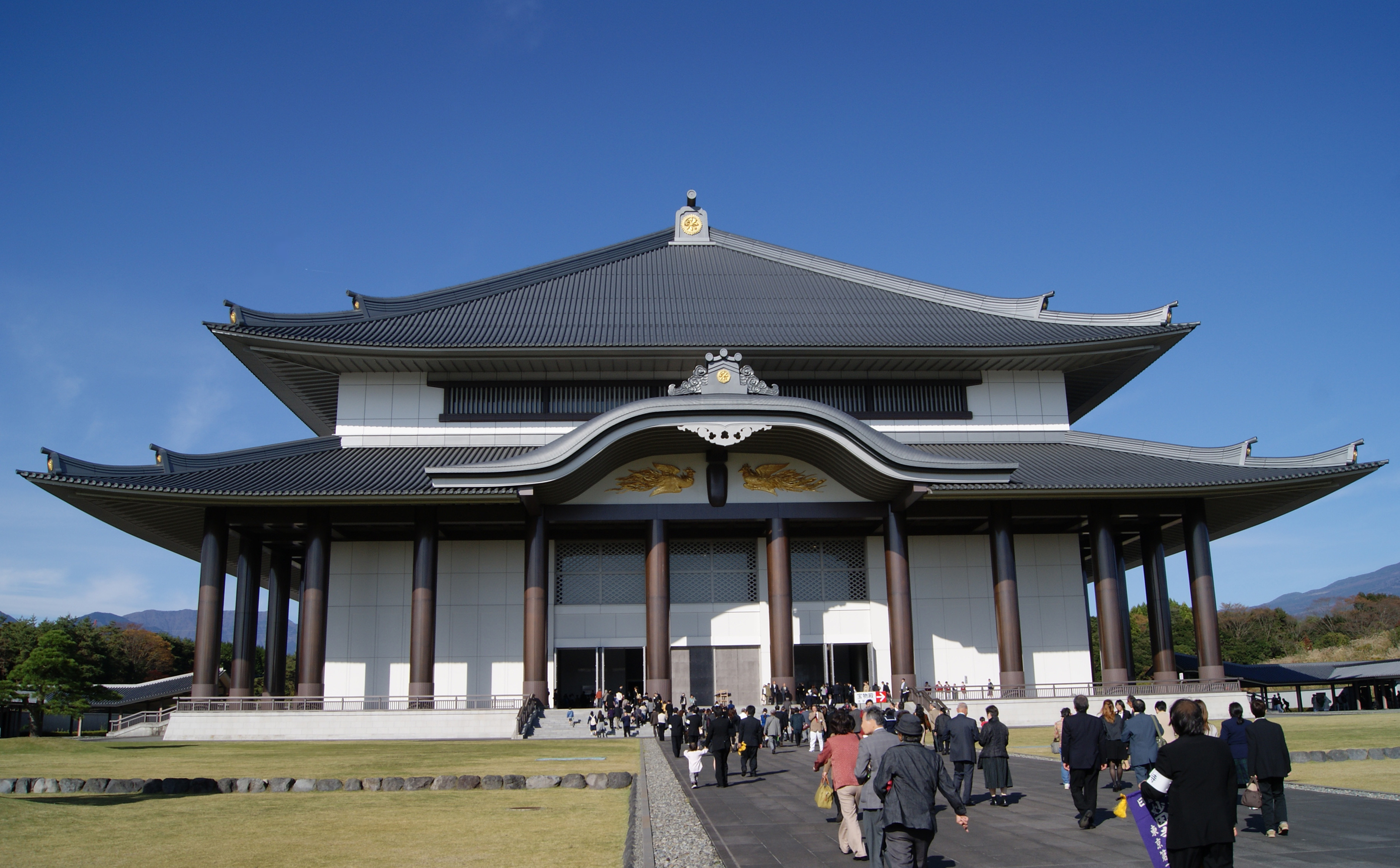
- The Hōandō

Religion
- Affiliation: Buddhism
- Sect: Nichiren Shōshū
- Deity: The "Dai Gohonzon of the High Sanctuary of the Essential Teachings"

Location
- Location: Foot of Mount Fuji in Fujinomiya, Shizuoka prefecture
- Country: Japan
- Interactive map of Head Temple Taiseki-ji
- Coordinates: 35°16′56″N 138°35′09″E

Architecture
- Founder: Nikkō Shonin
- Groundbreaking: 1290

Website
- http://www.nichirenshoshu.or.jp/

Tahō Fuji Dainichirenge-san Taiseki-ji (多宝富士大日蓮華山 大石寺), more commonly just Sōhonzan Taiseki-ji (総本山大石寺), informally known as Head Temple Taiseki-ji (大石寺), is the administrative center of Nichiren Shoshu Buddhism. It is located in the foothills of Mount Fuji in Kamijo, Fujinomiya, Shizuoka Prefecture, Japan. Taiseki-ji was founded in 1290 by Nikkō Shōnin, one of Nichiren Daishonin's senior disciples, on a land parcel donated by the pious believer Daigyo Sonrei, commonly known as Nanjo Tokimitsu (1259–1332).

The Head Temple is the home of the Dai Gohonzon, Nichiren Shoshu's object of worship, which draws pilgrim believers from various countries. The temple's open grounds are open to the public for sightseeing, though its religious buildings are restricted only to registered believers. Accordingly, adherents of the Soka Gakkai are not permitted entrance to the Head Temple grounds.

== Description ==
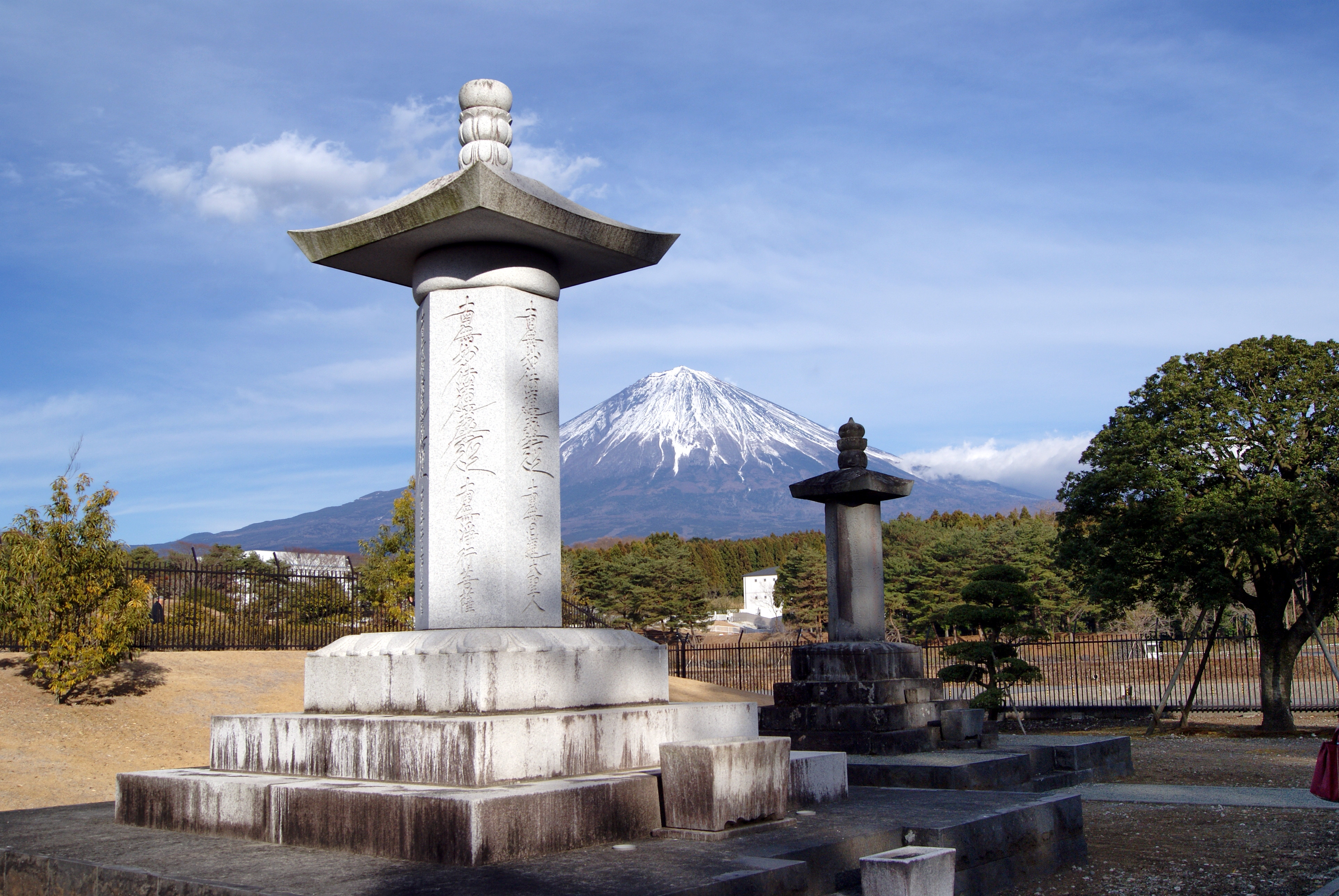
The Rokumanto, two Buddhist Stupas erected by 24th High Priest Nichiei Shonin (1704) and another by 67th High Priest Nikken Shonin (1994) representing Bodhisattva Visistacaritra and the 60,000 Ganges Rivers preached by Shakyamuni Buddha within the Chapter 15 of the Lotus Sutra.

Taiseki-ji is Nichiren Shoshu's administrative center, and its chief abbot (貫主, Kanzu) Chief Priest is simultaneously the high priest (法主 (Hossu)) of Nichiren Shoshu. The current 68th High Priest is Nichinyo Hayase (1935 – Present) who assumed the position on 16 December 2005.

Taiseki-ji is the home of the Dai Gohonzon, Nichiren Shoshu's object of worship. This image is visited by believers who come on personal pilgrimages, to participate in regular ceremonies, or to take part in large events such as study programs, and similar large meetings. The temple is known for numerous historically significant buildings and gardens, national cultural assets, as well as features like the old weeping cherry trees that line its Tatchū Sando (main path lined with lodging temples).

== History ==
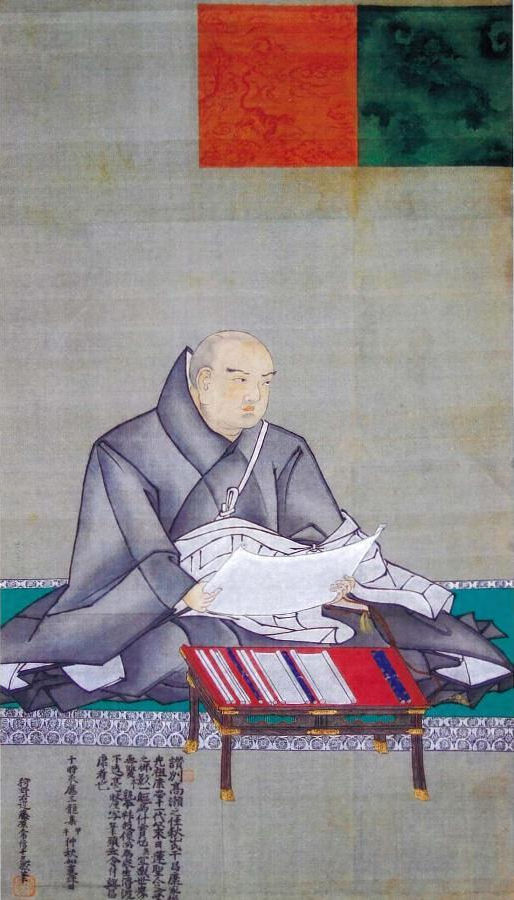
Portrait of Nichiren Daishonin by Japanese artisan Kano Tsunenobu (1636—1713), now preserved at Nichiren Shoshu Honmonji Temple in Mitoyo, Kagawa prefecture. Measuring approximately 40” inches by 22” inches on silk, Edo period.

According to Nichiren Shoshu tradition, Taiseki-ji was founded in 1290 by Nichiren's disciple Nikkō on a tract of land called Ōishigahara (大石ケ原 "great stone meadow") donated by the district steward, Nanjo Shichiro Jiro Hyoe Taira no Tokimitsu (Buddhist name: Daigyo Sonrei) (1259–1332). The name derives from an alternative reading of the kanji for Ōishi (大石), Tai (Big) - Seki (Stone), and the character Ji (寺), temple.

Tokimitsu was a lay follower of Nichiren's and consequently Nikko Shonin. Taiseki-ji started with one small temple building, the Mutsubo with six rooms, but grew gradually as Nikkō's disciples built sub-temples. It went through further growth phases during the mid-Edo period and after the Second World War.

According to Nichiren Shoshu doctrine, their religious founder Nichiren willed that the image be established with a national shrine at the foot of Mount Fuji with a special title named "Honmonji" when the conversion of the Japanese Emperor and widespread propagation was achieved.

Due to its strong prohibition against accepting monetary donations from non-believers, there is no offertory box available at the temple. Believers are confirmed to be registered members before they are allowed to give "Gokuyo" or offerings. There is also no Goshuincho (御朱印帳 or "red stamping" of Daimoku or Talisman booklets normally sold to tourists, considered by the religion to be a form of sacrilege.

In addition, neither the Head Temple nor the religious stores outside Taiseki-ji accept any currency besides Japanese Yen towards any donation offerings, memorial service fees, food and lodging fees or any religious merchandise transactions.

== Activities at the Head Temple ==
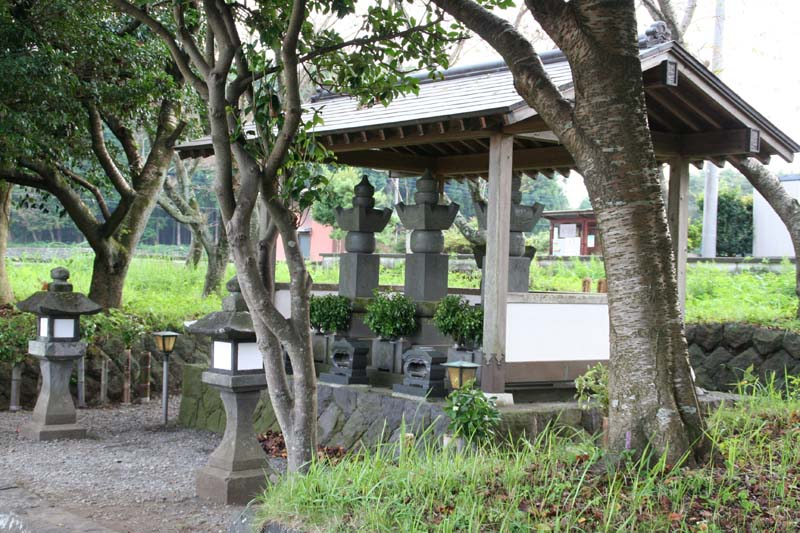
The gravestone Stupa of Lord Nanjo Tokimitsu, land donor of Taisekiji. By the Myorenji Temple.

=== Gongyo ===
The Buddhist service of "Gongyo" (勤行, Persevering Action) is the basic supplemental service of Hokkeko believers. It is conducted first as the Ushitora Gongyo at the Dai Kyakuden (Grand Reception Hall), among other places throughout the Head Temple. In past centuries, the service was performed in five different locations:

- Facing the sunrise direction
- Facing the Mieido
- Facing the Gohozo
- Facing the Kyakuden
- Facing the Mutsubo

The sect, along with the other Fuji sects in the area, followed the custom of reciting the Sutra chapters according to what Nichiren himself once did:

- Junyoze — Reciting the prose (散文, "Sanbun") of Chapter 2
- Seoge — Reciting the verse (自我偈, "Jigage") of Chapter 2
- Chogyo — Reciting the prose ("Sanbun") of Chapter 16
- Nyorai Juryo — Reciting the verse ("Jigage") of Chapter 16

During the 1930s, the Gongyo service was shortened to a single format, initiated by religious convert Tsunesaburo Makiguchi and was approved by 57th High Priest Nissho Shonin. Today, some Nichiren sects in the Mount Fuji area recite the full versions of the 2nd and 16th Chapter of the Lotus Sutra.

The current version of Gongyo since the 1930s is the recitations of Chapter 2 in prose and Chapter 16 in prose and verse along with the five morning and three evening silent prayers (五座三座, Goza-Sanza) for the purpose of the following:

1. Receiving protection from the Buddhist gods (Shoten Zenjin)
2. Prayer to the Dai Gohonzon
3. Prayer for lineage of the priesthood
4. Conversion of the Emperor of Japan and widespread propagation
5. Prayers for deceased ancestors and their rebirth in Hokkeko

Additional services such as funeral, prolonged chanting (Shodai) and other commemoration ceremonies for historical personalities associated with the Head Temple are also conducted.

=== Tozan pilgrimages ===
Pilgrimage to Taiseki-ji draws adherents of Nichiren Shoshu annually through group trips that are planned by local branch temples, as well as private individual trips. This pilgrimage in the sectarian parlance is called "Tozan" (登山, "Mountaineering, to climb the mountain") for the purpose of worshipping the Dai Gohonzon in person. The sect bases this practice in the ancient custom of early supporters of Nichiren who also visited him during his lifetime over perilous roads and mountains, now re-interpreted as a similar pilgrimage towards the Dai Gohonzon, which represents Nichiren in a mandala format.

=== The Gokaihi ceremony ===
In Japan, a "Gokaihi" (御開扉, English: "Sacred Opening of (Butsudan) Doors") is a ceremonial rite that exposes a particular sacred Buddhist image that is hidden and revered in a particular religion or sect. In Nichiren Shoshu ritual practices, this refers to the ceremonial audience with the Dai Gohonzon officiated by the High Priest granted to Hokkeko believers who have personally requested to participate, which is oftentimes the main purpose of a pilgrimage visit to the Head Temple. The volition of free will, confirmation of registered membership and an offertory fee is part of the protocol to enter the Hoando building to participate in the service.

== List of buildings ==
The following significant buildings are listed for their historical and architectural value:

=== Sanmon gate ===
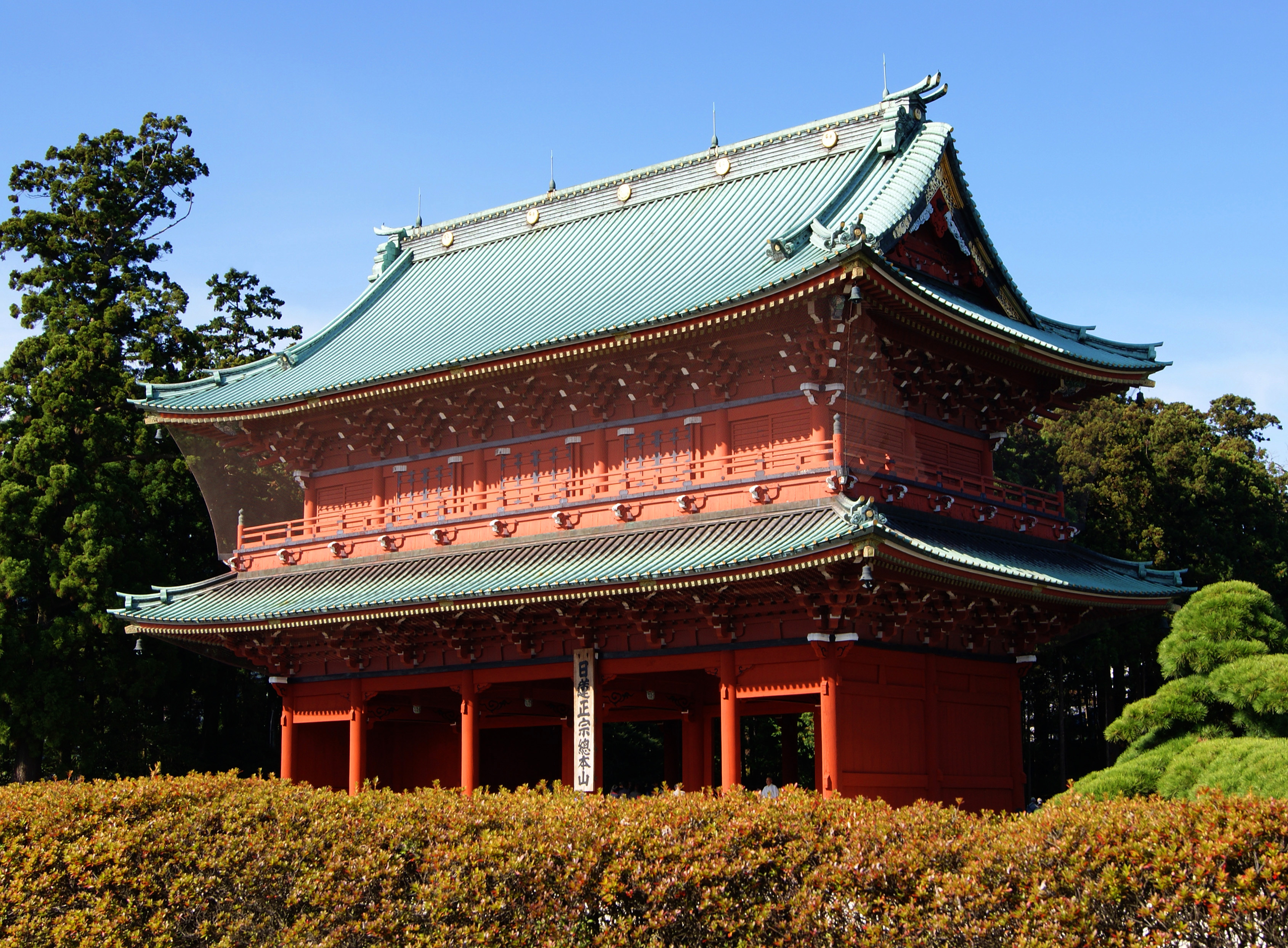
The Sanmon gate (older model)

The Sanmon (written 三門, sometimes 山門) gate is Taiseki-ji's "main front door" and has been designated as a Shizuoka prefectural cultural asset. It was built in 1717 with financial assistance from Lady Hiroko Konoe (also known as “Tennei-in”), the daughter of Imperial Princess Tsuneko and wife of sixth Shōgun Tokugawa Ienobu. A Gohonzon transcribed by 25th High Priest Nichiyu Shonin is enshrined within its upper floor. At the time, she donated 300 ryō for its construction. Positioned next to public government roads, it was significantly vandalized and defaced with graffiti in 1997. It was recently restored, and its Gohonzon was ceremoniously re-enshrined within again on 15 January 2021.

=== Mutsubō ===
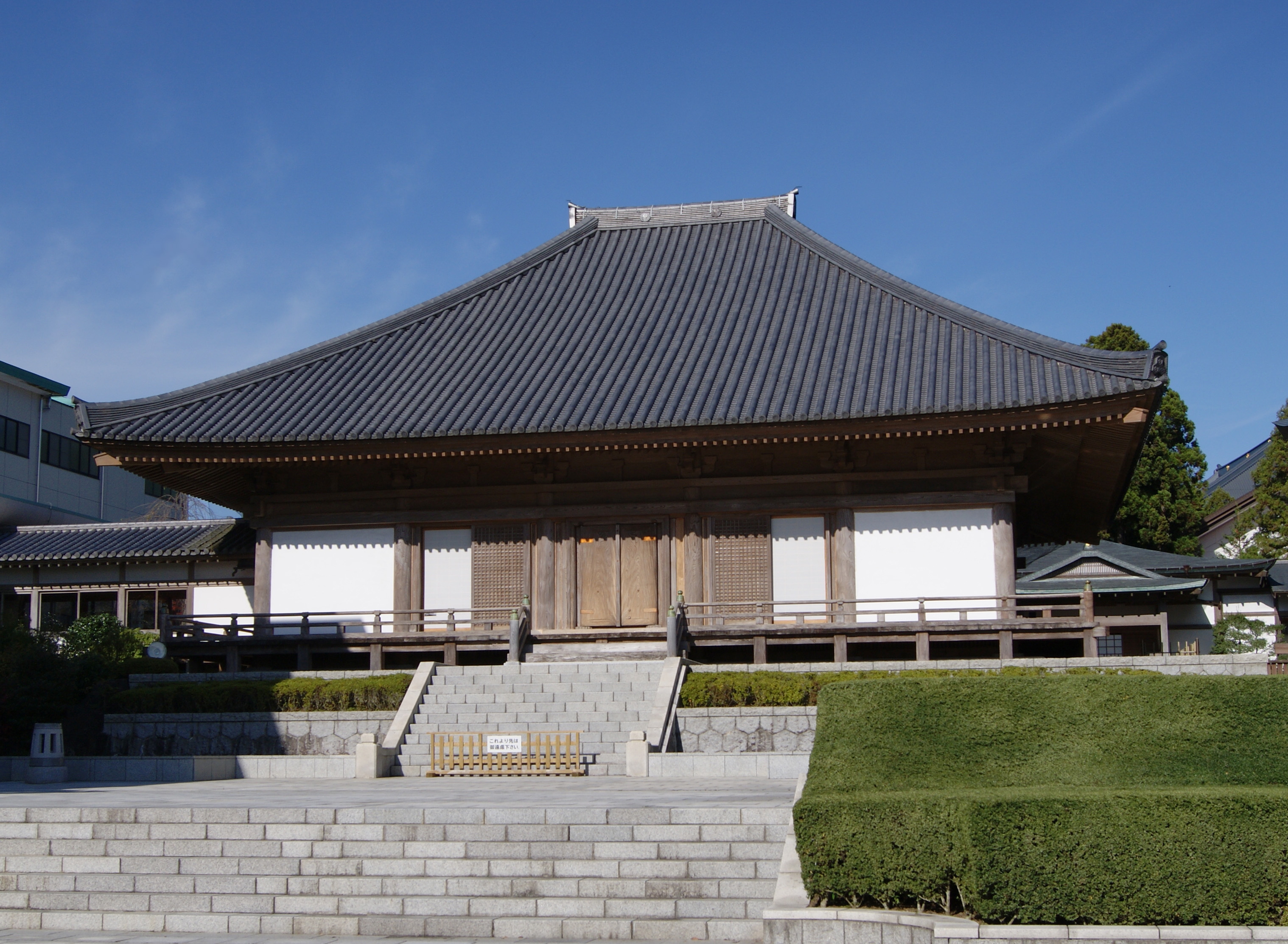
The Mutsubō

The first Mutsubō (六壷) was erected in 1290 as Taiseki-ji's first building. It has been rebuilt many times since, but the Gohonzon (object of veneration) it houses is attributed to temple founder Nikkō Shōnin dating from November 1332. It maintains its original design of having six rooms. The current structure, which uses much keyaki heartwood, was completed in 1988. The High Priest of Nichiren Shoshu proceeds to the Mutsubō on concluding Ushitora Gongyo in the Kyakuden (see below) to perform another gongyo recitation with young priests and acolytes.

=== Kyakuden ===
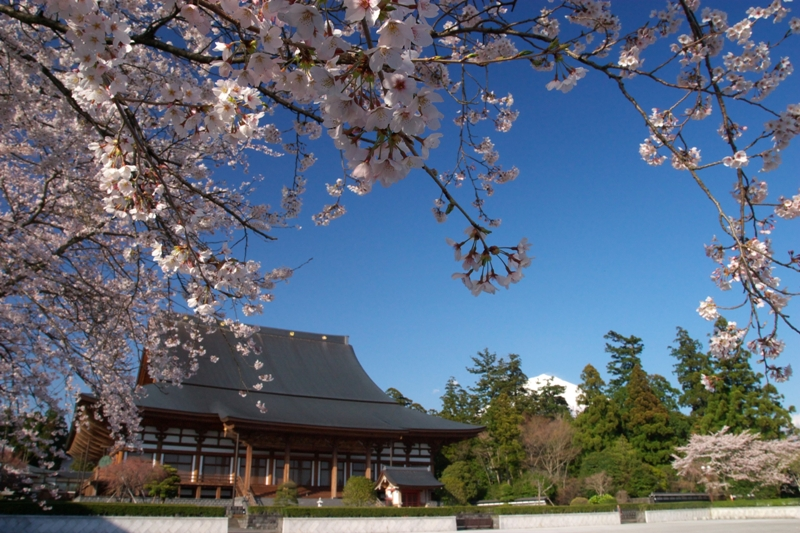
Cherry blossoms near the Kyakuden

The Kyakuden (客殿 "Reception Hall") is one of the central structures where the majority of ceremonies are held, including Ushitora Gongyo by each successive High Priest every morning. It was built in 1465 and later rebuilt in 1998.

The Kyakuden was rebuilt as the Dai-Kyakuden (大客殿 "Grand Reception Hall"), with the assistance of the Soka Gakkai, a modern-style building inaugurated April 1964. That structure, was demolished in September 1995 and rebuilt as the current Kyakuden in 1998 with its wood-clad steel-framed edifice. The priesthood cited the Dai-Kyakuden's imposing ferroconcrete mass as incongruent with the architectural tone appropriate for a temple compound.

The Kyakuden is the site of Ushitora Gongyo, a daylight prayer service officiated by the High Priest or his proxy. The Ozagawari Joza Gohonzon, original paper on 13 October 1290 ("Gohonzon of the Seat of the Dharma") was rendered into wood and carved on 15 June 1706, now enshrined on the central altar on the second floor of the Kyakuden.

This 1706 wooden mandala is flanked by lifesize statues of Nichiren Daishonin (left) and Nikkō Shōnin (right) as a symbolic representation of “San—Po” or “Three Treasures style”, though the “Object of Worship” remains the central mandala. The two grand statues were carved in 1660 during the reign of 17th High Priest Nissei Shonin.

=== Mieidō ===
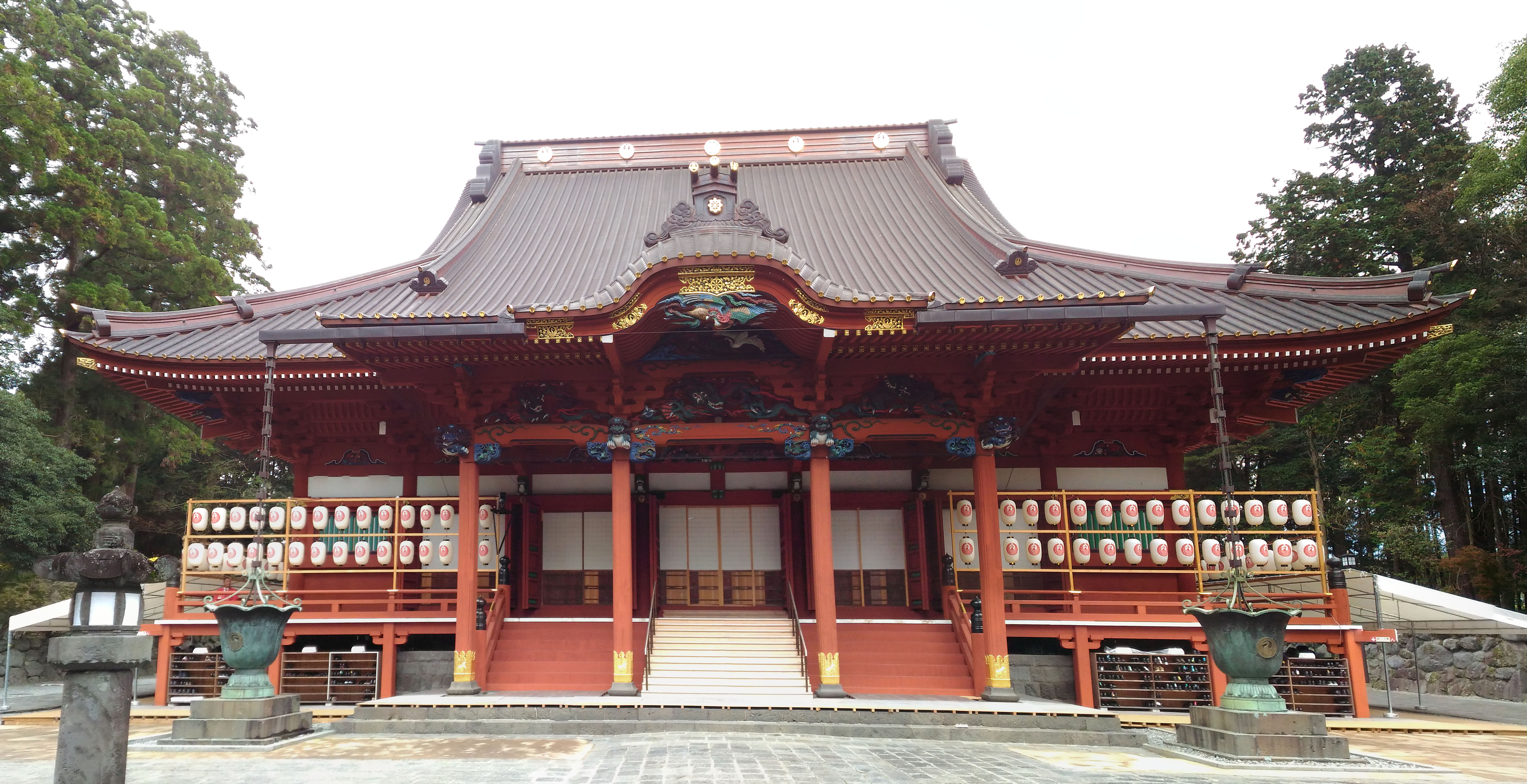
The Mieido Image Hall

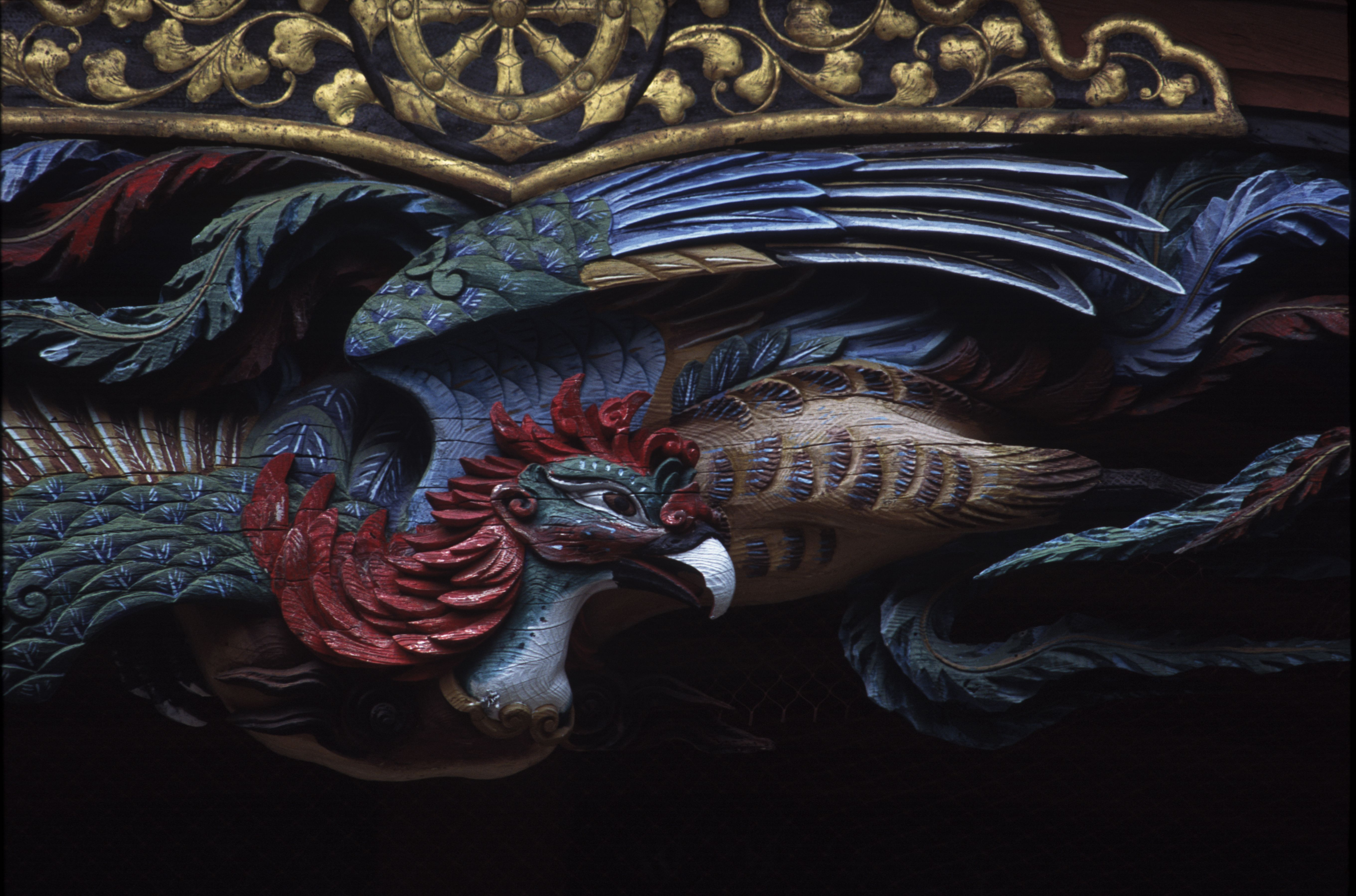
A carving of a Fenghuang rooster on an Mieido Image Hall transom

The Mieido (image hall, 御影堂) is the hondō (本堂) or main official hall of Taisekiji temple. It traces its history to a building called the Mido (Midō: 御堂) erected by Nikko Shonin when he founded Taisekiji in 1290. It takes its name from a lifesize image of Nichiren sculpted by Japanese Buddhist artisan Echizen Hōkyō Kaikei, a carver of Buddhist images. This image was enshrined in the year 1388 in a building that was then replaced in 1522. The current, classical structure was erected in 1632 with donations from the Lady Manhime Ogasawara (Also known as Kyōdai-in), who was the wife of Lord Hachisuka Yoshishige of the Tokushima Castle.. The building is designed similarly to a Kabuki-za theater filled with various ornaments. In 1680 (Enpō year), the Dai Gohonzon image was stored here for safekeeping. An enlarged statue of Nichiren is enshrined in front of the Mandala as the aesthetic of the building represents various Buddhist images.

Several rounds of expansions, improvements, and repairs have been undertaken since then, and it was designated a prefectural tangible cultural property by Shizuoka Prefecture after major repairs in 1971. The most recent overhaul was finished in November 2013. The seven-year project entailed completely breaking down and reassembling the building piece by piece. All the parts were catalogued, mapped, and their condition recorded. Damaged structural members were repaired or replaced, and decorative fixtures such as transom carvings and other artwork, were painstaking restored. When the building was reassembled, aseismic structural augmentation (dampers) was installed to protect it from earthquake damage. New gold leaf was applied to the indoor pillars, and all exposed surfaces were finished with vermilion using traditional methods. The building is known for its decorative transoms that depict various Buddhist deities that are believed to occupy the Treasure Tower of the Lotus Sutra. A decorative Stupa is erected nearby the Mieido to commemorate the donations of Lady Manhime Ogasawara remains present to this day.

=== Hōandō ===
The Hōandō (奉安堂) Enshrinement Hall, built in 2002, houses the Dai Gohonzon of the High Sanctuary of the Essential Teaching, the supreme object of worship in Nichiren Shōshū. The Hōandō is built in the style of a Kura storehouse to signify that the Nichiren Shoshu faith has not yet taken hold as the primary religion of the world's people. Nichiren Shoshu claims that Nichiren willed that the Dai Gohonzon is not to be made publicly accessible, but rather stored away and only viewed by those who have asked for and been granted an audience by the High Priest, until such time. Another interpretation of this is that, as different from all other Nichiren Shoshu altars, the one in the Hōandō has neither offerings of evergreens nor drums, and non-believers are not permitted entry. Handicapped believers and their attendants are given priority entry and seating within the building.

On the high altar, the Shumidan, of the Hōandō is a Buddhist Stupa containing the ashes of Nichiren Daishonin (left), a grand Butsudan housing the Dai Gohonzon (center), and another stupa containing a statue of Nichiren Daishonin carved by Izumi Ajari Nippō Shōnin from the same camphorwood leftover plank that the Dai Gohonzon was inscribed on; while pious tradition claims that Nichiren approvingly characterized the statue as an exact image of himself.

Taiseki-ji has traditionally regarded the Mieidō (see above) as the temple's Hondō (main hall), but only its provisional main hall until wide propagation is achieved, when the building housing the Dai Gohonzon would take over that role.

The Hōandō replaced the controversial name of the Shōhondō (正本堂: true main hall), after its demolition in April 1998. (See below for details on demolished buildings)

=== Gohōzō and Hōanden ===
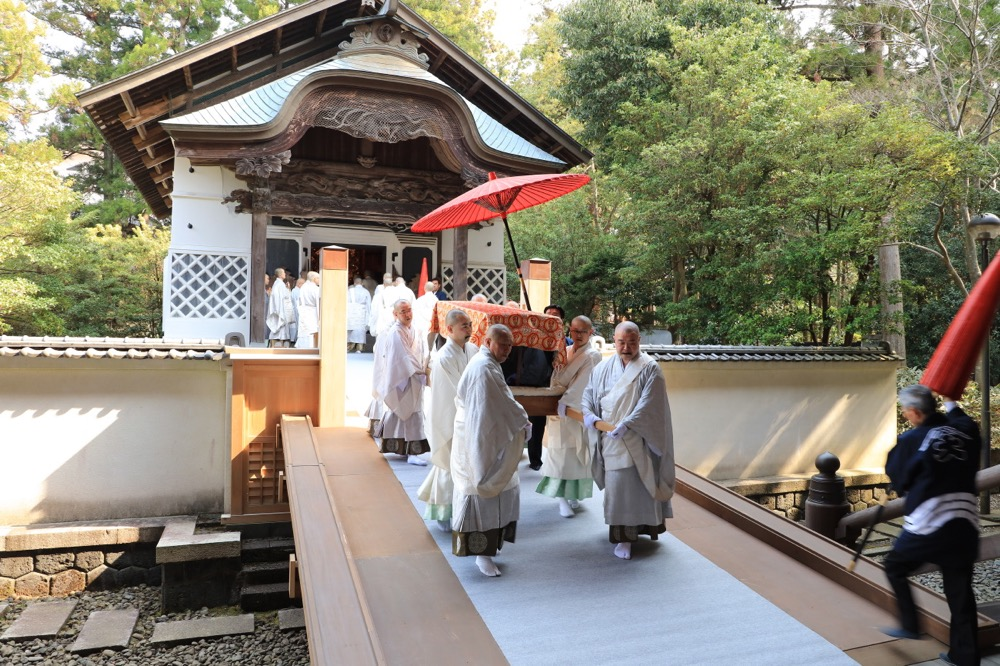
Numerous relics from Taiseki-ji's 750-year history are kept in the Gohōzō Treasure House.

The Gohōzō (御宝蔵) ("Treasure House") houses various religious scrolls and paintings, and other religious and historical records, relics, and artifacts. It possesses the original Gosho documents of Nichiren conversing with the Buddhist deity Hachiman, as well as a personal letter given to Lord Nanjo Tokimitsu while he was alive. In addition, all Gohonzons transcribed by Nichiren Shoshu priests are stored within this building, which are mostly taken out in April for the Omushibarai Ceremony.

In addition, it also features modest displays of cultural objects donated by pilgrims from countries where they have attracted converts. The Hōanden (奉安殿) building, where the Dai Gohonzon was once enshrined, stands behind it.

=== Gojunoto pagoda ===
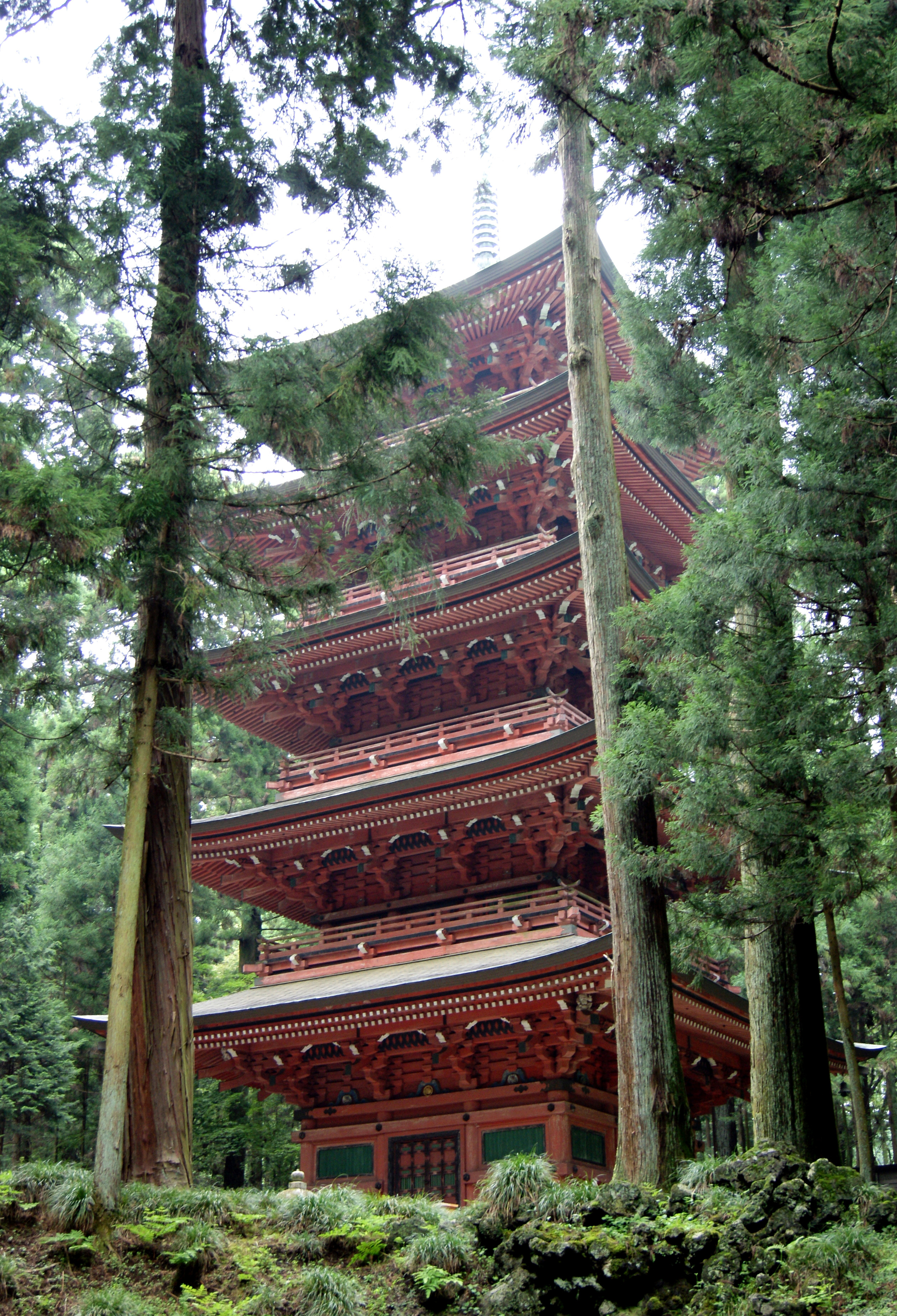
The Gojunoto pagoda

Completed on 12 June 1749 with the assistance of the Japanese Edo government, this religious pagoda was built with donations of 5,000 gold Ryō given by the daughter of Imperial Princess Tsuneko. Her daughter, the Lady Hiroko Konoe (also known as Tennei-in), who was the wife of Ienobu Tokugawa, the sixth Tokugawa Shogun gave this donation with the solemn approval of Nichikan Shonin, the 26th High Priest.

It has five stories representing the characters of 妙法蓮華經 (English: “Myo-Ho-Ren-Ge-Kyo”) measuring at 112 feet and faces west rather than the usual south, with a claim that Nichiren's Buddhism would spread from the East (Japan) to the Western lands; that is, back to the land of Shakyamuni Buddha and to the rest of the world.

This pagoda is the largest five-storied pagoda along the Tōkaidō, the historical main highway along Japan's eastern seaboard from Edo (today's Tokyo) to Kyoto. A Gohonzon transcribed by 31st High Priest Nichi-in Shonin is enshrined within, dated to 28 March 1749.

In 1966, the pagoda was designated a national cultural treasure. In 2017, it was structurally reinforced and artistically restored. Its doors are ceremoniously opened once each year on February 16 to celebrate Nichiren's birthday for the “O-tanjo ceremony”, followed by the formal opening of its doors called the “O-tobiraki ceremony”.

=== Graves ===
- On the left rear of the Pagoda is the 1945 grave and Stupa of the first Soka Gakkai President Tsunesaburo Makiguchi.
- The second Soka Gakkai president Josei Toda is located at the left front of the pagoda. His ashes were moved from Jozai-ji temple (Toshima, Tokyo), and re—interred here in 2001.
- The debonair actor Keiichirō Akagi (1939—1961) is also buried at the L-2 ward section of the head temple cemetery, nearby the Pagoda.

=== Daikōdō ===
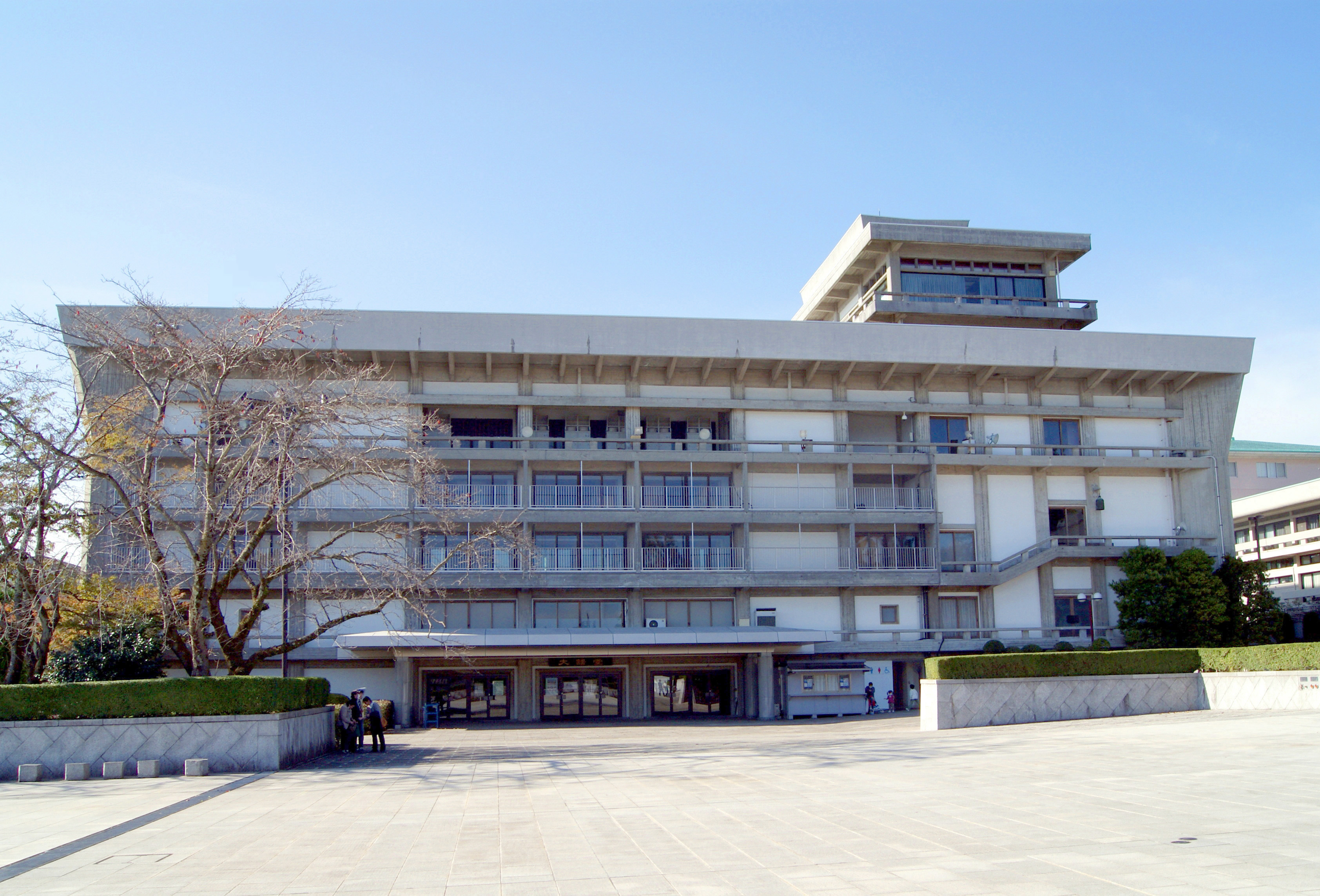
The Daikōdō auditorium, built by the Soka Gakkai on 1 March 1958. Scheduled for demolition after 2021.

The Daikōdō ("English: Grand Auditorium") was donated by Soka Gakkai, with construction began in December 1956 and completed on 1 March 1958. It houses a so-called “Mannen-Kugo” aesthetic-style design which was originally dated and inscribed by Nichiren himself in December 1274 and later co-signed by the Yoshihama Myohonji Temple located in Kyonan, Chiba prefecture.

A wooden transcription image of this Gohonzon was carved and signed by Taisekiji priest-sculptor named “Eritsu Hiki Bhikkhu” (Claimed to be Mr. Takeshi Itamoto) in January 1687 (Jōkyō year IV) assumingly in commemoration for the new incoming 30th High Priest Nitchu Shonin.

Upon the completion of this grand auditorium in 1958, the 65th High Priest Nichijun Shonin decided to enshrine this wooden Gohonzon within this building where it remains today. Presently, this Gohonzon is flanked by the two Ihai memorial tablets of second High Priest Nikkō Shonin and his successor, third High Priest Nichimoku as an expressed style aesthetic that both disciples were once able to listen to Nichiren's preaching in correlation to the purpose of the building as an Auditorium. It is in a dilapidated condition and scheduled for demolition and reconstruction after completion of the new Sanmon gate in 2021.

The former highest lay leader of Hokkeko believers (Hokkeko Sokoto), Jōsei Toda addressed youth adherents from this building on 16 March 1958.

== Demolished buildings ==
=== Shōhondō ===
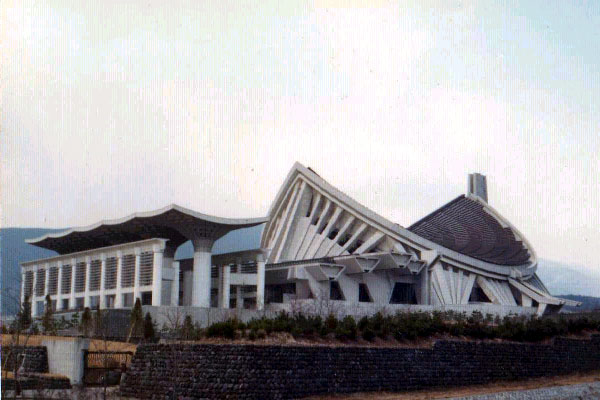
The Shōhondō, constructed in 1972, demolished in 1998

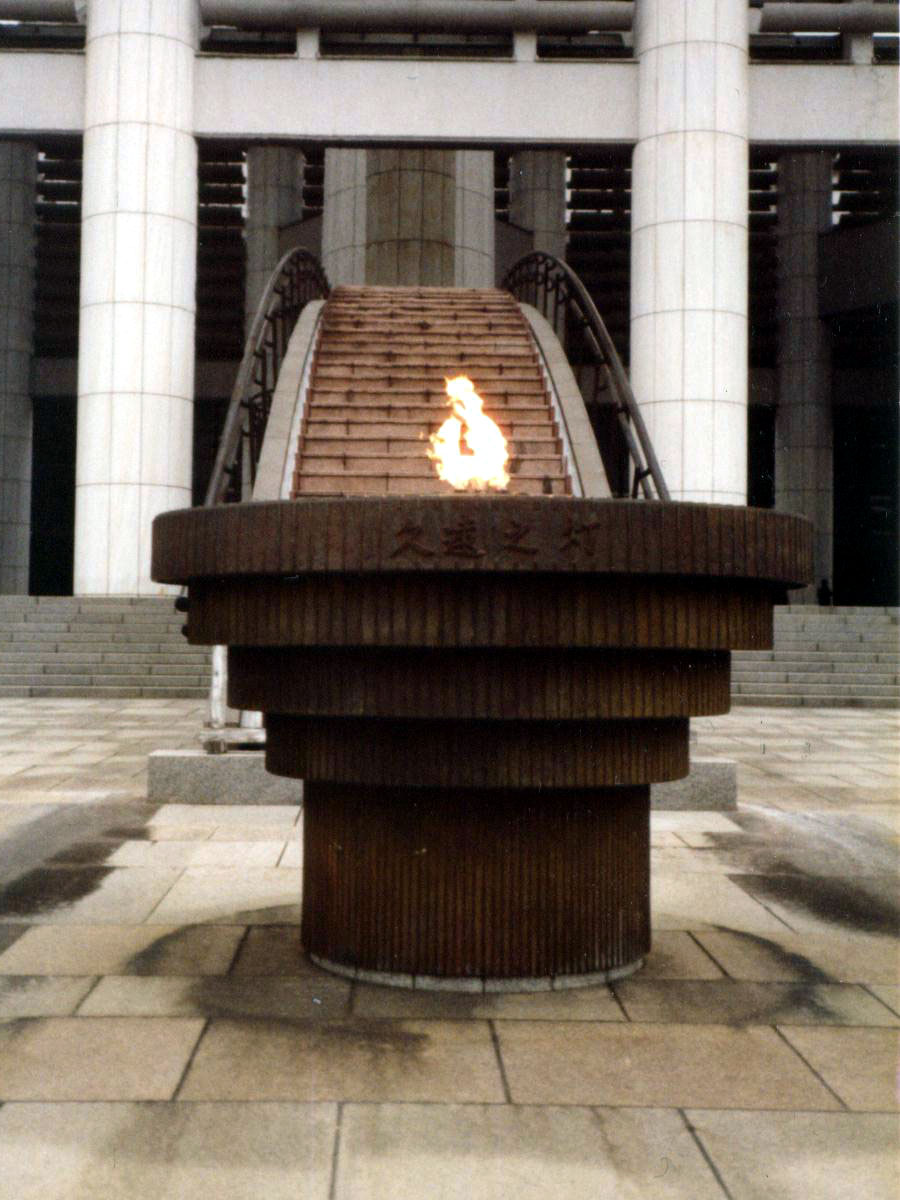
The "Eternal Flame" at the entrance of the Shōhondō (1978)

The Shōhondō (正本堂, True Main Hall) was a building at Taiseki-ji, which opened on 12 October 1972 and was subsequently demolished in 1998. Former Soka Gakkai President Daisaku Ikeda, who emphasized the building of monuments to the success of the movement, made the request to build the new structure which became the Shohondo.

Religious professor Daniel A. Métraux claims that the Soka Gakkai placed particular importance on the building of the Shohondo, based on interpretations of doctrine not shared by the Nichiren Shoshu sect as a whole, and therefore controversy over its status arose at its construction.

The Shōhondō was inaugurated by the Soka Gakkai who claimed it as the "True High Sanctuary", Kaidan, which was a title disputed by conservative groups within the sect including the Myoshinko (now known as Kenshōkai) lay organisation, and the Nichiren Shoshu Priesthood. In Nichiren Shoshu doctrine, that sanctuary title was allegedly reserved for a future temple to be built at the base of Mount Fuji on the completion of Kosen Rufu, as solely decreed by the Emperor of Japan when the entire nation has converted to Nichiren's Buddhism.

Métraux explained that the Soka Gakkai was reinterpreting doctrine and maintained that they could consider the Shōhondō as the "True High Sanctuary", Kaidan, about which Nichiren wrote, because through the Soka Gakkai Nichiren's philosophy was spread through Japan and was positively impacting people. The importance of the Shohondo was, therefore, a highly contentious matter dividing the Soka Gakkai and other factions within the faith.

High Priest Nittatsu Hosoi, clarified that the Shōhondō was not the True High Sanctuary about which Nichiren wrote, though directed the Shōhondō as a temporary home for the Dai-Gohonzon, the permanent home of the Dai-Gohonzon would be the future True High Sanctuary.

The construction of the Shōhondō was funded largely by donations from lay believers of Nichiren Shoshu. In 1968, approximately 8 million Soka Gakkai adherents contributed money to the construction. An estimated grand total of ¥35,536,000,000 was raised:

- ¥ 35,064,300,000.00 came from the Sōka Gakkai lay organization.
- ¥ 313,820,000.00 from the Hokkekō lay organization
- ¥ 157,870,000.00 from Nichiren Shoshu priests and their families.

The building was demolished in 1998, the official reason given by Nichiren Shoshu for the demolition was the discovery of rust on the pillars within the temple. Engineers discovered that ocean sand had been used in the mortar of the building, risking the Dai Gohonzon's safety during an earthquake. The school also concedes that its demolition of the Shōhondō was an extension of the doctrinal dispute between it and Sōka Gakkai, emphasizing the impiety of the organisation as heretics for deviating from its formal doctrines of orthodoxy.

American architects Richard Meier and Robert Arthur Stern both disparaged the demolition. Terence Riley, former chief curator of architecture and design at the Museum of Modern Art in New York opined that the planned demolition would be a "regrettable finale" to a century that has "witnessed so much loss".

== Nearby buildings ==
=== Myoren-ji Temple ===
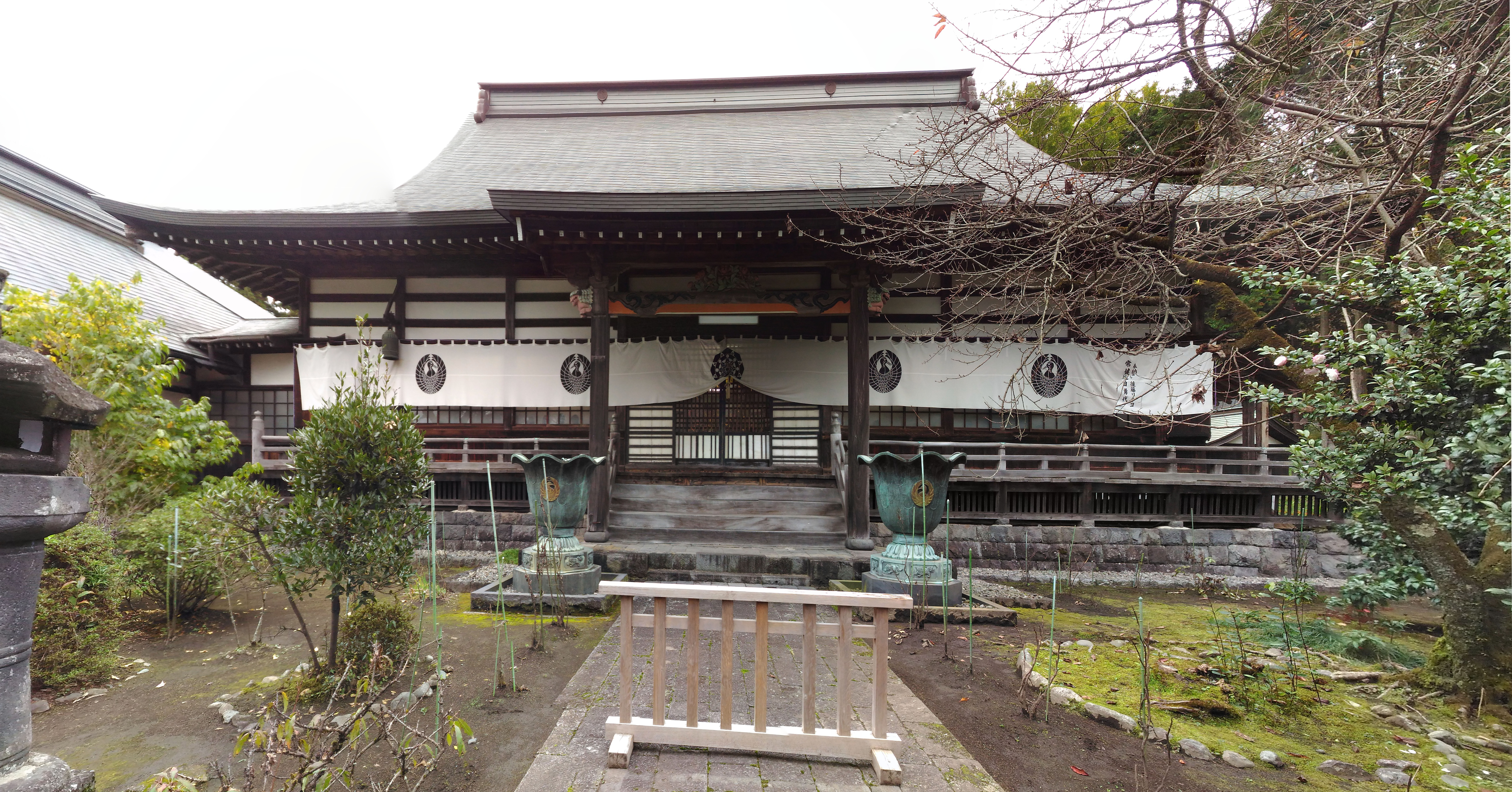
Myoren-ji Temple is named in honor of the wife of Nanjo Tokimitsu.

An approximate thirty-minute walk from the Head Temple is Myoren-ji, which is another former “Head Temple” of the various Fuji schools which conjoined with Taisekiji in the 25 December 1950 during the proselytizing efforts of former Soka Gakkai President Josei Toda. The temple was once a former residence of Nanjo Tokimitsu, the person who donated the land of Taisekiji to Nikko Shonin. The temple's name derives from the Buddhist name (kaimyō) Nanjo Tokimitsu's wife, Myōren, whose historical birth name is unknown. This temple houses many historically significant artifacts, in particular, the Gohonzon enshrined in its main altar, which was transcribed by Nikko Shonin in the year 1315, and a small, decorative statue of Nichiren that is preserved as a historical remembrance. The temple is known for the unique format of its Oeshiki ceremony commemorating the death of Nichiren. Since 25 December 1950, it has been under the sacerdotal administration of the Nichiren Shoshu sect.
