= Honzon =

Japanese Buddhist worship image

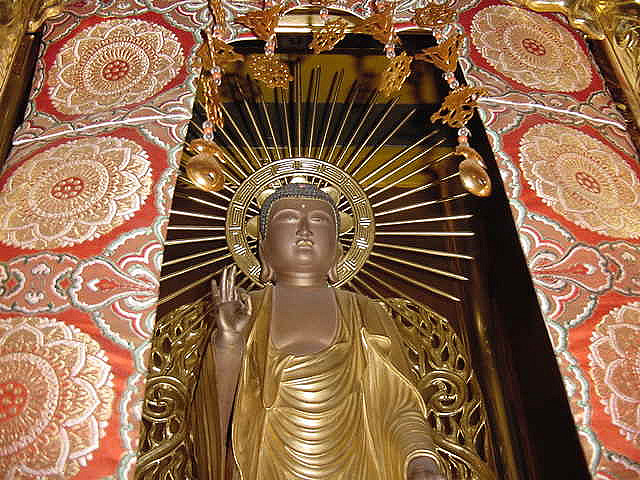
An example of Butsuzō Honzon in the Pure Land tradition featuring Amida Buddha.

Honzon (本尊; "fundamental honored [one]"), sometimes referred to as a Gohonzon (ご本尊 or 御本尊), is the enshrined main image or principal deity in Japanese Buddhism. The buddha, bodhisattva, or mandala image is located in either a temple or a household butsudan.

The image can be either a statue or a small scroll and varies from sect to sect. It can be a singular image or a group of images; the honzon in the main (hondō) or treasure (kondō) hall of the temple can be for that particular hall or the entire temple complex. Sometimes honzon is the central image (chūson) of a cluster of three (sanzonbutsu) or five (goson) images.

The physical creation of an icon is followed by a consecration ceremony (known as kaigen, literally 'opening the eyes' or 'dotting the eyes'). It is believed this transforms the honzon into a 'vessel' of the deity which in its own right has power.

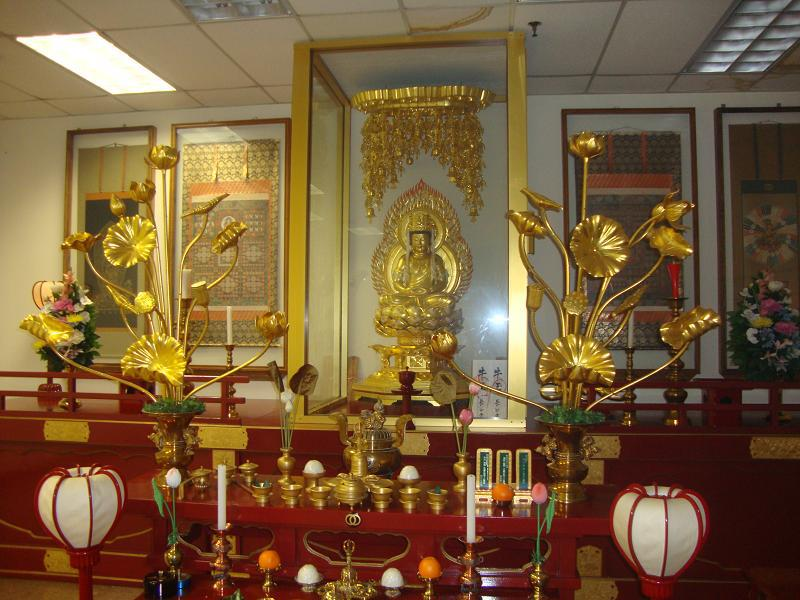
Shingon-shu Buzan-ha Mikkyo altar

== Butsuzō ==
A honzon that takes the form of a statue is called a Butsuzō (仏像) or Honzonbutsu (本尊仏), most likely crafted out of cypress wood or metal such as copper or bronze. The Butsuzō is more common than other types of images. Tori Busshi was an early and renowned creator of worship statues. The Butsuzōzui, originally published in 1690, is a compendium of reproductions of 800 Butsuzō.

== In various sects ==
Before the introduction of Buddhism to Japan in the sixth century there is no evidence of honzon in Shinto worship. Instead, its use was a cultural influence from Buddhism. Each sect of Japanese Buddhism has its own honzon which sometimes varies from temple to temple or even from hall to hall within a given temple. This is a practice that was criticized by Ekai Kawaguchi, a 20th-century Japanese religious reformer.

Some images (hibutsu, literally "secret buddhas") are considered too sacred for public presentation.

=== Shingon Buddhism ===
In Mikkyō practices such as in Shingon Buddhism, the term refers to the divinity honored in a rite. When Kūkai introduced Shingon Esoteric Buddhism and its Buddhist Pantheon to Japan in the 9th century, the statuary worship practices found in China were incorporated. Over the centuries this developed into the Japanese Buddhist pantheon.

The role of the tutelary figure is similar to that of the yidam in Tibetan Buddhism. Tutelary deities in Vajrayana Buddhism, including Mikkyō, Tangmi and Tibetan Buddhism, are crucial to many religious practices.

=== Pure Land Buddhism ===
In the Jōdo Shinshū school of Pure Land Buddhism, under the leadership of Honen and Shinran, the use of "honzon" became more prevalent. The honzon took the form of inscriptions of the nembutsu: Namu Amida Buddha, other phrases, images of the Buddha, statuary, and even representations of the founder. Rennyo thought a honzonin the form of the written nembutsu was more appropriate than that of statue.

=== Rissho Koseikai ===
In the Rissho Kosei Kai members receive and practice to a honzon enshrined in their homes they label a "Daigohonzon". The scroll consists of an image of Shakyamuni. At the Rissho Kosei-kai headquarters there is a Gohonzon that is a statue of Shakyamuni.

=== Zen Buddhism ===
According to Suzuki, the proper honzon for the Zen altar is Shakyamuni Buddha. He is often attended by other Bodhisattvas and arhats such as statues of Kannon (Avalokitesvara), Yakushi (Bhaishajyaguru), Jizō (Kshitigarbha), or Miroku (Maitreya). Sometimes there is a trio of Amida (representing the past), Shakyamuni (the present), and Miroku (the future). There are other choices and combinations often influenced by the guiding philosophy of a temple.

== See also ==
- Buddharupa
- Butsudan
- Cult image
- Murti
- Prana Pratishtha
- Thangka
