= Butsudan =

Shrine commonly found in temples and homes in Japanese Buddhist cultures

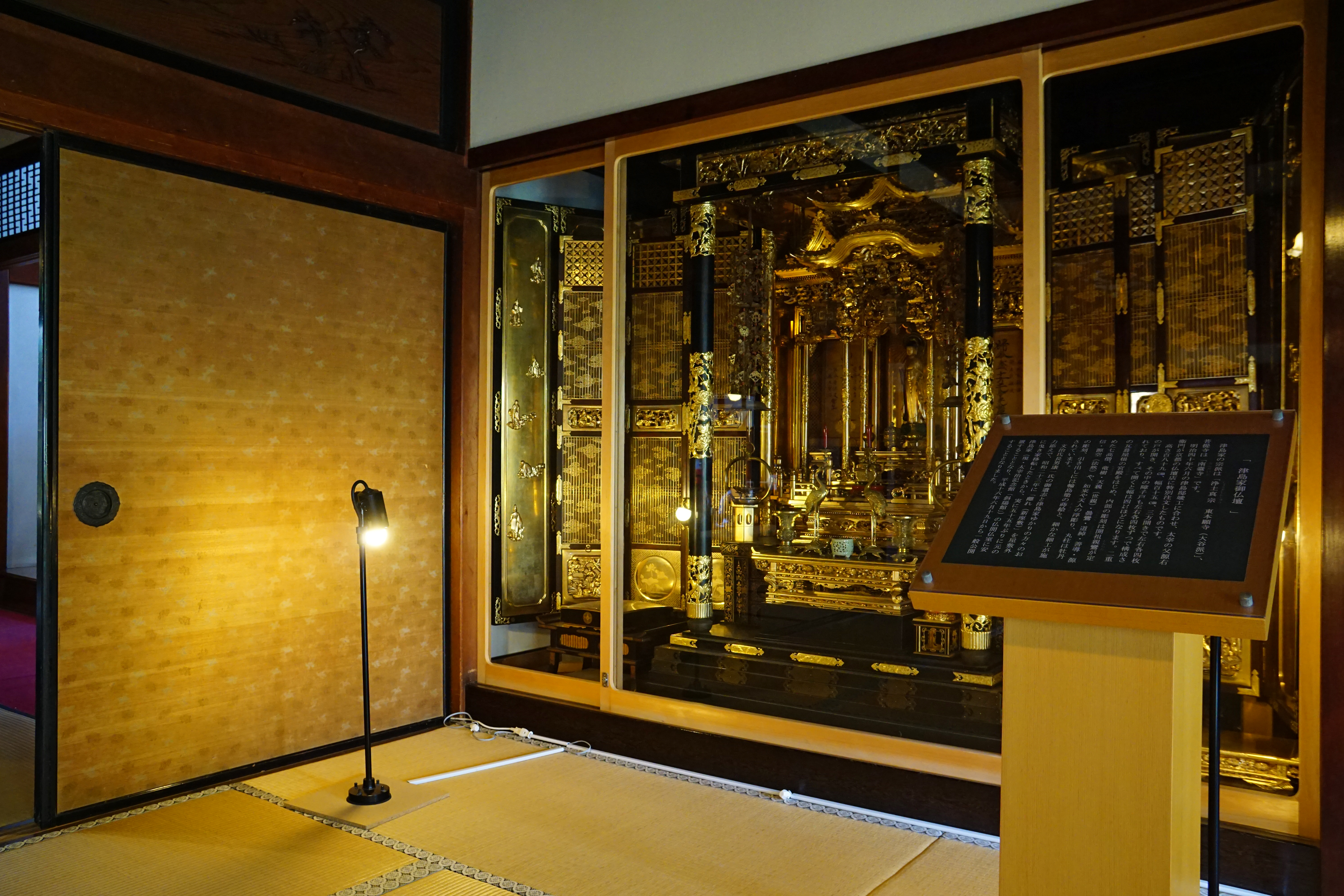
An ornate butsudan with open doors displaying an enshrined Amida Buddha. A Butsudan in the Jodo Shinshu Buddhism tradition. (At Osamu Dazai Memorial Museum)

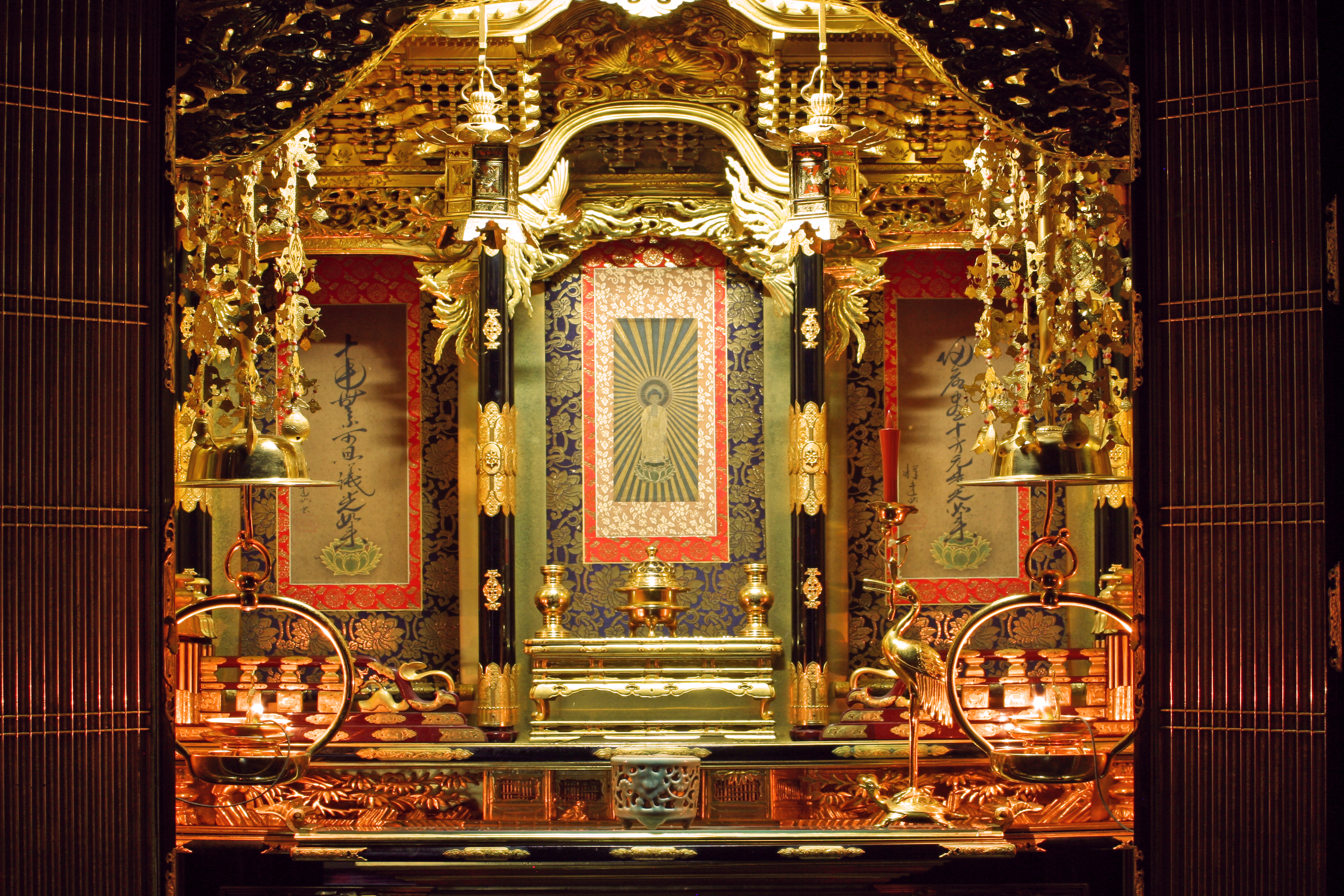
Close-up view of the inner altar with the painted scroll of the Buddha

A butsudan (仏壇; lit. "Buddhist altar") is a shrine or altar commonly found in Japanese Buddhist homes. A butsudan is either a defined, often ornate platform or simply a wooden cabinet sometimes crafted with doors that enclose and protect a gohonzon or religious icon, typically a statue or painting of a Buddha or bodhisattva, or a calligraphic mandala scroll.

The butsudan has multiple religious uses, including venerating the ancestors, paying respects to the recent dead, and venerating the Buddha.

== Arrangement ==
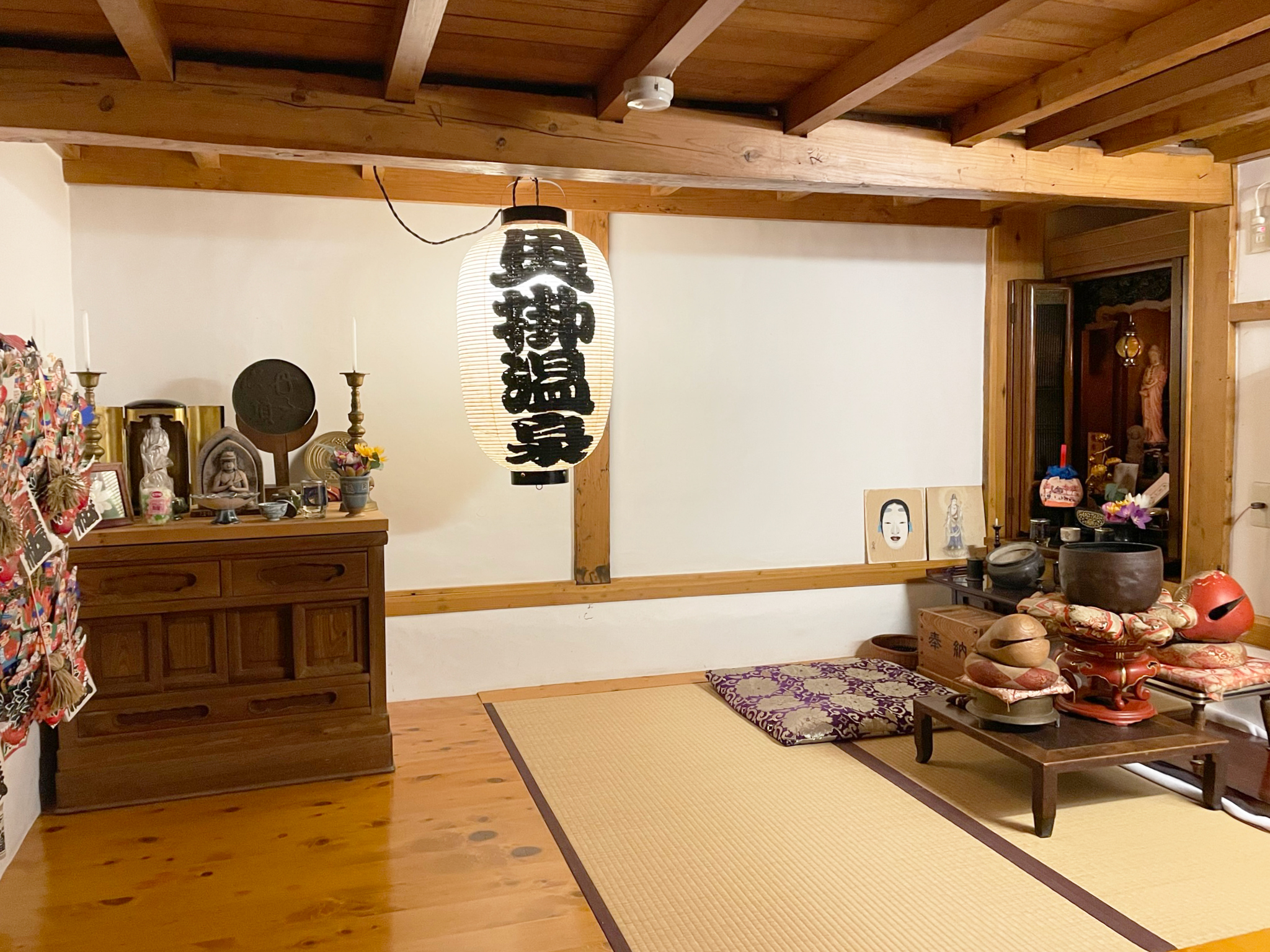
A Butsuma for customers of a Japanese style inn (Kaike Onsen, Yuzawa, Niigata)

A butsudan usually contains an array of subsidiary religious accessories, called butsugu, such as candlesticks, incense burners, bells, and platforms for placing offerings such as fruit, tea or rice. Most Buddhist schools, excluding Jōdo Shinshū, place ihai memorial tablets, kakochō death registers for deceased relatives, or urns containing the cremated remains of relatives, either within or near the butsudan. Traditional Japanese beliefs hold the Butsudan to be a house of the Buddha, Bodhisattva, as well as of deceased relatives enshrined within it. In some Buddhist schools, when a Butsudan is replaced or repaired by the family, a re-enshrinement ceremony follows.

The arrangement and types of items in and around the butsudan can vary depending on the school. A butsudan usually houses a honzon, a statue or painting of the Buddha or a Buddhist deity that reflects the school which the family follows, though embroidered scrolls containing a mantric or sutric text are also common. Other auxiliary items often found near the butsudan include tea, water and food (usually fruits or rice), an incense burner, candles, flowers, hanging lamps and evergreens. A rin often accompanies the butsudan, which can be rung during liturgy or recitation of prayers. Members of some Buddhist sects place ihai or tablets engraved with the names of deceased family members within or next to the butsudan. Other Buddhist sects, such as Jōdo Shinshū, usually do not have these, but may instead have pictures of the deceased placed near the butsudan. The butsudan is typically placed upon a larger cabinet in which are kept important family documents and certificates.

== Social-spiritual relations ==
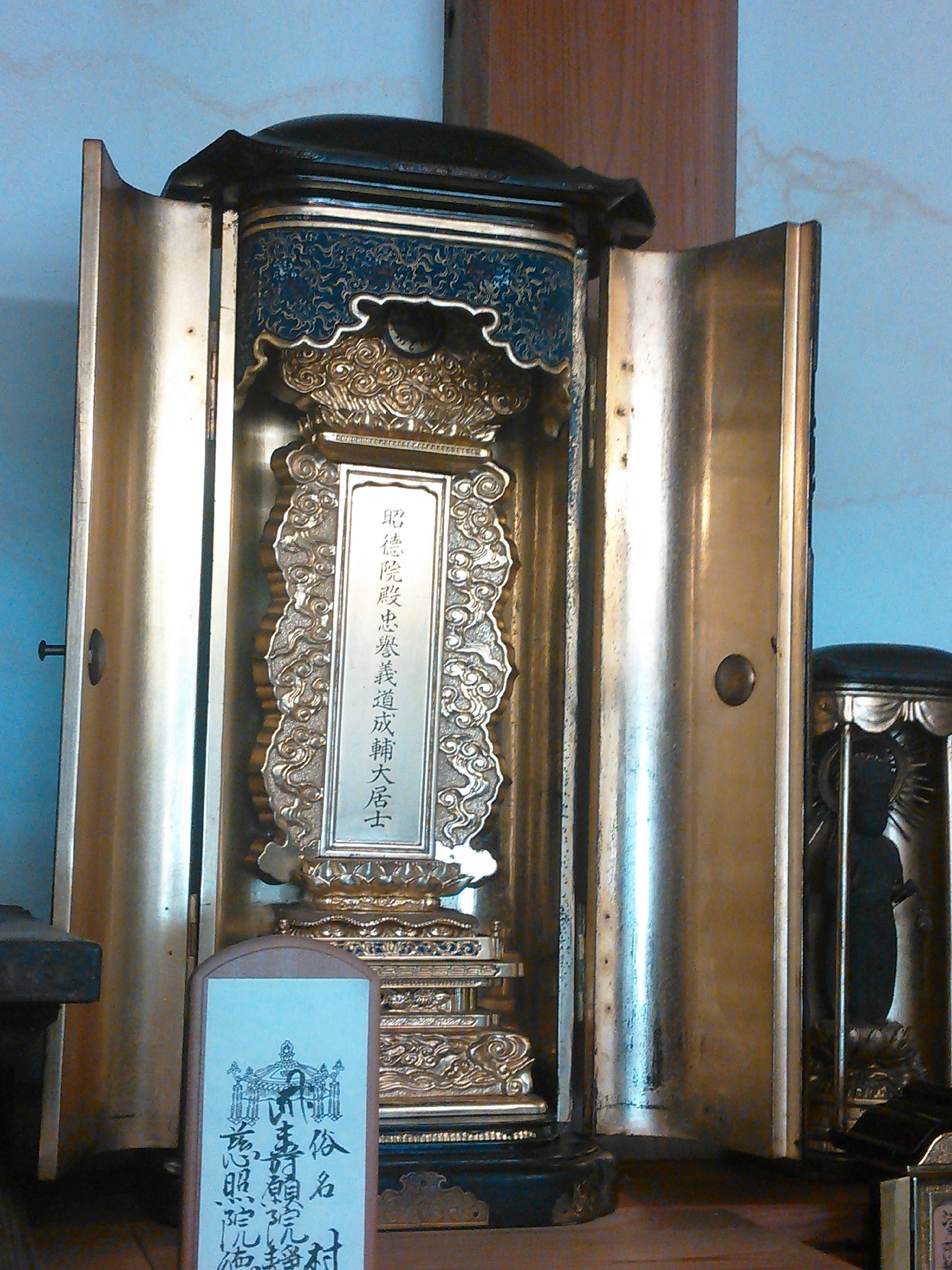
A spirit tablet in a butsudan

The butsudan is commonly seen as an essential part in the life of a traditional Japanese family as it is the centre of spiritual faith within the household, especially in dealing with the deaths of family members or reflecting on the lives of ancestors. This is especially true in many rural villages, where it is common for more than 90% of households to possess a butsudan, to be contrasted with urban and suburban areas, where the rate of butsudan ownership can often fall below 60%.

== See also ==
- Gohonzon (Nichiren Buddhism)
- Kamidana – analogous concept in Shinto
- Spirit house
