= Hokkekō =

Hokkekō Rengo Kai Federation
- Hokke—kō—Shu 法 華 講 衆
- The rounded crane symbol of Nichiren Shōshū Hokkekō
- Formation: 1279 (historical); 1962 (registration under the Japanese law)
- Type: Lay Organization
- Legal status: Active
- Headquarters: Hodo-in Temple; Ikebukuro, Tōkyō, Japan
- Members: 628,000 (2017)
- High Priest Dai-Koto Overseas Chief: Nichinyō Shōnin Koishiro Hoshino Most Rev. Nichijitsu Urushibata
- Website: Grand Hodo-in Temple Website

Hokkekō (法 華 講, Hokke kō) is the mainstream lay organization affiliated with the Nichiren Shōshū. It traces its origins to three martyr disciples who were arrowed and later beheaded in the Atsuhara persecutions and a more recent tradition of family lineages between 1726 and 1829 who have historically protected the Dai-Gohonzon over the centuries.

The word Hokke is a reference to the Lotus Sūtra (妙 法 蓮 華 經 Myōhō-Renge-Kyō or 法 華 經 Hokekyō), the Buddhist scripture Nichiren Shōshū bases its teachings on, and kō (講) in this usage means "lay group" or "congregation". Based on the word Hokke Shu inscribed on the Dai Gohonzon, another translation is "Lotus believers". As part of its official doctrine, the same sect teaches that Nichiren designated this term for his own followers during his lifetime.

The Hokkekō lay memberships are headed by local leaders called Koto, and are not affiliated with any political organization. Hokkekō members meet in residential homes and hold a local chapter meeting each year to plan their Tozan religious pilgrimages to the Taisekiji temple.

Prior to 27 December 1997, lay members of the Sōka Gakkai were considered by Nichiren Shōshū to be equal to Hokkekō members, entitled to participate in meetings and see the Dai-Gohonzon, allowing a 7-year span before officially ending their sectarian membership, which went into effect on 1 December 1997. The current Dai-Koto Chairperson for the Hokkekō Federation is Mr. Koichiro Hoshino.

== History ==
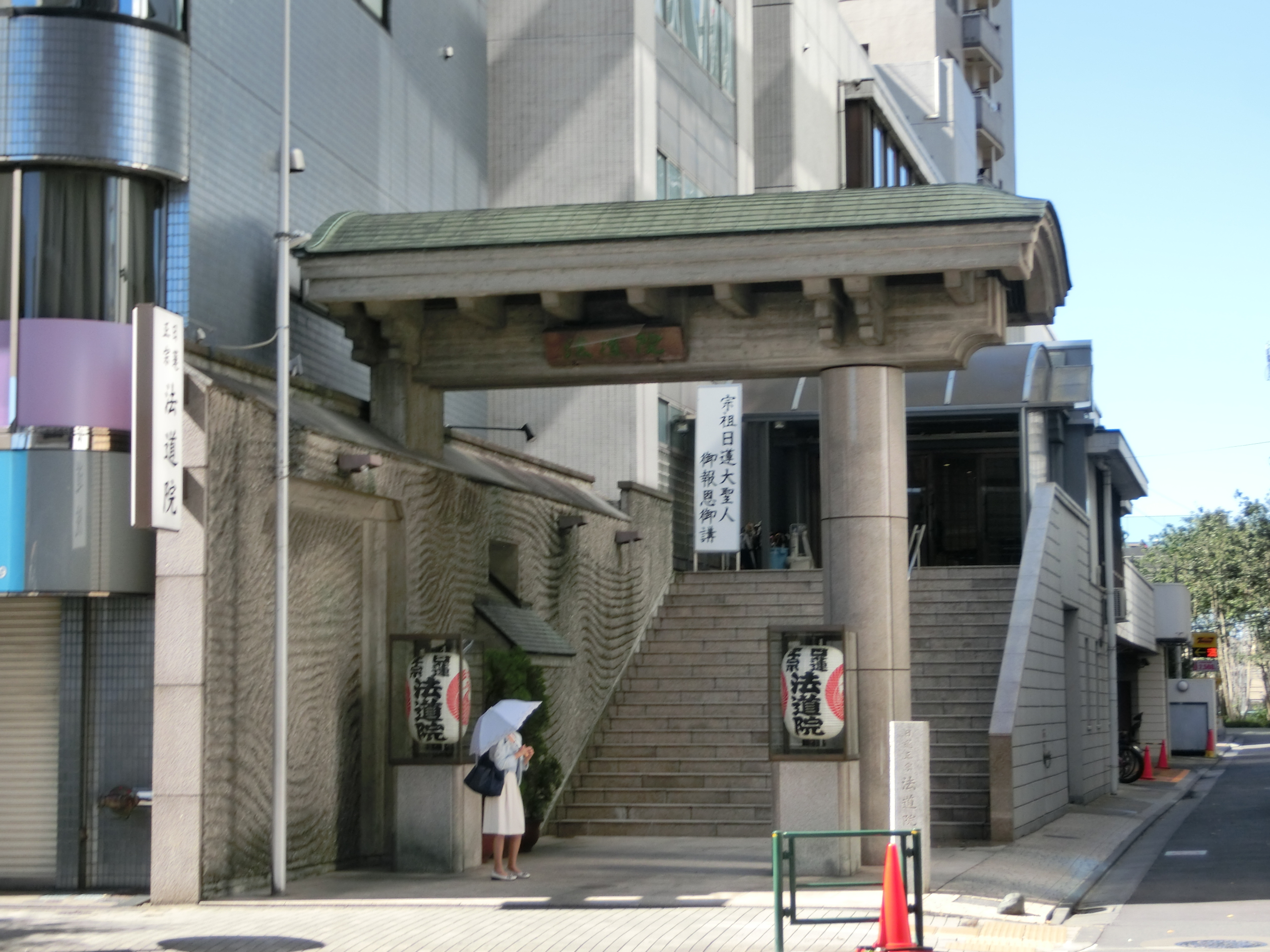
Founded by 56th High Priest Nichi-O Shōnin on 12 December 1898, the Grand Hodo-in Temple in Toshima Tōkyō serves as the headquarters of the Hokkekō organization of Nichiren Shōshū.

Before the current lay association established with Nichiren Shōshū members, the Hokkekō traces its origins to the Atsuhara persecutions, who were mostly lower-class peasants in Japanese feudal society. Seventeen believers were whipped and dragged to their death, while three farmers, Jin-shirou, Yagoro and Yarou-Kuro, were tied to a wooden post and killed by arrows after not renouncing the Lotus Sūtra in favour of the Pure Land teachings.

In later references, temple congregations known as Hokkekō or Hokkekōshū (法 華 講 衆) date back to at least the 13th century. Nichiren Daishōnin (1222–1282), the founder of Nichiren Shōshū, also referred collectively to his lay followers as Hokke—shū in the dedication written on the Dai-Gohonzon, the school's object of veneration, inscribed on 12 October 1279.

Nichiren Shōshū attributes the appellation Hokkekō to this usage by Nichiren Daishōnin. Hokkekō is the name given to Nichiren Daishōnin's believers who died at the Atsuhara persecution and its present living family descendants. They are affiliated with the head temple at Taiseki-ji in Japan.

== Organization ==
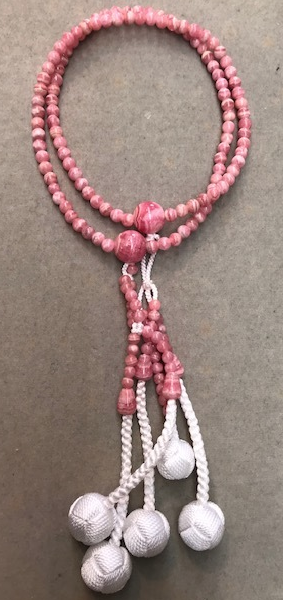
Buddhist Juzu prayer beads with white cords and balls, the only color and format permitted for use within Nichiren Shōshū practice.

In addition to being what congregations of Nichiren Shōshū temples (close to 700 in Japan and 20 in other countries) have traditionally called themselves, Hokkekō is also used loosely in reference to all temple congregations (local Hokkekō chapters) collectively. When used this way, it can be understood to mean the national Hokkekō umbrella organization in Japan and Hokkekō groups that encompass the congregations of Nichiren Shōshū temples outside Japan.

The Japanese umbrella organization, officially called the Hokkekō Rengō Kai (Hokkekō Federation), is related to Japanese Buddhism and was incorporated under Japanese law in July 1962. Its headquarters are located at Hodo-in temple Toshima Tōkyō, Japan, and it maintains a chapter at each local temple.

Hokkekō groups tend to be organized fairly loosely and are generally unregimented. Whereas some members are very active in temple-based propagation and other activities, others come only for a monthly service called o-kō (or, more formally, go-hō—on o-kō (御 報 恩 御 講), "meeting to show gratitude to the Buddha"), the annual Oeshiki ceremony on the anniversary of Nichiren Daishōnin's passing, and other temple events.

Hokkekō is not affiliated with any political organization. (The former Dai-Koto was Mr. Kisoji Yanagisawa.) The current Dai-Koto of the Hokkekō Federation is Mr. Koichiro Hoshino. The present vice-chairman is Mr. Hiroo Sekino.

== See also ==
- Nichiren Shōshū
- Nichiren Buddhism
