= Jimon Ogasawara =

Jimon Ogasawara (小笠原慈聞, ???-1955) was a priest of the Nichiren Shoshu school of Buddhism. He has been an apologist for the pre-war and wartime Japanese military government. His collusion with the government, scholars claim, came close to destroying his sect during the war.

== Roles within Nichiren Shoshu ==
Ogasawara had served important roles within his school. He was the chief editor of Nichiren Shoshu's doctrinal magazine “Seikaino Nichiren” (Nichiren of the World) and was also the supervisor of proselytization for Nichiren Shoshu. Ogasawara used these roles to promote his version of syncretism—the attempted merging of Nichiren Buddhism and Shinto. Distinct from Honji suijaku which declared Kami as the manifestations and teaching mechanisms of the Buddha, Ogasawara proposed the theory “Shinto is Absolute; and the Buddha, Transient,” which held that Shinto deities are primary and the Buddha is secondary. For this reason he was described by the Japanese religious newspaper Chugai Nippo as a “venomous priest.”

== Support of the military government ==
Ogasawara was active in directly colluding with the military government. He was a member of the Suigyo-kai (Fish and Water Society), a group of army, business and religious figures who attempted to promote national mobilization by unifying all Nichiren schools into one sect, regardless of their unique histories and doctrines. On March 10, 1941, at a joint conference of Nichiren Shoshu priests and laymen, Ogasawara called for the immediate approval of the merger with other Nichiren sects but his resolution failed to carry. A few months later he then pressured the executive leaders of Nichiren Shoshu to resign under the guise of sect reform and encouraged governmental authorities to indict Nichiren Shoshu's then High Priest and Chief Administrator Nikkyo Suzuki and his administration for Lèse-majesté, the crime of dishonoring the emperor. He also instigated the imprisonment of Tsunesaburo Makiguchi and Josei Toda, the respective president and general director of what now is known as the Soka Gakkai.

== After 1945 ==
Ogasawara was surreptitiously reinstituted as a Nichiren Shoshu priest soon after the war in 1946 without having publicly denouncing his wartime theories; some allegations exist that he continued to expound them after the war. His reappointment was hidden from the Soka Gakkai leadership and public announcement of his reinstatement and appointment to a high priestly ranking of dai-sozu was not made until April 30, 1952. This gap in communication led to the “Ogasawara Incident” of April 27, 1952, in which his presence at Taisekiji was uncovered by Soka Gakkai youth who severely reprimanded him and his theories. The aftershocks from this incident lasted for six months. On September 9, 1952, he was rebuked by the Nichiren Shoshu leadership and threatened with expulsion unless he fully and openly denounced his wartime theories. He also faced the loss of support from his own local temple's parishioners. He capitulated to this demand on October 31, 1952.

In the final years before his death, he reconciled with and supported Josei Toda and the Soka Gakkai. In 1954, when the Soka Gakkai had a dispute with a priest of Renge-ji temple in Osaka, Ogasawara voiced strong support for the former. On May 25, 1955 Ogasawara wrote the book “Introduction to Nichiren Shoshu” (Nichiren Shoshu Nyumon) in which he acknowledged his mistaken doctrine of “Shinto is absolute; the Buddha, transient” and highly praised Josei Toda.
