= Zadankai =

Soka Gakkai community-based conventicles

Zadankai (座談会, discussion meetings) are community-based conventicles which serve as the grassroots activity of Soka Gakkai members. They are the means for propagation and deepening faith. Soka Gakkai literature also describes them as being sites for neighborhood revitalization.

The tradition of zadankai was started by the Soka Gakkai's founder Tsunesaburō Makiguchi in the late 1930s. The format of the meetings Makiguchi led centered on participants sharing personal stories about how their practice of Nichiren Buddhism improved their daily lives.

The tradition of holding zadankai was continued by the second Soka Gakkai president Jōsei Toda after World War II. Under Daisaku Ikeda's presidency, they are the central activity of the Soka Gakkai.

Ikeda organized discussion meetings for Japanese emigres during his first overseas trip to the United States and Brazil in 1960. The first zadankai conducted in English was held in the United States in 1963.

== Format ==
Zadankai are held at neighborhood "district" or "group" levels, and attendance has been estimated at between 20% and 80% of the total membership. Actual attendance is usually between 10 and 20 people, including families with small children.

Meeting agendas are planned, but with autonomy and room for improvisation. Typically, a discussion meeting consists of sutra recitation and chanting daimoku, sharing of experiences and encouragement, study and guidance, and efforts at encouraging new attendees to start their Buddhist practice. There is a meeting leader whose job it is to encourage discussion.

== Religious significance of discussion meetings ==
Discussion meetings have been likened to the "formal liturgy" of the Soka Gakkai. At discussion meetings, participants are encouraged to take responsibility "for their own lives and for wider social and global concerns." The format is an example of how the Soka Gakkai is able to "dispense with much of the apparatus of conventional church organization". Zadankai differ from other religious traditions also by allowing participants to address the challenges to happiness encountered in daily life situations. The discussion meeting is among the most important activities of the Soka Gakkai as well as the basis of propagation, and have been called "a new paradigm" for religious worship in general

== Evaluations ==
The impressions of scholars who have observed Soka Gakkai discussion meetings vary. Seagar at first found them akin to a "consciousness raising" group and Metraux likened them to group therapy – albeit in a "wonderful" form, with a congenial, "family" atmosphere. White states that they encourage free intercourse and self-expression, and Ramseyer found the participants open and trustful. Carter points out that the primary congregational emphasis rests not on any temple, church, monastery, mosque or synagogue but on small group gatherings in the homes of practitioners, particularly because it is a lay-based movement. Gathering in formal temples or churches confers a special power on the clerical authority residing in those sanctuaries. Gathering in people's homes seems by contrast inherently populist and democratic. It is a deceptively simple expression of the inherent egalitarianism of the SGI.
