= Human Revolution =

Human Revolution may refer to:

- Deus Ex: Human Revolution, a 2011 video game in the Deus Ex series
- The Human Revolution, a multi-volume novel by Daisaku Ikeda, and adaptations
- Any of four stages in human evolution:
  - Human evolution, the emergence of Homo sapiens as a physically distinct species
  - Upper Paleolithic Revolution, the emergence of modern behavioral traits in Homo sapiens
  - Neolithic Revolution, the wide-scale transition from hunting and gathering to agriculture
  - Origins of society, the emergence of distinctively human social organizations
