= Minoru Harada =

Japanese Buddhist leader

6th President of Soka Gakkai
- Incumbent
- Assumed office 9 November 2006
- Preceded by: Einosuke Akiya

Personal details
- Born: November 8, 1941 (age 84) Bunkyo-Ku, Tokyo, Japan
- Education: University of Tokyo

Minoru Harada (原田 稔, Harada Minoru; born 8 November 1941) is a Japanese Buddhist leader. He is the sixth president of the Soka Gakkai from 9 November 2006. He is also the Supreme Advisor of Sōka University and the Acting President of Soka Gakkai International (SGI).

In 1953, he became an adherent of Soka Gakkai (at the time was one of the several lay organizations of Nichiren Shoshu Buddhism). He attended Tokyo Metropolitan Bunkyo High School (now Tokyo Metropolitan Bunkyo Secondary Education School). He graduated from the University of Tokyo with a Bachelor of Economics degree.

According to Soka Gakkai, he was a left-wing protester and a student activist, participating in the demonstration into the National Diet Building in the 1960s. He was the manager of the Student Division and the Youth Division of Soka Gakkai, and one of the Vice-Presidents of Soka Gakkai. In a 1976 interview, Harada provided views of Soka Gakkai which contrasted with traditional Nichiren ones; although the latter has typically seen natural disasters as arising when society refuses to adopt the "True Law", Soka Gakkai viewed such effects as being subtler, as in societal problems rather than the likes of earthquakes.

He became the sixth President of Soka Gakkai on 9 November 2006 following the resignation of Einosuke Akiya.

On 8 November 2014, Harada officially declared in the Seikyo Shimbun newspaper that the original tenets of the Soka Gakkai Constitution from 1930 have been revised and the Dai Gohonzon image that was once venerated within the organization is no longer its object of worship, further disassociating Soka Gakkai from the Nichiren Shoshu Buddhist sect.

== Soka Gakkai Presidency ==
Buddhist titles
Preceded by Einosuke Akiya	6th President of Soka Gakkai; 9 November 2006 - present	Succeeded by Incumbent
