= Einosuke Akiya =

Japanese Buddhist leader

5th President of Soka Gakkai
- In office 18 July 1981 – 9 November 2006
- Preceded by: Hiroshi Hōjō (北条浩)
- Succeeded by: Minoru Harada

Personal details
- Born: July 15, 1930 (age 96) Tokyo, Bunkyō, Bunkyo-Ku
- Education: Waseda University

Einosuke Akiya (秋谷 栄之助, Akiya Einosuke; born July 15, 1930) is a Japanese Buddhist leader. He was the fifth president of Soka Gakkai from 18 July 1981 to 9 November 2006. After his resignation from that position, he became the chairman of the Supreme Leader Meeting of Soka Gakkai in November 2006. He also had responsibilities in many Soka Gakkai's satellites (supreme advisor of Sōka University, honorary director of Tokyo Fuji Art Museum, and president of Soka Gakkai International (SGI).

== Personal life ==
Akiya was born in Tokyo. He attended Tokyo Metropolitan Bunkyo High School. After graduating from Waseda University with a B.A. degree in French Literature, he went to work at the Seikyo Shimbun company, Soka Gakkai's newspaper. His brother-in-law, Kōshirō Ishida, is a former member of the House of Representatives in the National Diet and the former president of the New Komeito Party. His older brother, Tsuguo Ishida, is a former member of the House of Councillors in the National Diet.
