= Death of Akiyo Asaki =

Tokyo councilwoman

Akiyo Asaki
- 朝木明代
- Born: 1944
- Died: 1995 (aged 50–51)
- Occupation: Tokyo councilwoman

Akiyo Asaki (朝木明代, Asaki Akiyo; 1944–1995) was a Tokyo councilwoman whose death following allegations of petty theft - which has been ruled suicide by the Tokyo police - has been linked to "mysterious" circumstances surrounding Soka Gakkai involvement. Asaki was notable in Tokyo for making comments critical of Soka Gakkai.

== Scandal and death ==
As a councilwoman, Asaki repeatedly questioned why city garbage collection contracts went exclusively to Soka Gakkai-affiliated companies. She received death threats after raising the issue.

In July 1995, she was accused of stealing a T-shirt from a clothing store. Asaki was never actually convicted of shoplifting. Several newsweeklies reported that the clothing store proprietor was a member of Soka Gakkai who could have invented the shoplifting charge.

On September 1, 1995, Asaki fell to her death from a sixth-story apartment building next to Higashi-Murayama Station. Police ruled the death a suicide. She was 51.

On September 23, 1995, Asaki's widower and surviving daughter, as well as her coworker in the Tokyo city council, all made statements to the press to the effect that they believed Soka Gakkai was involved in Asaki's death. Their statements were reported by Time and several Japanese newsweeklies. Soka Gakkai's president compared the bereaved family to Aum Shinrikyo, a religious cult famous for dropping poison gas into the Tokyo subway system in March 1995.

In 2008 and 2009, Asaki's coworker Hozumi Yano won two defamation suits brought by Soka Gakkai for expressing his opinion that she was murdered.
