= Soka Gakkai =

Japanese Buddhist religious movement

Sōka Gakkai
- 創価学会
- Soka Gakkai flag
- Type: New religious movement (Japan)
- President: Minoru Harada
- Associations: Soka Gakkai International
- Headquarters: 〒160-8583, Tokyo Shinjuku-Ku, Shinanomachi (信濃町)
- Founder: Tsunesaburō Makiguchi; Jōsei Toda; Daisaku Ikeda
- Origin: November 18, 1930
- Separated from: Nichiren Shōshū (1991)
- Members: 8.27 million according to SG (2025); between 3.78 and 5 million according to academics in 2018
- Other name: Sōka Kyōiku Gakkai (創価教育学会)
- Official website: www.sokagakkai.jp (Japanese) www.sokaglobal.org (international)

Soka Gakkai (Japanese: 創価学会, Hepburn: Sōka Gakkai; "creating value study group") is a Japanese new religion founded in 1930 based on the teachings of the 13th-century Japanese Buddhist priest Nichiren. The Sōka Gakkai has been led by Minoru Harada since December 2023. The organization bases its teachings on Nichiren's interpretation of the Lotus Sutra and places chanting Nam Myōhō Renge Kyō at the center of devotional practice. The Soka Gakkai is a community-based Buddhist organization that promotes peace, culture, and education based on the respect for dignity of life.

The Soka Gakkai was founded by educators Makiguchi and Toda on 18 November 1930 as Soka Kyoiku Gakkai (Society for Value-Creating Education). It was later named the Soka Gakkai. It held its inaugural meeting in 1937. It was disbanded during the Second World War when much of the leadership was imprisoned for violations of the 1925 Peace Preservation Law and charges of lèse-majesté. In 1945, Toda began rebuilding the Soka Gakkai after his release from prison. Daisaku Ikeda was the third president of the Soka Gakkai and the founding president of the Soka Gakkai International. In Japan, Komeito is a political party that was founded in 1964 by Daisaku Ikeda to represent diverse public interests and fight corruption, as an alternative to political parties backed by labor unions and big corporations.

From an academic perspective, Levi McLaughlin argued in his 2018 book that, in Japan, the Soka Gakkai functions as a "mimetic nation-state," reproducing the institutions and narratives of modern Japan.

As of 2025, the Soka Gakkai says it has 8.25 million member households in Japan. American academic Levi McLaughlin estimated in 2018 that membership is under 4 million.

In 2010, Soka Gakkai was noted as having a turbulent history in Japan. Komeito, a political party closely aligned with Soka Gakkai and founded by elements of its lay membership, entered a coalition agreement with the Liberal Democratic Party in 1999 and was formerly a junior partner in government until the coalition's dissolution in 2025.

Soka Gakkai has been described as a cult.

== Beliefs ==
The beliefs of Soka Gakkai center on recognizing that all life has dignity with infinite inherent potential; this immanent Buddhahood exists in every person and can be awakened through the Buddhist practice prescribed by Nichiren. Further, a person's social actions at every moment can lead to soka, or the creation of value (the theory of the interdependence of life). Societal change is facilitated through "human revolution", a way of living in the world that creates value.

The doctrine of Soka Gakkai derives from Nichiren, who promulgated the Lotus Sutra as he perceived its application to the epoch in which he and people today live. Soka Gakkai gives significance to Nichiren's writings, referred to as gosho, (Note: Go is an honorific prefix and sho means 'writings'; thus, literally, 'honorable writings'.) and refers especially to the collection of Nichiren's writings that Nichiko Hori compiled and Jōsei Toda, published as Nichiren Daishonin Gosho Zenshu in 1952.

=== Ichinen sanzen ===
T'ien-t'ai (538–597), a Chinese Buddhist scholar who upheld the Lotus Sutra, developed a theoretical system to describe the infinite interconnectedness of life translated as "the principle of the mutually inclusive relationship of a single moment of life and all phenomena" or "three thousand realms in a single moment of life" (Japanese: ichinen sanzen). This theory demonstrates that the phenomenal world exists in a single moment. Soka Gakkai members believe that because Nichiren made actualizing this possible by inscribing Gohonzon and teaching the invocation, their prayers and actions can, in a single moment, pierce through limitations.

=== "Life force" and "Human Revolution" ===
Soka Gakkai teaches that this "self-induced change in each individual" – which Josei Toda began referring to as "human revolution" – is what leads to happiness and peace.

Josei Toda studied a passage from the Immeasurable Meanings Sutra (considered the introduction to the Lotus Sutra) that describes Buddhahood by means of 34 negations – for example, that it is "neither being nor non-being, this nor that, square nor round". From this, he concluded that "Buddha" is life or life force.

Toda considered the concept of "Buddha as life (force)" means that Buddhism entails transforming society. Ikeda has been quoted as saying, "Faith is firm belief in the universe and the life force. Only a person of firm faith can lead a good and vigorous life [...] Buddhist doctrine is a philosophy that has human life as its ultimate object, and our Human Revolution movement is an act of reform aimed at opening up the inner universe, the creative life force within each individual, and leading to human freedom."

The concept of life force is central to the Soka Gakkai's conception of the role of religion and the application of Nichiren's teachings. Ikeda states that "[o]ur health, courage, wisdom, joy, desire to improve, self-discipline, and so on, could all be said to depend on our life force".

=== Oneness of mentor and disciple ===
The Soka Gakkai liturgy refers to all of its first three presidents – Tsunesabura Makiguchi, Josei Toda, and Daisaku Ikeda – as "the eternal mentors of kosen-rufu". The organization's former leader, Ikeda, is revered by members. The relationship between members and their mentors is referred to as "the oneness of mentor and disciple". The mentor is to lead and thereby improve the lives of his disciples. The mentor's actions are seen as giving disciples confidence in their own unrealized potential. The role of disciples is seen as supporting their mentor and realizing his vision using their unique abilities and circumstances.

Since the mid-1990s, the issue of the oneness of mentor and disciple has received more prominence in Soka Gakkai. There is a strong emphasis on "cultivating all members [...] in discipleship" through forging "affective one-to-one relationships with Ikeda".

=== "On Establishing the Correct Teaching for the Peace of the Land" ===
Nichiren wrote a treatise, "On Establishing the Correct Teaching for the Peace of the Land," in 1260 and submitted it to the regent. Soka Gakkai members believe it is one of his most important writings. In it, he claimed that the source of the natural disasters Japan faced at that time was due to the weakened spirit of its people, caused by attachments to religions that disavow the primacy of the people themselves. He called for the leaders and people to base their spiritual life on the Lotus Sutra, "the correct teaching", which would, in turn, lead to "the peace of the land".

=== Five "Eternal Guidelines of Faith" ===
In 1957, Josei Toda proclaimed three "Eternal Guidelines of Faith". In 2003, Daisaku Ikeda added two more guidelines. The Five Guidelines of Faith are:

1. Faith for a harmonious family;
2. Faith for each person to become happy;
3. Faith for surmounting obstacles;
4. Faith for health and long life;
5. Faith for absolute victory.

=== Relation to the Lotus Sutra ===
Soka Gakkai members pray to Nichiren's Gohonzon (see section on Gohonzon), which "embodies Nam-myoho-renge-kyo, the essence of the Lotus Sutra". The Gohonzon includes the Sutra's teaching that all life inherently possesses dignity when "illuminated by the light of the Mystic Law", and depicts the ceremony in which bodhissatvas embrace "their mission to teach and preach to suffering people the path to happiness and freedom".

Soka Gakkai's history is closely intertwined with the study of the Lotus Sutra. Josei Toda began the postwar reconstruction by lecturing on the sutra, the study of which led to what Soka Gakkai considers his enlightenment (see "Life Force and Human Revolution"). After Soka Gakkai's ex-communication by Nichiren Shōshū, Daisaku Ikeda conducted dialogue sessions on the Lotus Sutra, which resulted in the publication of a six-volume work called The Wisdom of the Lotus Sutra.

=== Karma (as "changing karma into mission") ===
The concept of karma is based on the law of causality. It refers to consequences created through actions, words, or thoughts. Both early Buddhists and Hindus believed that to redress karma accumulated throughout many eons, one must be reincarnated numerous times. The concept of karma then often became a source of despair as well as a tool for Buddhist clergy to instill fear and guilt in the minds of believers. Soka Gakkai Nichiren Buddhism, however, believes that the fundamental cause for revealing the ultimate potential of life, or Buddha nature, can diminish the influence of negative karma in the present lifetime.

Ikeda explains that negative karma is subsumed in the world of Buddhahood and is purified by its power. Importantly, Soka Gakkai members believe effects are determined simultaneously with causes, though they remain latent until the right external influences bring them to fruition. Soka Gakkai Buddhism teaches that even the most stubborn karma can be overcome as one reveals one's Buddha nature in this lifetime.

== Practices ==
The practice of Soka Gakkai members is directed to "oneself and others".

=== Chanting ===
The words Nam-myoho-renge-kyo (also called Daimoku) is the main practice of the organization, which is claimed to express the true nature of life through cause and effect. Soka Gakkai members believe that chanting releases the power of the universal life force inherent in life. For some members, chanting for material benefits is a first step toward realizing the ultimate goal of Buddhahood.

The believers of the organization chant these words reputed to change their lives, including the natural environments in which they live. Accordingly, the intended goal is to produce an internal change that serves as the motivator for external social change. Furthermore, the organization teaches that chanting cannot be divorced from action.

=== Gohonzon ===
The Gohonzon Soka Gakkai members enshrine in their homes and centers is a transcription by the 26th High Priest Nichikan Shonin. The central main syllabary of characters reads Namu-Myoho-Renge-Kyo (南 無 妙 法 蓮 華 經). The lower portion reads Nichi-Ren (日 蓮). On the corners are the names of the Four Heavenly Kings from Buddhist cosmology, and the remaining characters are names of Buddhist deities reputed to represent the various conditions of life.

The organization teaches that in contrast to worshipping the Buddha or Dharma as anthropomorphized personifications, Nichiren deliberately made a calligraphic mandala, rather than Buddhist statues as the central object of devotion. American author, Richard Seager explains the following:

"...In total, it is not a sacred image in the traditional sense but an abstract representation of a universal essence or principle. Nichiren wrote: "I, Nichiren, have inscribed my life in sumi ink, so believe in the Gohonzon with your whole heart." He further stated: "Never seek this Gohonzon outside yourself. The Gohonzon exists only within the mortal flesh of us ordinary people who chant Nam-myoho-renge-kyo."

The Soka Gakkai often uses Nichiren's metaphor of a mirror to explain its faith in the Gohonzon. The Gohonzon "reflects life's innate enlightened nature and cause it to permeate every aspect of member's lives". Members chant to the Gohonzon "to reveal the power of their own enlightened wisdom and vow to put it to use for the good of themselves and others". The organization teaches that a member is considered to be practicing the Lotus Sutra when chanting Nam-Myoho-Renge-Kyo to the Gohonzon.

=== Faith, practice, and study ===
The primary practice of the Soka Gakkai, like that of most Nichiren sects, is chanting Nam-myoho-renge-kyo, which is the title of the Lotus Sutra, and simultaneously considered the Buddha nature inherent in life and the ultimate reality of existence. The supplemental practice is the daily recitation of parts of the 2nd and 16th chapters of the Lotus Sutra. Unlike other Nichiren sects, the Soka Gakkai stresses that practice for enlightenment entails actual "engagement in the realities of daily life", while including the happiness of others in one's own practice.

Believers claim that the Lotus Sutra contains principles or teachings that are not readily apparent. Furthermore, the Soka Gakkai claims that Nichiren revealed these teachings as The "Three Great Secret Laws" namely the following:.

1. The "Object of Devotion" (Gohonzon mandala) used and designated by the Soka Gakkai
2. The incantation (of Nam-myoho-renge-kyo) by united Soka Gakkai believers
3. The sanctuary or place where Buddhism is practiced.

Soka Gakkai practices Nichiren Buddhism as it has been expounded by its three founding presidents, and so also studies their speeches and writings, especially those of third President Daisaku Ikeda. His novelized histories of the movement, The Human Revolution (and its sequel The New Human Revolution) have been said to have "canonical status" as it "functions as a source of inspiration and guidance for members". Study meetings are held monthly. "The tenor of the meetings is one of open discussion rather than didactic teaching..." Discussions on Nichiren's teachings are welcomed, "dictatorial edicts on moral behavior are not."

The Soka Gakkai practice also includes activities beyond the ritualistic, such as meetings, social engagement, and improving one's circumstances; these also have significance as religious activities in the Soka Gakkai.

=== Discussion meetings ===
Gakkai meetings have been called "formal liturgies" in that their format – "chanting, relatos (experiences), teachings, inspiring entertainment" – is identical from place to place. Discussion meetings are among the most important activities of the Soka Gakkai.

At discussion meetings, participants are encouraged to take responsibility "for their own lives and for wider social and global concerns". The format is an example of how the Soka Gakkai is able to "dispense with much of the apparatus of conventional church organization".

=== Proselytizing ===
The Soka Gakkai's expansion methods have been seen as controversial, as it employed a Buddhist method called shakubuku, a term employed by Nichiren, translated as "break and subdue (attachments to inferior teachings)."

The reason for propagation, as explained by Josei Toda, is "not to make the Soka Gakkai larger but for you to become happier ... There are many people in the world who are suffering from poverty and disease. The only way to make them really happy is to shakubuku them."

In 1970 Ikeda prescribed a more moderate approach, "urging its members to adopt an attitude of openness to others"; the method Soka Gakkai prefers since then is called shoju– "dialogue or conversation designed to persuade people rather than convert them", though this is often referred to still as "shakubuku spirit".

== History ==
=== Foundation ===
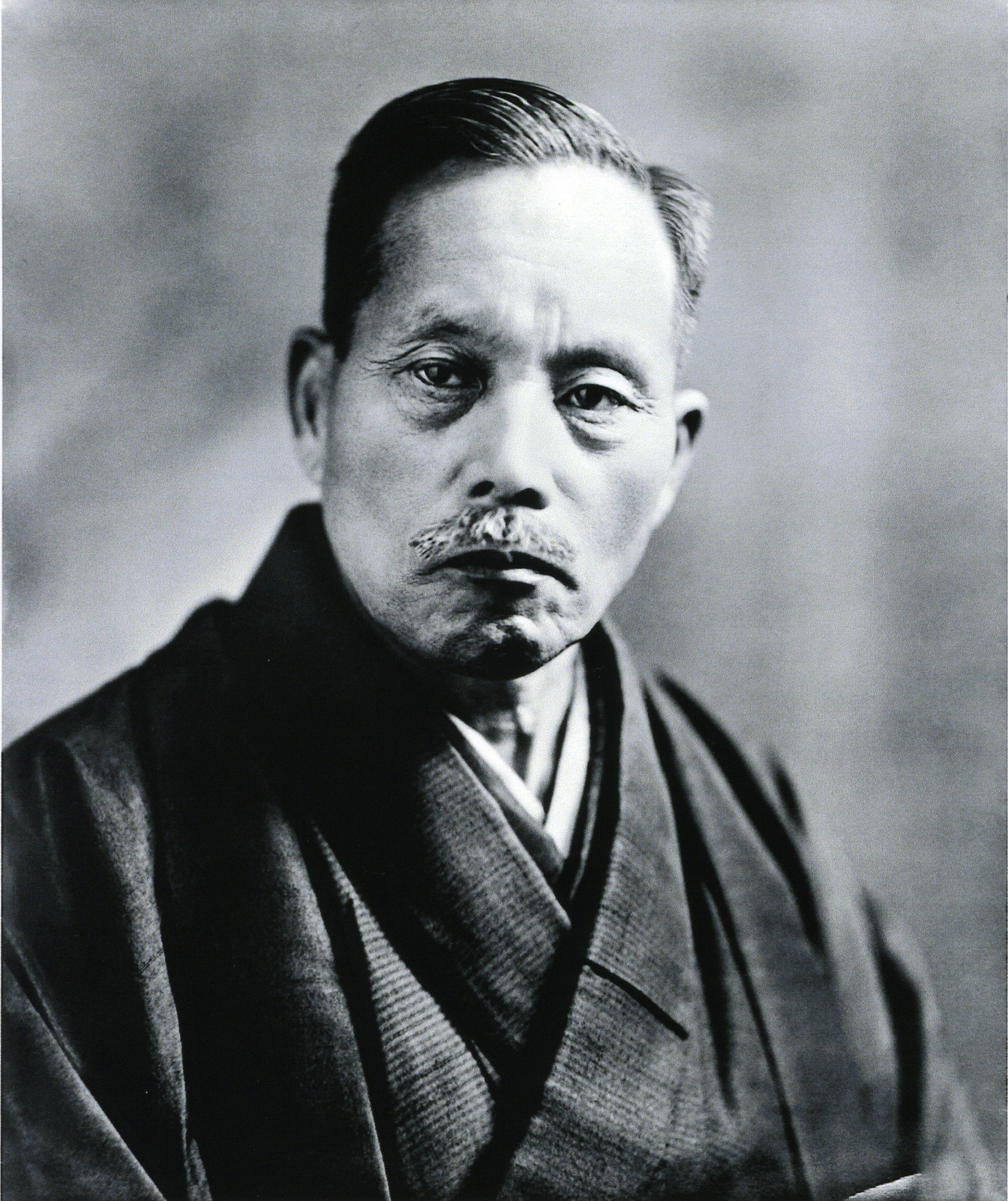
Tsunesaburō Makiguchi, the first President of the Sōka Gakkai

In 1928, educators Tsunesaburō Makiguchi and Jōsei Toda both converted to Nichiren Buddhism. The Soka Gakkai officially traces its foundation to November 1930, when Makiguchi and Toda published the first volume of Makiguchi's magnum opus on educational reform, Sōka Kyōikugaku Taikei (創価教育学体系, The System of Value-Creating Pedagogy). The first general meeting of the organization, then under the name Sōka Kyōiku Gakkai (創価教育学会, Value Creating Educational Society), took place in 1937.

The membership eventually came to change from teachers interested in educational reform to people from all walks of life, drawn by the religious elements of Makiguchi's beliefs in Nichiren Buddhism. The group had a focus on proselytization growing from an attendance of 60 people at its first meeting to about 300 at its next meeting in 1940.

=== Repression during the war ===
In 1942, a monthly magazine published by Makiguchi called Kachi Sōzō (価値創造, "Creating values") was shut down by the government, after only nine issues. Makiguchi, Toda, and 19 other leaders of the Soka Kyoiku Gakkai were arrested on July 6, 1943, on charges of breaking the Peace Preservation Law and lèse-majesté: for "denying the Emperor's divinity" and "slandering" the Ise Grand Shrine. The details of Makiguchi's indictment and subsequent interrogation were covered in July, August, and October 1943 classified monthly bulletins of the Special Higher Police.

With its leadership decimated, the Soka Kyoiku Gakkai disbanded. During interrogation, Makiguchi had insisted that "The emperor is an ordinary man ... the emperor makes mistakes like anyone else". The treatment in prison was harsh, and within a year, all but Makiguchi, Toda, and one other director had recanted and been released. On November 18, 1944, Makiguchi died of malnutrition in prison, at the age of 73.

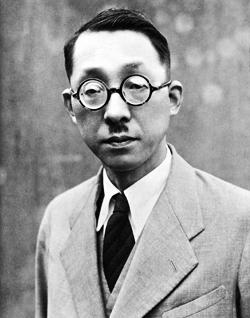
Jōsei Toda, the second President of the Sōka Gakkai

Jōsei Toda was released from prison on July 3, 1945, after serving two years of imprisonment on the charges of lèse majesté. He immediately set out to rebuild the organization that had been repressed and dismantled by the government during the war.

=== The reconstruction of the organization ===
Toda officially re-established the organization, now under the shortened moniker Sōka Gakkai ("Value-creation society"), integrated his prison awakenings into the doctrine of the Soka Gakkai, began locating members who had dispersed during the war, started a series of lectures on the Lotus Sutra and Nichiren's letters, undertook business ventures (largely unsuccessful) to provide a stream of revenue for the organization, provided personal encouragement to many members, launched a monthly study magazine Daibyaku Renge (大白蓮華), and the newspaper Seikyo Shimbun, launched propagation efforts, and involved the active participation of youth including Daisaku Ikeda who was to become his right-hand man and successor.

Noah Brannen, a Christian missionary writing in 1969, describes the Soka Gakkai's study program at this point as "the most amazing program of indoctrination Japan has ever seen". New members attended local study lectures, subscribed to weekly and monthly periodicals, studied Toda's commentaries on the Lotus Sutra, took annual study examinations, and were awarded titles for their achievements such as Associate Lecturer, Lecturer, Associate Teacher, or Teacher.

==== "The Great Propagation Drive" ====
The drive began with the 1951 inauguration speech of Josei Toda when he assumed the presidency of the organization. Before 1,500 assembled members, Toda resolved to convert 750,000 families before his death. The accuracy of this figure was never confirmed by outside sources. The primary vehicle of the propagation efforts were small group discussion meetings.

There are several competing narratives that attempt to explain how the Soka Gakkai was able to achieve this rapid growth. One narrative portrays a drive powered by the "seemingly unlimited enthusiasm" of its members that was masterminded by Toda and channeled by his younger followers. The organization's own publications articulate this narrative.

A second narrative examines the Soka Gakkai's expansion through a sociological lens. White, in the first English-language sociological work on the Soka Gakkai, attributes the growth, cohesion, and sustainability of the organization to the organizational skills of its leaders, its system of values and norms that match the individual needs of members, and its ability to adapt to changing times. According to Dator, the organizational structure of the Soka Gakkai, which values individual participation within small heterogeneous groups and parallel peer associations by age, gender, and interests, fulfills members' socio-psychological needs.

A third narrative tracks criticisms of the Soka Gakkai in the popular press and by other Buddhist sects. This narrative implies that the propagation efforts succeeded through intimidating and coercive actions committed by Soka Gakkai members such as the practice then of destroying the household Shinto altars of new members. There were reports of isolated incidents of violence conducted by Soka Gakkai members but also incidents directed toward them.

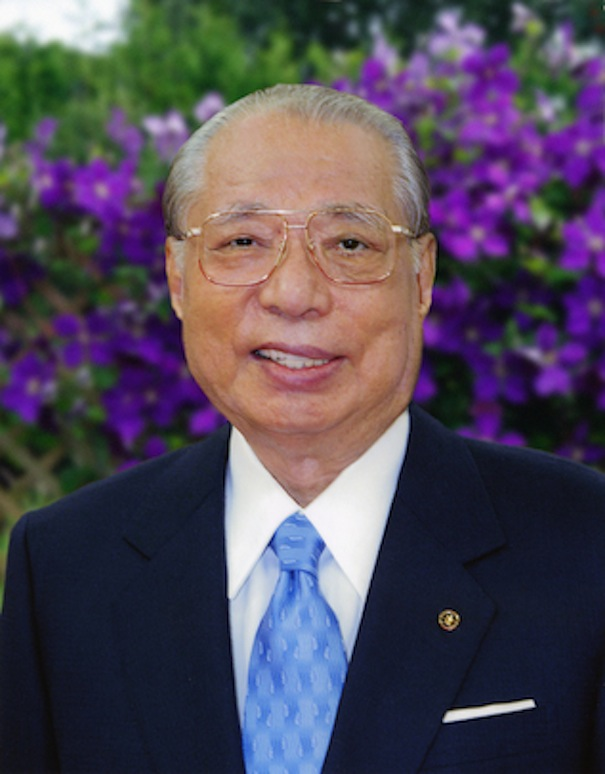
Daisaku Ikeda, third President of the Soka Gakkai, 2010

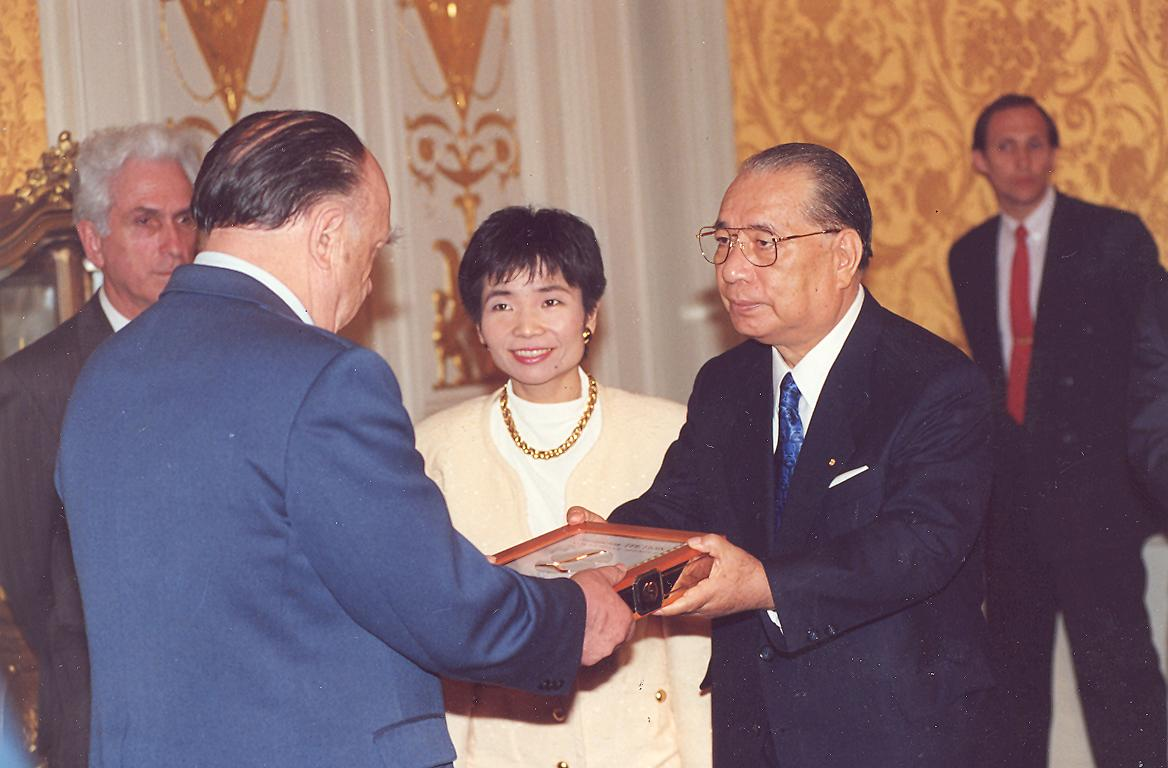
Daisaku Ikeda receiving the "Leonardo Prize" from Alexander Yakovlev

Jōsei Toda was succeeded as president in 1960 by the 32-year-old Daisaku Ikeda. Ikeda urged, from 1964, a gentler approach to proselytizing. Under Ikeda's leadership, the organization expanded rapidly, both inside and outside Japan during the 1960s.

Soka Gakkai's own narratives argue that within the first 16 months of Ikeda's presidency the organization grew from 1.3 million to 2.1 million members. By 1967 it grew to 6.2 million families according to its own reporting. By 1968, the daily Seikyo Shimbun newspaper is supposed to have attained a circulation of 3,580,000. Today, the Soka Gakkai claims it has a circulation of 5.5 million copies, but the number is controversial and impossible to verify since Seikyo Shinbun does not belong the Japan Newspaper Publishers and Editors Association nor the 日本ABC協会 who are officially in charge of the circulation numbers of Japanese newspapers.

=== International growth ===
In October 1960, five months after his inauguration, Ikeda and a small group of staff members visited the United States, Canada (Toronto), and Brazil. In the United States he visited Honolulu, San Francisco, Seattle, Chicago, New York, Washington, DC, and Los Angeles, meeting with members, the vast majority Japanese war brides, at discussion and guidance meetings, setting up local organizations, and appointing leaders to take responsibility.

Ikeda also expanded the scope and pattern of the Gakkai's activities. In 1961 he created an arm of the organization, the Culture Bureau, to accommodate nonreligious activities. It had departments for the study and discussion of Economics, Politics, Education, Speech, and, later in the year, the Arts.

Ikeda and his team visited countries in Europe and Southeast Asia in 1961 and the Near and Middle East in 1962. By 1967 Ikeda had completed 13 trips abroad to strengthen the overseas organizations.

The Gakkai's first overseas mission, called Nichiren Shoshu of America (NSA), grew rapidly and claimed some 200,000 American adherents by 1970. Ikeda founded Soka Junior and Senior High Schools in 1968 and Soka University in 1971. Soka Gakkai International (SGI) was formally founded in 1975, on Guam.

=== Founding of the Komeito ===
In 1961, Soka Gakkai formed the Komei Political League. Seven of its candidates were elected to the House of Councillors. In 1964 the Komeito (Clean Government Party) was formed by Ikeda. Over the course of several elections it became the third largest political party, typically amassing 10–15% of the popular vote. The New Komeito Party was founded in 1998 and has been allied with the Liberal Democratic Party (LDP) since 1999.

In 2014, the New Komeito was renamed Komeito again. Komeito generally supports the policy agenda of the LDP, including the reinterpretation of the pacifist Article 9 of the Constitution of Japan, proposed in 2014 by LDP Prime Minister Shinzō Abe to allow "collective defense" and to fight in foreign conflicts.

=== 1969: Crisis and transformation ===
In response to criticism, Ikeda made major shifts to the Gakkai's message. He committed the organization to the rights of free speech and freedom of religion, admitting it had been intolerant and overly sensitive in the past.

In the 1970s Ikeda helped transition the Soka Gakkai from an internally focused organization centered on its own membership growth to one adopting a focus on a motto of "Peace, Culture, and Education". On October 12, 1972, at the official opening of the Shohondo at Taiseki-ji Ikeda announced the start of the Soka Gakkai's "Phase Two" which would shift direction from aggressive expansion to a movement for international peace through friendship and exchange.

=== Scandals in the 1990s ===
Nichiren Shōshū excommunicated the Soka Gakkai and the Soka Gakkai International (SGI) on 28 November 1991 due to doctrinal conflicts and the reputation of the Soka Gakkai, at that time entangled in political and financial scandals.

In 1991, the Soka Gakkai had to pay $4.5 million in back taxes on 2.4 billion yen (US$1.7 million) of undeclared income.

== Former relations with the Nichiren Shoshu sect ==
Generally speaking, Soka Gakkai and Nichiren Shōshū worked in harmony before 1990, although there were moments of tension. An early example of strained relations came during World War II, in 1943, when the Nichiren sect's headquarters at Taiseki-ji was willing to comply with Japanese government demands to enshrine a Shinto talisman of the Sun Goddess Amaterasu inside the temple. Makiguchi and Toda, on the other hand, angrily rebuked Taiseki-ji for doing so, and the two were jailed for refusing to do the same (Makiguchi would also die while in prison).

Nikken Abe excommunicated Soka Gakkai and its senior leaders in November 1991, citing doctrinal deviations, the Soka Gakkai's usurpation of rites such as the Higan-e equinox ceremonies and funerals without Nichiren Shoshu priests officiating, its defiant staging of Ode to Joy concerts that, for their Christian themes, were incongruent with Nichiren Shoshu doctrine, and a speech (which became public when a recording was leaked) by then Soka Gakkai President Daisaku Ikeda. It also condemned Ikeda for abandoning the aggressive propagation style (shakubuku) that led to some social criticism of the lay group, though not the priesthood. In response, the Soka Gakkai countered by outlining Nichiren Shoshu's deviation from their own interpretation of Nichiren's doctrines, along with accusations of simony and hedonism among its ranking priests.

The priesthood further accused the organization of impiety and sacrilegious behavior, citing the song "Ode to Joy" along with the promotion of its musical performance, Beethoven's Ninth Symphony, as evidence for non-Buddhist teachings.

In 2014, the Soka Gakkai rewrote its bylaws to reflect that it no longer had any relationship with Nichiren Shoshu or its doctrine.

== Outreach ==
In the 1970s, the Soka Gakkai began to re-conceptualize itself as an organization promoting the theme of "Peace, culture, and education." "Since its beginning – and especially under Ikeda’s leadership - Soka Gakkai has struggled to relate its image to the ideal of an international organization committed to social causes", analyses scholar Suzana Ramos Coutinho Bornholdt in Japanese Buddhism and Social Action: the case of Soka Gakkai.

Ikeda also founded the Tokyo Fuji Art Museum in 1983. It houses collections of western and oriental art, and has participated in exchanges with museums around the world.

The Soka Gakkai has participated in many activities and exhibitions in conjunction with the UN. The Soka Gakkai has established multiple institutions and research facilities.

This social and cultural projects also appear to be part of a strategy, according to some scholars and critics of Soka Gakkai, which "uses the image and practice of an NGO (to respond) to its own necessity: the recruitment and maintenance of membership" and "tries to create the image of an institution engaged in activities to promote peace, culture and education based on Buddhism, clearly following the tendencies of national politics.".

== Organization ==
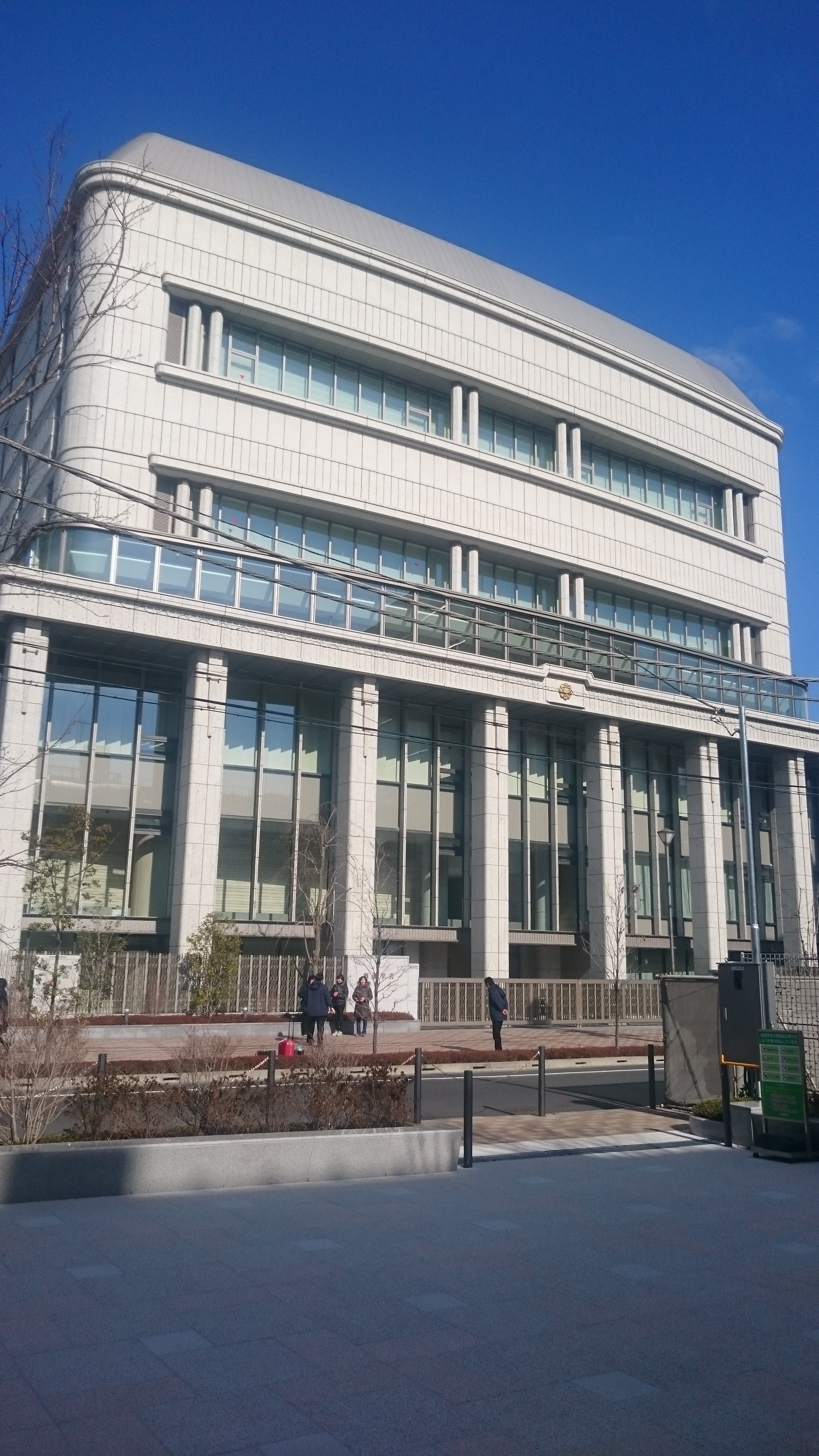
Hall of the Great Vow for Kosen-rufu (Kosen-rufu Daiseido)

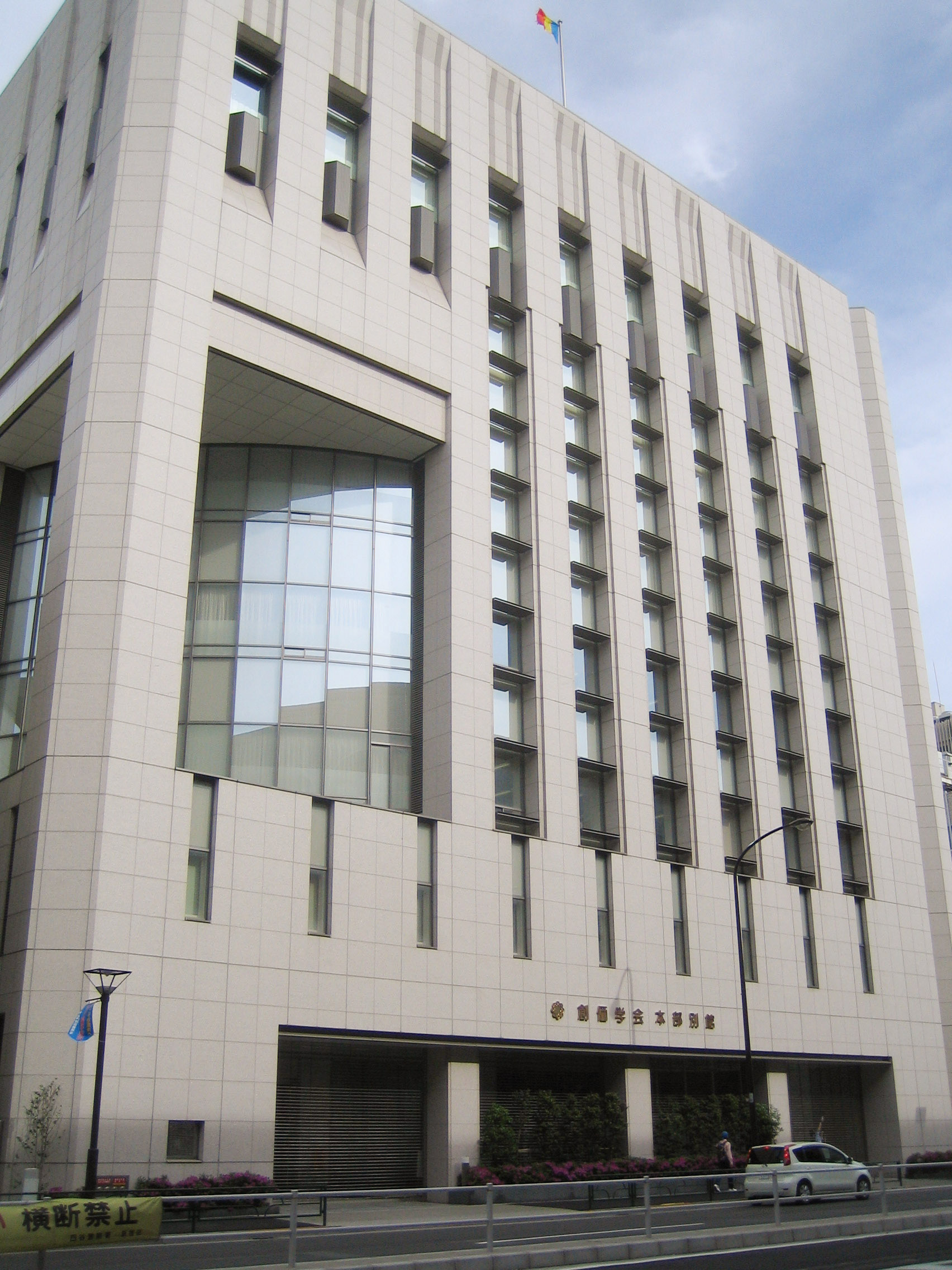
Soka Gakkai's Tokyo headquarters

Formally, the Soka Gakkai International is the umbrella organization for all national organizations, while Soka Gakkai by itself refers to the Japanese arm.

The basic functional organizational unit is the Block – a group of members in a neighborhood who meet regularly for discussion, study and encouragement. A number of Blocks form a District, and Districts are grouped into Chapters. From there the Soka Gakkai is organized into Areas, Regions, Prefectures and, finally, Territories – all under the umbrella of the national organization. Discussion and study meetings, the basic organizational activities, are conducted mainly at the Block level, though there are occasional meetings held at every level.

=== Membership ===
Soka Gakkai International claims a total of over 12 million adherents. The majority of these belong to the Japanese organization, whose official membership count is 8.27 million households. However, this is the figure put forward by the organization itself, and is not supported by any independent count. According to the work of American academic Levi McLaughlin, membership in Japan is closer to 2-3% of the country's population, or between 2.4 and 4 million people.

In a 1996 NHK survey, it was found that Soka Gakkai adherent made up somewhere around 3.2% of the Japanese population, or somewhere around 4 million individuals. According to statistics from the Agency for Cultural Affairs (a body of the Japanese Ministry of Education), the Japanese organization had 5.42 million individual members in 2000.

In a 2002–2003 survey of 602 Soka Gakkai adherents living in Sapporo, Hokkaido who had at least one child over the age of 18, it was found that 65.9% of those members' adult children were also themselves active members. Additionally, it was found that among the siblings of 418 second-generation members, collectively speaking, 69.5% of all those siblings were also active members. A further analysis found that "higher degrees of parental religiosity, better family relationships, and higher levels of participation in youth groups" contributed to higher degrees of religiosity among Soka Gakkai children during middle school years, although this effect was more pronounced in women than in men.

A study in Europe found that most of new members joined because of the personalities of the people they met within the organization; but the biggest reason for continuing is the positive changes they see in their own lives.

=== List of Soka Gakkai presidents ===
The following are the list of the presidents of the Soka Gakkai:

1. Tsunesaburō Makiguchi – (18 November 1930 – 18 November 1944)
2. Jōsei Toda – (3 May 1951 – 2 April 1958)
3. Daisaku Ikeda – (3 May 1960 – 24 April 1979) + (Honorary President of the Soka Gakkai International: 1979 – 2023)
4. Hiroshi Hōjō – (24 April 1979 – 18 July 1981)
5. Einosuke Akiya – (18 July 1981 – 9 November 2006)
6. Minoru Harada – (9 November 2006 – incumbent)

== Economic and social influence ==
The Soka Gakkai is the head of a media, political and financial empire. Levi McLaughlin writes that "exerts considerable influence in the fields of education, media, finance, and culture throughout Japan".

=== Tax situation ===
Legally declared in Japan as a religious juridical person since 1952, Soka Gakkai is not subject to taxation as an organization.

Though, it has been sued by Japanese tax authorities in 1991 for evading taxes on profits of 2.3 billion yen, which were obtained through tombstone transactions.

=== Assets ===
Estimates about Soka Gakkai’s financial assets are imperfect since "they cannot accurately assess the full value of the Gakkai’s thousands of facilities, its stocks and other investments, its holdings overseas, or Ikeda Daisaku’s personal wealth".

According to the magazine Shûkan Daiyamondo (June 2016), the assets of the organization include fourteen corporations, investments in 331 other companies for 18 billion yens, holding overseas, and real estate holdings. Forbes magazine estimated (2004) that the organization has an income of at least $1.5 billion per year. In 2008, religion scholar Hiroshi Shimada has estimated the wealth of the Soka Gakkai at ¥500 billion.

=== Press and publishing companies ===
Daisaku Ikeda's writings are the roots of a massive publishing and media enterprise. The Gakkai's newspaper, Seikyō shinbun, has an important readership base. But it is only sold in Soka Gakkai's venues, and mainly bought and read by Soka Gakkai's members, though its print run is impossible to verify.

The Soka Gakkai owns publishing companies, in Japan but also abroad. They are in charge of the translation and publishing of The Human Revolution, Daisaku's Ikeda novel (World Tribune Press in the USA; Eternal Ganges in India; Soka Gakkai International Publishers Group in Germany...)

== Perception ==
=== In Japan ===
Today, Soka Gakkai is rarely criticized in mainstream news media. Since the Komeito Party joined the ruling government coalition in 1999, widespread criticism by the media of the Soka Gakkai has abated and the Soka Gakkai is gaining acceptance as part of the Japanese mainstream. There has been a "fractured view" of the Soka Gakkai in Japan. On the one hand, it is seen as a politically and socially engaged movement; on the other, it is still viewed with suspicion by Japanese people.

==== International perception ====
Soka Gakkai was listed as one of the 173 cults by a report, which was published by the parliamentary commission in France in 1995. Like the other groups identified as a cult on the list, Soka Gakkai was not banned in the country by this identification. In May 2005, Jean-Pierre Raffarin made a notice telling the list be no longer used.

In 2015, Italian prime minister Matteo Renzi signed an agreement that recognizes the Soka Gakkai as a "Concordat" that grants the religions status in "a special 'club' of denominations consulted by the government in certain occasions, and, perhaps more importantly, to be partially financed by taxpayers' money." Eleven other religious denominations share this status.

== Controversies ==
In 1969, prominent university professor Fujiwara Hirotatsu authored the book I Denounce Soka Gakkai (Soka Gakkai o kiru) in which he severely criticized the Gakkai. The Gakkai and Kōmeitō attempted to use their political power to suppress its publication. When Fujiwara went public with the attempted suppression, the Soka Gakkai was harshly criticized in the Japanese media.

=== Cult status ===
Soka Gakkai has been described as a cult. Particular controversies have arisen around its entry into politics with the New Komeito and an alleged cult of personality surrounding former leader Daisaku Ikeda. Seizaburo Sato, deputy director of the National Graduate Institute for Policy Studies, described Soka Gakkai as "a dictatorship built around the person of one man." Soka Gakkai members have made arson attacks and bomb threat against rival groups, as well as wiretapping the house of the Communist Party of Japan leader. Soka Gakkai has distanced themselves from these members and attributed their actions to mental illness. Rick Alan Ross, cult specialist and founder of the nonprofit Cult Education Institute, considers them a "destructive cult" and claims to have "received serious complaints from former members and from family members."

=== Sexual assault allegation ===
In June 1996, Nobuko Nobuhira, a long-time Sokka Gakkai member, filed a 75 million yen civil suit against Ikeda, alleging that he raped her on three occasions, including at the sect's facilities and on a street in Hokkaido. Sokka Gakkai lawyers denied these claims, calling them "groundless fabrications motivated by personal resentment" and alleging that Nobuhira had extorted money from Soka Gakkai members. The lawsuit was dismissed in 1996, and an appeal was denied in 2006.

=== Lawsuit versus U.S. Army Corps of Engineers ===
In 2025, Soka Gakkai International-USA filed a lawsuit attempting to stop an Army Corps of Engineers construction project which Soka Gakkai claimed would interfere with the group's religious practice at a retreat center in the Florida Everglades. The group contends that the Corps' planned 7-story high pump station and water-impounded area would interfere with the serenity of the retreat center, and that the project is unlawful because the Corps allegedly did not study the environmental impact the project would have. The Corps disputed the group's allegations and stated that the project is crucial to improving the flow of water in the Everglades, and that it has planned a sound barrier and wildlife fencing around the project to mitigate concerns. In January 2025, a federal Magistrate Judge denied Soka Gakkai's request for a preliminary injunction to halt the project, ruling that the group's claims of harm were too speculative to support a preliminary injunction.

== See also ==
- New religious movement
- Religion in Japan
- Buddhism in Japan
- Death of Akiyo Asaki

== Bibliography ==
- Sōka Gakkai's Human Revolution. The Rise of a Mimetic Nation in Modern Japan, Levi McLaughlin · Honolulu, University of Hawaii Press, 2019, 236 p
- Sōka Gakkai in America: Accommodation and Conversion By Phillip E. Hammond and David W. Machacek. London: Oxford University Press, ISBN 0-19-829389-5
- "The Sōka Gakkai: Buddhism and the Creation of a Harmonious and Peaceful Society" by Daniel A. Metraux in Engaged Buddhism: Buddhist Liberation Movements in Asia. Christopher S. Queen and Sallie B. King, eds. SUNY Press, 1996.
- The New Believers: A survey of sects, cults and alternative religions. David V Barrett. Octopus Publishing Group, 2003
- The Lotus and the Maple Leaf: The Sōka Gakkai in Canada by Daniel A. Metraux (University Press of America, 1996)
- Sōka Gakkai kaibō ("Dissecting Sōka Gakkai") by the editors of Aera (Asahi Shimbun, 2000). ISBN 4-02-261286-X (Japanese)
- A Public Betrayed: An Inside Look at Japanese Media Atrocities and Their Warnings to the West. Adam Gamble & Takesato Watanabe. Regnery Publishing, Inc., 2004. ISBN 0-89526-046-8
- (SERA) Southeast Review of Asian Studies 29 (2007). "Religion, Politics, and Constitutional Reform in Japan," by Daniel Metraux, 157–72.
- Westward Dharma: Buddhism beyond Asia. Charles S. Prebish and Martin Baumann, eds. 2002.
- Proselytizing and the Limits of Religious Pluralism in Contemporary Asia By Juliana Finucane, R. Michael Feener, pages 103 122.
- Neo Yeow Ann Aaron "Studying Soka: Buddhist Conversionn And Religious Change In Singapore" (PDF).
