= Jōsei Toda =

Educator and second president of Soka Gakkai

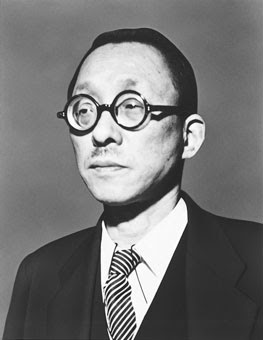
- Toda in May 1951

2nd President of Soka Gakkai
- In office 3 May 1951 - 2 April 1958
- Preceded by: Tsunesaburō Makiguchi
- Succeeded by: Daisaku Ikeda

Personal details
- Born: 11 February 1900 Kaga, Ishikawa Prefecture, Japan
- Died: 2 April 1958 (aged 58) Surugadai Nihon University Hospital, Chiyoda, Tokyo, Japan
- Resting place: Jozai-ji Temple, Minami-Ikebukuro, Toshima, Japan (1958–2000); Taiseki-ji Head Temple by Gojunoto Pagoda, (left frontside) Fujinomiya, Shizuoka Prefecture, Japan (since 2001–Present)
- Education: Chuo University

Jōsei Toda (戸田 城聖, Toda Jōsei; 11 February 1900 – 2 April 1958) was a teacher, peace activist and second president of Soka Gakkai from 1951 to 1958. Imprisoned for two years during World War II under violating the Peace Preservation Law and the charge of lèse-majesté from against the war, he emerged from prison intent on rebuilding the Soka Gakkai. He has been described as the architect of the Soka Gakkai, the person chiefly responsible for its existence today.

Toda was the disciple of Tsunesaburō Makiguchi and mentor of Daisaku Ikeda, respectively the first and third presidents of the Soka Gakkai. He used the term "human revolution" to embrace Makiguchi's thoughts on the pursuits of education and happiness in life as "inextricably connected in a lifelong journey toward continual self-development." Toda's leadership in building the Soka Gakkai is the theme of Ikeda's 12-volume roman à clef, "The Human Revolution" ("Ningen kakumei")

== Early life ==
Toda was born in 1900, the eleventh son of a fisherman's family in the coastal village of Shioya, in modern-day Kaga, Ishikawa, off the Sea of Japan. In 1904 his family moved to Hokkaido, settling in the fishing village of Atsuta. From the age of 15 he worked his way through school, earning certification first as a substitute primary school teacher at age 17 then, three years later, as a full-time primary school teacher. In 1920 he moved to Tokyo where he met Tsunesaburo Makiguchi, an elementary school principal, who was to become his mentor. He taught for Makiguchi until 1922, after which he opened a private school and tutored students preparing for their middle-school entrance exams.

Toda and his wife suffered the loss of a six-month old daughter in 1923 and his wife died two years later from tuberculosis. Toda contracted the same illness and was often ill.

His financial fortunes changed with the successful publication and reception of his arithmetic tutorial book.

== Personality ==
After he began teaching in Yubari, young coalminers in the area would come to his home after work to discuss issues such as politics and history. It is documented that he also submitted an education reform proposal to the Ministry of Education containing ideas to improve the conditions of teachers as well as developing more capable school leaders. According to a diary entry in 1920, part of his reason for moving from Hokkaido to Tokyo was an ambition to become "a world citizen."

Toda's vivid personality stood in stark contrast to that of his mentor, Tsunesaburo Makiguchi who was a scholar and pedagogue. Toda has been described as "a hard-sell pitchman for his faith—frank, vigorous, often rude, talkative. He had the ability to vividly and strongly articulate the ideas of Nichiren and Makiguchi.

Toda also evidenced strength in organizational innovation, in establishing a grid of vertical and horizontal communication lines that lent cohesiveness to the Soka Gakkai's organizational structure.

== Educator ==
Although Toda's work in education is best known through his editing and financing Makiguchi's System of Value-Creating Pedagogy, he was also active as a teacher and author.

=== Early work as an educator ===
Toda's first teaching assignment was at Mayachi Primary School, located in a remote section of Ubari, Hokkaido, a coal-mining town. He started working there in 1918 as a substitute teacher and a year later was appointed as a 6th grade teacher upon passing a certification exam. He quit suddenly in 1920 but remained in correspondence with his students for 15 years.

The most exhaustive treatment of Toda's educational ideas is by Shiohara. According to Shiohara, Toda derived a teaching method from his own research specifically geared to meet the needs of his Miyachi elementary school students, who came from disadvantaged backgrounds and suffered low grades.

Makiguchi hired Toda as a substitute teacher at Nishimachi Elementary School. Toda changed positions in order to keep working with Makiguchi when the latter was forcefully transferred to Mikasa Elementary School, a school for poorer students in Tokyo.

=== Jishu Gakkan ===
Rather than traveling with Makiguchi to Shirokane Elementary School when Makiguchi was forcefully transferred again, Toda opened a tutorial school called Jishu Gakkan where he applied value-creating pedagogy in an independent setting. Toda rented a vacant lot near Meguro Station and built a two-story facility which formally opened in 1924. Jishu Gakkan operated for two decades, earning a prominent reputation for its success rate in preparing pupils for secondary-level entrance examinations.

Toda used a liberal and creative approach to study developed in consultation with Makiguchi. Ikeda described Jishu Gakkan in the opening chapter of his semi-fictionalized biography of Toda.

=== Publication of "The System of Value-Creating Pedagogy" ===
Makiguchi's major work, The System of Value-Creating Pedagogy, was published on November 18, 1930. This event marks the day the Soka Gakkai considers as its founding. Makiguchi parallels Toda's role in publishing this book to that of Christen Mikkelsen Kold who popularized the educational ideas of N. F. S. Grundtvig in Denmark.

Toda organized Makiguchi's enormous volume of scribbled notes into a manuscript which Makiguchi then thoroughly reviewed. The System of Value-Creating Pedagogy was ultimately published by Fuzanbo, of which Taizo Oinuma, the publisher of Makiguchi's Geography of Human Life, was a manager. Four volumes were published between 1930 and 1932. During the difficult years of publishing, Toda also organized the parents of many of his Jishu Gakkan students who were also students at Shirokane Elementary School to protest and ultimately delay Makiguchi's forced retirement from Shirokane. As a result, Makiguchi was able to publish the first two volumes as an incumbent school principal, just as he wished.

Toda was active in creating a prominent group of 28 supporters who endorsed The System of Value-Creating Pedagogy, including Tsuyoshi Inukai, who was to rise to become prime minister of Japan in 1931. The first volume of The System of Value-Creating Pedagogy included a calligraphy by Inukai as well as forewords by Inazo Nitobe, who at that time was one of the Under-Secretaries General of the League of Nations, sociologist Suketoshi Tanabe, and the folklorist Kunio Yanagita.

=== Additional educational publications ===
Toda's first published work, Katei Kyoikugaku Soron (An Anatomy of Home Education: Talking about entrance exams for middle level school, and turning our precious children into straight-A students), published in December 1929, was based on Makiguchi's work before the publishing of The System of Value-Creating Pedagogy. He forcefully denounced "entrance examination hell" and the predicament of students who are devalued because of their poor grades. He blames teachers who try to educate children uniformly, ignoring their unique interests and perspectives. In 1930 he published the Suirisiki Sido Sanjutsu (Guidebook to Mathematics Through Reasoning based on the principles of Value-Creating Pedagogy). This became a best seller selling over one million copies. Makiguchi credited this book as being an excellent example of his theories, resulting in "an economy to learning," helping students achieve remarkable progress in the development of mathematical understanding as they develop their own powers of reasoning, and fostering their abilities to reason their way to "the life of value."

Toda also founded and edited an educational magazine dedicated to spreading and promoting Value-Creating Pedagogy entitled Shinshin Kyozai Kankyo (New Teaching Material: The Environment). The educational magazine continued as a series for more than six years, changing its title from New Collection of Teaching Materials, to New Teaching Materials, and, finally, to Educational Remodeling. In these research magazines he helped elementary school teachers to put Makiguchi's pedagogy into practice.

In addition to these editing and publishing assignments, Toda wrote two works, Guidelines for Teaching Mathematics and The Establishment of the System of Value-Creating Pedagogy, both based on the principles of value-creating education. He expanded his methodologies to other fields. He published four books for fifth and sixth graders entitled Guidance on Reading Through Reasoning. Although never published, he edited the book Guidance on the Three Subjects of Science, Geography and History, which applied the system of Value-Creating Pedagogy to these fields. His final pre-war contribution to education came in the January of 1940 when Toda launched a magazine for learning, entitled Shogakusei Nihon (Elementary School Children Japan) which included correspondence materials. In each issue, he contributed a foreword and poured his passion into editing duties. He managed this despite strict restrictions imposed in the nation's system of militarism support.

== Co-founder of Soka Kyoiku Gakkai ==
Following Makiguchi, Toda began practicing Nichiren Shoshu Buddhism some time between 1928 and 1930, which brought a "spiritual dimension" to their work on Makiguchi's educational theories and underlying premise that each individual has potential. Apparently Toda was initially not as eager as Makiguchi in his new faith but, out of respect and gratitude, followed his mentor's direction and attributed his personal successes to Makiguchi's teachings of modern philosophy combined with lay Nichiren Buddhism.

Toda supported the editing and publication of Makiguchi's Sōka kyōikugaku taikei ("The System of Value-Creating Pedagogy") which was published in 1930 and marked the founding of the Sōka Kyōiku Gakkai ("Value Creation Education Society"), the organization that preceded the Soka Gakkai.

It appears that Toda financed much of the operations of the Soka Kyoiku Gakkai singlehandedly. His pre-war net worth was more than ¥6,000,000, approximately 9,500,000USD in today's currency. (Note: Currency conversion according to measuringworth.com) Toda served as chairperson of the board of directors. His tutoring school had signage above the door bearing the name of the Soka Kyoiku Gakkai, perhaps indicating that it was used as the organization's convening place. He did cite his faith as the reason for his business success.

Although he provided financial support to the Soka Kyoiku Gakkai, Toda appeared to be more interested in his business activities. He expanded his holdings to control 17 companies. He enjoyed drinking parties with his employees and Soka Kyoiku Gakkai members.

== Imprisonment during World War II ==
Makiguchi and Toda were arrested and jailed by the government in 1943 on charges of blasphemy against the deified emperor (lèse-majesté) and violating the 1925 Peace Preservation Law. At first intended to suppress "thought crimes" of left-leaning groups, the law was amended in 1941 to include religious organizations. Toda and Makiguchi were among the approximate 80,000 people arrested for violating this law between 1925 and 1945. A total of 21 Soka Kyoiku Gakkai leaders were arrested and this effectively shuttered the Soka Kyoiku Gakkai organization. Makiguchi died in prison in 1944, and Toda was released just weeks before Japan's surrender in 1945.

During his incarceration Toda endured malnutrition, interrogation and physical abuse without succumbing to his interrogators' demand that he recant his faith. At the start of 1944 Toda began meditating, studying, and chanting fiercely to understand the Lotus Sutra. He experienced two awakenings that had an enduring effect on the rest of his life. The first was a realization in March that the Buddha can be conceived of as "the essence of cosmic life itself" and therefore an inherent dignity shared by all human beings, which resulted in the quality of fearlessness in Toda's life. A second awakening took place in November 1944 when he became convinced that he was, in fact, one of the Bodhisattvas of the Earth, the mythic figures who appear in the Lotus Sutra and symbolize the inherent compassionate qualities within all people. From this realization Toda envisioned modern prospects of a movement whereby people awaken to life's inherent dignity and teach others to do the same.

He was released from prison on July 3, 1945, in failing health, severely impacted by malnutrition and harsh living conditions. Yet his prison experiences enabled him to undergo an inner transformation that brought to light his qualities of courage, wisdom, compassion, as well as an enhanced capacity for dialogue.

== Reconstructor of Soka Gakkai ==
Released from prison on July 3, 1945, six weeks before the surrender of Japan on August 15, and physically weakened by his two years of imprisonment, Toda began reconstructing the Soka Kyoiku Gakkai.

His first task was to rebuild his businesses which he saw as the financial underpinning of the new organization. During the war he had accumulated more than ¥2,000,000 of debt. He attempted businesses starting with correspondence courses. The post-war business climate was tumultuous and racked by inflation and scarcity of materials. Many of his ventures met with failure.

News of his release began to spread and many prewar members came to consult with him to rebuild their personal faith. Toda began to sponsor study lectures on the Lotus Sutra and Nichren's writings and he presided over small group discussion meetings. On May 1 Toda was appointed chair of the board of directors. The organization name was changed from Soka Kyoiku Gakkai to Soka Gakkai, publications resumed, a youth division was organized, and membership grew by about 200 members in 1946. On August 14, 1947, Daisaku Ikeda attended a discussion meeting and met Toda; he joined the Soka Gakkai ten days later.

Ultimately Toda had to resign his position on November 12, 1950, due to his business failures. He regarded these business failures as "divine retribution for failure to devote himself to leading Soka Gakkai." After deep reflection he assented to the role of second president on May 3, 1951. At that time the membership consisted of approximately 3,000 families. At his inauguration he announced to the 1500 assembled members his determination to reach a membership of 750,000 families before his death, a target that was met with disbelief from most of the attendees.

== Toda's contributions to the growth of the Soka Gakkai ==
Toda made several important and lasting contributions to the Soka Gakkai.

=== Initiator of the movement's doctrine of "the oneness of mentor and disciple" ===
Toda's accomplishments as the second president of the Soka Gakkai are a crucial link in the Soka Gakkai lineage referred to as "the oneness of mentor and disciple. Toda was the only one of Makiguchi's disciples who did not disavow his faith and so remained in prison. He inherited the legacy of Makiguchi and transformed the group, which had collapsed during the war, into a mass movement dedicated to personal and societal transformation. In so doing he reshaped Makiguchi's philosophy of value creation to the pressing needs of people in postwar Japan. He formed a "living bond between Makiguchi and Ikeda." Over the course of eleven years of training, he raised Daisaku Ikeda who then led the Soka Gakkai for over 50 years.

Strand notes that most religious movements have a trio of founders, corresponding to the three phases of "creation, development, and stabilization". In the case of the Soka Gakkai Makiguchi's was the act of creation. Toda took on the difficult work of formation. He provided the crucial link between the initiator, Makiguchi, and Ikeda who led the third task of international evangelism.

=== Delineator of the Soka Gakkai's "life philosophy" ===
Early traces of Toda's "life philosophy" can be found in his first published textbook, An Anatomy of Home Education, as well as his most successful textbook, A Deductive Guide to Arithmetic.

Toda's epiphanous realizations in 1943 and 1944, while confined to a cell in Sugamo prison, conceptually linked the vitalistic, inexhaustible "life force" of the Buddha and his sense of mission as among the Bodhisattvas of the Earth with Makiguchi's philosophy. Toda equated this with "the true meaning of life."

Later Toda captured these realizations in the term "human revolution" which entailed transforming one's karma through Buddhist practice. This term was borrowed from a phrased used by Shigeru Nambara, president of the University of Tokyo, in 1947. The latter called for an inner transformation in the Japanese people to enable the success of occupation policies geared for social and political revolution. Toda used this term as the title of his autobiography published in 1957.

After his release, Toda lectured and wrote extensively about his realizations, now calling them a "life force philosophy" (also translated as "philosophy of life") ("seimeiron"). As McLaughlin concludes: "When Toda emerged from prison half a year later, he was driven not only by obligation to the memory of his master Makiguchi but by a sense of mission confirmed during his mystical experience that he was personally connected to Nichiren, to the primordial Buddha Śākyamuni, and to the eternal Dharma."

=== Publisher of Nichiren's complete works ===
Toda believed that the wartime collapse of the Soka Kyoiku Gakkai was due to a weakness in the "doctrinal discipline of its members." According to McLaughlin, upon his 1951 inauguration and declaration of "The Great Shakubuku March," his first priority was quickly publishing doctrinal study materials. In preparation, he shifted the contents of his study lectures from explanations on the Lotus Sutra to studies on Nichiren's writings. He also created a Study Department consisting of 24 leading students who also gave local lectures.

The first product of the Study Department was Shakubuku kyoten (The Shakubuku Manual), published on November 18, 1951, which served to instruct members on how it exceeded other belief systems, and Makiguchi's theory of value. It spelled out the benefits of proselytizing and also provided detailed guidance about how to proselytize under different circumstances. The manual underwent eight editions and 39 printings, and included chapters on Makiguchi's theory of value and Toda's "philosophy of life."

The second project Toda undertook was the collection of the extant writings of Nichiren. Throughout its 700-year history, Nichiren Shoshu, although claiming it was the orthodox teaching of Nichiren, had not produced its own canon of Nichiren's writings and had to rely on collections produced by other sects. Often these collections omitted writings of Nichiren the sect deemed as essential, such as the Ongi Kuden (The Record of the Orally Transmitted Teachings). Toda offered to sponsor a definitive publication of Nichiren's writings based on the beliefs of Nichiren Shoshu. The work was completed in less than a year by members of the Study Department under the supervision of Nichiko Hori, the retired 59th high priest of Nichiren Shoshu. The resulting one-volume compilation, Shimpen Nichiren Daishonin gosho zenshu (New Edition of the Complete Writings of Nichiren Daishonin), was published on April 28, 1952, to commemorate the 700th anniversary of Nichiren's proclamation of his teachings in 1253, and remains the Soka Gakkai's most important source for its Nichiren Buddhist practice.

=== Initiator of a Youth Division ===
Soon after his inauguration, Toda created a section called the "Young Men's Division" on July 11, 1951. Its inaugural meeting consisted of 187 members who were divided into four "corps." Among the attendees was Daisaku Ikeda who was to become Toda's successor. In Toda's speech he outlined his vision that the young men would lead his propagation campaign, comparing them to the youth who were the vanguard of the Meiji Restoration. The "Young Women's Division" was formed on July 19, 1951, with seventy members organized into five corps.

According to McLaughlin, this was Toda's second key initiative toward achieving his propagation goal: "attracting and mobilizing a youth base ... charged with primary responsibility to achieve the spread of kosen rufu."

The aggressive propagation style of the Youth Division, which also employed military-sounding organizational terms including "corps commander" and "staff office," drew increasingly alarmist press coverage. In addition to propagating the religion to neighbors, Youth Division members challenged other sects to religious debates. Though their propagation efforts were depicted by one scholar as "belligerent, activist, and ideological", the Youth Division grew exponentially, reaching a 10,390 members by the end of 1954.

=== Architect of the Soka Gakkai movement, a practical Buddhism ===
According to McLaughlin, Toda's third initiative for the Great March of Shakubuku was creating a vision of Buddhism that is practical and attainable. To the people of the tumultuous post-war period, Toda used language that was optimistic and focused on progress. He spoke in an intuitive rather than esoteric way, for example referring to the Gohonzon as "a happiness-producing machine." He spoke to the real problems members were facing such as economic woes, illness, and family discord, stressing the fundamentals of chanting daimoku and conversion.

Shimazono states that the doctrines developed by Toda represent a significant departure from the theology of the Nichiren Shoshu sect as well as of the Gakkai's founder, Makiguchi. Toda's vision, reshaping the traditional teachings of Nichiren Shoshu, was one of this-worldly salvation similar to other modern and popular Buddhist movements. Toda stressed that practice of Nichiren Buddhism, of which propagation efforts were an essential component, would result in secular benefits. In fact, he stressed that faith must be actualized through victories in daily life.

Membership grew rapidly under Toda's leadership, to more than 750,000 households by December 25, 1957, just months before his death on April 2, 1958.

Scholars have put forth different theories to account for Toda's success in building the Soka Gakkai. The media have pointed to aggressive propagation which sometimes resulted in violent removal of other religious artifacts from the homes of new members. The author questions, in contemporary terms, whether forced activities could result in the spontaneous actions needed to sustain a campaign.

Other scholars point to the success in finding a willing and sympathetic substratum of society to serve as its base. Toda made repeated references to "the poor and the sick," making it evident that his propagation campaign was aimed at such people and, Murata concludes, "evidently, for many of them, their new faith worked." Media impressions also portrayed the Soka Gakkai as "a conglomeration of lower social elements —the working class, the less educated, the low in status." According to Dower, after the war the Japanese population displayed a "kyodatsu condition," a mass state of personal and collective disorientation and depression characterized by war-weariness, sickness, malnutrition, numbness, and despair as many people poured into cities in search of work and food. To these people Toda's reconceptualization of a Buddha with life force and his focus on Buddhism as a transformative force in culture and politics had appeal which resulted in rapid growth in the early 1950s.

White, on the other hand, recognizes the unique personality of Toda and its effect on youth: to them he was "the great master, the transmitter of the teachings, the commander and guide." Metraux emphasizes Toda's ability to empathize with and counsel the suffering people of his time; he had strong organizational abilities and work ethic. Seager highlights the unique fit between Toda and a new generation of youth that enabled the Soka Gakkai to develop into a dynamic force, more specifically, the relationship between an ailing Toda and an energetic Ikeda.

=== Advocate for nuclear disarmament ===
On February 17, 1952, for example, Toda introduced his concept of "chikyu minzoku shugi," variously translated as "global nationalism" or "one-worldism." Author Olivier Urbain suggests that a modern-day equivalent would be "global citizenship," by which Toda advocated a worldview that prioritizes the interests of humanity above the interests of the state.

Addressing an assembly of 50,000 Soka Gakkai youth members on September 8, 1957, Toda issued a declaration for abolishing nuclear weapons as his will to future generations. At little more than a page of text, it was a succinct statement to the effect that there is neither victor nor humanity in any nuclear confrontation, overturning the Cold War logic of nuclear deterrence and its underlying denial that "we, the citizens of the world, have an inviolable right to live." This "Toda Declaration", proclaiming nuclear weapons to be "the ultimate evil of mankind, our numbed and remorseless readiness to deprive others of their inviolable right to live," remains the guiding principle of the Soka Gakkai peace movement.

In discussing the Russell-Einstein Manifesto with Daisaku Ikeda, Sir Joseph Rotblat characterized Toda's denunciation of nuclear arms as a "moral approach." Toda's analysis and approach toward nuclear disarmament have gained traction and form.

== Controversies ==
=== Aggressive proselytizing ===
Toda adopted an aggressive method of proselytizing, based on shakubuku (折伏), "as an 'active' way to bring the 'true faith' to all in the shortest possible time," or a method described as "to criticize and to convince". It resulted in widespread criticism in the popular press and also by other Buddhist sects. By some accounts, overenthusiastic members were responsible for excessive activities despite the cautions of Toda.

Other scholars are skeptical of the interpretation that the growth of the Soka Gakkai under Toda's leadership could be simply ascribed to forced conversion. Some point to the organization's growth as the product of Toda's organizational acumen. During the rebuilding years of 1945–50 Toda reassembled prewar members, changed the organization's name to Soka Gakkai, developed organizational infrastructure, and began laying a foundation for propagation.

Toda's programmatic approach to doctrinal teachings and organizational form as well as his keen social observations created a proselyting movement that was characterized as both militant and vigorous yet highly successful throughout the organization's rapid growth period. Toda was also effective in incorporating the powerful imagery of classical literature into his discussions and actions. For example, Toda named the young men select training group he formed the "Suiko Kai," Water Margin Club, named after the novel attributed to Shi Nai'an, one of the Four Great Classical Novels of Chinese literature, written in vernacular Chinese rather than Classical Chinese. His intention was to inspire the group of young men to aspire the group of 108 heroic outlaws depicted in the novel. He encouraged the young men in this group and the young women in the accompanying "Kaiyo Kai" group to read classical works such as Hugo's Ninety-Three, Romance of the Three Kingdoms, Caine's The Eternal City, Dumas' The Count of Monte Cristo, and Gogol's Taras Bulba. In this vein, in October 1954, Toda is said to have made a speech to over 10,000 Gakkai members while mounted on a white horse, proclaiming: "We must consider all religions our enemies, and we must destroy them."

A case in point was Ikeda's conversion through his meeting Toda in 1947. Disaffected by the imperial state's war propaganda, Ikeda was apparently impressed by the fact that Toda went to prison for his beliefs as much as Toda's reflective clarity of message in their encounter.

In 1997, Ikeda clarified that the method of propagation of Nichiren Buddhism depends upon the locality and the times, and that in dialogue with other faiths, "Our task is to bring forth the inherent goodness in people's hearts and, based on the concerns we share as human beings, work together in our own capacities for peace and happiness."

=== Relationship with Nichiren Shoshu ===
Toda's relationship with Nichiren Shoshu went through many ups and downs throughout his Soka Gakkai presidency.

==== Early relationship ====
Toda began his presidency with a determination to build closer cooperation with Nichiren Shoshu even though his appraisal of the school was at times critical. He often spoke of "bad priests" and his wartime experiences led him to conclude that his faith was stronger than that of some of the priests. On May 12, 1951, Toda requested from High Priest Nissho a special Gohonzon for attaining the organization's goal of propagation which was bestowed on May 20, 1951, and enshrined in the Soka Gakkai headquarters. On November 18, 2013, this Gohonzon was moved and enshrined at the newly constructed "Hall of the Great Vow" near the Soka Gakkai's headquarters in Tokyo; members from around the world visit and chant to this Gohonzon.

==== Tanuki incident ====
In particular Toda was extremely critical of Jimon Ogasawara, an ultranationalist priest. Providing context to the prewar situation, Montgomery explains: "During the Pacific War, most religions supported the militaristic policies of the Japanese government. While some religions did so in order to avoid political oppression, it seems that in the end most religions in Japan became permeated with the ultranationalistic spirit and supported the war effort rather voluntarily. In particular, the Nichiren tradition of Buddhism produced thinkers such as Chigaku Tanaka or Jimon Ogasawara, who, drawing on the political aspects of Nichiren's teaching, created ultranationalist ideologies legitimizing Japanese military policies of expansionism and colonization. These ideologies were then adopted by many Japanese religions. Reiyukai, which, through schismatic movements, produced many New Religions, such as Rissho Koseikai, was one of those religions which embraced Tanaka's ideology and, thus, avoided wartime oppression." Ogasawara also articulated an amalgam of Buddhism and Shinto, claiming that Buddhist deities were only manifestations of the true Shinto deities, thus placing Shinto superior to Buddhism. By supporting Ogasawara's ideology, Nichiren Shoshu managed to avoid the wartime government's goal of unifying all Nichiren groups. Toda held that Ogasawara was primarily responsible for the government repression of the Soka Kyoiku Gakkai, his and Makiguchi's imprisonment, and, ultimately, Makiguchi's death. In 1942 Ogasawara was expelled from Nichiren Shoshu.

One incident occurred in 1952 which tarnished the reputation of the young Soka Gakkai movement. On the eve of April 28, 1952, a special commemorative event was held at the head temple to honor the 700th anniversary of Nichiren's declaration of his school with 4,000 Soka Gakkai members in attendance. As it turns out, Ogasawara had been secretly readmitted to the priesthood without the knowledge of the Soka Gakkai and was present at the event. When Ogasawara's presence was discovered, a group of 47 young men, with the participation of Toda and Ikeda, confronted him and demanded an apology for his wartime actions. Holte conjectures that 47 youth were chosen to draw a parallel to the Japanese tale of the Forty-seven Ronin. During this confrontation Ogasawara kicked Toda and Toda struck him twice. Ogasawara refused to apologize for his actions during the war or recant his doctrines.

The young men then seized Ogasawara, tore off his priestly robe, and forcibly carried him to Makiguchi's grave with a placard inscribed "Tanuki Bozu" (Raccoon Monk) (Note: In Japanese folklore, the tanuki or Japanese raccoon dog is regarded as a sly and deceptive being with shapeshifting powers. The word is still used in contemporary Japanese to refer to slyness and deception. See the definition of tanuki in Kōjien (2nd ed.): 他人を欺くこと。また、そのひと。) placed on him. Under duress he signed a letter of apology at the gravesite. Ogasawara filed a complaint with the authorities against Soka Gakkai for assault and battery and later a complaint with the high priest. After Toda's apology, and with Ogasawara's lawsuit against Nissho, public sentiment turned against him and he withdrew both complaints.

Additional accounts of the incident provide more details. Brannen notes that Toda was temporarily banned from entering the temple. Shimada informs that though no legal action was taken, this incident helped establish a public view of the organization as a violent cult, a reputation which has abated over the years. The Soka Gakkai has never denied the factual events of the story but has provided its own narrative about the incident. Ikeda gives an almost 40-page explanation of the incident in The Human Revolution, his fictionalized biography of Toda.

==== Later relationship ====
The incident did not strain relationships between Toda and Nichiren Shoshu for a long time. The day following the incident, April 28, 1952, Toda published the first edition of the Complete Works of the Great Sage Nichiren (Shinpen Nichiren Daishōnin gosho zenshū), a single-volume collection of Nichiren's writings that continues to serve as the organization's primary source for its Buddhist practice. Several months later, in November 1952, Nissho, the high priest of Taiseki-ji, reprimanded Toda for the April 27th incident. Toda responded with an article entitled "Apology" printed in the Soka Gakkai's newspaper. In May 1955, Ogasawara issued a pamphlet in which he repented his indiscretion in having had the conflict with the Soka Gakkai. As time went on Nichiren Shoshu prospered as never before due to financial support from the Soka Gakkai and pilgrimages by members.

In 1952, the Soka Gakkai was legally registered as a religious organization in Japan, overcoming some initial resistance from Nichiren Shoshu clerics. At the end of that year, at the seventh Soka Gakkai general meeting, Nichijun Horigome, who was to become the 65th high priest of the order, stated, "I entrust the great propagation of the Law to the members of the Soka Gakkai."

Starting in 1954, Toda financed and donated to Nichiren Shoshu the first three of many local temples. He provided funding for the restoration of Taisekiji's Five-Storied Pagoda and the Somon Gate. In 1955, he constructed on the Taisekiji site the Hoan-den to house the Dai Gohonzon and the Grand Lecture Hall in 1958. (The latter building was demolished by Nichiren Shoshu in 1995.) On New Year's Day 1956, Nichijun made highly complimentary statements about the Soka Gakkai Toda had built.

Despite his support for Nichiren Shoshu, Toda kept a wary eye on priests. In 1951, he tells in his own hand, in an essay entitled "The History and Conviction of the Soka Gakkai," his experience before the war, his realizations during his imprisonment, his efforts to rebuild the Soka Gakkai, and his concerns for the future. In this essay he expresses praise for Nissho, the high priest at that time, but also issues strong cautions about degenerate priests.

Toda died on April 2, 1958. Nichijun, at the eighth general meeting of the Soka Gakkai held one month later, eulogized Toda stating: "It was President Toda who, as their leader, called forth those bodhisattvas; it was in the Soka Gakkai that they gathered. In other words, it was President Toda who manifested the five and seven characters of Myoho-renge-kyo as 750,000 [bodhisattvas]." Upon his death, Toda was given the title-rank of "Chief of all the preachers of the Hokkekyo" by Nichinjun, who said Toda was "considered to be the greatest among laymen."

== Death ==
Toda died on 2 April 1958, while the funeral was held at his home and the coffin was afterwards carried to the Nichiren Shōshū Jozai-ji temple in Ikebukuro, where he was buried. Prime Minister Nobusuke Kishi and the Education Minister Matsunaga (Note: See, for example, coverage in The Tablet, vol 214 (1960), p1110 snippet view) attended the Soka Gakkai funeral held in Tokyo on April 20, where 250,000 members from Japan and overseas gathered. Event news coverage asserted that although the two government officials were not members, "they bowed to some two million voters behind the altar." For two years after Toda's death, there was a leadership vacuum and the Gakkai had no president, as it was unclear if anyone was able to replace him.

== Legacy ==
After World War II, Toda transformed the Soka Gakkai into "a national phenomenon," increasing its membership exponentially and positioning it as "a grassroots social movement that championed peace and the rights of ordinary people." Although the movement was derided as one composed of "the poor and sick," Toda taught his members that such criticism was a source of pride. Toda revitalized the traditional teachings and practices of Nichiren Shoshu so they became vital for people in the modern age. Toda firmly aligned the Soka Gakkai movement with a commitment to peace in the secular world.

Toda is recognized by scholars to be the primary influence on Ikeda. In turn, Ikeda describes the impact of Toda on his life in numerous published dialogues he has conducted with leading intellects.

A number of awareness-raising initiatives by the Soka Gakkai International and its president can be traced back to Toda's 1957 call for the sake of "we, the citizens of the world" to ban both nuclear arms and the logic behind their existence. These initiatives include: the exhibit "Nuclear Arms: Threat to Our World," created in the 1980s with support from the cities of Hiroshima and Nagasaki; the campaign People's Decade for Nuclear Abolition, launched in 2007 with the exhibit "From a Culture of Violence to a Culture of Peace: Toward a World Free From Nuclear Weapons"; and the exhibit "Everything You Treasure – For a World Free From Nuclear Weapons," launched in 2012 at the 20th World Congress of the International Physicians for the Prevention of Nuclear War with support from the International Campaign to Abolish Nuclear Weapons.

Toda's call for nuclear disarmament currently takes institutional form in the Toda Institute for Global Peace and Policy Research which was founded in 1996 by Ikeda. The institute promotes peace research through the organization of conferences, the publication of books, and of the yearly journal Peace & Policy. The Toda Institute focuses on three main themes: Human Security and Human Rights, Dialogue and Nonviolent Conflict Transformation, and Global Governance and World Citizenship. It seeks concrete solutions to three main issues: Abolition of Nuclear Weapons, UN Reform, and Sustainable Peace through Environmental Integrity and Social Justice.

Toda's experiences in prison as well as his efforts to build the Soka Gakkai are chronicled in two films by Japanese film director Toshio Masuda, the 1973 film The Human Revolution (Ningen Kakumei) and a 1976 sequel, The Human Revolution II (Zoku Ningen Kakumei), both starring and produced by Toho.

Buddhist titles
Preceded by Tsunesaburō Makiguchi	2nd President of Sōka Gakkai; 3 May 1951 – 2 April 1960	Succeeded by Daisaku Ikeda
