= The Human Revolution =

Novel by Daisaku Ikeda

The Human Revolution (人間革命, Ningen Kakumei) is a roman à clef written by Daisaku Ikeda when he was the leader of the Soka Gakkai Buddhist organization. It was published between 1964 and 1995 in a newspaper belonging to the Buddhist organization, the Seikyo Shimbun. The book chronicles the life of Jōsei Toda, the second president of the Soka Gakkai, after 1945. It is considered one of Ikeda's most important works by the Soka Gakkai, and is regarded as a fictionalized retelling by some scholars.

== Background ==
In The Human Revolution, a narrator named Shin'ichi Yamamoto tells the story of the Soka Gakkai between 1945 and the beginning of the 1960s.

The book is inspired by epic novels, like Romance of the Three Kingdoms, and the style of French Romantics, like Victor Hugo or Romain Rolland.

The novel was self-published by the Soka Gakkai and printed in 30 volumes. It has sold millions of copies to Soka Gakkai's members, and has been translated into several other languages.

Although Soka Gakkai teaches its members that the work is its "correct history", it is a semi-fictionalized treatment of it.and tends to substitute for the facts and the way in which historians recount the same era, explains scholar Levi McLaughlin.

It is also used as a rite of passage, recruits have to read it entirely and "''produce evidence of results (seiseki), either by converting one household to Soka Gakkai or securing one new subscription to Seikyō shinbun (...) The Gakkai thus regards mastery of the organization’s history, represented as Ikeda’s literary biography, as the true test of faithful adherence''."It is also used as a rite of passage: recruits have to read it entirely and "produce evidence of results (seiseki), either by converting one household to Soka Gakkai or securing one new subscription to Seikyō shinbun ... The Gakkai thus regards mastery of the organization's history, represented as Ikeda's literary biography, as the true test of faithful adherence."

== Related works ==
The Human Revolution inspired two movies directed by Toshio Masuda.

Ikeda followed The Human Revolution with another series of books titled The New Human Revolution. These volumes began with Ikeda's trip to organize the Soka Gakkai in the United States and Brazil in 1960, several months after he succeeded Toda as president. The New Human Revolution, completed on August 6, 2018 by Ikeda at the age of 90, also consists of 30 volumes.

== Selected works ==
- The Human Revolution (The Human Revolution, #1–12), abridged two-book set, Santa Monica, California: World Tribune Press, 2008; ISBN 0-915678-77-2
- The Human Revolution (The Human Revolution, #1–6 with foreword by Arnold Toynbee), Weatherhill, Inc. edition, publishing years 1972–1999.
- The New Human Revolution (30 volumes), Santa Monica, California: World Tribune Press, 1995–.

== Film adaptations ==
- Ningen Kakumei (The Human Revolution), a 1973 Tōhō production, starring Tetsurō Tamba and directed by Toshio Masuda. It grossed ¥1,193,200,000 at the Japanese box office.
- Zoku Ningen Kakumei (The Human Revolution Continues), a 1976 Tōhō production, starring Tetsurō Tamba and directed by Toshio Masuda. It grossed ¥1,607,000,000 at the Japanese box office.
