= Tsunesaburō Makiguchi =

Educator and founding president of Soka Gakkai

- 牧口常三郎
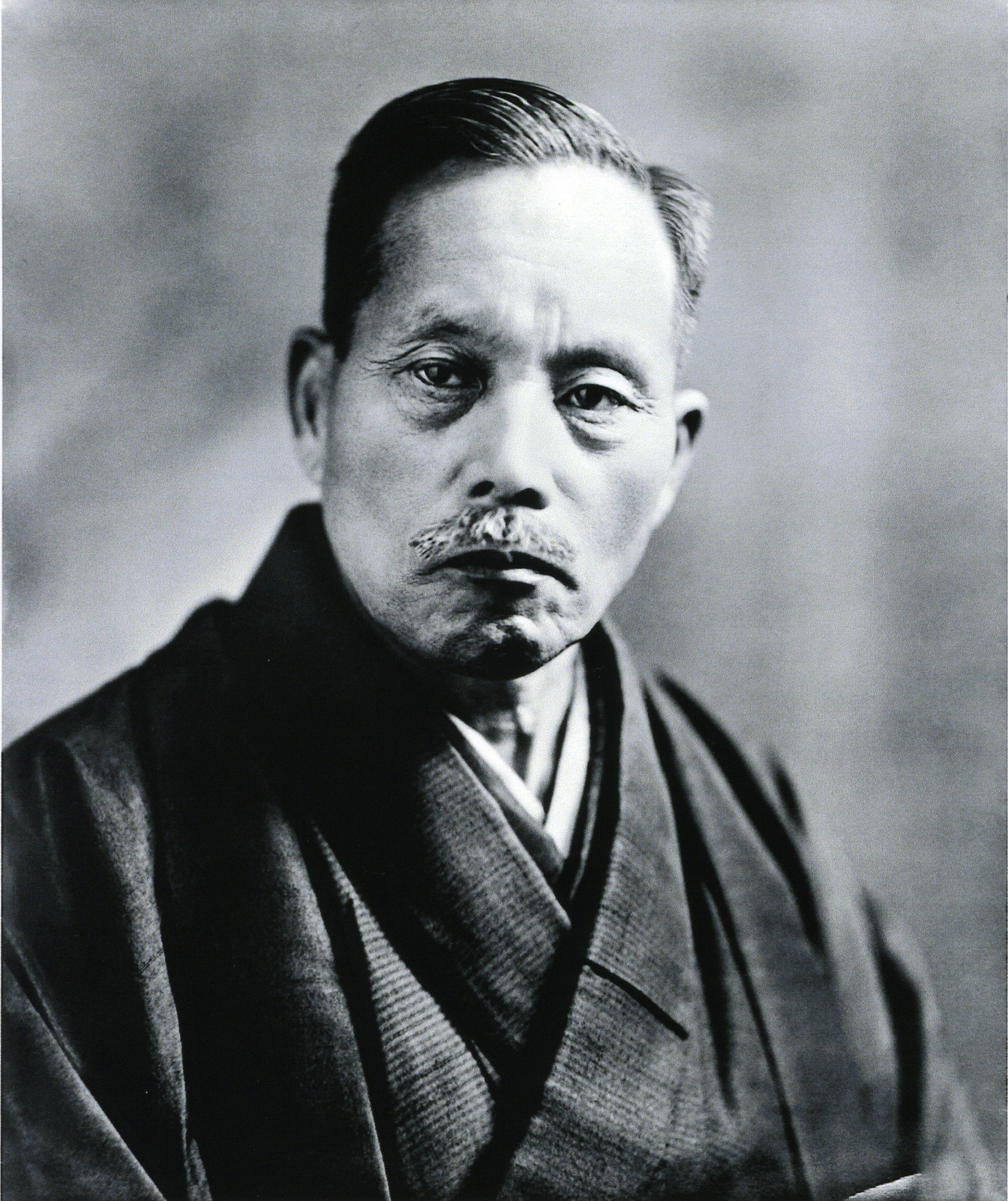

1st President of Sōka Kyōiku Gakkai
- In office 18 November 1930 – 18 November 1944
- Succeeded by: Jōsei Toda

Personal details
- Born: 23 July 1871 (Note: Lunar calendar date 6 June) Kashiwazaki, Niigata Prefecture, Japan
- Died: 18 November 1944 (aged 73) Sugamo Prison, Toshima, Tokyo, Japan
- Resting place: Taiseki-ji
- Education: Sapporo Normal School (present-day Hokkaido University of Education)

Tsunesaburō Makiguchi (牧口 常三郎, Makiguchi Tsunesaburō; 23 July 1871–18 November 1944) was a Japanese educator who founded and became the first president of the Sōka Kyōiku Gakkai (Value-Creating Education Society), the predecessor of today's Soka Gakkai.

== Early life and career ==
Makiguchi was born in the small village Arahama of Kashiwazaki, Niigata Prefecture, Japan, on 23 July 1871 (lunar calendar date 6 June). After his father abandoned the family and his mother attempted to kill both herself and Makiguchi by drowning, he was adopted by an uncle, Makiguchi Zendayu. About age 14 he moved to Hokkaido to live with another uncle, Watanabe Shiroji. Working his way through school, he graduated from Sapporo Normal School (today's Hokkaido University of Education) in 1893. First employed as an assistant teacher at a primary school affiliated with his alma mater, he later taught high school and served as a dormitory superintendent.

Makiguchi's novel approach to geography appears in his book Jinsei Chirigaku (A Geography of Human Life) published in 1903 when he was 32. In this work, Makiguchi rejects the prevailing approach to the study of geography, based on the rote memorization of facts and place names, instead advocating a rational understanding of geography based on the relationship of the individual, human activity and industrial advancement to nature.

Although recognized as an able teacher, Makiguchi's uncompromising attitude toward authorities created problems. His clashes with officials of the Ministry of Education, school inspectors, ward assemblymen, city councilmen, and top officials of the city of Tokyo were frequent and resulted in frequent transfers between schools. After moving to Tokyo, he served as principal in a succession of six primary schools, from 1913 to 1932, the end of his career.

During those years, he devoted much consideration to the relationship between life and education, developing his theories on sōka or the creation of value, the happiness of the individual, the prosperity of society at large, and their interrelationships in practice. In June 1928, Makiguchi became a religious convert and practitioner of Nichiren Shoshu Buddhism, having been introduced by Tokyo business high school principal Sokei Mitani. His close friend and disciple Jōsei Toda followed his Buddhist conversion in 1930.

== Educational reformer ==
Makiguchi's aforementioned work Jinsei Chirigaku (A Geography of Human Life), predates the academic study of geography at the Imperial Universities of Kyoto and Tokyo in 1907 and 1911, respectively, and pioneered a new approach to teaching geography in Japan. Written between the First Sino-Japanese War and the Russo-Japanese War, the work presents human geography as a subject for both formal and nonformal learning to advance an understanding of cultural differences shaping and shaped by the relationship between human activity and its natural environment. While "Japanese geographers of the time were chiefly concerned with describing the physical features of the earth," Makiguchi was arguably the first to discuss human geography as a system of knowledge correlating location theory and spatial distribution of human phenomena with economic, social and political geographies. In Makiguchi's words, "it is through our spiritual interaction with the earth that the characteristics that we think of as human are ignited and nurtured within us." In this work, Makiguchi also formulated the concept of humanitarian competition as an approach to international relations, writing that: "The important thing is the setting of a goal of well being and protection of all people, including oneself but not at the increase of self-interest alone. In other words, the aim is the betterment of others and in doing so, one chooses ways that will yield personal benefit as well as benefits to others. It is a conscious effort to create a more harmonious community life."

In response to problems throughout the education system that resulted from the Meiji government's adoption of the Imperial Rescript, Makiguchi published the first volume of Sōka Kyōikugaku Taikei (The System of Value-Creation Pedagogy) together with his close friend and disciple Jōsei Toda on 18 November 1930. The date was later adopted as the Founding Day of Sōka Gakkai. The four-volume work, published over a period of five years, sets forth his thoughts on education and proposals for systemic reform. Rather than education serving the state, as embodied in the Imperial Rescript on Education, Makiguchi proposed a student-centered education with the purpose of ensuring the happiness of the learner.

He also proposed the creation of an educational system comprising a partnership of school, home and community. In this system, a child would spend half a day in school and the other half in apprenticeships and other types of work activities at home and in the community befitting the nature and needs of the child. Makiguchi felt that implementing such a system would change bored, apathetic learners into eager, self-directed students.

=== Theory of value, value-creation and happiness ===
He distinguished value as that which emerges or is created from the relationship or interaction between self and object; truth, not a value but an object whose existence cannot be created but revealed or discovered; the value of beauty, a measure of sensory impact on aesthetic awareness; the value of gain, a measure of holistic advancement in life; and the value of good, a measure of contribution to social or public well-being. For Makiguchi, value is determined by "whether something adds to or detracts from, advances or hinders, the human condition."

Makiguchi's theory of value emphasizes a "participatory inter-connectedness of individuals through community engagement" that meaningfully enhances the well-being of both the individual and society through the transformational process of pursuing value creation. "Human life is a process of creating value," Makiguchi wrote, "and education should guide us towards that end. Thus, educational practices should serve to promote value creation."

== Founder of Sōka Kyōiku Gakkai ==
The publisher of Makiguchi's Sōka Kyōikugaku Taikei, volume one, on 18 November 1930 was Sōka Kyōiku Gakkai (創 価 教 育 学 会; English: Value-Creation Education Society), a society of reform-minded educators and teachers that over the course of the 1930s grew more inclusive of broader social reform and became today's Soka Gakkai organization.

His gradual shift in focus from educational to religious means of social reform may be traced to several factors, including the personal tragedies of the deaths of four of his children and the increasing military dominance in every facet of society, in tandem with his embrace of Nichiren's philosophy.

In Nichiren's teachings Makiguchi had found support for his theory of value-creation and a world view consistent with his aims of educational reform and social betterment centered on addressing the subjective realities of the individual.

According to Brian Victoria, Makiguchi had an "absolute faith in Nichiren and his teachings [...]. Faith in any other religious teaching was, by definition, an evil practice that had to be eradicated. In other words, despite postwar SGI claims to the contrary, Makiguchi had no sympathy for 'freedom of religion' for anyone other than himself and those who strictly adhered to his sectarian viewpoint." However, Stone and Sumimoto argue that notions of "tolerance" or "intolerance" should be seen from the perspective of Japanese historical and cultural context.

== Wartime arrest ==
During World War II, Makiguchi opposed Japan's military government's attempts to impose the doctrine of State Shinto through strict control of religions and thoughts inimical to its war effort.

In 1943, due to his refusal to accept the Shinto talisman as a symbol of acquiescence to the state doctrine and support the war, he was arrested and imprisoned as a "thought criminal" together with Jōsei Toda and 20 senior leaders of Sōka Kyōiku Gakkai for violating the Peace Preservation Law revised in 1941 and under which tens of thousands were arrested. Already in his seventies, Makiguchi was subjected to harsh interrogation as the authorities sought to force him to recant his beliefs. On 18 November 1944, Makiguchi died in prison of malnutrition. His cremated ashes were buried in a Buddhist Stupa in Taisekiji Temple (Shizuoka Prefecture).

There was some debate as to whether Makiguchi's actions can be considered as an opposition to the war,. The Soka Gakkai considers that "his outspoken criticism of the prevailing belief system represents an implicit and explicit protest against an extreme abuse of the educational process for militarist purposes." But historian and buddhist monk Brian Victoria states that Makiguchi cannot be considered as a political or religious dissident. In a 2014 study of Makiguchi's writings, Brian Victoria considers that Makiguchi was defending his own Nichiren buddhism belief, but was not the anti-war zealot described by the Soka Gakkai today.

== Legacy ==
Daisaku Ikeda established a secular worldwide network of Soka schools based on Makiguchi's pedagogy, including several independent secondary schools and two universities: Sōka University of Japan and Soka University of America. "The fairly recent growth in the internationalization of Soka education", writes Paul Sherman, specialist in global citizenship education in higher education, "is a reflection of Makiguchi's ideas on the important function of education in human development, in that he believed a key purpose of education was to cultivate global-minded individuals who could be empathetically engaged with the world, while at the same time maintain their roots at the local community level."

Makiguchi was obscure in Japanese scholarship of the 1930s. His Sōka Kyōikugaku Taikei has been translated into English, Portuguese, French and Vietnamese. In Brazil, Makiguchi's theory of education based on value-creation has been sponsored in 55 schools and introduced in 1,103 classrooms to more than 34,000 students.

== In film ==
The 1973 film Ningen kakumei (The Human Revolution), directed by Toshio Masuda, dramatizes the educational career of Makiguchi, his relationship with Josei Toda, and his WWII imprisonment for his beliefs during which he died.

== Books ==
- Education for Creative Living: Ideas and Proposals of Tsunesaburo Makiguchi, Iowa State University Press, 1989; ISBN 978-0813803920
- Makiguchi the Value Creator: Revolutionary Japanese Educator and Founder of Soka Gakkai, Weatherhill, 1994; ISBN 978-0834803183
- A Geography of Human Life, Caddo Gap Pr, 2002; ISBN 978-1880192429
- Makiguchi and Gandhi: Their Education Relevance for the 21st Century, UPS, 2008; ISBN 978-0761840688
- Soka Education: For the Happiness of the Individual, Middleway Press, 2010; ISBN 978-0977924554
- Tsunesaburo Makiguchi (1871-1944): Educational Philosophy in Context, Routledge, 2013; ISBN 978-0415718776
- Philosophy of Value by Tsunesaburo Makiguchi, translated by Translation Division Overseas Bureau. Seikyo Press, Tokyo, 1964.

== Notes ==
Buddhist titles
| Preceded by new office | 1st President of Sōka Kyōiku Gakkai; 18 November 1930 – 18 November 1944 | Succeeded by Jōsei Toda |
