= Seikyo Shimbun =

- Front page of Seikyo Shimbun on 14 November 2026
- Type: Daily newspaper
- Owner: Soka Gakkai
- Founded: 20 April 1951
- Country: Japan
- Website: www.seikyoonline.com

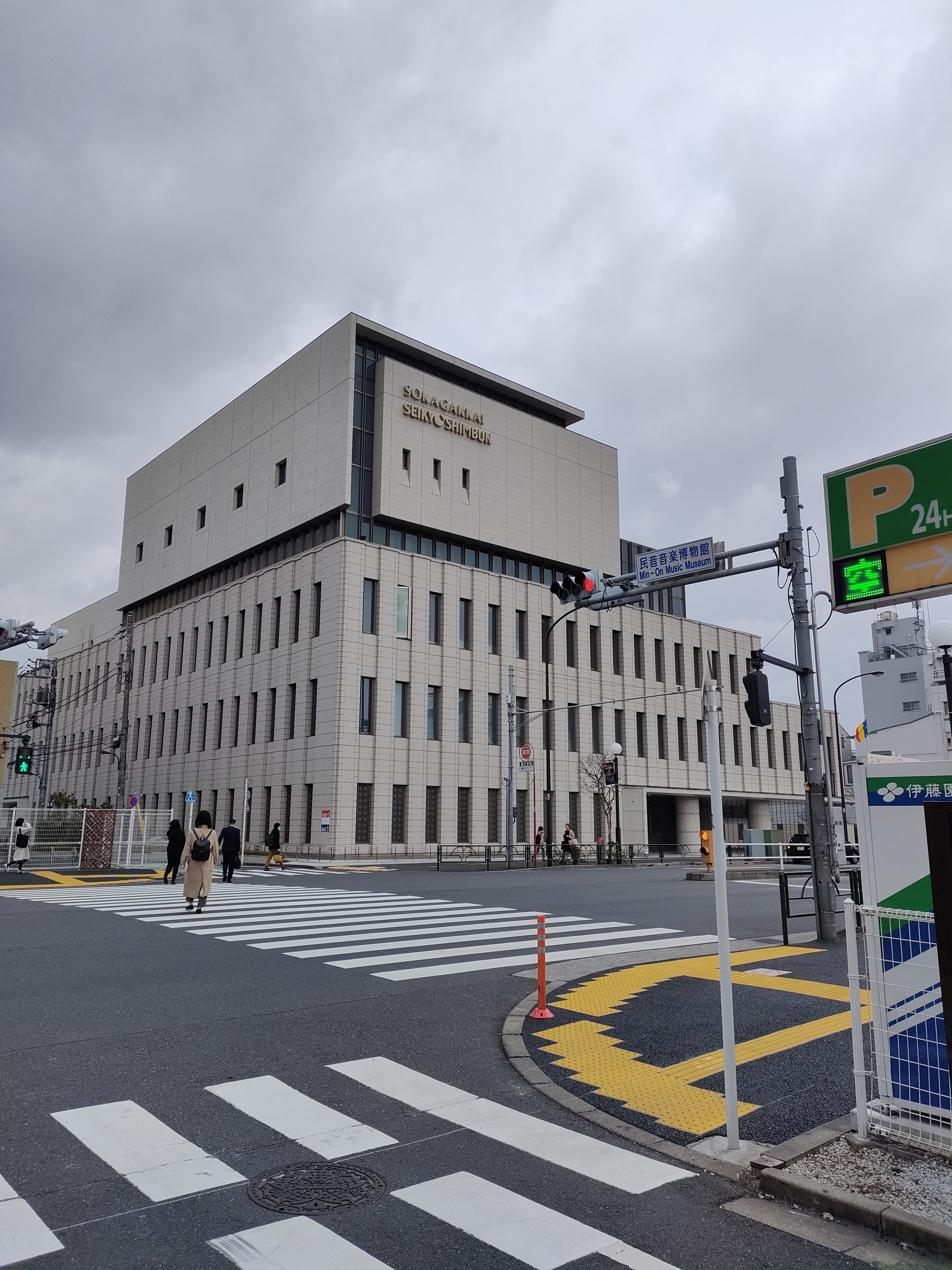
The Seikyo Shimbun headquarters in Shinanomachi, Shinjuku, Tokyo

The Seikyo Shimbun (聖教新聞, Seikyō Shimbun) (English: "the newspaper of sacred teachings") is a Japanese newspaper. It is owned by the Japanese Buddhist religious movement Soka Gakkai. In 1997, it claimed a 5,5 million circulation, but the number is controversial and impossible to verify.

== Background ==
The Seikyo Shimbun was first published on 20 April 1951.

The publication is owned and operated by the Japanese Buddhist organization Soka Gakkai.

It is not considered as a regular newspaper and usually does not provide current news.

It mainly features news articles about the activities of the former president of the Soka Gakkai International (SGI), Daisaku Ikeda, and essays written by him, as well as news and experiences by Soka Gakkai members in Japan and abroad.

The Seikyo Shimbun is delivered throughout Japan by volunteer deliverers to its subscribers. It is not sold in public shops.

Unlike the other daily newspapers in Japan, the Seikyo Shinbun is not a member of the Japan Newspaper Publishers and Editors Association nor the Japan Audit Bureau of Circulations who are officially in charge of the circulation numbers of Japanese newspapers.

== History ==
- 1951 April 20 - First issue of the Seikyo Shimbun is published. The paper has a two-page format and is published every 10 days with nominally a circulation of 5,000.
- 1965 July 15 - The Seikyo Shimbun becomes a daily paper.
- 1971 January 4 - Adopts a 12-page format (which remains the same as of 2016).
- 1990 July 19 - 10,000th issue published.
- 2006 November 18 - Official website of the Seikyo Shimbun, Seikyo Online is launched.
- 2008 July 15 – Front-page articles began to be printed in color on a daily basis.
- 2010 April 20 – The official website Seikyo Online was redesigned.
- 2011 April 20 – 60th anniversary of the newspaper's founding.
- 2011 November 3 – The serialized novel The New Human Revolution reached its 4,726th installment, surpassing Sōhachi Yamaoka's Tokugawa Ieyasu (4,725 installments, including extra stories), setting a new record for the longest newspaper novel serialization in Japan.
- 2014 May 8 – The newspaper's title and layout was completely redesigned.
- 2015 July 15 – 50th anniversary of daily publication.
- 2016 February 1 – The official website Seikyo Online was redesigned again, with some content becoming subscription-based.
- 2017 February 18 – The serialization of The New Human Revolution surpassed 6,000 installments.
- 2018 September 8 – The New Human Revolution was completed.
- 2019 January 20 – The newspaper reached its 20,000th issue.
- 2019 November 12 – Seikyo Online was completely revamped and rebranded as Seikyo Digital Edition.
- 2019 November 18 – The Soka Gakkai World Seikyo Center was completed in the Soka Gakkai Headquarters area in Shinanomachi, Tokyo, on the site of the former TEPCO Hospital. Business operations were relocated.

== See also ==
- Self-publishing
