= Doi, Ehime (village) =

Dissolved municipality in Ehime prefecture, Japan

Doi (土居村, Doi-mura) was a village located in Uma District, Ehime Prefecture. On March 31, 1954, the village merged with other villages to become the town of Doi. Currently part of the city of Shikokuchūō.

== History ==
- December 15, 1889 - Due to the municipal status enforcement, the villages of Doi, Urayama, Irino, and Hatano merged to form the village of Doi, Uma District.
- March 31, 1954 - Merged with the villages of Nagatsu, Kofuji, Tenma, Kaburasaki, and Sekigawa to become the town of Doi.
- April 1, 2004 - The town of Doi merged with the village of Shingū and the cities of Kawanoe and Iyomishima to become the city of Shikokuchūō.

== See also ==
- List of dissolved municipalities of Japan
