= Toshiyuki Kato =

Japanese politician

- 加藤 敏幸
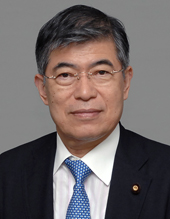
- Official portrait, 2011

Member of the House of Councillors
- In office 26 July 2004 – 25 July 2016
- Constituency: National PR

Personal details
- Born: 16 February 1949 (age 77) Niihama, Ehime, Japan
- Party: Democratic
- Education: Niihama National College of Technology

Toshiyuki Kato (加藤 敏幸, Katō Toshiyuki; born February 16, 1949) is a Japanese politician of the Democratic Party of Japan, a member of the House of Councillors in the Diet (national legislature). A native of Niihama, Ehime and high school graduate, he was elected for the first time in 2004.
