= Futana, Ehime =

Futana, Ehime

- Futana, Ehime (Uma District) - Village of Futana(二名村), Uma District, Ehime Prefecture (now the city of Shikokuchūō)
- Futana, Ehime (Kitauwa District) - Village of Futana(二名村), Kitauwa District, Ehime Prefecture (now the city of Uwajima)
