= Pindapata =

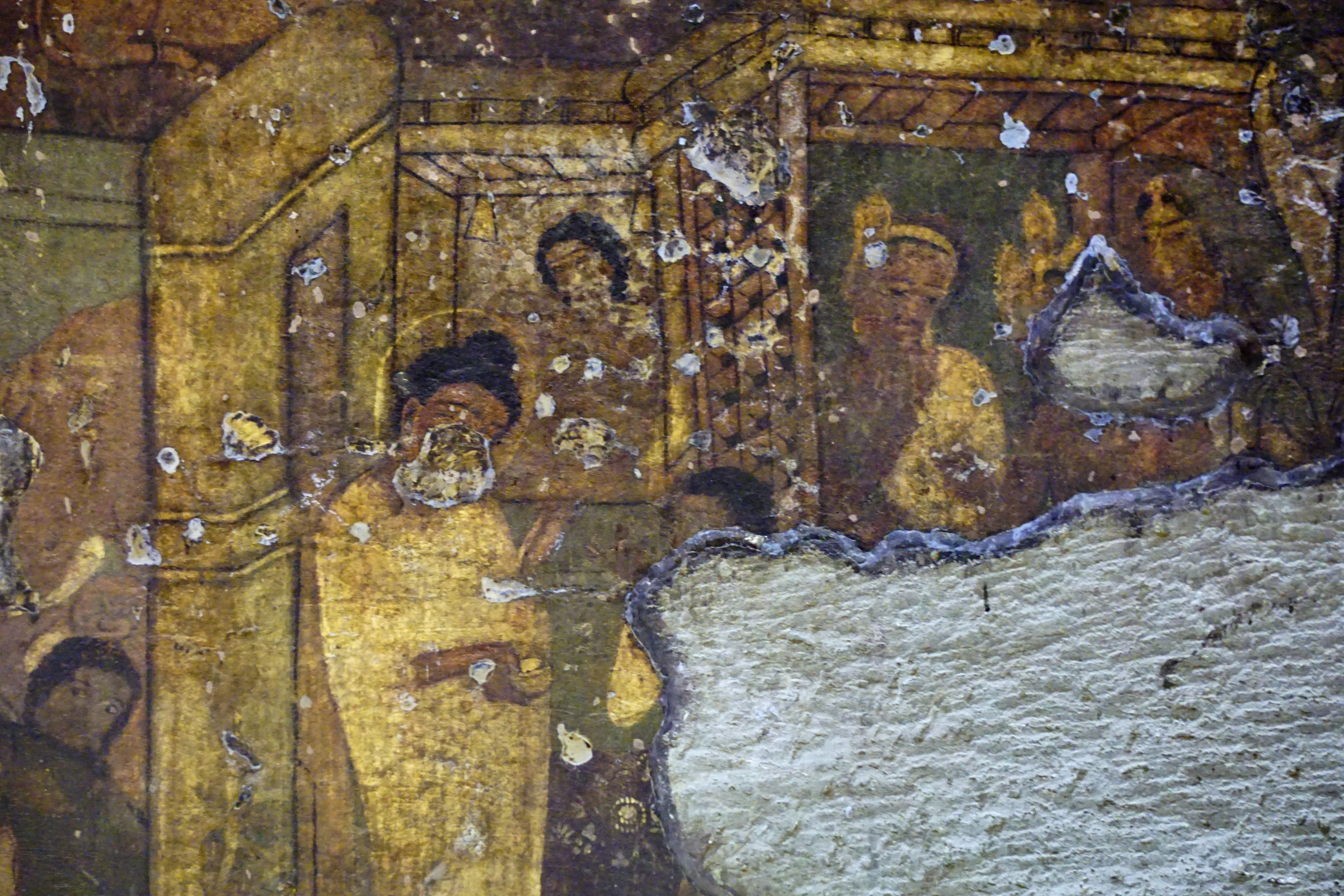
Mural depicting the Buddha on almsround, from the Ajanta Caves

Piṇḍapāta or piṇḍacāra is a Pali term used to refer to the Buddhist monastic practice of almsround to the laity to receive almsfood and other necessities.

In Japanese Buddhism, this practice is also known as takuhatsu (托鉢).

== Theravāda ==
In Theravāda Buddhism, the practice is referred to by the Pāli term piṇḍacāra (𑀧𑀺𑀡𑁆𑀟𑀘𑀸𑀭). Monks or nuns on piṇḍacāra go around town on foot with their almsbowl under their outer robe and make themselves available to the laity to receive almsfood (𑀧𑀺𑀡𑁆𑀟𑀧𑀸𑀢, piṇḍapāta).

Owing, however, to the precarity inherent in almost all aspects of Theravāda monastic life, there is no guarantee of collecting enough food for the day, if any at all. This precarity is particularly observable outside the Indosphere, or even within it in times of societal or systemic crisis.

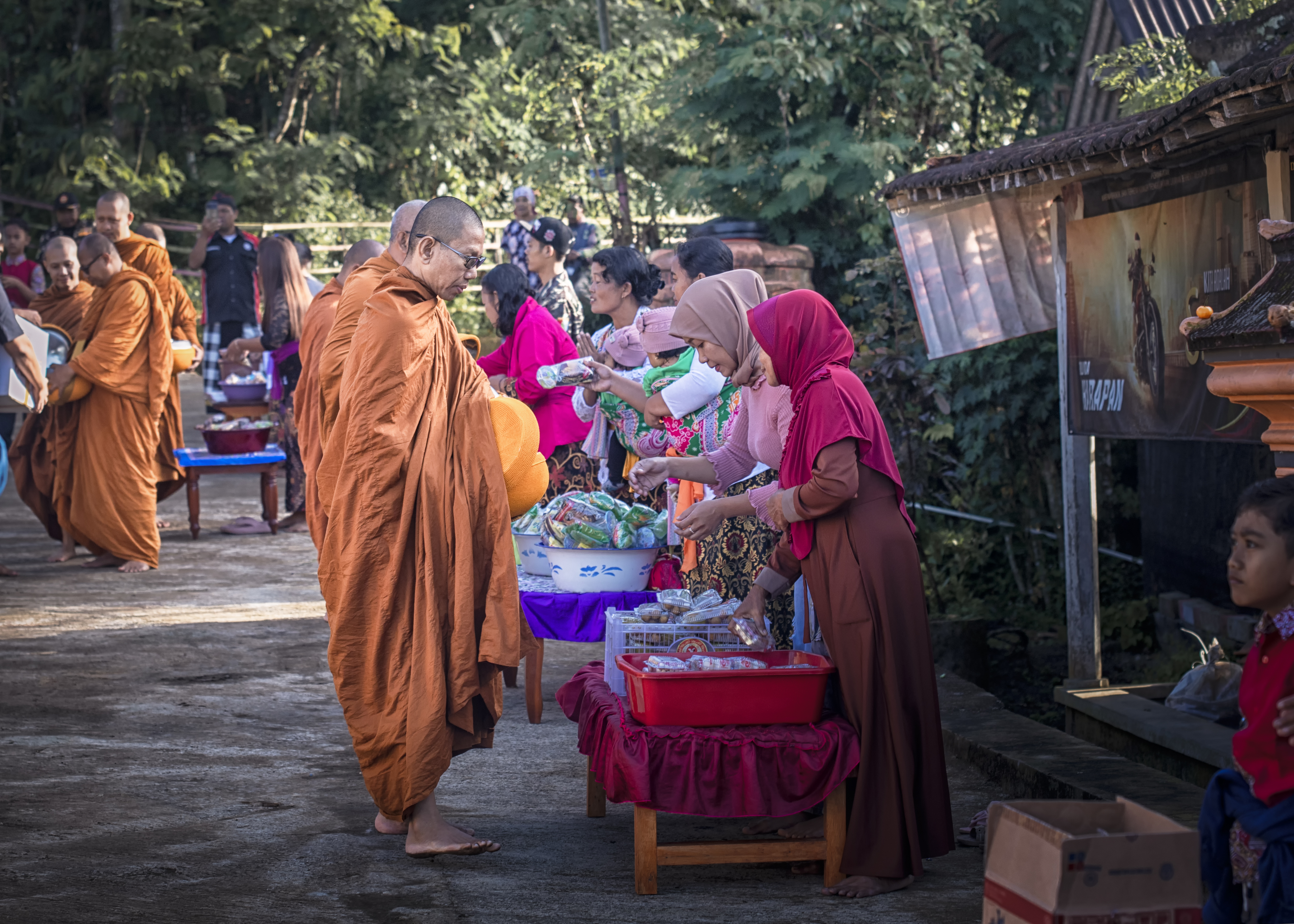
Pindapata around Bodhigiri Vihāra, Balerejo, Wlingi, Blitar, East Java, Indonesia

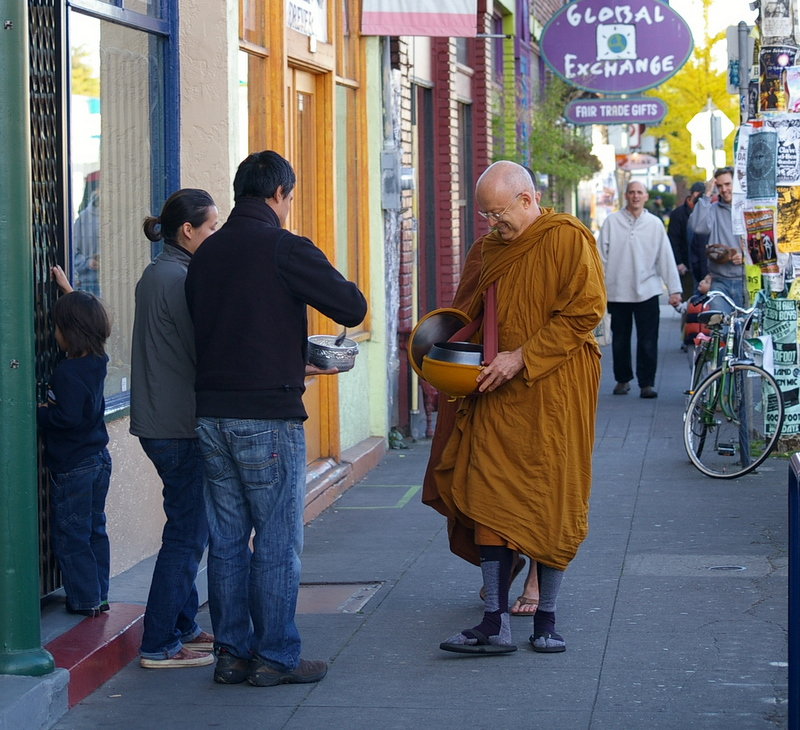
Ṭhānissaro, an American monk, practicing piṇḍacāra by receiving piṇḍapāta in Portland, Oregon, United States

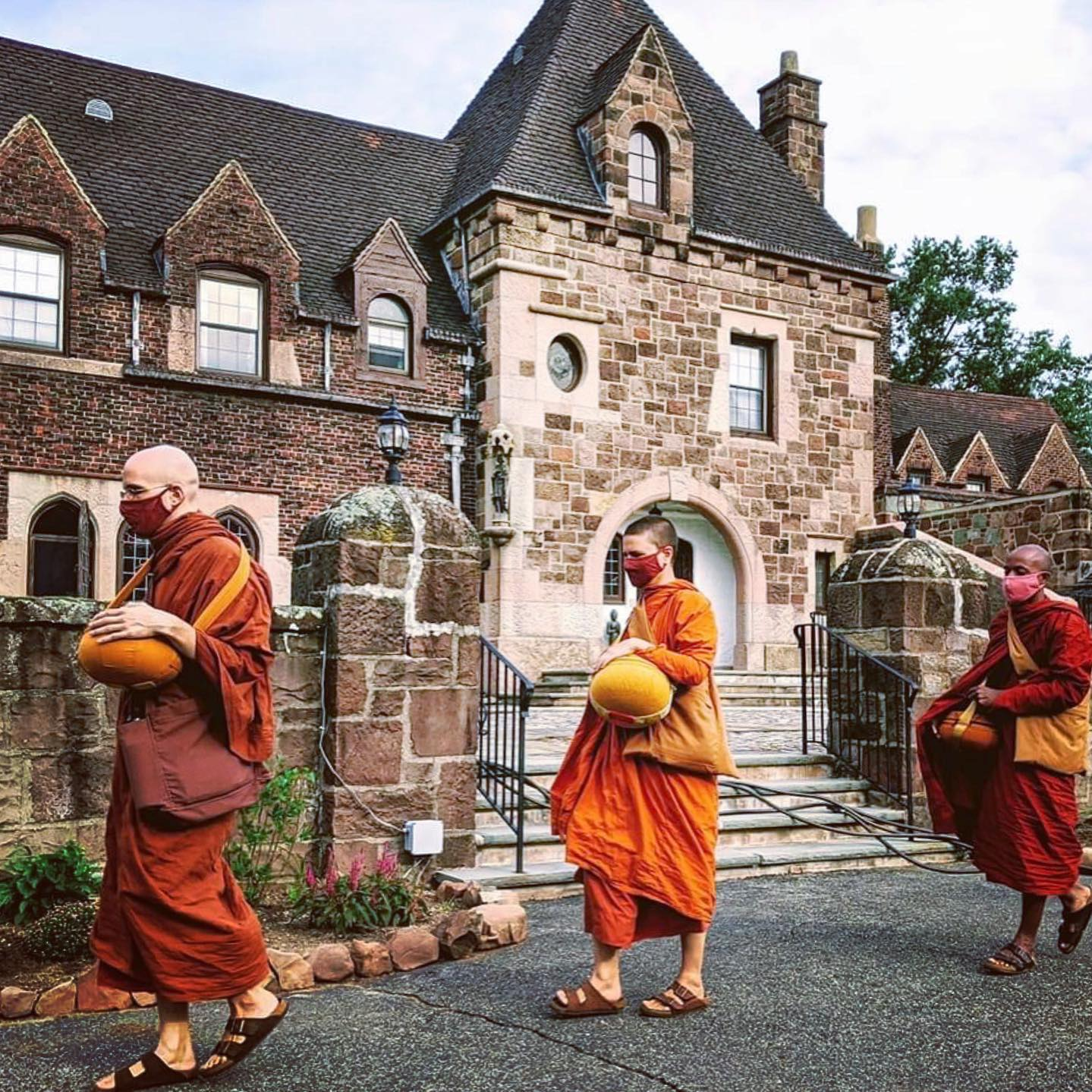
Monks and nuns of Empty Cloud Monastery on piṇḍapāta in West Orange, New Jersey, United States

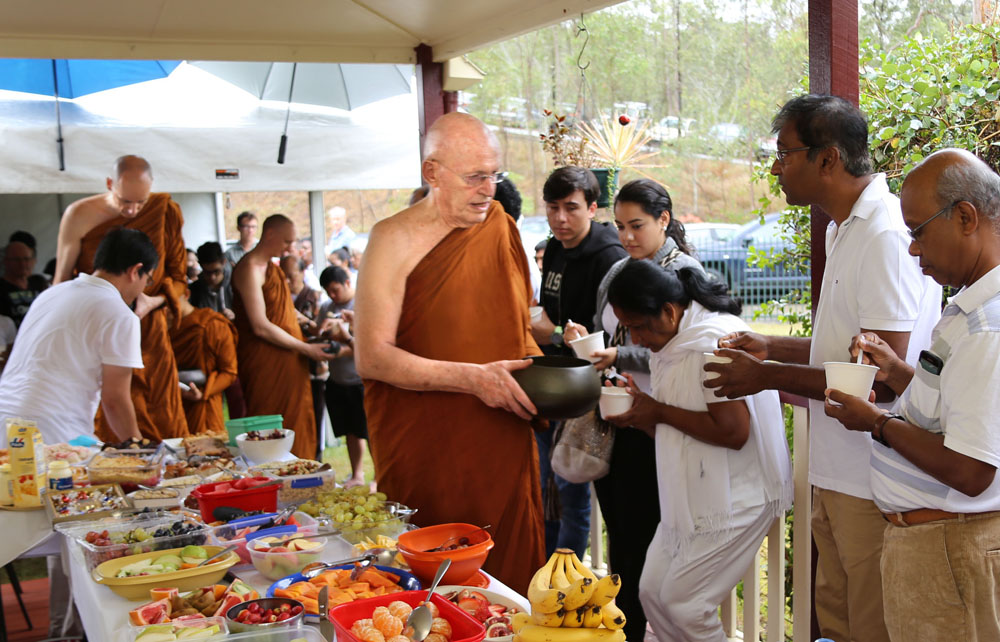
Piṇḍapāta at Dhammagiri Forest Hermitage, Brisbane, Australia

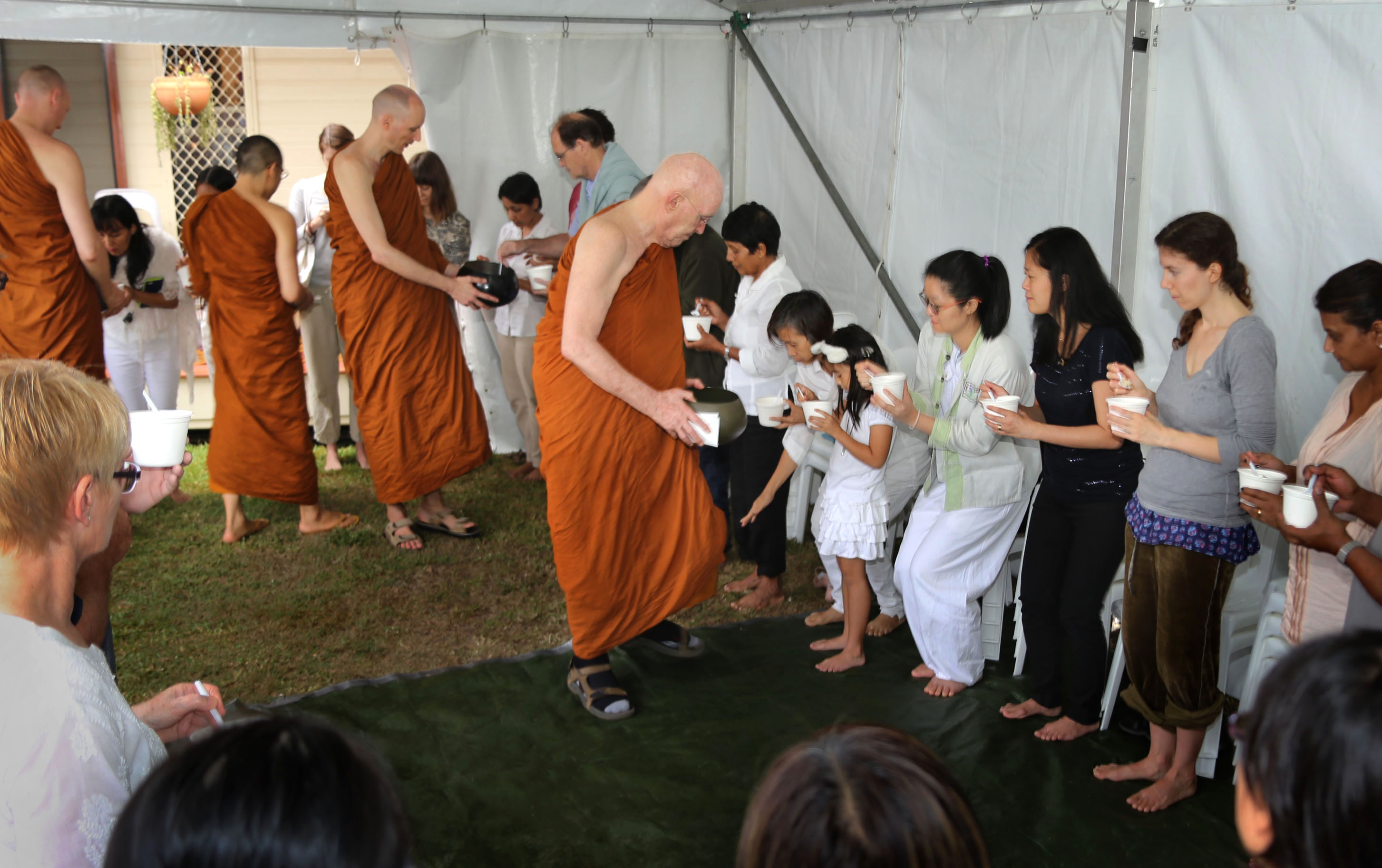
Piṇḍapāta at Dhammagiri Forest Hermitage, Brisbane, Australia

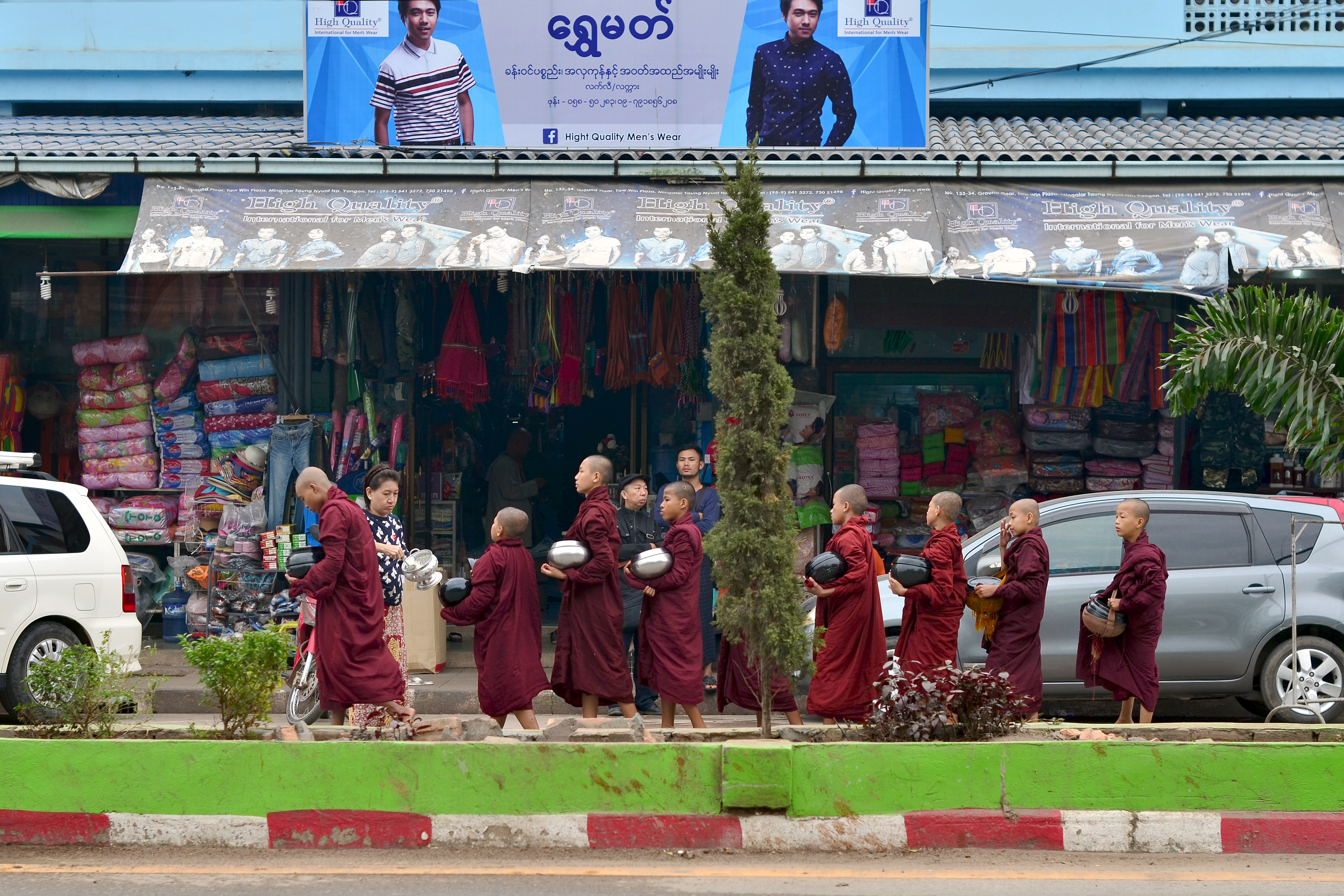
Piṇḍapāta in Myanmar

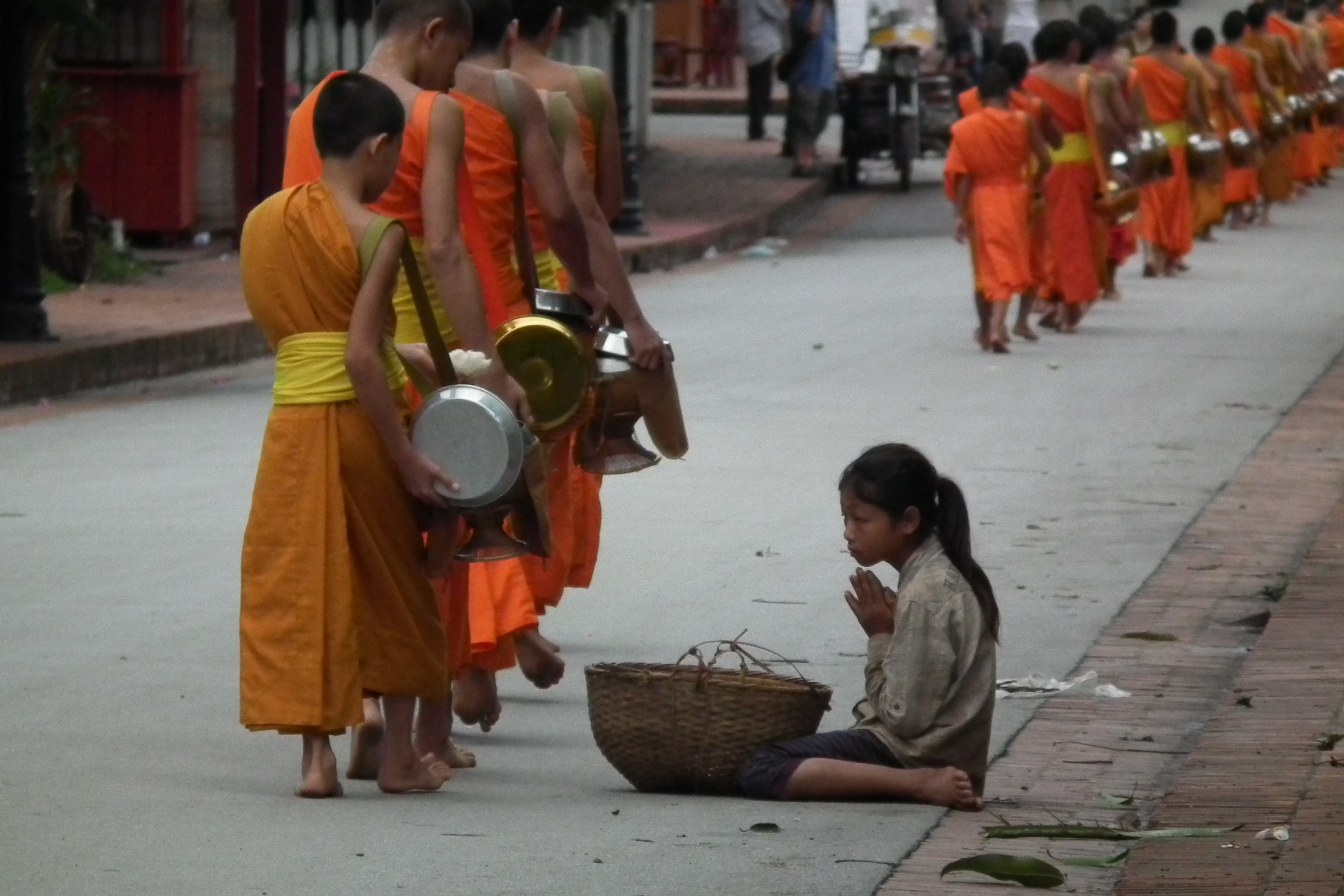
Piṇḍapāta in Luang Prabang, Laos

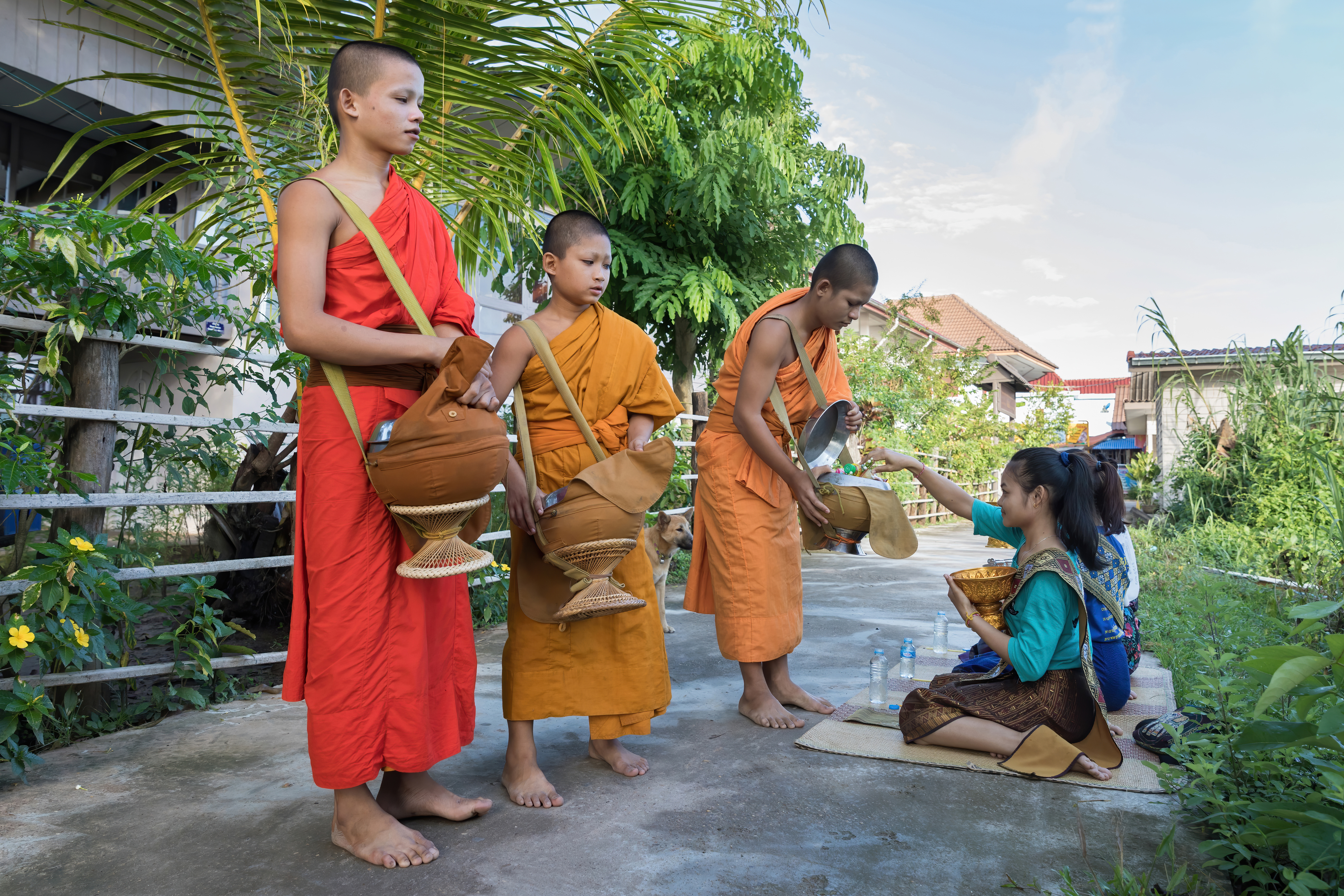
Piṇḍapāta in Si Phan Don, Laos

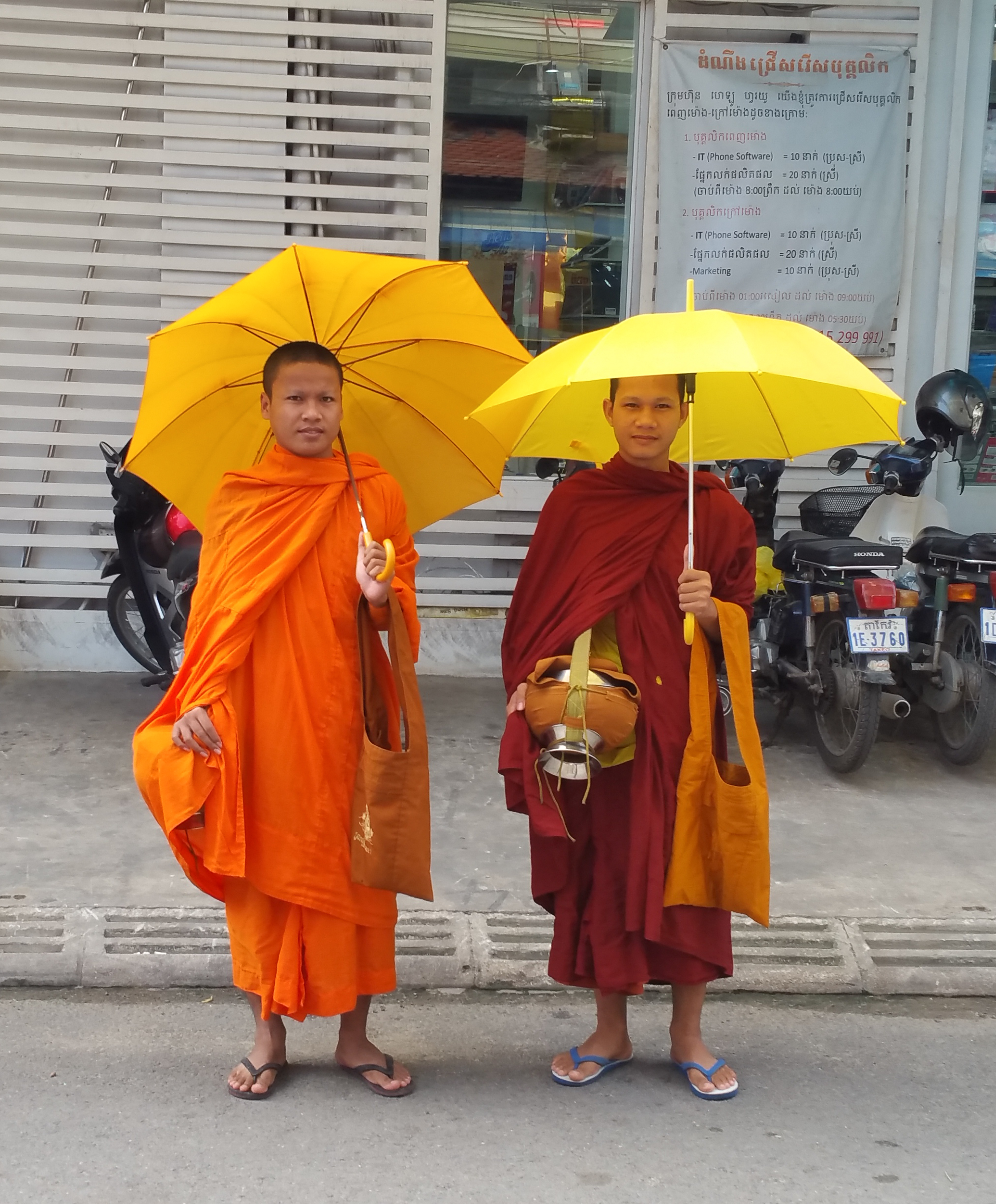
Two monks performing piṇḍapāta on Street 172, Phnom Penh, Cambodia

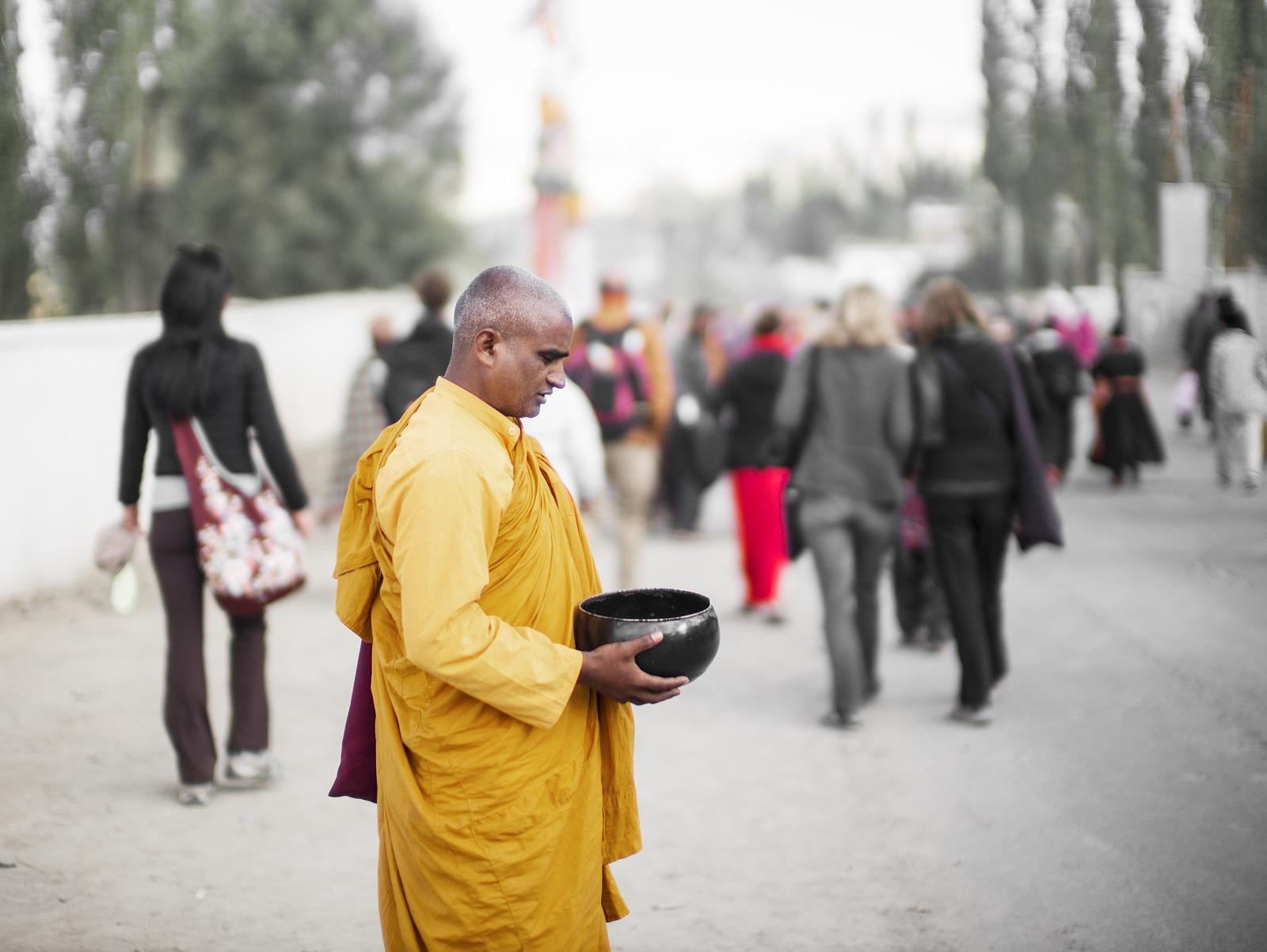
Piṇḍapāta in Ladakh, India

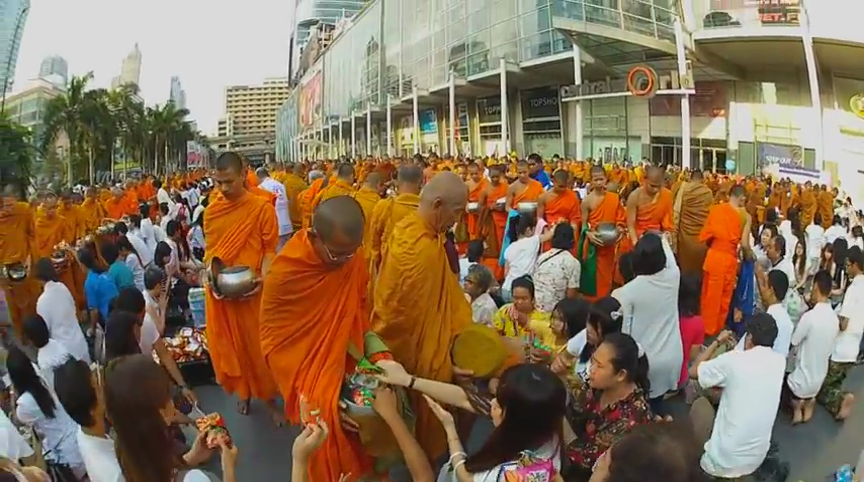
Piṇḍapāta next to CentralWorld, Bangkok, Thailand

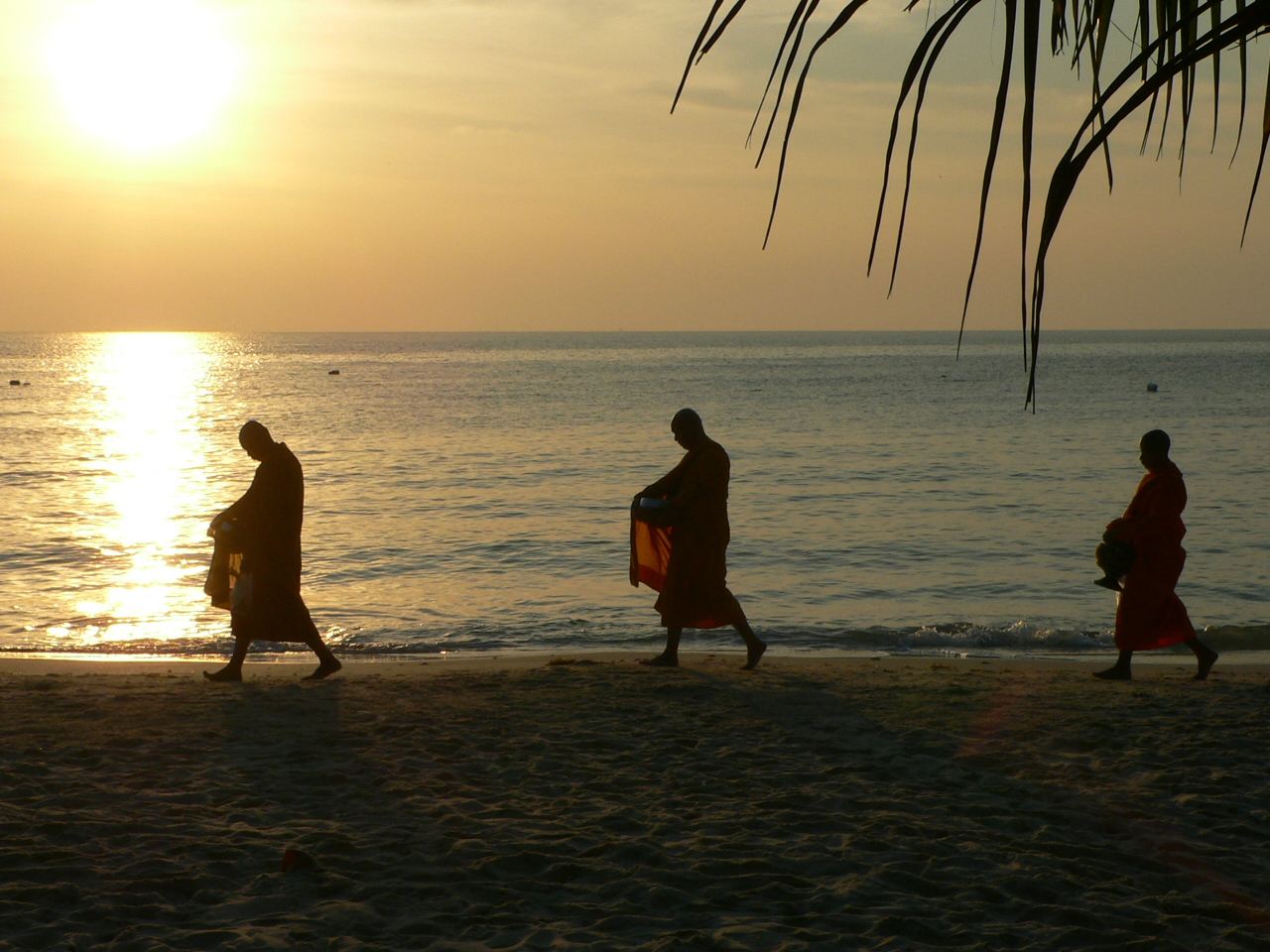
Piṇḍapāta on a small island in Thailand

== Mahāyāna ==
In the practice of takuhatsu, monks travel to various businesses and residences to chant sutras in Sino-Japanese (thus generating merit) in exchange for donations of food and money.

Monks generally wear traditional takuhatsu clothes reminiscent of medieval Japanese garb and wear the names of their monasteries on their satchels to confirm their identities. This system is used by Zen monks in training to beg for their food, and is generally done in groups of ten to fifteen. The group walks through a street in single-file, chanting Hō (法; dharma), and the faithful gather to fill their alms bowls. This is the monks' offering of the Dharma and their lives of guardians of the Dharma to the people. According to Zen tradition, the givers should be grateful.

A Japanese monk practicing takuhatsu on a Tokyo street, 2013

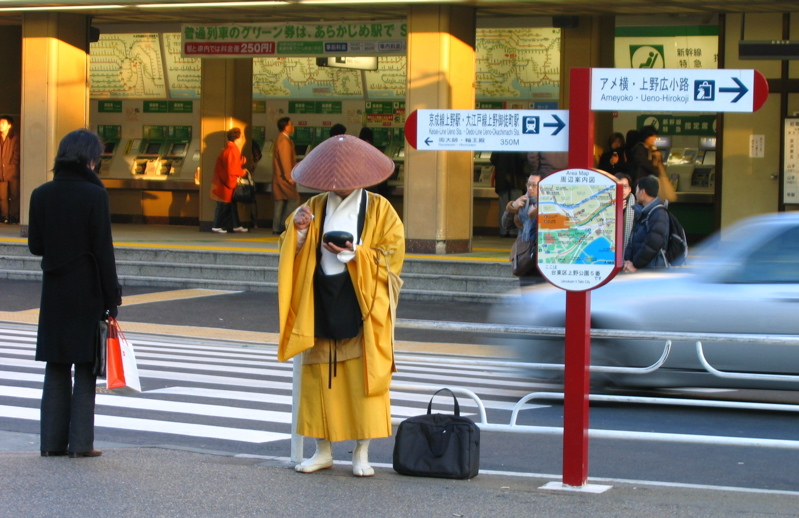
Takuhatsu practice in Tsutsujigaoka, Chofu, Tokyo

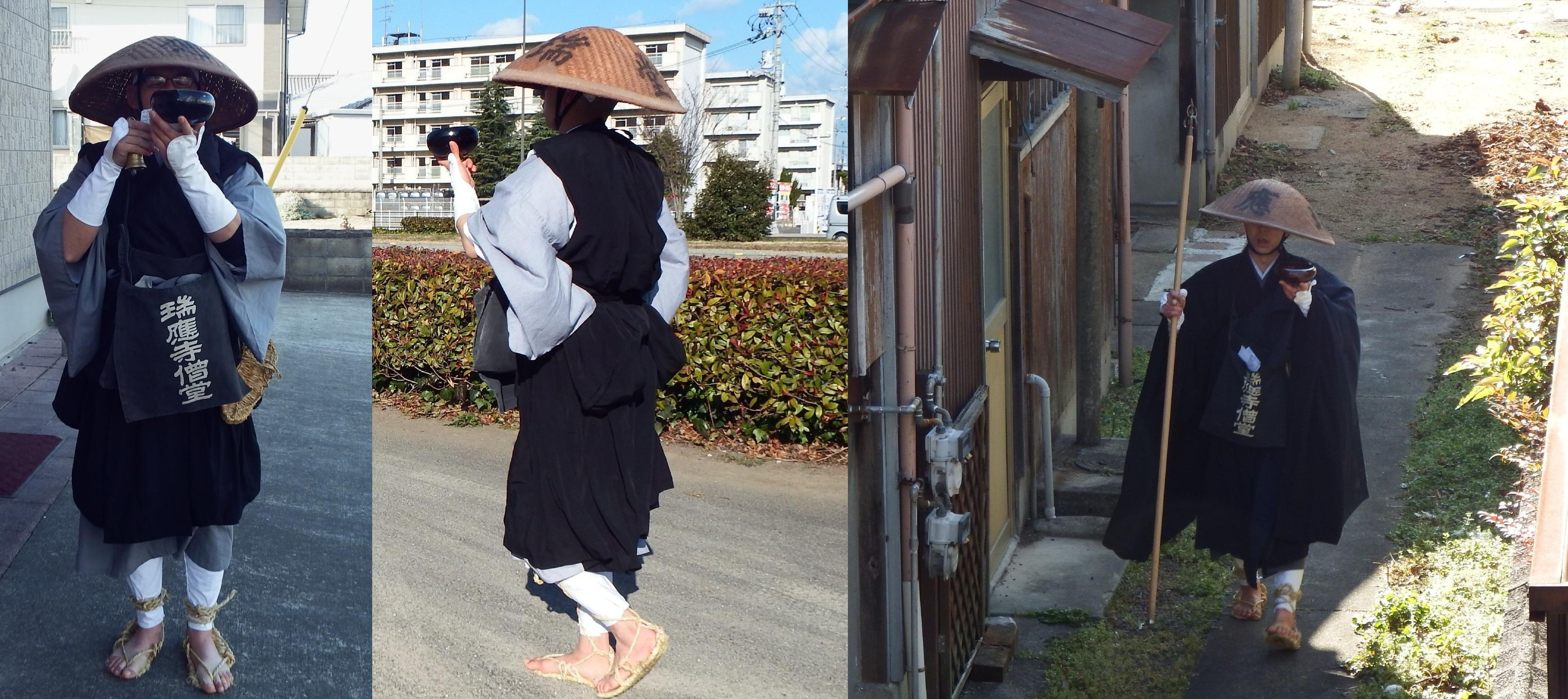
The practice of takuhatsu at Zuioji Temple

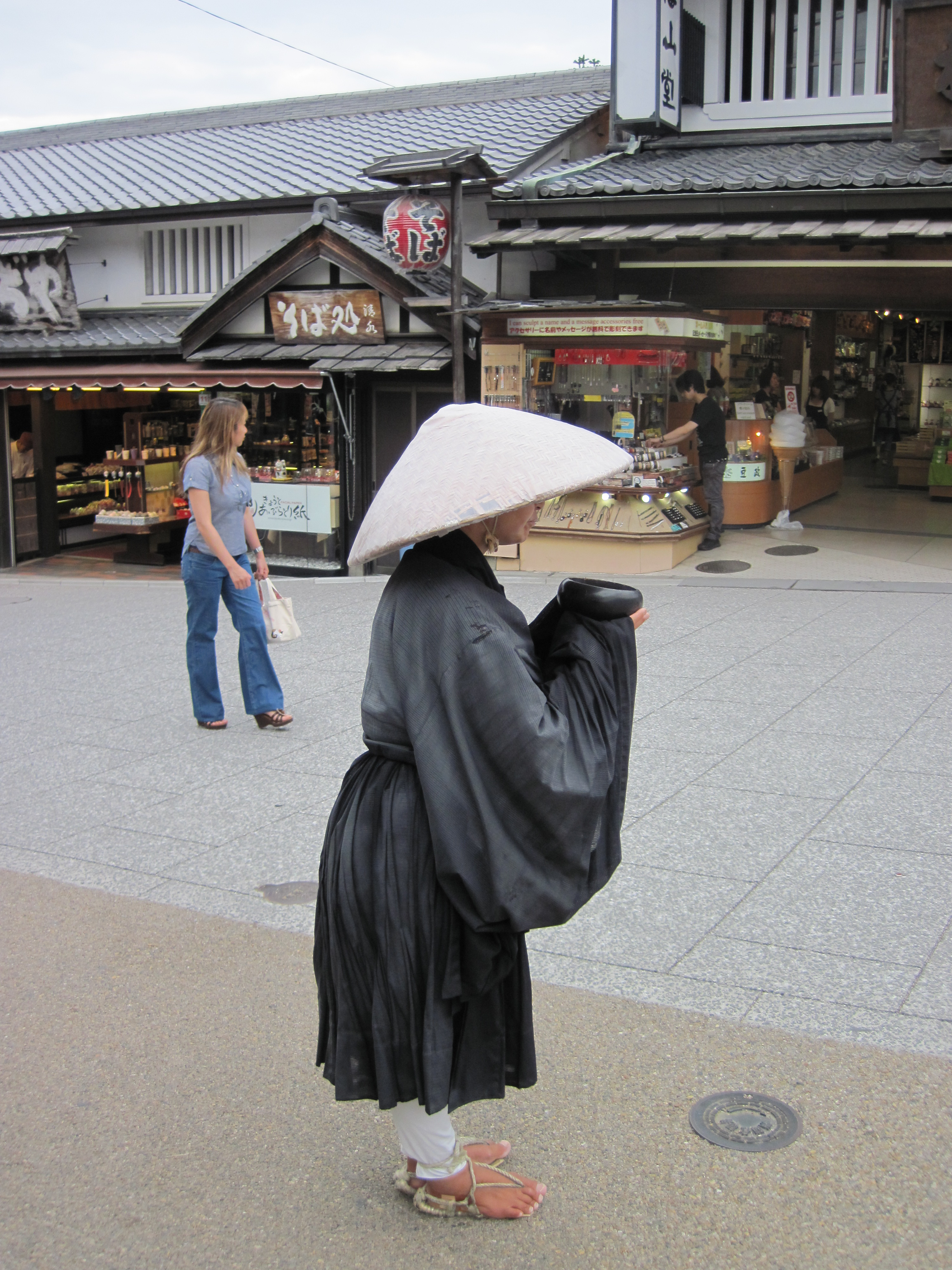
Takuhatsu practice in Kyoto, Japan

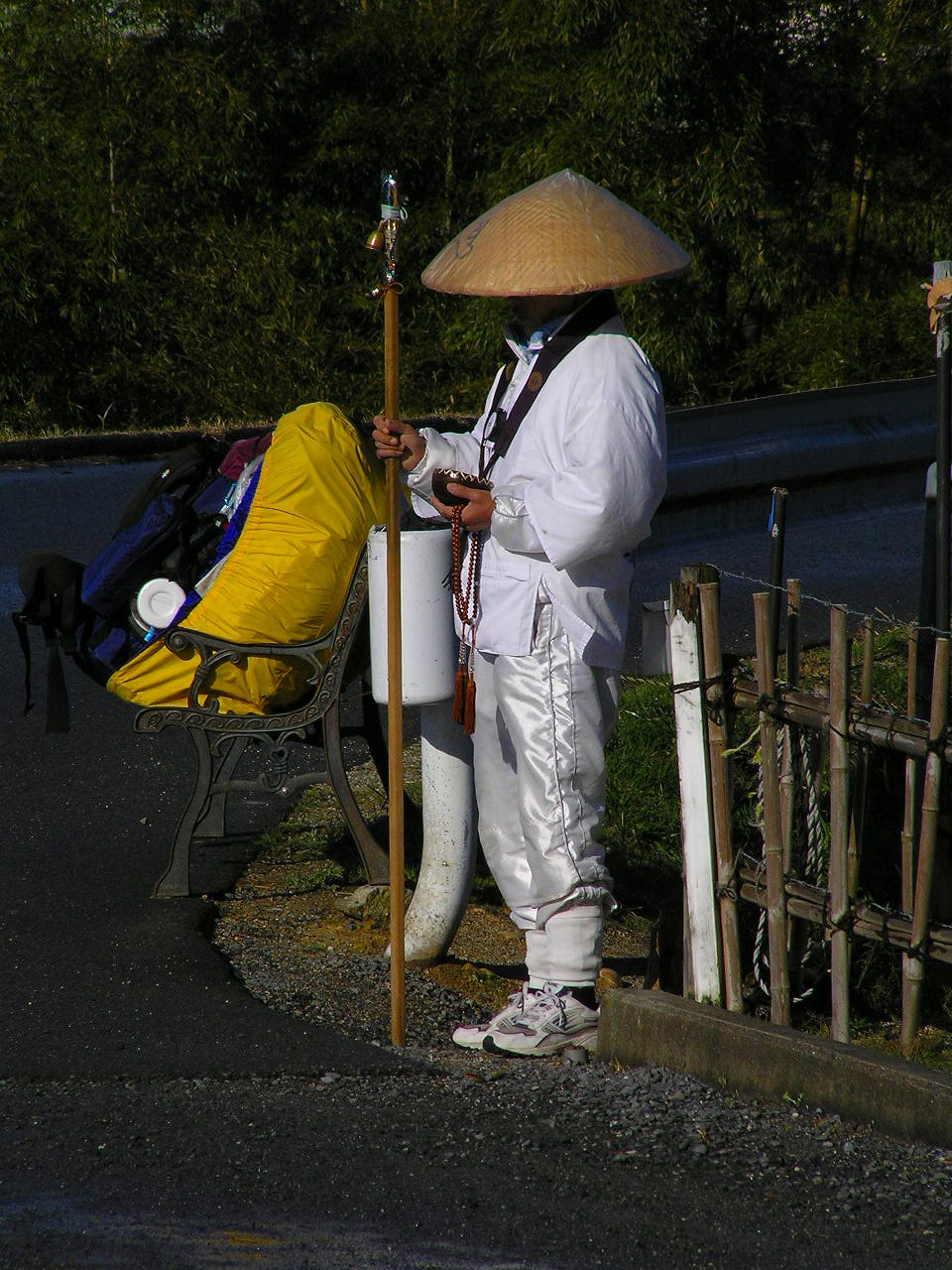
Takuhatsu practice at Hantaji Temple, Matsuyama

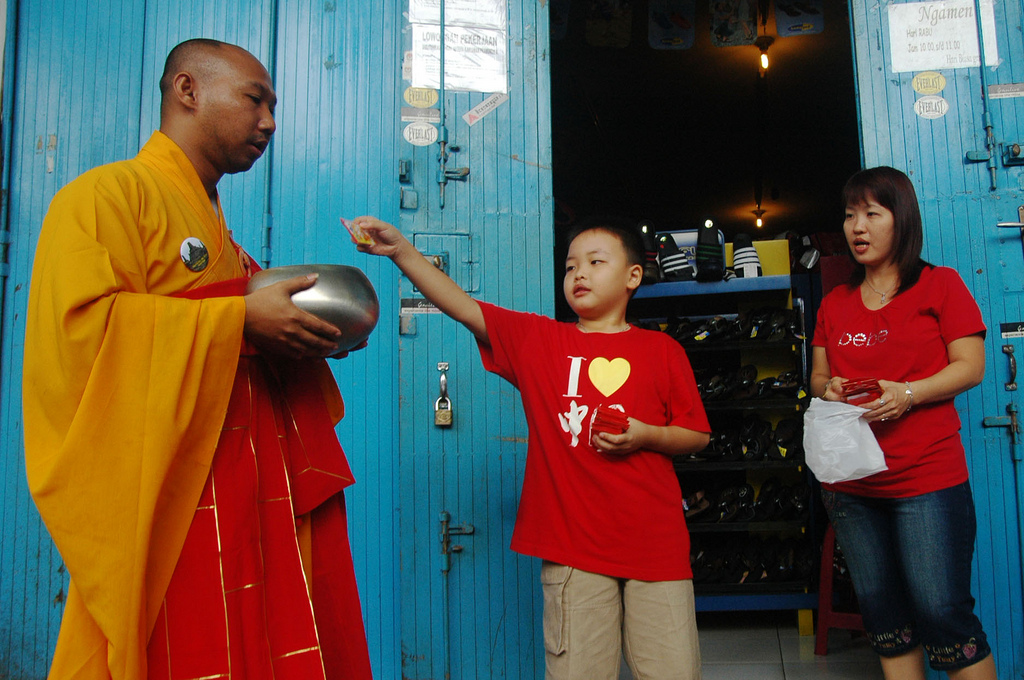
A Mahāyāna monk performs alms-gathering before the 2010 Vesak holiday in Magelang City, Central Java, Indonesia

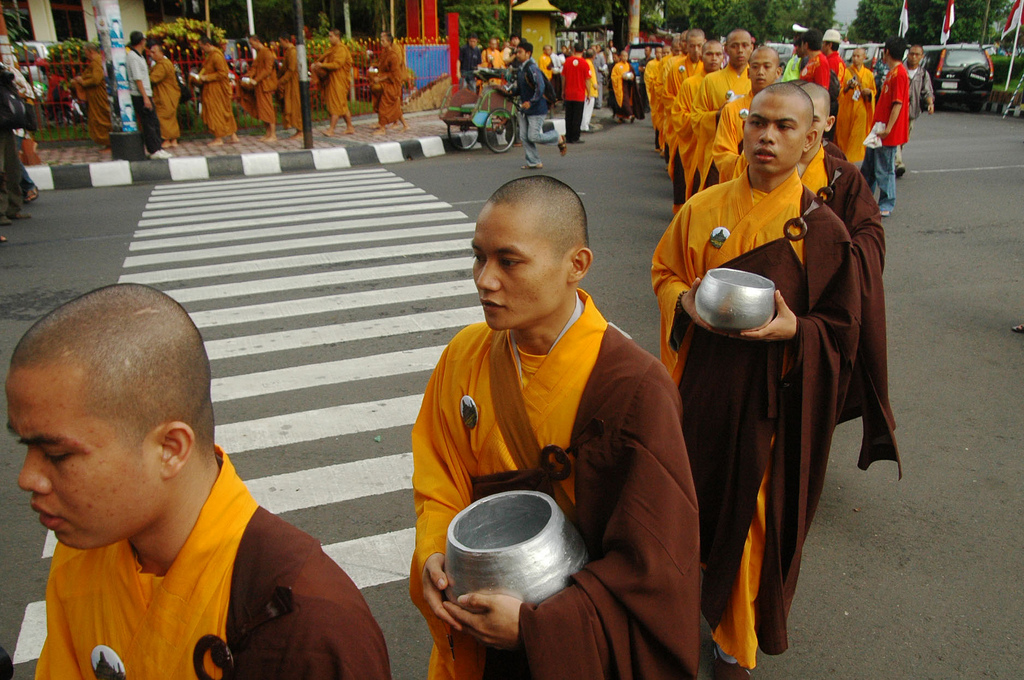
Mahāyāna monks performing alms round before the 2010 Vesak holiday in Magelang City, Central Java, Indonesia

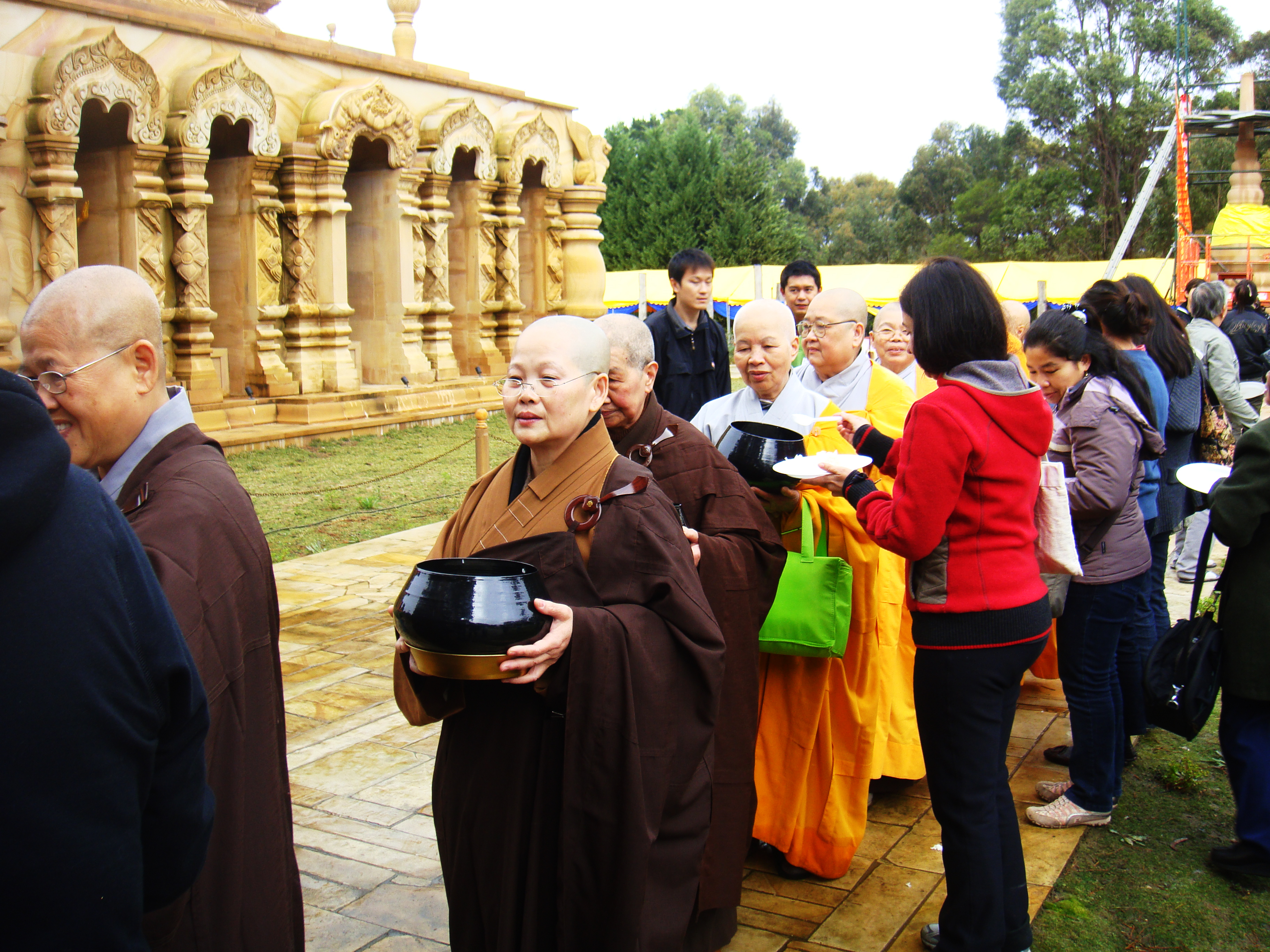
Mahāyāna nuns on alms round at Sunnataram Forest Monastery in Bundanoon, New South Wales, Australia

== See also ==
- Mendicant
