= Uma District, Ehime =

Former district in Ehime prefecture, Japan

Uma (宇摩郡, Uma-gun) was a district located in Ehime Prefecture, Japan.

As of 2003, the district had an estimated population of 19,040 with the total area of 165.50 km^{2}.

== History ==
- 1878 - due to the land reforms, the district created 24 villages. (24 villages)
- July 1, 1894 - the village of Mazaki broke up into the villages of Tenma and Kaburasaki. (25 villages)
- November 21, 1898 - the village of Mishima was elevated to town status to become the town of Mishima. (1 town, 24 villages)
- December 21, 1898 - the village of Kawanoe was elevated to town status to become the town of Kawanoe. (2 towns, 23 villages)
- January 1, 1913 - the village of Kamibun was elevated to town status to become the town of Kamibun. (3 towns, 22 villages)
- February 11, 1940 - the villages of Tsune and Noda were merged to become the village of Nagatsu. (3 towns, 21 villages)
- April 1, 1944 - the villages of Nakasone, Nakanoshō and Shōhaku were merged into the town of Mishima. (3 towns, 18 villages)
- April 3, 1948 - the village of Kinsei was elevated to town status to become the town of Kinsei. (4 towns, 17 villages)
- October 1, 1950 - the village of Shōhaku was split from the town of Mishima. (4 towns, 18 villages)
- June 1, 1952 - the village of Sankawa was elevated to town status to become the town of Sankawa. (5 towns, 17 villages)
- March 31, 1954 - the village of Futana was merged into the town of Kawanoe. (5 towns, 16 villages)
- March 31, 1954 - the villages of Nagatsu, Kofuji, Tenma, Kaburasaki, Doi and Sekigawa were merged to create the town of Doi. (6 towns, 10 villages)
- March 31, 1954 - the villages of Shinritsu and Kamiyama merged to form the village of Shingū. (6 towns, 9 villages)
- November 11, 1954 - the town of Kawanoe, the village of Mendori, the towns of Kamibun, Kinsei, and the villages of Kawataki and Kanada merged to form the city of Kawanoe. (3 towns, 6 villages)
- November 1, 1954 - the town of Mishima, the village of Shōhaku, the town of Sankawa, and the villages of Toyooka, Tomisato and Kinsha were merged to create the city of Iyomishima. (1 town, 2 villages)
- April 1, 2003 - the village of Besshiyama was merged into the expanded city of Niihama. (1 town, 1 village)
- April 1, 2004 - the town of Doi, and the village of Shingū, along with the old cities of Iyomishima and Kawanoe, were merged to create the city of Shikokuchūō. Uma District was dissolved as a result of this merger.

== See also ==
- List of dissolved districts of Japan
