= Umamukaiyama Kofun =

Burial mound in Japan

- 宇摩向山古墳 (Japanese)
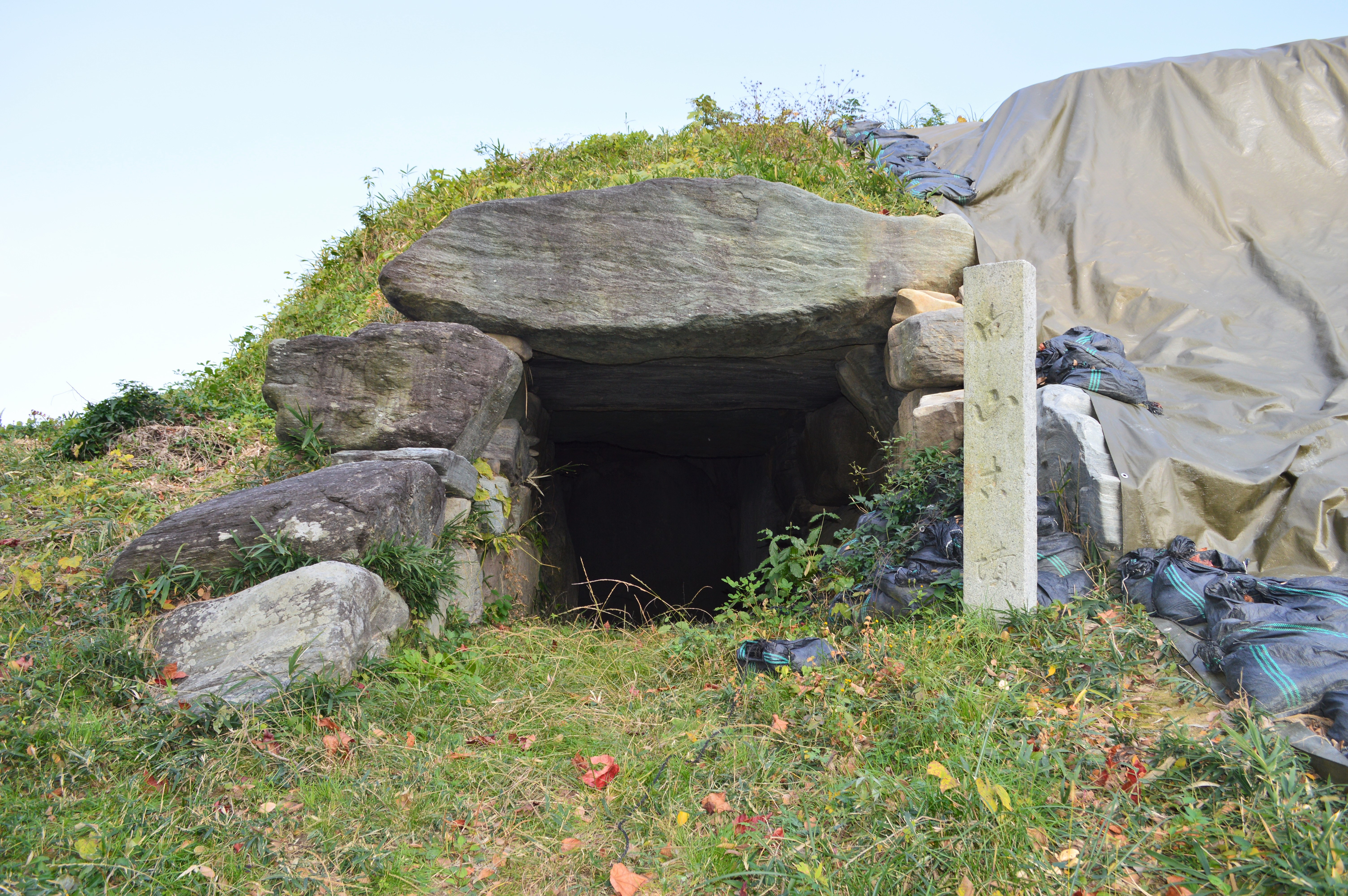
- Umamukaiyama Kofun, Burial Chamber No.1

- Umamukaiyama Kofun Umamukaiyama Kofun (Japan)
- Interactive map of Umamukaiyama Kofun
- 34°0′24.22″N 133°35′5.4″E
- Type: Kofun
- Periods: Kofun period
- Location: Shikokuchūō, Ehime, Japan
- Region: Shikoku region

History
- Built: early 7th century

Site notes
- Elevation: 121 m (397 ft)
- Length: 70 m (230 ft)
- Width: 46 m (151 ft)
- Excavation dates: 2003-2009
- Public access: Yes

The Umamukaiyama Kofun (宇摩向山古墳) is a Kofun period burial mound, located in the Kinseicho neighborhood of the city of Shikokuchūō, Ehime on the island of Shikoku in Japan. It was designated a National Historic Site of Japan in 2011. It is the largest rectangular burial mound in Shikoku.

== Overview ==
The Umamukaiyama Kofun is located on a hill with an elevation of 20 meters on the east bank of the Kinsei River that flows through the eastern part of the Uma Plain, which is roughly in the center of the Seto Inland Sea of Shikoku. The tumulus is a rectangular hōfun (方墳), with two side-entry stone burial chambers that both open to the south. An archaeological excavation conducted from 2003 to 2009 found that the tumulus measured 46 meters from north-to-south by 70 meters east-to-west, and had a moat with a width of five meters and depth of two meters on at least the south and north sides. Burial Chamber No. 1 to the west was 10.8 meters long, with an internal room of 3.9 by 2.5 meters and a height of 2.6 meters, and is in good condition. Burial Chamber No. 2 to the east was 14.3 meters long, and its internal room was estimated to be 3.8 meters high, and is partially collapsed. The chambers were made from massive monoliths of crystalline schist weighing several hundred tons, which had been quarried to the south of the Shikoku Mountains and brought to this location by some unknown means. From the fact that the two stone chambers are parallel and the elevation of the floor surface of both stone chambers is the same, it seems that the construction of two stone chambers. was intended from the beginning of the construction of the tumulus. The size of the monoliths and burial chambers has led the tumulus to be dubbed the "Iyo no Ishibutai" after the famous Ishibutai Kofun in Asuka, Nara.

The tumulus is estimated have been constructed in the early 7th century, based on the Sue ware and other grave goods, such as gilt bronze rings and chalcedony magatama found in Burial Chamber No1, when the door was opened in 1893 by local antiquarians. The whereabouts of most of these artifacts is now unknown.

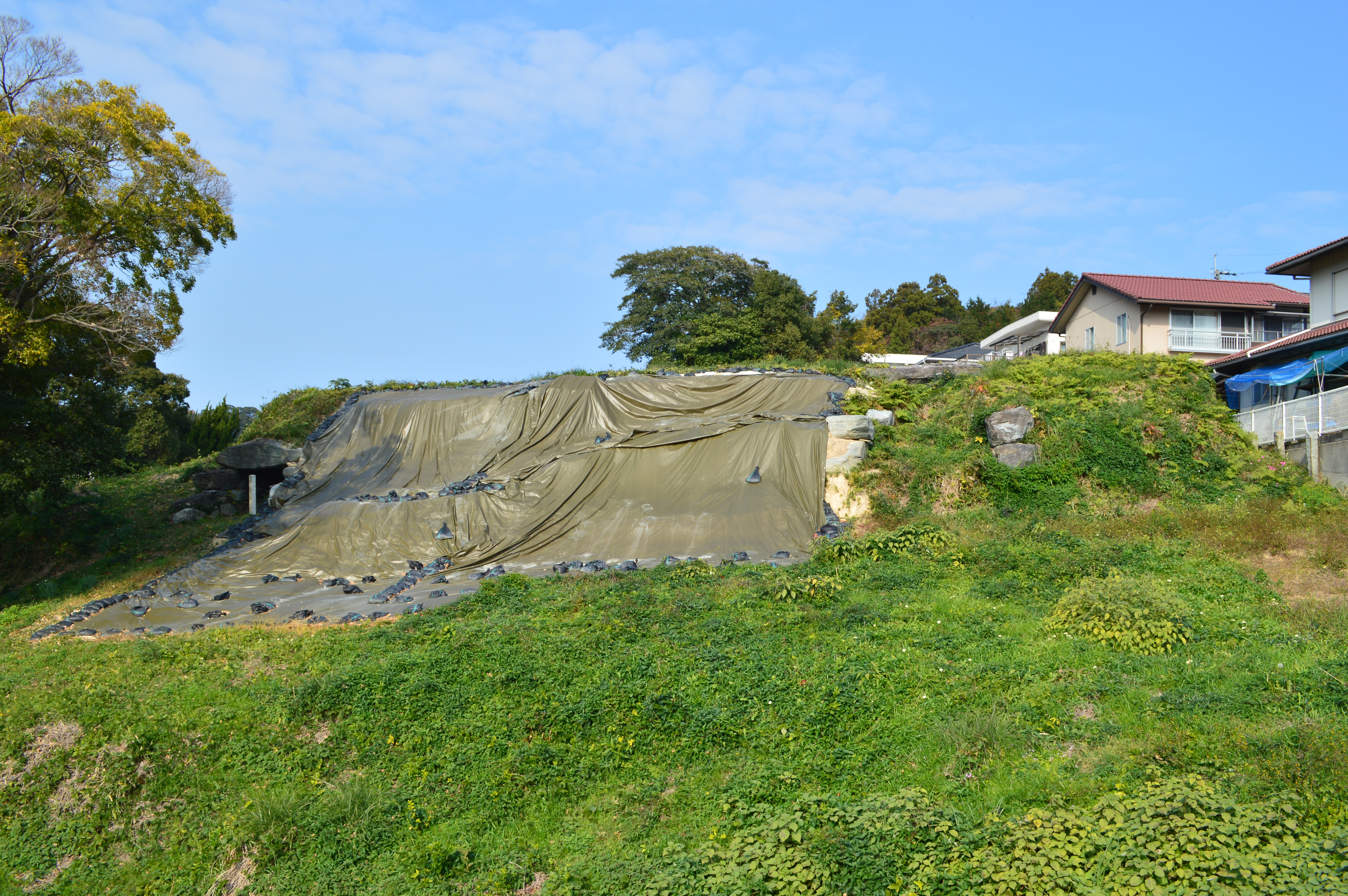
Umamukaiyama Kofun

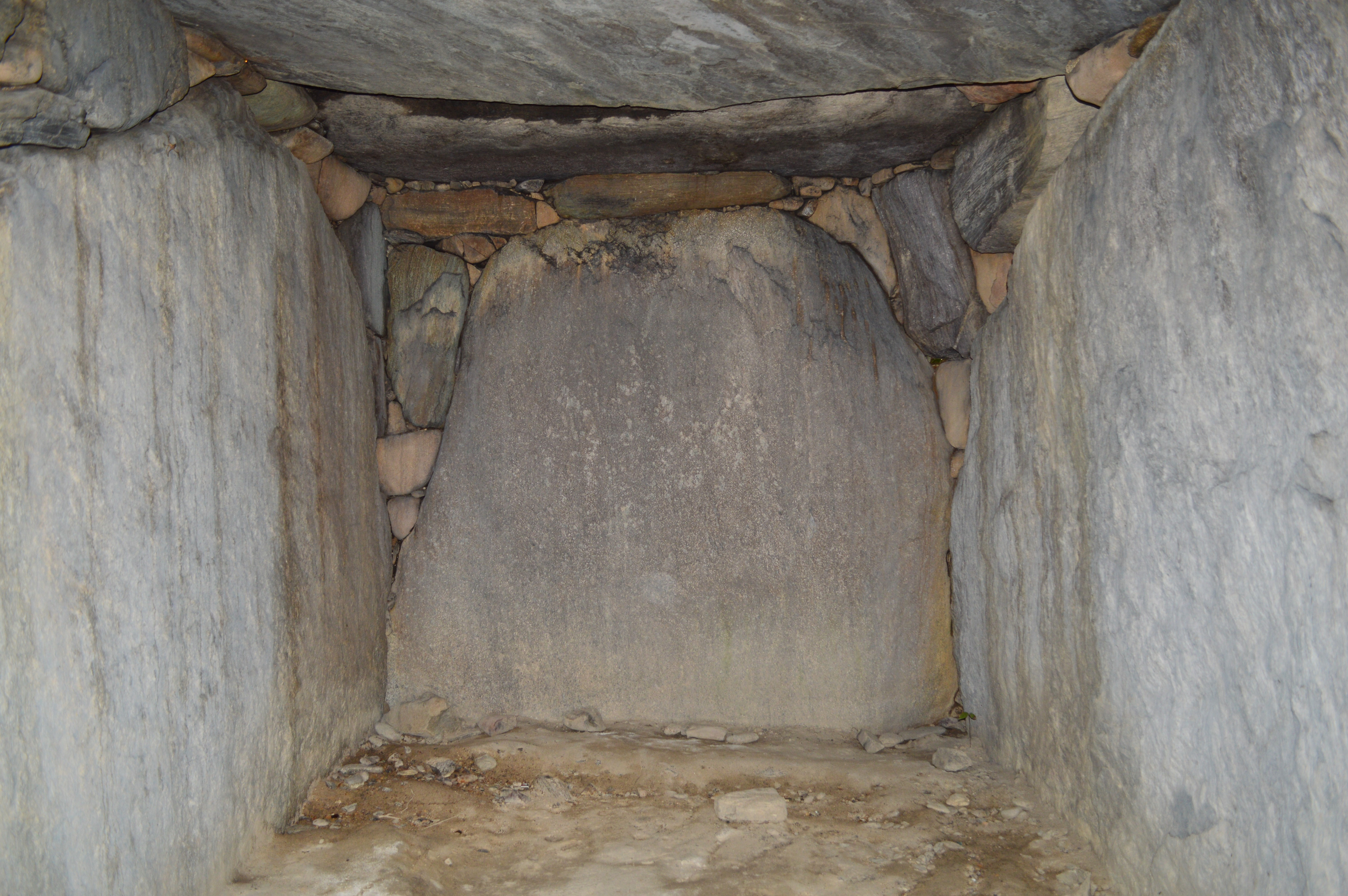
No.1 Burial Chamber, far end

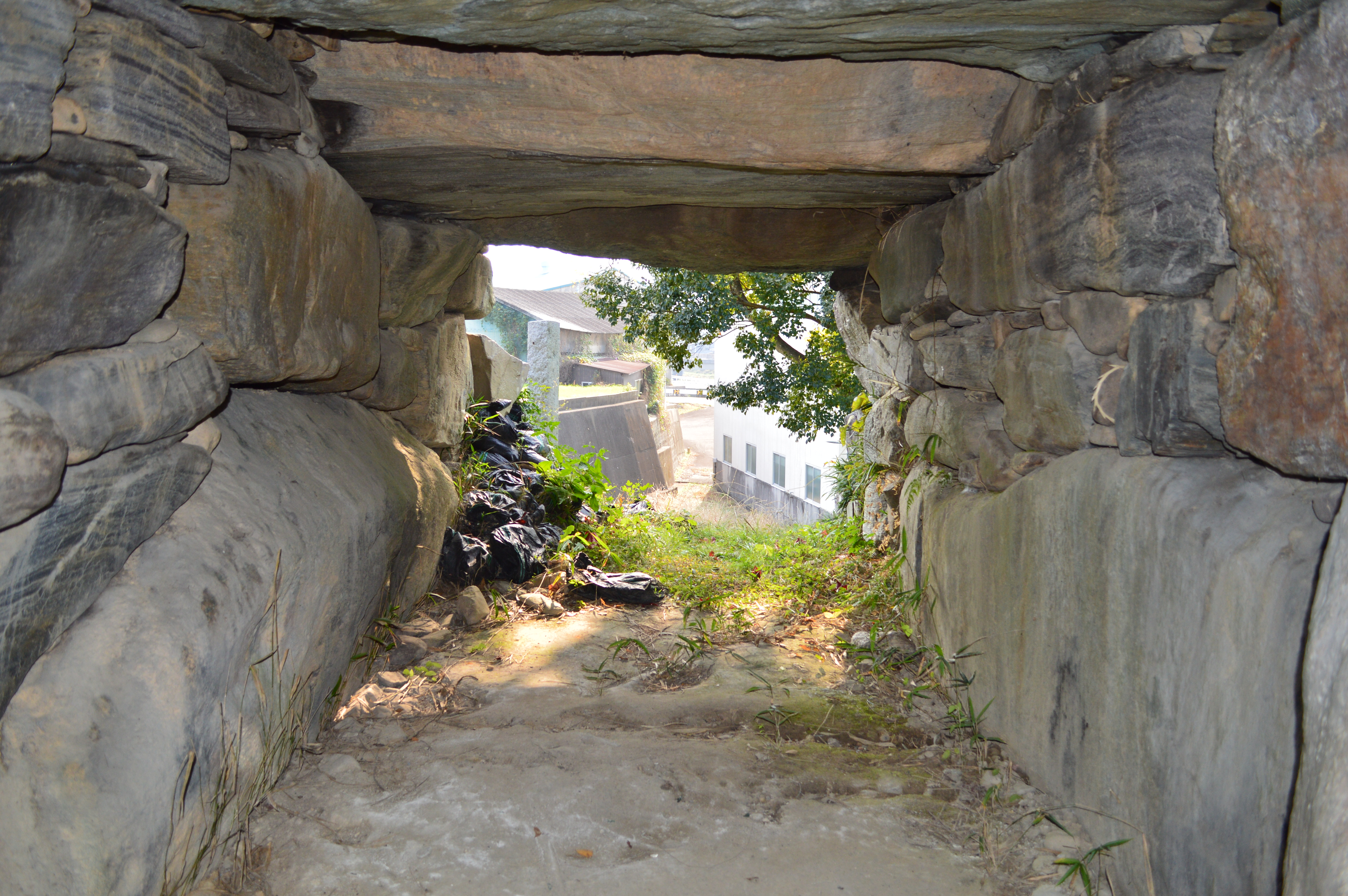
No1 Burial Chamber, entry

== See also ==
- List of Historic Sites of Japan (Ehime)
