= Shoji Kokami =

Shoji Kokami (鴻上尚史, Kōkami Shōji; born 2 August 1958) is a Japanese playwright, director, actor, and filmmaker.

== Career ==
Born in Niihama, Ehime, Kōkami was attending Waseda University when he founded the theatrical company Daisanbutai (Third Stage). Becoming "one of the prime movers in the 1980s small-scale youth theater movement in Japan", he won the Kunio Kishida Award in 1995 for his play Sunafukin no tegami. Earning a fellowship from the Agency for Cultural Affairs in 1997, he spent a year in London, and has since presented such plays as Trance on the London stage. The play Halcyon Days, which he wrote about suicide websites in Japan, has also been presented in Great Britain. In 2010 he won the 61st Yomiuri Prize for Drama.

Kōkami has also directed and acted in several films including Renai Gikyoku: Watashi to koi ni ochitekudasai.

== Cool Japan ==
Kokami is the co-host of Cool Japan airing on NHK World-Japan, which attempts to explores the charm and secrets of cool Japanese culture by making full use of the sensibilities of foreigners who live and work in Japan.

The program is accompanied by 8 foreign panelists and a Japanese commentator who is an expert in the episode's subject. However, some "special" episodes have had large groups (30+) of returning guests. The program is unique in that it features Japanese and English language and subtitles, as the foreign guests always speak in English, regardless of their native language or fluency in Japanese.

Marty Friedman, the guitarist for Megadeth, has also appeared as the expert (for music) commentator several times, as he has been a resident of Shinjuku for many years
