= Doi, Ehime =

Dissolved municipality in Ehime prefecture, Japan

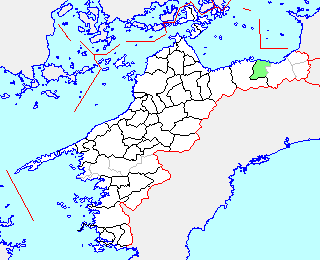
Doi in Ehime Prefecture

Doi (土居町, Doi-chō) was a town located in Uma District, Ehime Prefecture, Shikoku, Japan.

As of 2003, the town had an estimated population of 17,387 and a density of 200.59 persons per km^{2}. Its total area was 86.68 km^{2}.

On April 1, 2004, Doi along with the village of Shingū (also from Uma District), and the old cities of Iyomishima and Kawanoe, was merged to create the city of Shikokuchūō.

== See also ==
- Doi, Ehime (village) - a predecessor of the town
- Doi taikomatsuri - a festival in Doi
