= Iyomishima, Ehime =

Dissolved municipality in Ehime prefecture, Japan

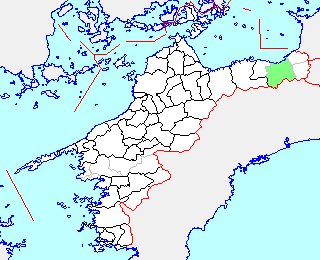
Iyomishima in Ehime Prefecture

Iyomishima (伊予三島市, Iyomishima-shi) was a city located in Ehime Prefecture, Japan. The city was founded on November 1, 1954.

As of 2003, the city had an estimated population of 37,010 and the density of 199.94 persons per km^{2}. The total area was 185.11 km^{2}.

On April 1, 2004, Iyomishima, along with the city of Kawanoe, the town of Doi, and the village of Shingū (both from Uma District), was merged to create the city of Shikokuchūō.

Iyomishima was known for the paper products industry and large industrial port on the Iyo-nada strait of the Seto Inland Sea.
