= Shingū, Ehime =

Dissolved municipality in Ehime prefecture, Japan

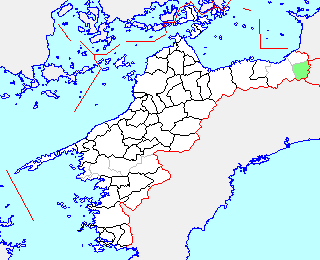
Shingu in Ehime Prefecture

Shingū (新宮村, Shingū-mura) was a village located in Uma District, Ehime Prefecture, Japan.

As of 2003, the village had an estimated population of 1,653 and a density of 20.97 persons per km^{2}. The total area was 78.82 km^{2}.

On April 1, 2004, Shingū, along with the town of Doi (also from Uma District), the cities of Iyomishima and Kawanoe, was merged to create the city of Shikokuchūō.
