= Niihama National College of Technology =

Coordinates: 33°57′39″N 133°17′28″E

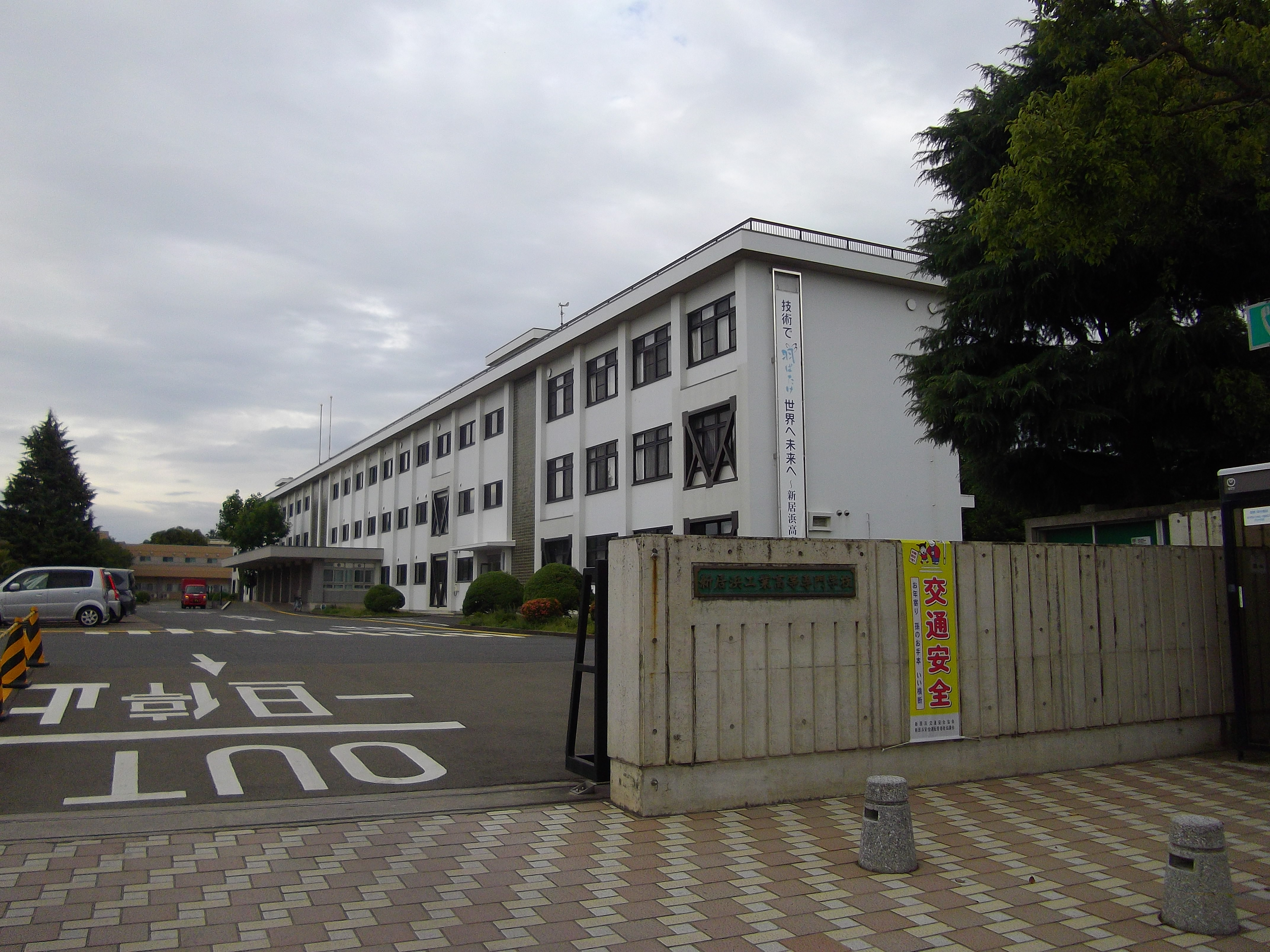
Niihama National College of Technology

The Niihama National College of Technology (新居浜工業高等専門学校, Niihama kōgyō kōtō senmon gakkō) is a technology college in Niihama, Ehime, Japan. Established in 1962, it combines high school and college into a five-year course.

The college offers undergraduate courses in Mechanical Engineering, Electrical Engineering and Information Science, Electronic Control Engineering, Applied Chemistry and Biotechnology, and Environmental Materials Engineering, as well as three advanced engineering courses.
