= Kawanoe, Ehime =

City in Ehime Prefecture, Japan

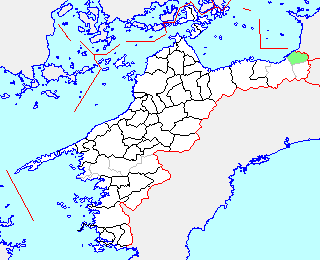
Kawanoe in Ehime Prefecture

The flag of Kawanoe, Ehime

Kawanoe (川之江市, Kawanoe-shi) was a city located in Ehime Prefecture, Japan. The city was founded on November 1, 1954.

As of 2003, the city had an estimated population of 37,612 and population density of 543.13 persons per km^{2}. The total area was 69.25 km^{2}.

On April 1, 2004, Kawanoe, along with the city of Iyomishima, the town of Doi, and the village of Shingū (both from Uma District), was merged to create the city of Shikokuchūō.
