= Zuiō-ji =

Zen monastery in Niihama, Ehime, Japan

Zuiō-ji 瑞應寺
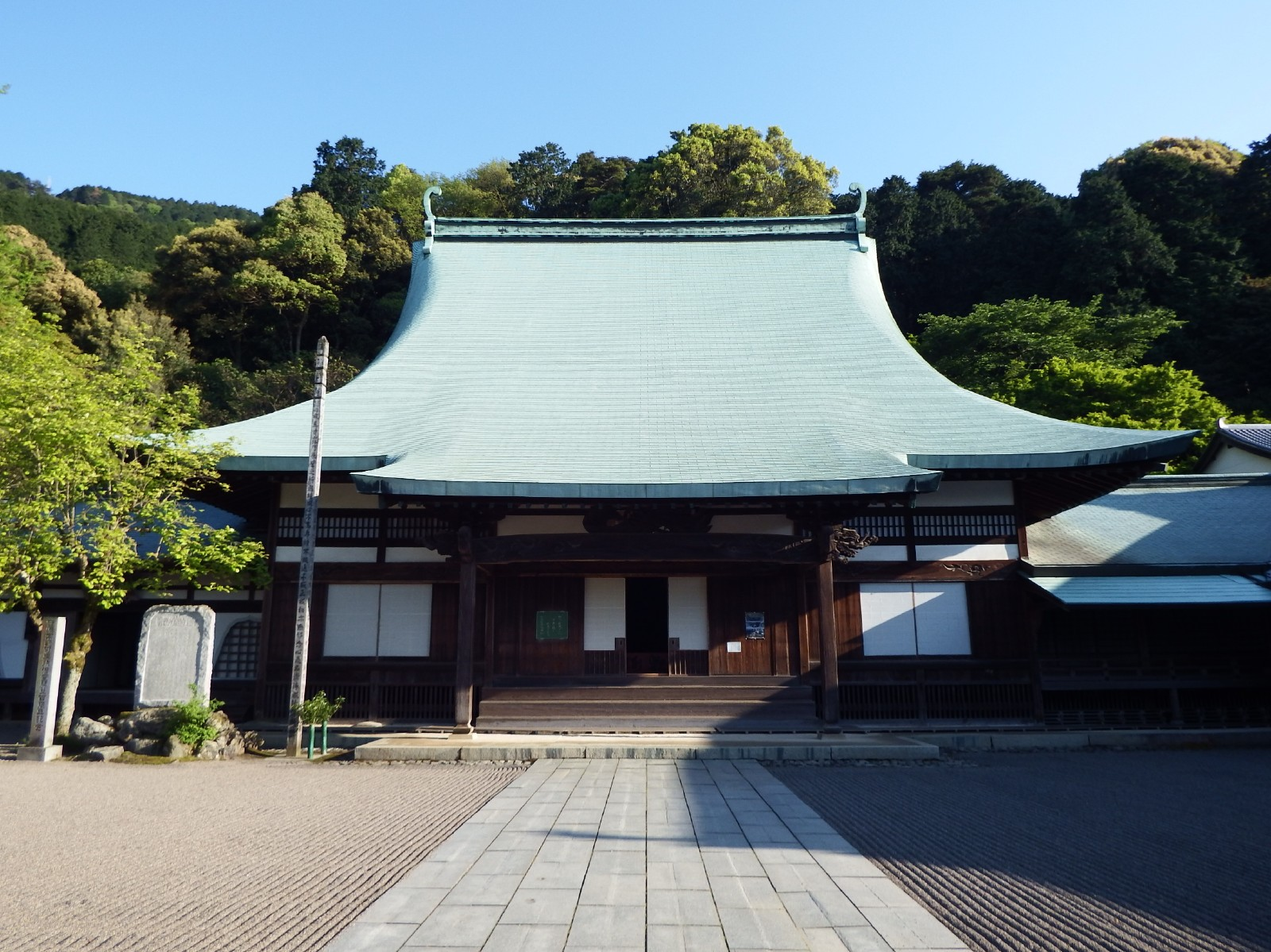
- Main Hall

Religion
- Affiliation: Sōtō Zen
- Deity: Shaka Nyorai (Śākyamuni)

Location
- Location: 8-1 Yamanechō, Niihama, Ehime Prefecture
- Country: Japan
- Interactive map of Zuiō-ji 瑞應寺
- Coordinates: 33°55′9.26″N 133°18′6.24″E

Architecture
- Completed: 1448

Zuiō-ji (瑞應寺) is a Sōtō Zen monastery in Niihama, Ehime Prefecture, in Japan.

== See also ==
- Buddhism in Japan
