= Shikokuchūō =

Shikokuchūō 四国中央市
- City
- Doi Taiko (Japanese drum) Festival, held on October 13 to 15 every year

- Flag Seal
- Location of Shikokuchūō in Ehime Prefecture

- Location in Japan
- Coordinates: 33°59′N 133°33′E
- Country: Japan
- Region: Shikoku
- Prefecture: Ehime
- Kawanoe city settled: November 1, 1954
- Iyo-Mishima city settled: November 1, 1954
- Doi town settled: March 31, 1954
- Singu village settled: March 31, 1954
- Four municipalities mrged: April 1, 2004

Government
  - Mayor: Kenji Ōnishi (大西賢治) - from May 2026

Area
  - Total: 421.24 km^{2} (162.64 sq mi)

Population (August 31, 2022)
  - Total: 83,635
  - Density: 198.54/km^{2} (514.23/sq mi)
- Time zone: UTC+09:00 (JST)
- City hall address: 4-6-55 Miyagawa, Mishima, Shikokuchūō-shi, Ehime-ken 799-0497
- Climate: Cfa
- Website: Official website

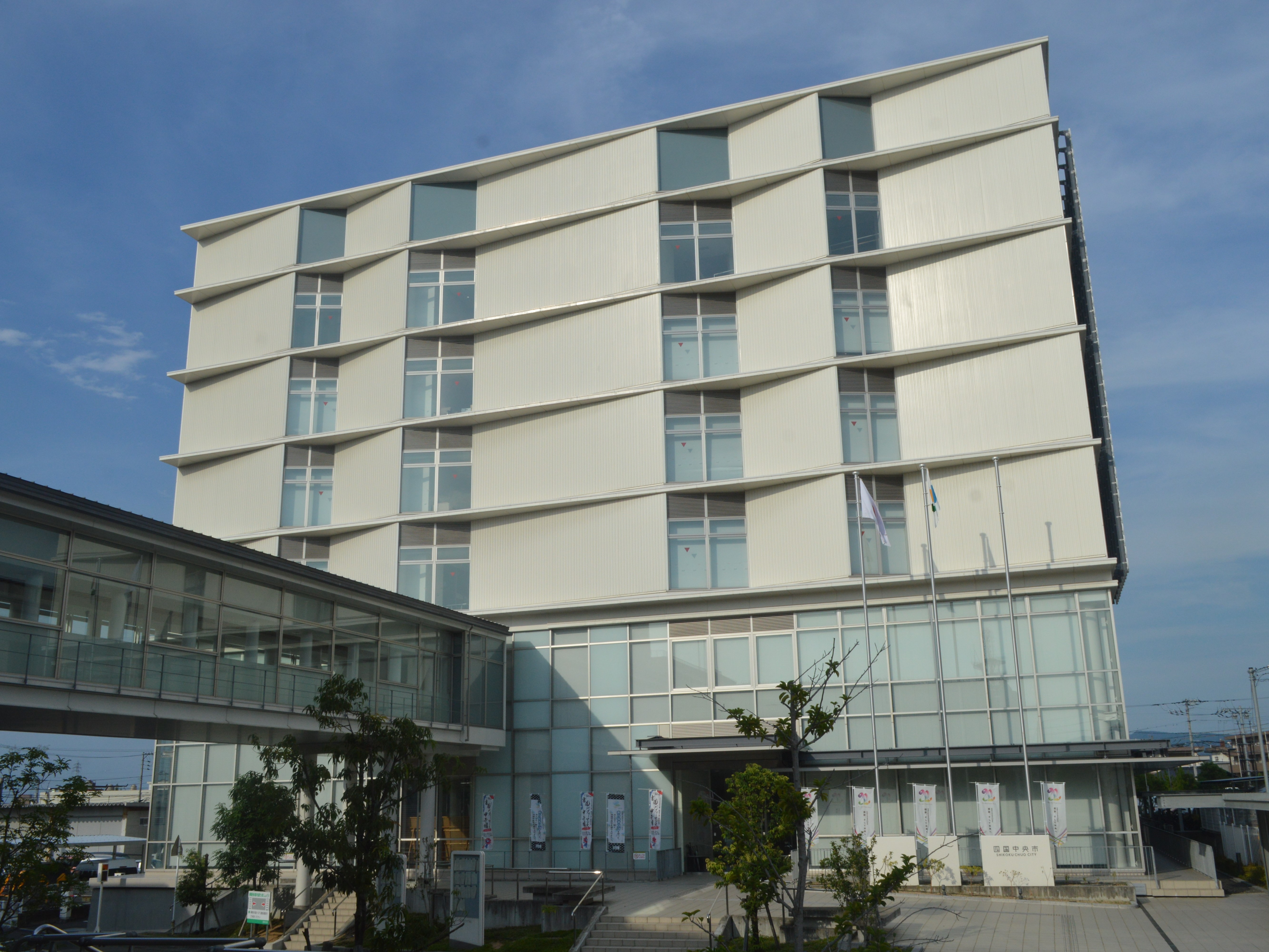
Shikokuchūō City Hall

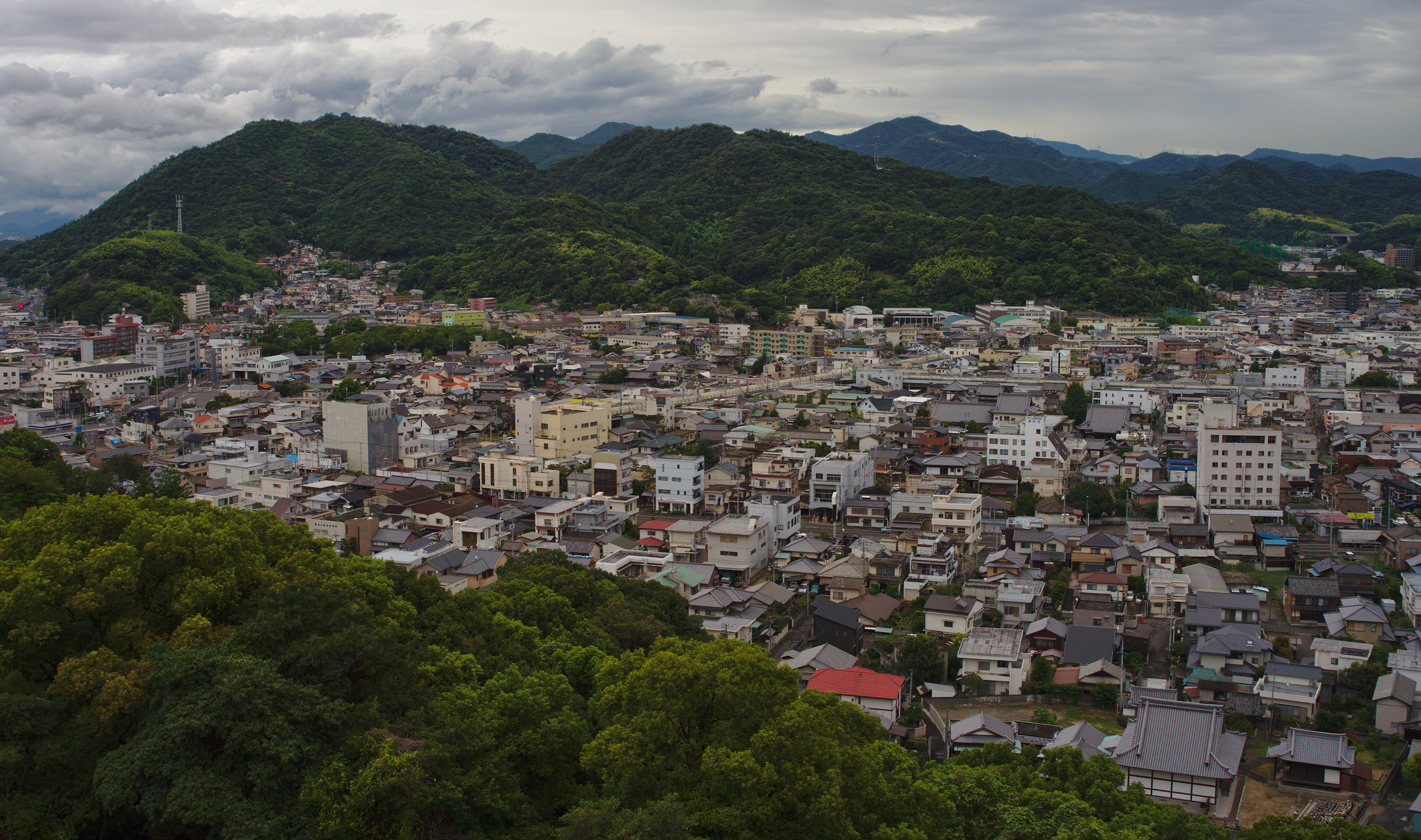
Panoramic view of downtown Kawanoe area, from Kawanoe Castle

Shikokuchūō (四国中央市, Shikokuchūō-shi; lit. "Central Shikoku City") is a city located in Ehime Prefecture, Japan. As of August 31, 2022, the city had an estimated population of 83,635 in 28876 households and a population density of 200 persons per km². The total area of the city is 421.24 square kilometres (162.64 sq mi). Shikokuchūō is the leading producer of paper and paper products in Japan. It is also a port city and one of Ehime's major centers of industry.

== Geography ==
Shikokuchūō is located in eastern Ehime Prefecture, with the Hoō Mountains to the south and the Gulf of Hiuchi of the Seto Inland Sea to the north. Because the plains are narrow, a local wind called "Yamaji" blows down from the mountains toward the sea. To the south of the Hoō Mountains, the Douzan River, one of the Yoshino River's tributaries, flows eastward, and further south are the Shikoku Mountains, which forms the border with Kōchi Prefecture. The Japan Median Tectonic Line runs east-west along the foot of the Hoō Mountains. The city is located 60 kilometers from Kōchi city, 70 kilometers from Takamatsu, 80 kilometers from Matsuyama, Ehime and 100 kilometers from Tokushima.

=== Neighbouring municipalities ===
Ehime Prefecture

- Niihama

Kagawa Prefecture

- Kanonji

Kōchi Prefecture

- Motoyama
- Ōkawa
- Ōtoyo
- Tosa town

Tokushima Prefecture

- Miyoshi

=== Climate ===
Shikokuchūō has a humid subtropical climate (Köppen Cfa) characterized by warm summers and cool winters with light snowfall. The average annual temperature in Shikokuchūō is 12.5 °C. The average annual rainfall is 2030 mm with September as the wettest month. The temperatures are highest on average in August, at around 23.7 °C, and lowest in January, at around 1.3 °C.

Climate data for Shikokuchūō (1991−2020 normals, extremes 1978−present)
Month	Jan	Feb	Mar	Apr	May	Jun	Jul	Aug	Sep	Oct	Nov	Dec	Year
Record high °C (°F)	20.3 (68.5)	23.7 (74.7)	27.6 (81.7)	29.8 (85.6)	32.2 (90.0)	35.2 (95.4)	38.3 (100.9)	37.9 (100.2)	37.2 (99.0)	32.3 (90.1)	25.8 (78.4)	22.0 (71.6)	38.3 (100.9)
Mean daily maximum °C (°F)	9.3 (48.7)	10.0 (50.0)	13.6 (56.5)	19.3 (66.7)	24.2 (75.6)	26.8 (80.2)	31.0 (87.8)	32.2 (90.0)	28.1 (82.6)	22.6 (72.7)	17.0 (62.6)	11.8 (53.2)	20.5 (68.9)
Daily mean °C (°F)	5.9 (42.6)	6.2 (43.2)	9.3 (48.7)	14.4 (57.9)	19.3 (66.7)	22.7 (72.9)	26.9 (80.4)	27.9 (82.2)	24.1 (75.4)	18.6 (65.5)	13.2 (55.8)	8.3 (46.9)	16.4 (61.5)
Mean daily minimum °C (°F)	2.6 (36.7)	2.6 (36.7)	5.2 (41.4)	9.9 (49.8)	14.8 (58.6)	19.3 (66.7)	23.5 (74.3)	24.4 (75.9)	20.7 (69.3)	15.0 (59.0)	9.5 (49.1)	5.0 (41.0)	12.7 (54.9)
Record low °C (°F)	−3.5 (25.7)	−5.4 (22.3)	−3.1 (26.4)	0.7 (33.3)	5.4 (41.7)	11.8 (53.2)	17.0 (62.6)	17.9 (64.2)	10.6 (51.1)	6.7 (44.1)	0.2 (32.4)	−2.3 (27.9)	−5.4 (22.3)
Average precipitation mm (inches)	44.9 (1.77)	56.2 (2.21)	94.9 (3.74)	89.2 (3.51)	113.2 (4.46)	175.8 (6.92)	198.7 (7.82)	162.6 (6.40)	232.5 (9.15)	142.5 (5.61)	69.5 (2.74)	64.5 (2.54)	1,444.4 (56.87)
Average precipitation days (≥ 1.0 mm)	7.2	8.3	10.6	9.6	9.4	12.6	10.8	8.7	10.6	8.7	7.4	9.1	113
Mean monthly sunshine hours	107.1	117.4	159.0	184.5	194.4	130.7	166.5	194.9	134.8	138.4	112.6	98.4	1,736
Source: JMA

== Demographics ==
Per Japanese census data, the population of Shikokuchūō has decreased slightly since the 1960s.

Historical population
Year	Pop.	±%
1920	67,329	—
1930	71,067	+5.6%
1940	74,134	+4.3%
1950	101,575	+37.0%
1960	100,209	−1.3%
1970	92,663	−7.5%
1980	95,168	+2.7%
1990	97,215	+2.2%
2000	94,326	−3.0%
2010	90,187	−4.4%
2020	82,754	−8.2%

== History ==
The area of Shikokuchūō was part of ancient Iyo Province. Ruins found within the city limits suggest that the area was first inhabited more than 12,000 years ago. People first lived in the hilly areas along the Kinugawa River, and then spread to the coastal plains from the Jomon period to the Yayoi period. In the middle of the Kofun period, Toguyama Kofun, which is said to be the tomb of Prince Kinashi Karu, was constructed. In the late Kofun period, in the 6th century, burial mounds began to be built in hilly areas. In the first half of the 7th century, the Umamukaiyama Kofun, which has one of the largest stone burial chambers in Shikoku, was built. After the Nara period Taika Reforms, this area came to be called Uma District. The city limits of Uma District and modern Shikokuchūō are almost the same. As Uma is centrally located in Shikoku, it was historically a transportation hub between Shikoku's major cities. Due to its strategic importance, during the Sengoku period Uma was repeatedly invaded by the neighboring warlords. During the Edo Period, the area as divided between the holdings of Imabari Domain, Saijō Domain and tenryō territory administered on behalf of the Tokugawa shogunate by Iyo-Matsuyama Domain. Industry began to flourish in Uma during the Edo period, and the city grew as a port town. The Tosa kaidō offered access to Tosa Province in the south, so Uma was also a stopping spot, or ‘post station,’ for the Tosa daimyō and travelers to and from Tosa. Paper making began in Uma around 1750, and much later grew into the region's major industry.

Following the Meiji restoration, the area was divided into 25 villages with the establishment of the modern municipalities system on December 15, 1889. The villages of Mishima and Kawanoe were raised to town status in 1898. The village of Doi was raised to town status in 1954 and the villages of Shinritsu and Kamiyama merged to form the village of Shingū the same year. Late that year, Kawanoe and Mishima were raised to city status, with Mishima renamed Iyomishima.

Shikokuchūō city was founded on April 1, 2004 when the cities of Kawanoe, Iyomishima, the town of Doi and the village of Shingū merged. The name literally means "Shikoku Central City" and was so named in the hopes of becoming the new capital of the island of Shikoku, should the four prefectures be merged into one state. However, this name has been roundly criticized for its unoriginality, and is known as one of the "strange city names" throughout Japan.

The former cities of Kawanoe and Iyomishima (the two largest of the four municipalities that merged) have fought for political control over the new city.

== Government ==
Shikokuchūō has a mayor-council form of government with a directly elected mayor and a unicameral city council of 22 members. Shikokuchūō contributes three members to the Ehime Prefectural Assembly.

In terms of national politics, Shikokuchūō is part of Ehime 2nd district of the lower house of the Diet of Japan. Prior to 2022, the city was part of Ehime 3rd district.

== Economy ==
Shikokuchūō is one of the major industrial cities in the Ehime and Shikoku regions, and is one of Japan's leading paper manufacturing areas.

=== Paper industry ===
The history of the paper industry in Shikokuchūō extends back to around 1750, when washi was first produced in the Uma area. The area does not have much flat land, and is ill-suited to rice farming, but as water and paper mulberry (kōzo) are plentiful, it is ideal for paper manufacturing. The modern paper industry began to flourish when mechanized manufacturing techniques were developed in the Meiji era. After World War II, the paper industry contributed to the city's rapid economic growth.

The city paper museum, Kami no Machi Shiryokan, has exhibits and information on traditional paper making and the modern paper industry.

== Education ==
Shikokuchūō has 18 public elementary schools and six public middle schools and one combined public elementary/middle school operated by the city government. The city has three public high schools operated by the Ehime Prefectural Board of Education.

== Transportation ==
=== Railways ===
Shikoku Railway Company - Yosan Line

- Kawanoe - Iyo-Mishima - Iyo-Sangawa - Akaboshi - Iyo-Doi - Sekigawa

=== Highways ===
- Matsuyama Expressway
- Kōchi Expressway
- Takamatsu Expressway
- Tokushima Expressway
- National Route 11
- National Route 192
- National Route 319

=== Ports ===
- Port of Mishima-Kawanoe

== Local attractions ==
=== Junshin-do ===
The Buddhist monk Junshin dwelt here after he was expelled from Tosa province (modern day Kochi). As is described in the lyrics of the Yosakoi naruko dancing song, Junshin had an illicit affair with a comb-maker's daughter, and the two of them attempted to elope. After they were caught leaving Tosa without permission, Junshin was permanently expelled from Tosa, and the two of them were separated. Junshin lived in this building for the remainder of his life.

=== Kawanoe Castle ===
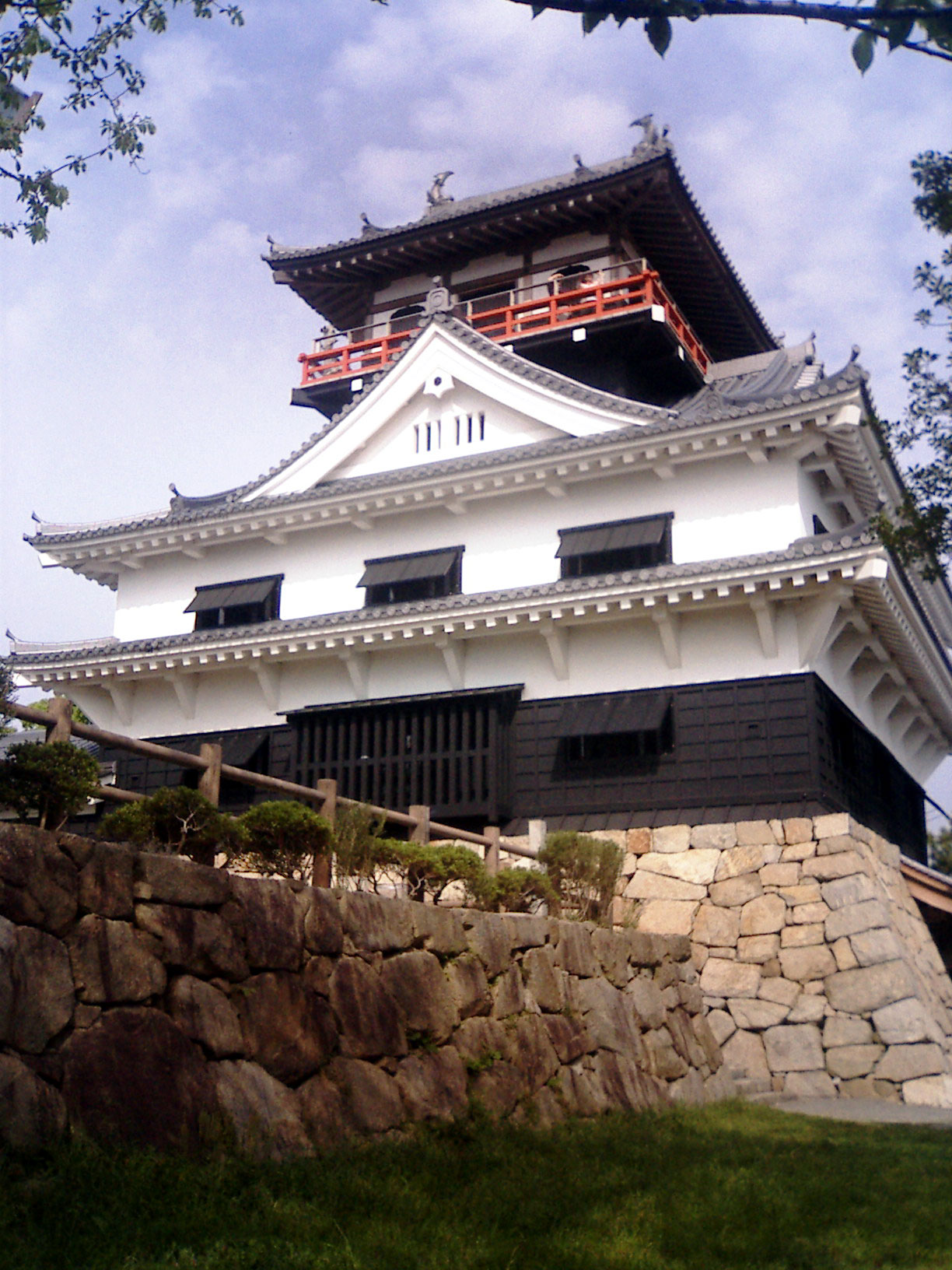
Kawanoe Castle

Kawanoe Castle was built in 1337 at the beginning of the Nanboku-cho period. For the next several hundred years, it was attacked repeatedly by armies from Sanuki, Awa, and Tosa. It fell to the armies of Toyotomi Hideyoshi in 1585, when he conquered Shikoku. The castle was torn down in 1611, and some of it was used for Matsuyama Castle. In 1984, Kawanoe City began a project to rebuild Kawanoe Castle. Construction was completed in 1988.

=== Kofun ===
Many burial mounds, or kofun, were built in the area during the mid to late Kofun period. These include the Toguzan burial mounds, the Kyogaoka burial mounds (circa sixth century AD), and the Umamukaiyama Kofun (early seventh century). The Toguzan kofun is said to be the grave of crown prince Kinashi no Karu no Miko, son of the nineteenth emperor, who in the Kojiki was banished to Iyo by his brother.

=== Manabe house ===
The Manabe house is the oldest extant minka (traditional Japanese house) in Ehime, and is designated as a national cultural treasure. The house was built by the Manabe family, who were descended from members of the Heike clan who fled to Shikoku after the Heike's defeat in the Genpei War.

=== Tosa Kaidō ===
The Tosa Kaidō is a direct route over the mountains between Tosa (modern day Kochi) and Iyo (modern day Ehime) that was used from ancient times to the Edo era. In Shikokuchūō, the road starts in Kawanoe, passes through Shingu, and continues to Sasagamine ridge in Otoyo Town, Kochi. Parts of the road date back to 793, when it was made an official government route of the Daijo-kan (the central government in Kyoto). The road later fell out of use by the government, but continued to be used by travelers and people in Shikoku for the next nine hundred years. From 1718, the Edo shogunate began to use the road for sankinkotai, the policy of forcing the daimyō of every han to move periodically between Edo and his han.

In recent years the Tosa Kaidō has been maintained through the efforts of volunteers. Hikers can walk on a footpath from Kawanoe to Otoyo, Kochi. (The path sometimes joins Ehime prefectural road 5.)

== In popular culture ==
=== Shodo Girls ===
The 2010 movie Shodo Girls!! Watashi-tachi no Koshien was filmed in Shikokuchūō. The movie is about a high school calligraphy club which prepares to compete in the "Shodo Girls Koshien"—a performance calligraphy event involving teams drawing on 10m x 12m sheets of paper while performing to music. Shodo Girls is based on a true story.

== Notable people from Shikokuchūō ==
- Ken Kamakura, baseball player
- Syukuro Manabe, meteorologist
- Minoru Shiraishi, voice actor
- Yoshikazu Shirakawa, photographer
- Kiyonori Sokabe, trumpeter
- Kumiko Takahashi, drummer (chatmonchy)
