= Niihama =

Niihama 新居浜市
- City
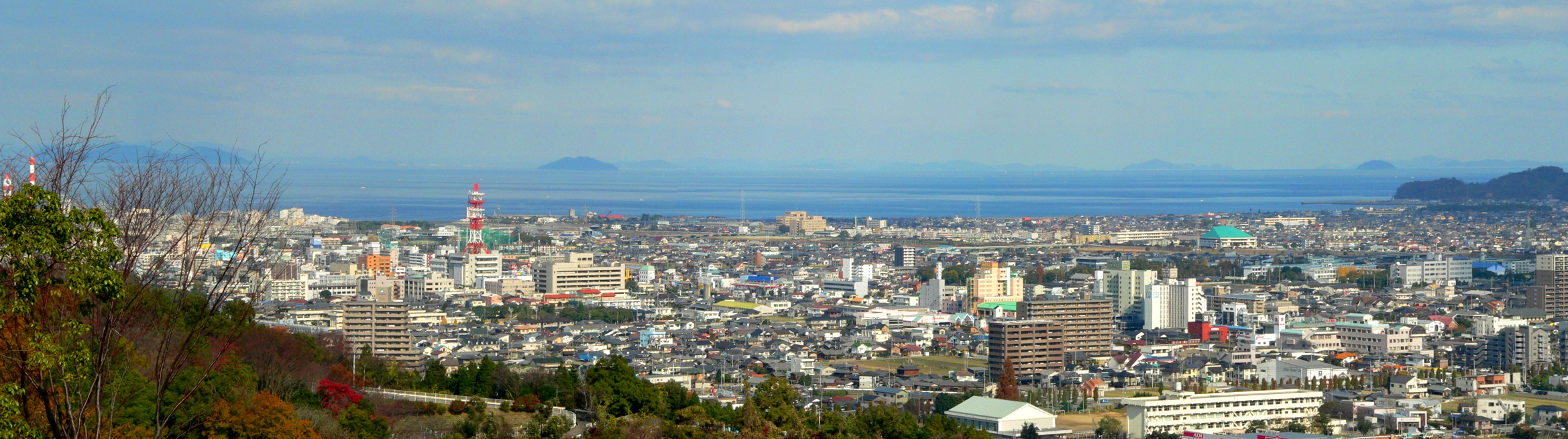
- Downtown Niihama and Seto Inner Sea

- Flag Seal
- Location of Niihama in Ehime Prefecture

- Location in Japan
- Coordinates: 33°58′N 133°17′E
- Country: Japan
- Region: Shikoku
- Prefecture: Ehime

Government
  - Mayor: Takuya Furukawa (since November 2024)

Area
  - Total: 234.50 km^{2} (90.54 sq mi)

Population (July 31, 2022)
  - Total: 115,824
  - Density: 493.92/km^{2} (1,279.2/sq mi)
- Time zone: UTC+09:00 (JST)
- City hall address: 1-5-1 Ikkuchō, Niihama-shi, Ehime-ken 792-8585
- Website: Official website
- Symbols
- Flower: Azalea
- Tree: Camphor laurel

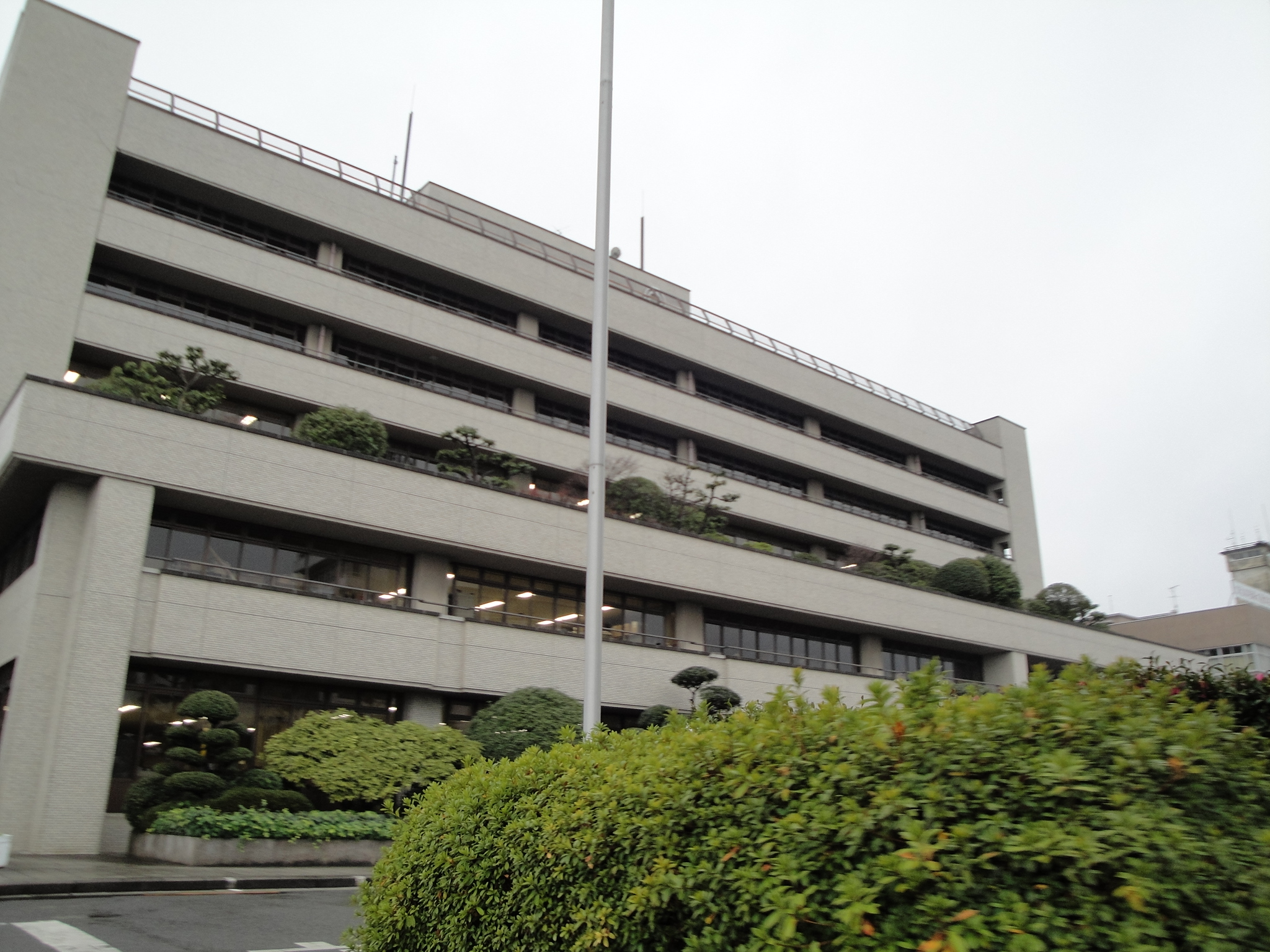
Niihama City Hall

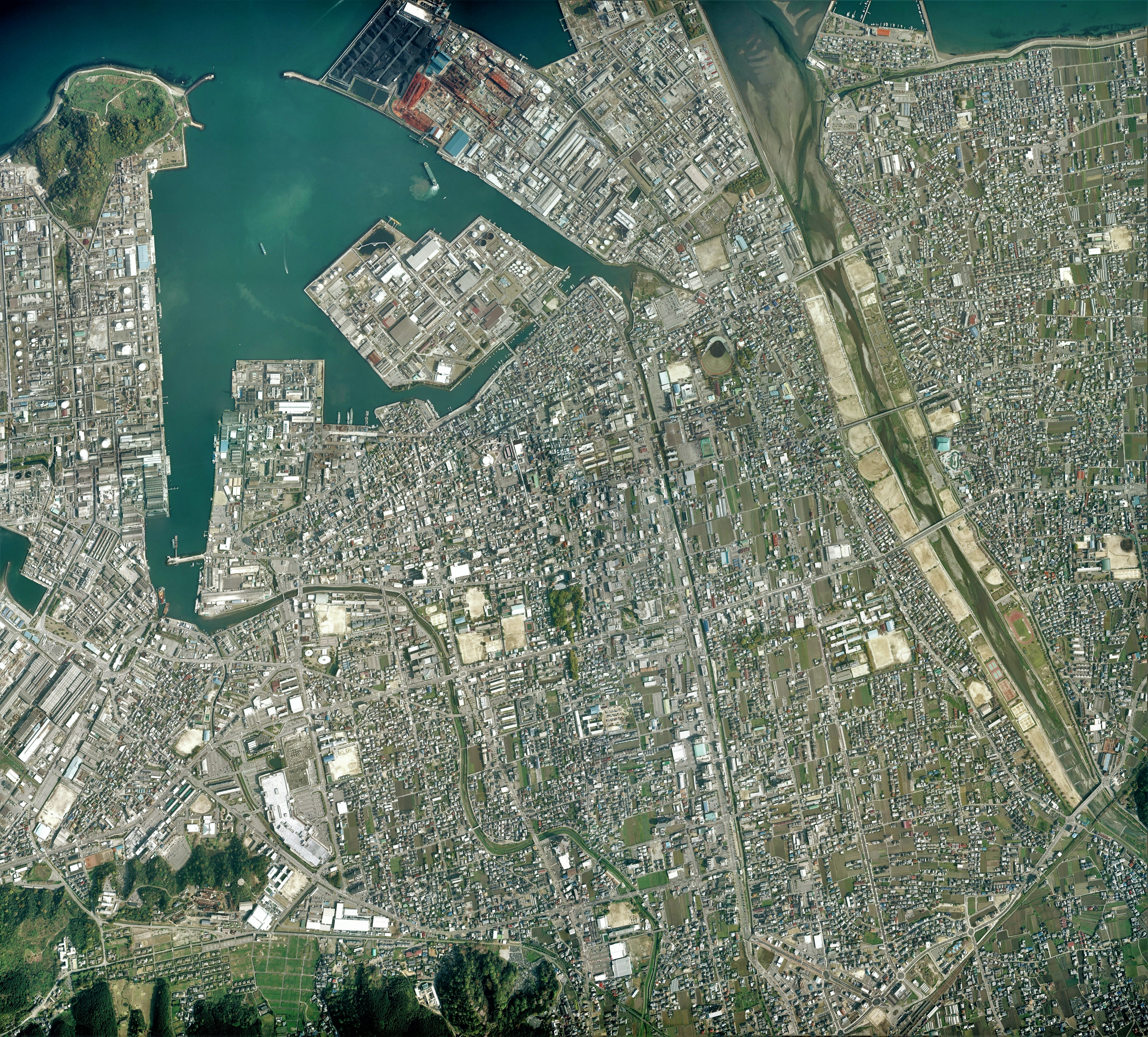
Aerial View of Central Niihama

Niihama (新居浜市, Niihama-shi) is a city located in the eastern part of Ehime Prefecture, Japan. As of 31 July 2022, the city had an estimated population of 115,824 in 57,781 households and a population density of 490 persons per km^{2}. The total area of the city is 234.50 square kilometres (90.54 sq mi). It has the third largest population in Ehime, behind the prefectural capital of Matsuyama and the recently expanded city of Imabari. It is famous for its Besshi copper mine as well as the annual Niihama Taiko Festival (also known as "The Man Festival", otokomatsuri 男祭り) that is the center of annual drunken and boisterous activity and draws tourists from around the country.

== Geography ==
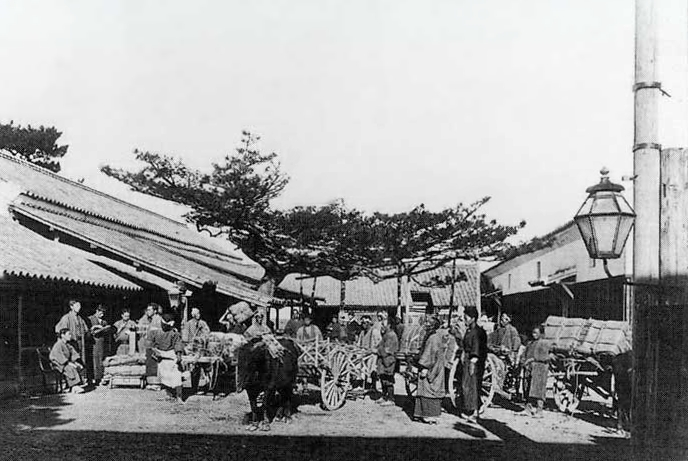
View of Kuchiya in Niihama in 1881

Niihama is positioned in the north-center area of the island of Shikoku, in the eastern part of Ehime Prefecture. Niihama is enveloped by mountains to the south and east, hills to the west, and the Seto Inland Sea to the north. The Kokuryo River flows from the mountains to the Seto Inland Sea and divides the city into an areas east of the river (kawahigashi) and west of the river (kawanishi). Being surrounded by mountains, Niihama feels geographically isolated from its closest neighbors, Saijō to the west and Shikokuchūō to the east. The border with Kōchi Prefecture lies in the mountains far south of the center of town. The island of Ōshima, northeast of the main part of the city, also is part of Niihama. The largely mountainous village of Besshi joined the city of Niihama in 2003 greatly increasing the size of the city.

=== Neighbouring municipalities ===
Ehime Prefecture

- Saijō
- Shikokuchūō

Kōchi Prefecture

- Ino
- Ōkawa

=== Climate ===
Niihama has a humid subtropical climate (Köppen Cfa) characterized by warm summers and cool winters with light snowfall. The average annual temperature in Niihama is 13.2 °C. The average annual rainfall is 1839 mm with September as the wettest month. The temperatures are highest on average in August, at around 24.4 °C, and lowest in January, at around 2.0 °C.

Climate data for Niihama (1981–2010 normals)
Month	Jan	Feb	Mar	Apr	May	Jun	Jul	Aug	Sep	Oct	Nov	Dec	Year
Record high °C (°F)	18.4 (65.1)	20.7 (69.3)	24.6 (76.3)	31.0 (87.8)	32.3 (90.1)	35.7 (96.3)	38.5 (101.3)	38.3 (100.9)	36.3 (97.3)	31.6 (88.9)	24.7 (76.5)	20.4 (68.7)	38.5 (101.3)
Mean daily maximum °C (°F)	9.5 (49.1)	10.1 (50.2)	13.3 (55.9)	19.1 (66.4)	23.7 (74.7)	26.9 (80.4)	31.0 (87.8)	32.2 (90.0)	28.2 (82.8)	22.6 (72.7)	17.1 (62.8)	12.2 (54.0)	32.2 (90.0)
Mean daily minimum °C (°F)	2.8 (37.0)	2.9 (37.2)	5.3 (41.5)	10.1 (50.2)	14.9 (58.8)	19.4 (66.9)	23.6 (74.5)	24.5 (76.1)	21.1 (70.0)	15.2 (59.4)	9.7 (49.5)	5.1 (41.2)	12.9 (55.2)
Record low °C (°F)	−3.4 (25.9)	−5.9 (21.4)	−3.1 (26.4)	1.6 (34.9)	6.4 (43.5)	11.6 (52.9)	17.3 (63.1)	19.5 (67.1)	11.6 (52.9)	7.4 (45.3)	2.9 (37.2)	−1.7 (28.9)	−5.9 (21.4)
Average precipitation mm (inches)	41.2 (1.62)	51.9 (2.04)	89.7 (3.53)	86.4 (3.40)	118.0 (4.65)	173.3 (6.82)	170.9 (6.73)	141.6 (5.57)	199.0 (7.83)	123.7 (4.87)	66.3 (2.61)	39.0 (1.54)	1,305.3 (51.39)
Mean monthly sunshine hours	124.6	133.7	164.6	185.1	189.0	139.4	179.3	204.2	147.7	157.1	134.2	130.0	1,888.9
Source: Japan Meteorological Agency

== Demographics ==
Per Japanese census data, the population of Niihama peaked around the year 1980 and has decreased slightly in the decades since.

Historical population
Year	Pop.	±%
1920	49,414	—
1930	61,406	+24.3%
1940	88,639	+44.3%
1950	88,639	+0.0%
1960	117,317	+32.4%
1970	126,992	+8.2%
1980	132,736	+4.5%
1990	129,467	−2.5%
2000	125,814	−2.8%
2010	121,735	−3.2%
2020	115,938	−4.8%

== History ==
Niihama is located in ancient Iyo Province and has been inhabited since prehistoric times. Under the Edo Period Tokugawa shogunate, it was largely administered as part of Saijō Domain or Komatsu Domain. The Besshi Copper Mine was opened in 1744. The village of Niihama was established with the post-Meiji restoration creation of the modern municipalities system on December 15, 1889. It was raised to town status on January 1, 1908. On November 3, 1937, Niihama merged with the villages of Kaneko and Takatsu to form the city of Niihama. .

== Government ==
Niihama has a mayor-council form of government with a directly elected mayor and a unicameral city council of 26 members. Niihama contributes four members to the Ehime Prefectural Assembly.

In terms of national politics, Niihama is part of Ehime 2nd district of the lower house of the Diet of Japan. Prior to 2022, the city was part of Ehime 3rd district.

== Economy ==
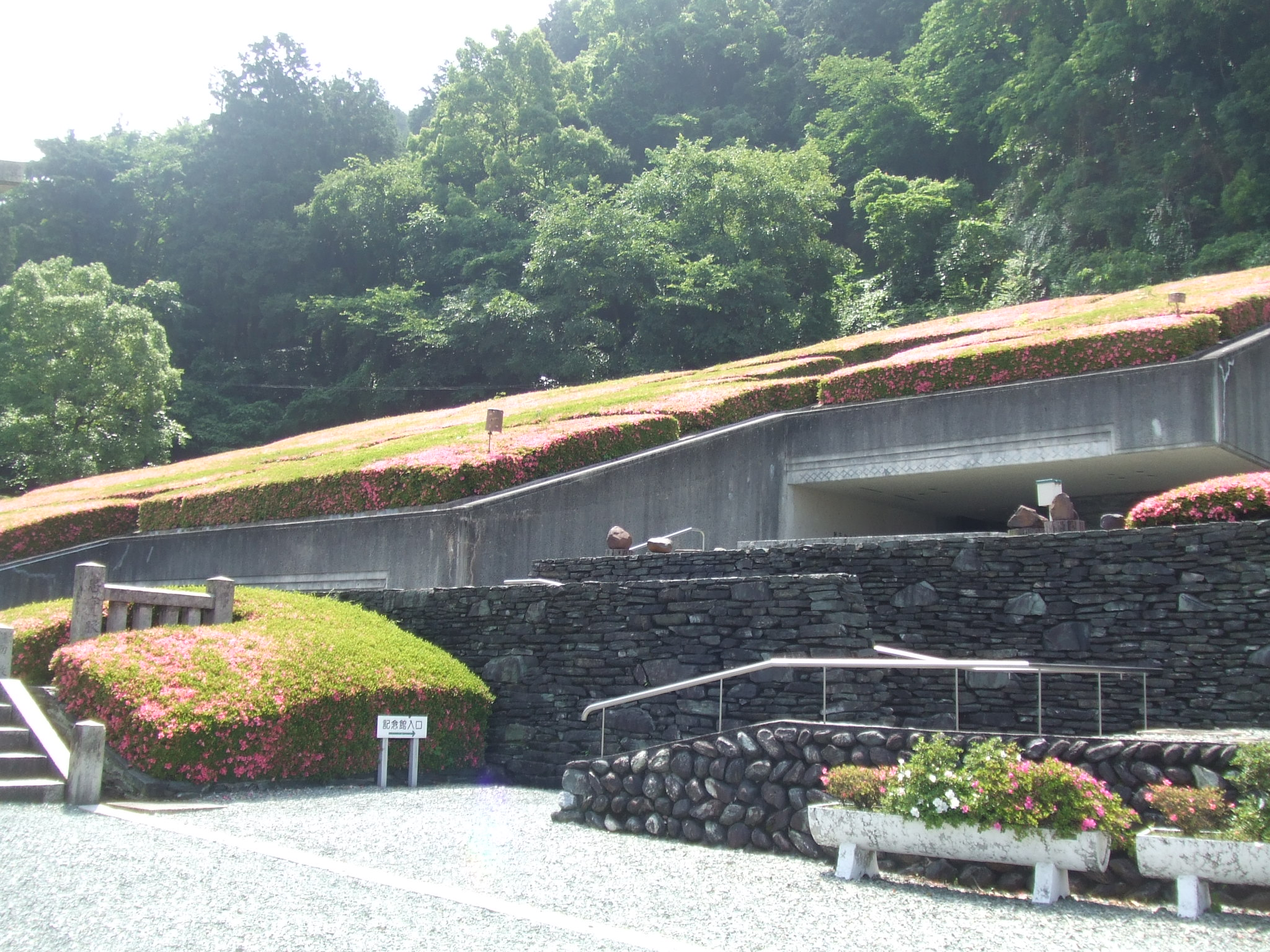
Besshi Copper-mine Memorial Museum

The Besshi copper mine (once considered to be one of the most productive in the world) jump-started the Sumitomo zaibatsu. Even though the mine has since closed (its legacy is now preserved in a small museum and onsen attraction, Minetopia Besshi), Sumitomo remains a large presence in town. The economy of Niihama is supported largely by factories as well as activities at its ports.

== Education ==
Niihama has 17 public elementary schools and 12 public middle schools operated by the city government. The city has five public high schools operated by the Ehime Prefectural Board of Education. The Niihama National College of Technology is a technology college in Niihama.

== Transportation ==
=== Railways ===
Shikoku Railway Company - Yosan Line

- Takihama - Niihama - Nakahagi

=== Highways ===
- Matsuyama Expressway
- National Route 11
- National Route 192

=== Ports ===
- Port of Niihama

== Sister cities ==
- Dezhou, Shandong, China, friendship city since November 1997

== Festivals and celebrations ==
=== Taiko Festival ===
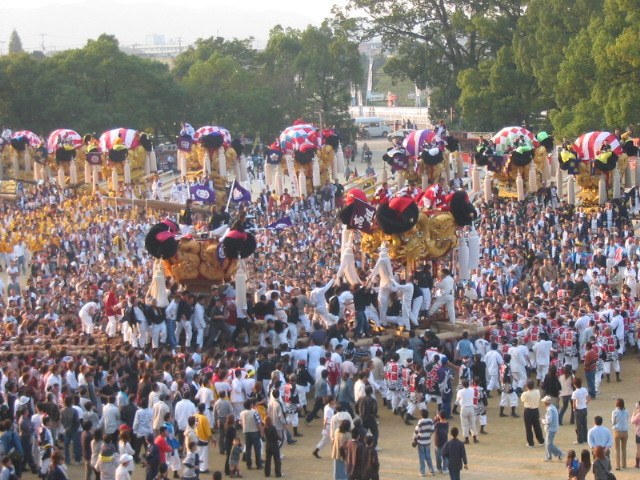
Two Taiko floats ram each other in battle in Niihama's Yamane Park during the Taiko Festival in October, 2004.

The Niihama Taiko Festival is a harvest festival held over 16–18 October each year. Each of 50 neighborhoods in Niihama has its own Taiko float, which consists of an ornately decorated wooden center frame, covered in panels made of gold thread (three to a side). The column is covered with a fabric top (usually red and white), which symbolically represents the sun; it is surrounded by long black cushions folded into a figure of 8 with hanging tassels, representing the clouds and rain. The design is intended to show gratitude for a good harvest. Gold dragons adorn the top panels of the float while the lower panels show traditional buildings, animals or legends. Inside the float, a drummer beats a deep booming taiko drum, providing the rhythm that guides 150 men below, who carry the float by four long wooden beams at the float's base. Four crew members stand on the beams and control the rest of the crew with flags, whistles and chants while four more are perched precariously on the top some 5.4 m above ground.

The floats weigh over two and a half tons and can cost over $100,000US to build (collected by donations within the local area). Men and boys as young as 16 begin the festival before sunrise on its first day by carrying the floats to their local shrine for a blessing by shinto priests. The most spectacular of these happens at Utsunomiya Jinja near Yamane Ground where several floats are carried up many steps at about 4am to a small shrine on the top of a hill. For three days straight (October 16–18), 12 to 14 hours per day, they carry the floats in parades all over the city and park them for display, drinking copious amounts of sake. Sake bottlers even release commemorative bottles with labels featuring pictures of various float-carrying teams.

The main events include a display of the Taiko floats in Yamane Park, Takihama Station, Kasenjiki Park, Shinto shrines across the city and at several Supermarket and shopping complexes (Jusco, Fuji Grand, M2, Co-op). On alternate years there is the spectacle of eight taikodai (floats) being loaded onto barges to travel to another location by sea. The Taiko-carrying teams are known to start fights, in which two teams ram their floats into each other until one or both floats are destroyed.

== Local attractions ==
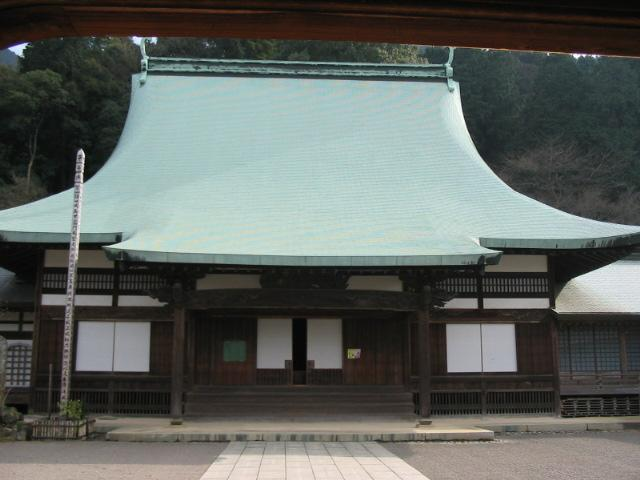
The main temple at Zuiō-ji

=== Zuiō-ji Temple ===
Zuiō-ji is a Sōtō Zen temple at the edge of the mountains in south Niihama. It welcomes foreign visitors to participate in a Sunday morning zazen meditation session, or even to stay overnight. It is the largest Buddhist temple in Niihama.

=== Waterfalls ===
The mountainous area between Niihama and the village of Besshi includes two major waterfalls: Chōshi no Taki and Mato no Taki (Waterfall at the Demon's Door).

=== Otedama ===
Niihama is home to the national headquarters of the Otedama no Kai (お手玉の会, Traditional Japanese Juggling Association).

=== Planetarium ===
Niihama was home to the world's largest planetarium until the renovation of the Nagoya City Science Museum in March 2011.

== Notable people from Niihama ==
- Shoji Kokami, playwright, director, actor, and filmmaker
- Nana Mizuki, Japanese voice actress and singer
