= Lilliana Owens =

American historian, writer, educator and Catholic nun (1898–1992)

Lilliana M. Owens SL (May 13, 1898 - September 27, 1992) was an American historian, writer, educator and Catholic nun. She was known for her historical writing and her Catholic comic books.

== Biography ==
Owens was born in St. Paul, Minnesota on May 13, 1898. She attended St. Francis High School in St. Paul, Kansas. She went on to become a Sister of Loretto on December 8, 1917. Owens earned a bachelor's degree from Loretto Heights College and a master's degree from St. Louis University. Later, she received a doctorate in history from the St. Louis University. She worked at the Immaculate Conception High School in East Las Vegas, New Mexico in the 1940s. In the 1950s, she was working as a librarian for Loretto Academy in the Bennett Library. She also worked as an associate editor for Revista Católica.

Owens died at the Loretto Mother House Infirmary in Nerinx, Kentucky on September 27, 1992.

== Writing ==
Owens began writing Catholic comic books in the 1940s. Her comic, Nerinckx and the Sisters of Loretto at the Foot of the Cross, published by Topix comics in 1947, was successful enough to lead to the production of more comics about the Sisters of Loretto. In 1948, Topix also published her story about the Sisters of Loretto and the Louisville flood of 1937, and also published Loretto, the Monument of Nerinck.

In the early 1950s, Owens worked on a collection of volumes about Catholic scholars in the Southwest United States called "Jesuit Studies--Southwest." The volume on Bishop Anthony J. Schuler was considered by New Mexico Historical Review to be well researched. The book was also lauded by Cardinal Eugène Tisserant.

Owens published Loretto in Missouri in 1965, which is a history of the Sisters of Loretto in the state and was her eleventh historical piece of nonfiction.

== Selected bibliography ==
- Nerinckx and the Sisters of Loretto at the Foot of the Cross (PDF). Topix. 1947.
- Sister Mary Nerinckx and the Blessed Sacrament (PDF). Topix. 1948.
- Jesuit Beginnings in New Mexico, 1867-1882. Revista Catholica Press. 1950. OCLC 655868916.
- Reverend Carlos M. Pinto, S.J.: Apostle of El Paso, 1892-1919. Revista Catholica Press. 1951. OCLC 3122959.
- Most Rev. Anthony J. Schuler, First Bishop of El Paso, and Some Catholic Activities in the Diocese Between 1915-1942. Revista Catolica Press. 1953. OCLC 2650717.
- Loretto in Missouri. B. Herder. 1965. OCLC 2848144.
- Loretto on the Old Frontier, 1823-1864. Khoury Bros., Inc. 1965. OCLC 6216574.
