= Kurita =

Kurita may refer to:

== People ==
- Kurita Chodō (1749–1814), Japanese poet of the Edo period
- Eiji Kurita (born 1938), Japanese cross-country skier
- Genzo Kurita (1926–1959), Japanese serial killer
- Kanichi Kurita (born 1958), Japanese actor and comedian
- M. Sue Kurita, American judge
- Mark Ajay Kurita (born 1998), Japanese footballer
- Naoki Kurita (born 1971), Japanese sport shooter
- Rosalind Kurita (fl. from 1996), American politician
- Shigetaka Kurita (born 1972), Japanese interface designer
- Taijiro Kurita (born 1975), Japanese footballer
- Takeo Kurita (1889–1977), vice admiral in the Imperial Japanese Navy during World War II
- Toyomichi Kurita (born 1950), Japanese cinematographer

== Other uses ==
- Kurita District, Shiga, a place in Japan
- Kurita Water Industries, a Japanese company
- Ryokan Kurita, a fictional character in Eyeshield 21
- Yūko Kurita, a fictional character in Oishinbo
- House Kurita, a dynastic ruling family in the fictional setting of the tabletop wargaming franchise BattleTech
