= List of presidents of Webster University =

This article is a list of presidents of Webster University (previously Loretto College in the 1920s and Webster College until the 1980s).

No.	Name	Term start	Term end
1	M. Dolorine Powers, SL	1916	1919
2	M. Edith Loughran, SL	1919	1925
3	M. Linus Maier, SL	1925	1931
4	George Donovan	1931	1950
5	Mariella Collins, SL	1950	1958
6	Francetta Barberis, SL	1958	1965
7	Jacqueline Grennan Wexler	1965	1969
8	Leigh Gerdine	1970	1990
9	Daniel H. Perlman	1990	1994
10	Richard S. Meyers	1994	2008
11	Elizabeth Stroble	2009	
