= Loretto Academy (El Paso, Texas) =

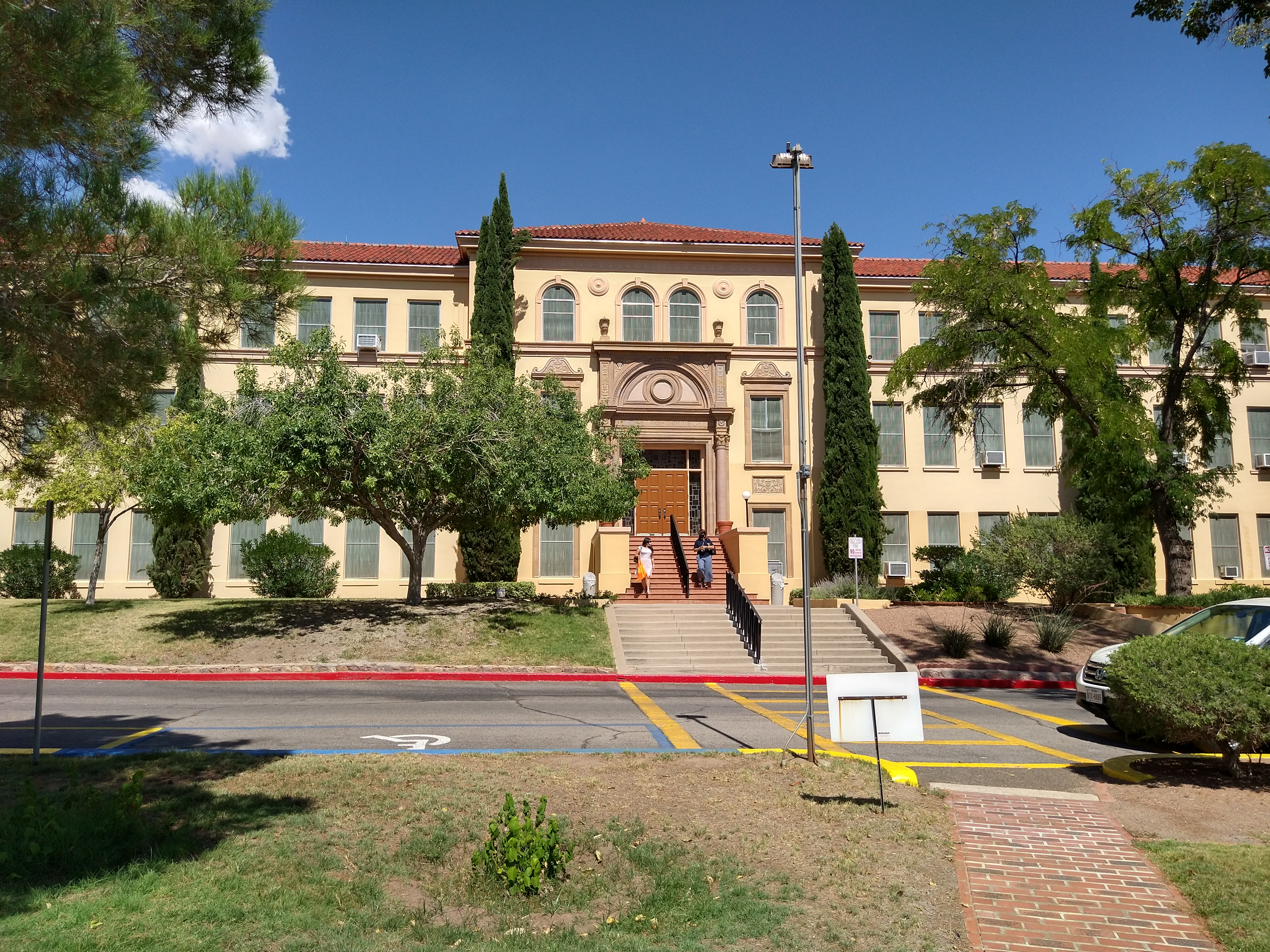

Location
- 1300 Hardaway Street; El Paso, (El Paso County), Texas 79903; United States; 31°47′10″N 106°26′5″W

Information
- Type: Private, All-Girls for grades 6-12
- Motto: A Tradition Of Excellence/ Let Loretto Be Loretto Forever
- Religious affiliation: Roman Catholic
- Established: 1923
- Founder: Mother M. Praxedes Carty
- President: Nicole Ortega Cobb
- Principal: High School: Homero Silva; Middle School: Mary Ann Olivas
- Grades: Pre-K–12 (Boys PreK-5, girls all grades)
- Colors: Yellow, Black and White
- Slogan: Four Core Values: Faith, Community, Justice & Respect
- Mascot: Angels
- Accreditation: Southern Association of Colleges and Schools
- Newspaper: The Prax
- Affiliation: Sisters of Loretto
- Elementary Principal: Norma Lopez
- Athletic Director: Angela Glover
- Architects: Trost & Trost
- Website: http://www.loretto.org

Loretto Academy is a private Roman Catholic school in El Paso, Texas. It was opened in 1923 and was founded by Mother M. Praxedes Carty. is a part of the Roman Catholic Diocese of El Paso. Grades Pre-K3-5 are coeducational, while grades 6-12 are all girls.

== Background ==
The Sisters of Loretto had previously established several schools in Las Cruces and El Paso. In the early 1920s, Mother M. Praxedes Carty of the Sisters of Loretto came to El Paso to establish a new school. On March 20, 1922, she purchased 19 acres of land in the Austin Terrace area, which was considered a bad place to put the school. The area was open desert on a hilltop and was accessible by streetcar. For the time period, it was considered to be a long distance from the downtown area. Because of the location, people were unsure if parents would send their children to the school. People began to call the project "Praxedes' Folly."

The building was designed by Trost & Trost. Gustavus A. Trost was friends with Mother Praxedes and may have done most of the primary architectural drawings. The buildings were "designed to face Mexico" in a welcoming gesture for all people to join the community. They were built using stuccoed brick and red Spanish tile on the roof. The first building was started in the fall of 1922. The cornerstone for the chapel was laid down on March 20, 1924. The entire campus was not complete until the 1930s. However, the first school building was ready in 1923. Loretto Academy in El Paso opened on September 11, 1923 with 186 students, of which 20 lived at the school as boarders. In 1928, the Southern Association of Colleges and Secondary Schools admitted Loretto as a member.

The boarding school closed in 1975. Students from Ciudad Juarez also attend the school. As of the early 1990s the school had over 900 students.

After 22 years, in 2022, Sister Mary E. "Buffy" Boesen stepped down as president of Loretto. Loretto alumna, Nicole Ortega Cobb, became the next president of the school in June 2022.

== Notable attendees ==
- Patricia Roybal Caballero.
- Michelle Dipp.
- Veronica Escobar
- Mago Orona Gándara.
- Mary Helen Garcia.
- Alicia Gaspar de Alba.
- Maria-Elena Giner
- Amirah Kassem.
- M. Sue Kurita.
- Karla Martínez de Salas.
- Maureen McDonnell.
- Pat Mora.
- Stevie Nicks.
- Angelica Rosales.
- Andi Teran.
- María Guillermina Valdes Villalva.

== Notable faculty ==
- Lilliana Owens.
- Jacqueline Grennan Wexler.

== Notes and references ==
=== Sources ===
- Loretto Academy (2010). Loretto Academy Alumnae Directory 2010. El Paso, Texas: Harris Connect.
