= Charles Nerinckx =

Catholic missionary priest

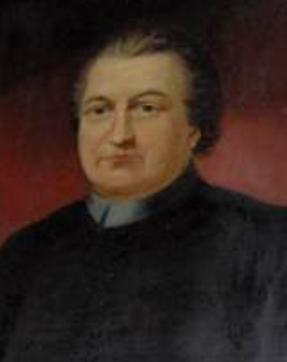
Charles Nerinckx, contemporary portrait

Charles Nerinckx (2 October 1761, Herfelingen – 12 August 1824) was a Catholic missionary priest who migrated from what is now Belgium to work in Kentucky. He founded fourteen churches and the Sisters of Loretto. Nerinckx became known as "the Apostle of Kentucky."

== Early life and education ==
The son of Dr. Sebastian and Petronilla Langendries Nerinckx, Charles Nerinckx was born 2 October 1761 in Herfelingen, Flemish Brabant, the eldest of fourteen children. Nerinckx was educated at the University of Leuven and, upon completion of his theological training at the Major Seminary, Mechelen, was ordained a priest in 1785.

He became vicar at the cathedral of Mechelen, where he was noted for his zeal among the working classes. In 1794 he obtained the pastoral charge of Everberg-Meerbeek (today part of the municipality of Kortenberg). When the army of the French Republic invaded Belgium in 1797, it persecuted Catholic priests in a move to decrease the power of the Church, as it had in France. An order for Nerinckx's arrest was issued, and the priest went into hiding for the next four years. He fled in disguise to the city of Dendermonde and hid in the chapel of St. Blase, where he served as chaplain to the nuns at the hospital.

With his name listed as a fugitive from justice, returning to his parish was impossible and Nerinckx decided to emigrate to America. He wrote to Bishop John Carroll offering his services for the American mission. His letter was accompanied by a recommendation from Adelheid Amalie Gallitzin, mother of Demetrius Augustine Gallitzin, who was already serving as a missionary in the Alleghenies. Receiving a favorable reply, he set out; the voyage from Amsterdam to Baltimore took three months.

== America ==
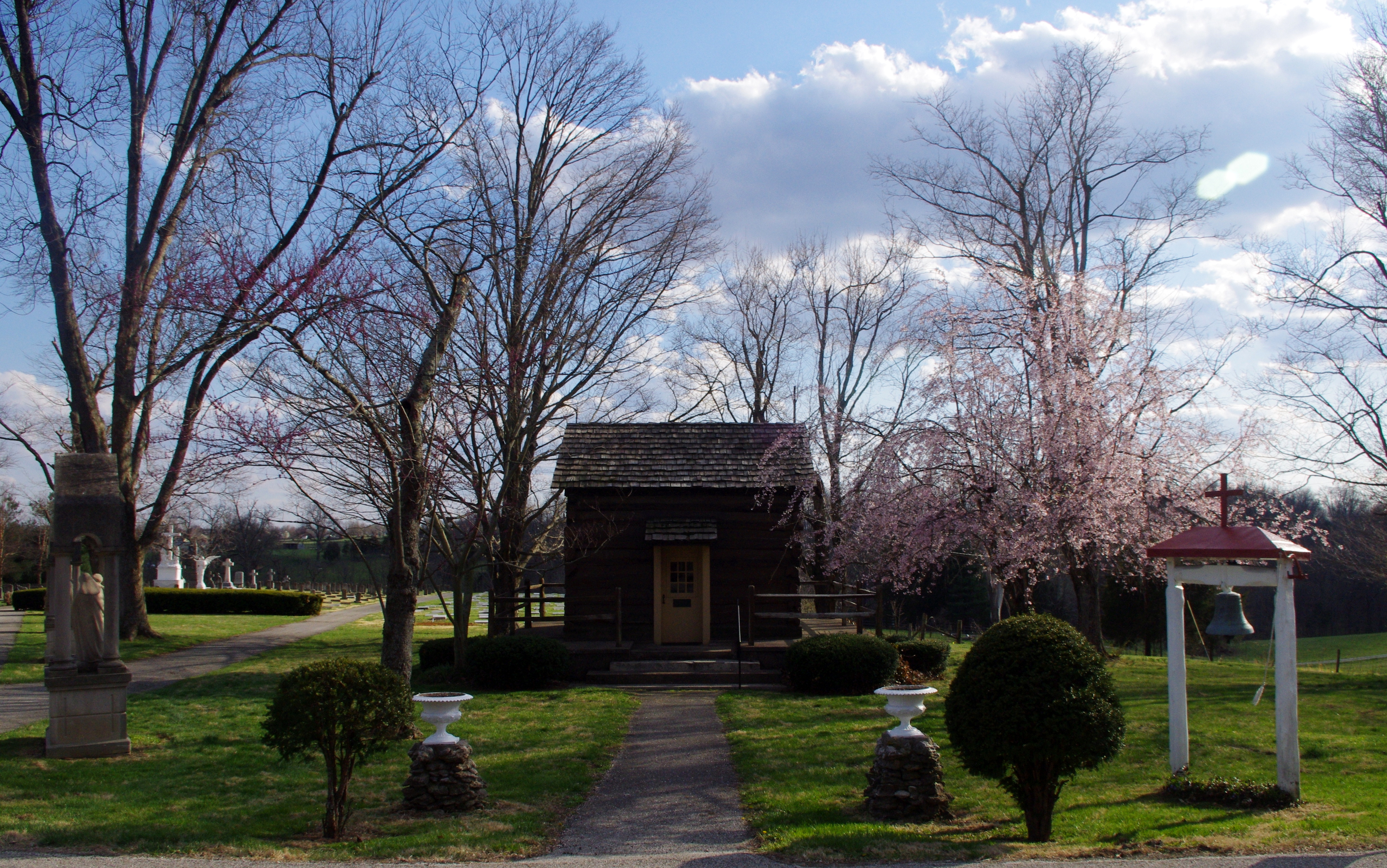
Father Charles Nerinckx's cabin at the Loretto Motherhouse in Nerinx, Kentucky

Nerinckx immigrated to the United States in 1804. After spending some months at Georgetown College, he was assigned by Bishop John Carroll to assist Stephen Badin, the only priest in Kentucky. In July 1805, he joined Badin at St. Stephen's Farm, thirteen miles (21 km) from Bardstown and three miles from Holy Cross Church, the first Catholic church built in the state of Kentucky. He remained there for seven years and was then given charge of the settlements east of St. Stephen's.The district given to his charge was over two hundred miles in length and covered nearly half the state. Often he was known to ride twenty-five or thirty miles (40 or 48 km) fasting in order to be able to say Mass.

Nerinckx organized new congregations and oversaw the building of churches. Friends and supporters in Belgium sent him church goods, seeds, and plants. Word of Nerinckx's efforts reached the Holy See and in 1808, the Pope sought to appoint him Bishop of New Orleans, but Nerinckx refused the honor. Soon after the arrival of Bishop Flaget in Bardstown, in June, 1811, a conference of the five secular and four Dominican priests serving in Kentucky was held for the purpose of distributing diocese territory into missionary districts. Nerinckx was assigned practically half the state, with residence at St. Charles in a little one room log cabin,.

With a focus on Catholic education, Nerinckx founded the Loretto Sisters as a teaching order in 1812. It was formally designated the Friends of Mary at the Foot of the Cross. Nerinckx was known to have bought at least one African American from the sisters. During a trip to Europe to obtain supplies, he persuaded Pierre-Jean De Smet to join the American mission.

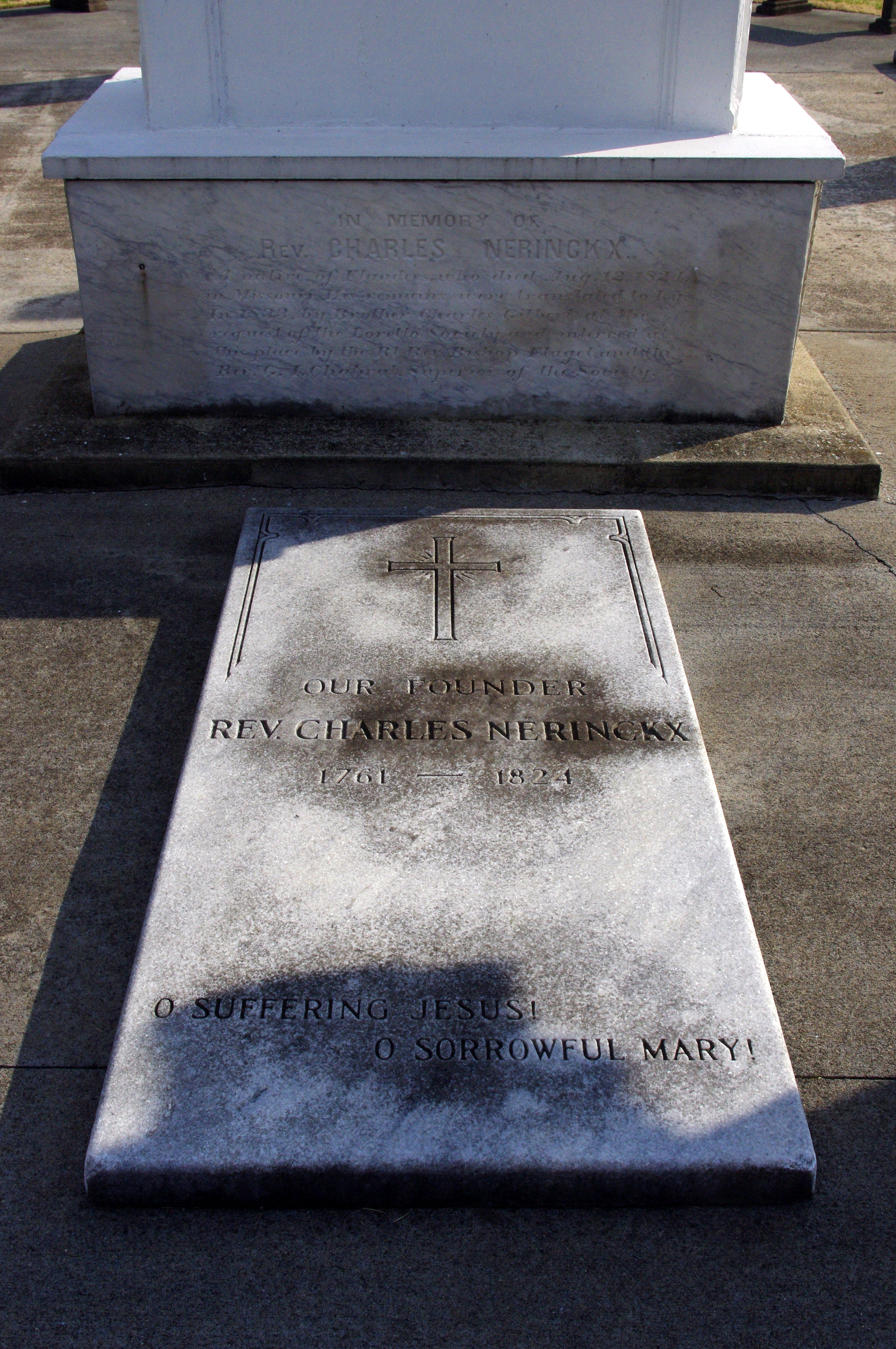
Father Charles Nerinckx's grave at the Loretto Motherhouse in Nerinx, Kentucky

Nerinckx died at Ste. Genevieve, Missouri, on 12 August 1824.

== Legacy and honors ==
Nerinx Hall, a private secondary school for girls, was founded by the Sisters of Loretto in 1924 in Webster Groves, Missouri, and named in honor of Nerinckx.
