= List of historic sites of Japan (Ehime) =

This list is of the historic sites of Japan located within the Prefecture of Ehime.

== National Historic Sites ==
As of 1 October 2024, eighteen Sites have been designated as being of national significance.

Site	Municipality	Comments	Image	Coordinates	Type	Ref.
Iyo Kokubun-ji Pagoda Site 伊予国分寺塔跡; Iyo Kokubunji tō ato	Imabari	Nara period provincial temple of Iyo Province; 59th temple of the Shikoku pilgrimage		34°01′33″N 133°01′37″E	3	
Umamukaiyama Kofun 宇摩向山古墳; Umamukaiyama kofun	Shikokuchūō	Kofun period tumulus		34°00′24″N 133°35′05″E	1	
Uwajima Castle 宇和島城; Uwajima-jō	Uwajima	Edo Period castle		33°13′11″N 132°33′54″E	2	
Einōsan Castle ruins 永納山城跡; Einōsan-jō ato	Saijō	Asuka period fortification ruins		33°58′38″N 133°03′15″E	2	
Kagomori Castle ruins 川後森城跡; Kagomori-jō ato	Matsuno	Sengoku period castle ruins		33°13′25″N 132°42′34″E	2	
Kume Kanga sites 久米官衙遺跡群; Kume Kanga iseki-gun	Matsuyama	Nara period local administration complex ruins		33°48′37″N 132°48′05″E	2, 3	
Matsuyama Castle 松山城跡; Matsuyama-jō ato	Matsuyama	Edo Period castle		33°50′44″N 132°45′56″E	2	
Kamikuroiwaiwakage Site 上黒岩岩陰遺跡; Kamikuroiwaiwakage iseki	Kumakōgen	Jōmon period rock shelter		33°37′04″N 132°57′37″E	1	
Yuzuki Castle ruins 湯築城跡; Yuzuki-jō ato	Matsuyama	Muromachi period castle ruins		33°50′53″N 132°47′13″E	2	
Tōmyō-ji former precinct 等妙寺旧境内; Tōmyōji kyū-keidai	Kihoku	C14 Tendai temple burned in 1588		33°13′50″N 132°40′31″E	3	
Noshima Castle ruins 能島城跡; Noshima-jō ato	Imabari	Sengoku period castle ruins on the island of Noshima		34°10′58″N 133°04′51″E	2	
Hōan-ji temple ruins 法安寺跡; Hōanji ato	Saijō	late Asuka or early Nara-period temple		33°53′59″N 133°05′23″E	3	
Myōkensan Kofun 妙見山古墳; Myōkensan kofun	Imabari	Kofun period tumulus		34°03′31″N 132°55′51″E	1	
Hasaike Kofun 葉佐池古墳; Hasaike kofun	Matsuyama	Kofun period tumulus		33°48′52″N 132°50′51″E	1	
Iyo Henro-michi 伊予遍路道; Iyo henro-michi	Ainan, Saijō, Seiyo, Shikokuchūō, Uwajima	pilgrimage route; designation comprises Kanjizai-ji michi (観自在寺道), Inari Jinja precinct (稲荷神社境内), Ryūkō-ji precinct (龍光寺境内), Butsumoku-ji michi (仏木寺道), Meiseki-ji precinct (明石寺境内), Daihō-ji michi (大寶寺道), Yokomine-ji michi (横峰寺道), Yokomine-ji precinct (横峰寺境内), and Sankaku-ji Okunoin michi (三角寺奥之院道)		33°50′16″N 133°06′40″E	3, 6	
Yawatahama Kaidō Kasagi Pass 八幡浜街道笠置峠越; Yawatahama kaidō Kasagi tōge-goe	Seiyo, Yawatahama	Remnants of ancient road in use since Kofun period		33°50′16″N 133°06′40″E		
Yugeshima Shōen ruins 弓削島荘遺跡; Yuge-jima no shō iseki	Kamijima	Heian period shōen remnants		34°16′35″N 133°12′49″E		
Hirajō Shell Mound 平城貝塚; Hirajō kaizuka	Ainan			32°57′46″N 132°33′53″E		

== Prefectural Historic Sites ==
As of 1 May 2024, fifty Sites have been designated as being of prefectural importance.

Site	Municipality	Comments	Image	Coordinates	Type	Ref.
Shikidō and Maihatsutō 子規堂 (附埋髪塔); Shikidō tsuketari Maihatsutō	Matsuyama	former residence of Masaoka Shiki		33°50′06″N 132°45′48″E		
Kōshin-an 庚申庵; Kōshin-an	Matsuyama	former residence of Kurita Chodō		33°50′37″N 132°45′17″E		
Ippen Shōnin Birthplace 一遍上人の誕生地; Ippen Shōnin no tanjō-chi	Matsuyama	at Hōgon-ji		33°51′06″N 132°47′23″E		
Ebara Castle Site 荏原城跡; Ebara-jō seki	Matsuyama			33°45′58″N 132°48′45″E		
Matsudaira Sadayuki Mausoleum 松平定行の霊廟; Matsudaira Sadayuki no reibyō	Matsuyama	at Jōshin-ji (常信寺)		33°51′25″N 132°47′03″E		
Adachi Shigenobu Grave 足立重信の墓; Adachi Shigenobu no haka	Matsuyama			33°51′22″N 132°45′58″E		
Aochi Rinsō Grave 青地林宗の墓; Aochi Rinsō no haka	Matsuyama			33°51′21″N 132°45′58″E		
Kagiya Kana Grave 鍵谷カナの墓; Kagiya Kana no haka	Matsuyama			33°48′49″N 132°42′11″E		
Matsudaira Sadamasa Mausoleum 松平定政の霊廟; Matsudaira Sadamasa no reibyō	Matsuyama	at Jōshin-ji (常信寺)		33°51′25″N 132°47′03″E		
Kikuya Shinsuke Grave 菊屋新助の墓; Kikuya Shinsuke no haka	Matsuyama			33°50′57″N 132°45′37″E		
Kyōsekizan Kofun 経石山古墳; Kyōsekizan kofun	Matsuyama			33°49′50″N 132°47′38″E		
Higashino Ochaya Site 東野お茶屋跡; Higashino ochaya ato	Matsuyama			33°50′27″N 132°48′13″E		
Agata Shell Mound 阿方貝塚; Agata kaizuka	Imabari			34°03′48″N 132°58′22″E		
Hidaka Kujirayama Kofun 日高鯨山の古墳; Hidaka Kujirayama no kofun	Imabari			34°03′30″N 132°58′59″E		
Imabari Castle Site 今治城跡; Imabari-jō seki	Imabari			34°03′47″N 133°00′25″E		
Iyo Kokubunni-ji Pagoda Site 伊予国分尼寺塔跡; Iyo Kokubunniji tō ato	Imabari	provincial nunnery of Iyo Province		34°00′48″N 133°02′02″E		
Imabari Domain Lords' Graves 今治藩主の墓; Imabari-han-shu no haka	Imabari			34°01′47″N 133°02′07″E		
Date Hidemune Grave 伊達秀宗の墓; Date Hidemune no haka	Uwajima	at Tōgaku-ji (等覚寺)		33°13′01″N 132°34′26″E		
Date Munenari and his Wife's Graves 伊達宗城及び夫人の墓; Date Munenari oyobi fujin no haka	Uwajima	at Tōgaku-ji (等覚寺)		33°13′01″N 132°34′26″E		
Besshi Copper Mine Kuchiya Site 別子銅山口屋跡; Besshi dōzan kuchiya ato	Niihama			33°58′06″N 133°16′29″E		
Doigamae Site 土居構跡; Doigamae ato	Saijō			33°53′48″N 133°11′10″E		
Nakae Tōju Residence Site 中江藤樹の邸跡; Nakae Tōju no yashiki ato	Ōzu			33°30′23″N 132°32′21″E		
Ōzu Castle Site 大洲城跡; Ōzu-jō seki	Ōzu			33°30′34″N 132°32′28″E		
Kawada Yūkin Family Graves 川田雄琴一家の墓; Kawada Yūkin ikka no haka	Ōzu			33°30′13″N 132°32′51″E		
Asahiyama Kofun 朝日山古墳; Asahiyama kofun	Shikokuchūō			33°58′41″N 133°35′13″E		
Iyooka Kofun 伊予岡古墳; Iyooka kofun	Iyo			33°45′17″N 132°42′37″E		
Ichiba Tile Kiln Sites 市場かわらがはな古代窯跡群; Ichiba kawara ga hana kodai kama ato-gun	Iyo			33°44′00″N 132°41′47″E		
Nanba-Okutani Kofun 難波奥谷古墳; Nanba-Okutani kofun	Matsuyama			33°58′34″N 132°48′14″E		
Yokoyama Castle Site 横山城跡; Yokoyama-jō seki	Matsuyama			33°55′11″N 132°48′30″E		
Eryō Castle Site 恵良城跡; Eryō-jō seki	Matsuyama			33°59′31″N 132°47′59″E		
Ōzora-Takahara Kofun Cluster 大空・高原古墳群; Ōzora・Takahara kofun-gun	Shikokuchūō			33°57′36″N 133°28′01″E		
Kondō Tokuzan Former Residence 近藤篤山の旧邸; Kondō Tokuzan no kyū-tei	Saijō			33°53′37″N 133°07′01″E		
Funayama Kofun Cluster 船山古墳群; Funayama kofun-gun	Saijō			33°53′46″N 133°06′26″E		
Nonose Kofun 野々瀬の古墳; Nonose no kofun	Imabari			33°59′29″N 133°01′55″E		
Taki Jinja Kofun Cluster 多伎神社古墳群; Taki Jinja kofun-gun	Imabari			34°00′13″N 132°59′41″E		
Imo Jizō 甘藷地蔵; Imo Jizō	Imabari			34°13′42″N 133°02′59″E		
Amazaki Castle Site 甘崎城跡; Amazaki-jō seki	Imabari			34°14′40″N 133°03′23″E		
Kawakami Jinja Kofun 川上神社古墳; Kawakami Jinja kofun	Tōon			33°47′59″N 132°54′50″E		
Kōsaikyo 仰西渠; Kōsaikyo	Kumakōgen			33°40′16″N 132°53′32″E		
Ginō Sakubee Grave 義農作兵衛の墓; Ginō Sakubee no haka	Masaki			33°47′19″N 132°42′16″E		
Ōgeta Kofun Cluster 大下田古墳群; Ōgeta kofun-gun	Tobe			33°46′03″N 132°47′36″E		
Takano Chōei Retreat 高野長英の隠れ家; Takano Chōei no kakurega	Seiyo			33°21′45″N 132°30′52″E		
Senka Kōji Grave 泉貨居士の墓; Senka Kōji no haka	Seiyo			33°22′28″N 132°39′03″E		
Mitaki Castle Site 三滝城跡; Mitaki-jō seki	Seiyo			33°24′34″N 132°47′57″E		
Anagami Cave Site 穴神洞遺跡; Anagami-dō iseki	Seiyo			33°23′01″N 132°49′09″E		
Nakatsugawa Cave Site 中津川洞穴遺跡; Nakatsugawa dōketsu iseki	Seiyo			33°22′44″N 132°46′33″E		
Iwaya Site 岩谷遺跡; Iwaya iseki	Kihoku			33°15′49″N 132°42′37″E		
Hirajō Shell Mound 平城貝塚; Hirajō kaizuka	Ainan			32°57′56″N 132°33′06″E		
Takano Chōei Battery Site 高野長英築造の台場跡; Takano Chōei chikuzō no daiba ato	Ainan			32°56′04″N 132°33′56″E		
Kasagitōge Kofun 笠置峠古墳; Kasagitōge kofun	Seiyo			33°24′10″N 132°27′45″E		

== Municipal Historic Sites ==
As of 1 May 2024, a further three hundred and twenty-seven Sites have been designated as being of municipal importance.

== Registered Historic Sites ==
As of 1 October 2024, one Monument has been registered (as opposed to designated) as an Historic Site at a national level.

Site	Municipality	Comments	Image	Coordinates	Type	Ref.
Hozumi Bridge 穂積橋; Hozumi-bashi	Uwajima			33°13′24″N 132°33′38″E		

== See also ==
- Cultural Properties of Japan
- Iyo Province
- Museum of Ehime History and Culture
- List of Cultural Properties of Japan - paintings (Ehime)
- List of Places of Scenic Beauty of Japan (Ehime)
