= Jacqueline Grennan Wexler =

American academic administrator and former Catholic nun

President of the National Conference of Christians and Jews
- In office October 14, 1982 – 1990
- Preceded by: Dennis C. Hart

President of Hunter College
- In office January 15, 1970 – 1979
- Preceded by: Fritz Joachim Weyl (acting)
- Succeeded by: Joseph Shenker

7th President of Webster College
- In office 1965 – June 1969
- Preceded by: Francetta Barberis, SL
- Succeeded by: Leigh Gerdine

Personal details
- Born: Jean Marie Grennan; August 2, 1926 Sterling, Illinois, United States
- Died: January 19, 2012 (aged 85) Orlando, Florida, United States
- Resting place: Calvary Cemetery, Sterling, Illinois
- Spouse: Paul J. Wexler (m. 1969)
- Children: 2 (adopted)
- Parent(s): Edward Grennan; Florence Dawson
- Education: Webster College (BA); University of Notre Dame (MA)

Jacqueline Grennan Wexler (born Jean Marie Grennan; August 2, 1926 – January 19, 2012), commonly known as Sister J, was an American Catholic former religious sister who rose to prominence when she, as President of Webster College, strove to convince the Holy See allow the transferral of the college's ownership to a lay board of trustees. Webster College became the first Catholic university to legally split from the Catholic Church. She later left her religious order, the Sisters of Loretto, and was President of Hunter College in New York City from 1970 to 1980. She went on to serve as President of the National Conference of Christians and Jews from 1982 to 1990.

Born in 1926 in Illinois, Wexler grew up on a farm and matriculated at Webster College in 1944. In 1948, she joined the Sisters of Loretto and went on to teach in Texas and Missouri. In 1957, she graduated with a master's degree from the University of Notre Dame, and in 1959, was transferred to work at Webster College, becoming Vice President in 1960. In 1965, Wexler succeeded Sister Francetta Barberis as president of the college. Wexler soon began major reforms, improving curricula, renovating and expanding the campus, and initiating volunteer service programs. In 1967, Grennan completed Webster College's transition to lay ownership, and she herself left her religious order.

In 1969, Wexler became President of Hunter College in Manhattan, part of the City University of New York. There, she dealt with student protests and expanded the college's healthcare curriculum and facilities. She left Hunter College in 1979, and in 1982, she became President of the National Conference of Christians and Jews, remaining until 1990, when she retired. She died in 2012 in Orlando, Florida.

== Early life and education ==
Jean Marie Grennan was born on August 2, 1926, in Sterling, Illinois, United States. The youngest child of Edward and Florence (née Dawson) Grennan, she had two sisters, Sue and Rita, and a brother, Jack, who died as a young adult. She grew up on a 250-acre farm where her parents raised cattle and grew corn and soybeans. Grennan's parents were devout Catholics who impressed on her the value of education. She attended St. Mary's Parochial School and Catholic Community High School in Sterling. She was the first girl in her high school to pursue a general science course rather than study home economics.

After graduating, Grennan attended Webster College in Webster Groves, Missouri. She majored in mathematics and graduated cum laude with a Bachelor of Arts in June 1948. Rather than applying for a fellowship to attend Radcliffe College as she had considered, she decided to become a nun, later explaining that she wanted "to make [my] life productive for as many people as possible." In 1949, she formally entered the Sisters of Loretto, and in December 1950, made her first vows. She took Jacqueline as her religious name, in memory of her brother Jack, who died of a brain tumor at age 21. Her parents were ambivalent about her becoming a nun, but respected her decision.

After her first vows, Grennan was sent off to teach in Texas and later Missouri. During the summers, she studied English at the University of Notre Dame in South Bend, Indiana. She graduated in 1957 with a Master of Arts in English. She has been awarded 14 honorary degrees, each from a different college or university.

== Early career ==
After pronouncing her first vows in December 1950, Grennan was sent to teach at Loretto Academy in El Paso, Texas, where she taught mathematics and English for four years. In 1954, she was transferred to teach at Nerinx Hall High School in Missouri, where she taught mathematics, English, and religion. She remained there until 1959, while taking summer classes at the University of Notre Dame. In 1959, Grennan was brought in to Webster College to serve as assistant to President Sr. Francetta Barberis. In 1960, she became Vice President for Development, and in 1962, was made Executive Vice President.

== President of Webster College ==
Grennan became President of Webster College in 1965 when President Barberis accepted a new position in Washington, D.C. As president, she worked to address declining enrollment and to improve academic quality. Recognizing that many Roman Catholic women's colleges were experiencing a downturn in enrollment, she decided to transition Webster to coeducation. Enrollment soon grew significantly. Academics were revamped with innovative curricula including "new math," "new social studies," and "new physics," and improved teacher training with a new Master of Arts in Teaching degree. In addition, Grennan removed the theology course requirements from the curriculum in 1965.

In addition to changes in curriculum and enrollment, Grennan commenced an ambitious campaign to improve Webster College's physical plant. She reached out to wealthy institutions, like the National Science Foundation and the Ford Foundation, and individuals like Conrad Hilton for donations. The existing campus was renovated, and new facilities were constructed. In addition, she expanded the primary and secondary education that already existed at the College by initiating a Head Start program, expanding the on-campus elementary school, and establishing the Webster Institute of Mathematics, Science, and Arts, a secondary-level laboratory school.

Grennan began a social justice campaign in which students were sent to the poorest St. Louis neighborhoods to volunteer. This initiative attracted the attention of the Kennedy administration, and in 1963, she was appointed to the President's Advisory Panel on Research and Development in Education. In 1965, Johnson administration officials offered her a job as director of an anti-poverty program in St. Louis, which she declined. Though she turned down the position, it was around this time that Grennan realized she did not wish to "live as a responsible and productive human being for the rest of [my] life under the vow" of obedience as a nun. In 1965, she was appointed to the Steering Committee of Head Start, and was named a member of the Education Task Force for the Peace Corps. In 1967, she was named to the President's Task Force on Urban Educational Opportunities.

=== Transition to lay ownership ===
In addition to the many internal changes at Webster College, Grennan had, since 1965, also sought the Vatican's approval to turn the college's ownership from the Sisters of Loretto to a lay board of trustees. In addition to financial concerns and the Sisters' hope to resolve tensions with the Archbishop of St. Louis, Joseph Ritter, Grennan and the Sisters gave three reasons for requesting the change in a 1967 Webster College press release:

It is becoming more and more difficult for a religious order to finance a college adequately from internal resources... The administration of an expanding college where lay faculty members constitute seventy-five percent of the faculty is becoming far too complex to be adequately directed by a Board of Directors made up exclusively of members of a religious order, charged with many and diverse responsibilities... We currently lack adequate and qualified sister-personnel to continue to fill all the administrative and faculty posts in the college which were formerly filled by sisters.

The Vatican did not immediately grant the request, and Grennan engaged in open discourse with Church authorities through public statements, earning her and Webster College a place in national headlines. She said at the time, "The very nature of higher education is opposed to juridical control by the Church," but maintained that "the Christian grace is translated into every secular institution today. The Holy See finally granted the request in May 1967, and Sister Mary Luke Tobin, the Superior General of the Sisters of Loretto, announced on November 17, 1967 that the transferral of Webster College to independent ownership had been legally concluded. Simultaneously with Webster College's transition, Grennan requested a dispensation from her religious vows. Her given reason was that she had "continued to experience a personal conflict between her administrative submission to external juridical control by the Church." She further explained, "I have given someone else the authority to limit or veto my decisions." The same year, the Holy See granted her dispensation, though she noted "I never ceased being a member of the family." In the 1980s, she became a member of the Loretto Community, the lay branch of the Sisters of Loretto.

Because this was the first time a Roman Catholic college or university had ever been removed from Church ownership, and with the additional element of Grennan leaving the Sisters, both she and the college were the subject of much media attention as well as controversy, with one president of a Catholic college describing the move as "extremist." Archbishop Fulton J. Sheen, the Catholic televangelist, replied to a reporter asking for his reaction, "No comment. I am more interested in Nathan Hales than in Benedict Arnolds." The Brooklyn Tablet, a conservative Catholic newspaper, ran the story under the headline, "Webster College Leaves the Church," and a secular news magazine used the title, "Another Nun Defects."

The media attention surrounding the Webster College controversy propelled Grennan to national prominence. Amidst the reforms of Second Vatican Council, which concluded in 1965, Grennan was a leading proponent of progressive change in the Church. She advocated a greater role for women in the Church, and publicly opposed the Church's ban on contraception. In 1967, she was named a Woman of Accomplishment by Harper's Bazaar. Her story was featured in newspapers such as The New York Times, the Chicago Daily News, The Kansas City Star, The Boston Globe, the St. Louis Post-Dispatch, and the Dallas Times Herald, and magazines like The New York Times Magazine, Time, Saturday Review, Life, the Ladies' Home Journal, Look, and Change: The Magazine of Higher Learning. She also made television appearances, joining David Susskind on his show Open End and going on as a guest on The Dick Cavett Show.

After leaving the Sisters of Loretto in 1967, Grennan remained President of Webster College until June 1969, when she married Paul J. Wexler.

== President of Hunter College ==
Soon after her marriage, Grennan Wexler moved to New York City, taking the job of Vice President and Director of International University Studies with the Academy for Educational Development. In December 1969, the Board of Higher Education of the City of New York named Grennan to succeed Fritz Joachim Weyl (acting president) as President of Hunter College in Manhattan. She assumed the presidency on January 15, 1970. She was the first female president of the college.

Wexler's assumption of the presidency coincided with a turbulent atmosphere at Hunter College. Between May and March 1970, campus unrest grew as students protested over the Vietnam War, racial policies, rising tuition and fees, a new open enrollment policy, and general discontent with the college's administration. That spring, protests repeatedly shut down the campus. Student protesters would block entrances to buildings and occupy elevators and specific floors of buildings. At first, she allowed the protests to continue without bringing in law enforcement. When protests became such an issue that they obstructed the college's operation and after being trapped in her office several times, Wexler called the New York City Police Department to help regain control of the campus. After one instance in which students barricated her in her office and accused her of colluding with "pigs," she told The New York Times that her experience being condemned by conservatives when she was at Webster College prepared her for the turmoil at Hunter College. She attested, "Zealotry is the enemy. The far right called you every name, from daughter to Beelzebub on, and you learned to take it." After bringing in the police, Wexler cancelled classes and on several occasions, closed down the entire school to restore order. Through negotiations with students and faculty, she was able to restore the college to its normal routine.

In response to protests in many City University of New York colleges, the Board of Higher Education ordered the implementation of a new Open Enrollment Policy effective September 1970. This policy increased university-wide enrollment, changed the racial diversity of the student body, and altered the undergraduate curriculum to include courses on African-American studies, Puerto Rican studies, and women's studies. Despite facing opposition from members of the student body, Wexler avidly supported the changes and was instrumental in the policy's implementation.

After the rocky beginning to her presidency, Wexler was able to focus on academic improvements, especially focusing on the college's healthcare curriculum. She expanded healthcare training, obtained funding to create a gerontology program in the School of Social Work, and started a women's studies program. In June 1974 she accomplished the incorporation of the Bellevue Hospital School of Nursing into Hunter College's Division of the Schools of Health Professions. In 1978, Wexler became the first woman elected to the board of directors of United Technologies Corporation. She left the presidency of Hunter College in 1979.

== Later career ==
In 1980, Wexler became the first women named a Life Trustee of the University of Pennsylvania. On October 14, 1982, Wexler became President of the National Conference of Christians and Jews. The first female president of the organization, she "spoke frequently on interfaith issues in hopes of encouraging mutual respect among religions." She served as president of the NCCJ until 1990, when she retired and moved to Orlando, Florida, with her husband. There, she tutored mathematics in the Orange County Public Schools for several years.

== Death and legacy ==
Wexler died unexpectedly in her sleep at her home in Orlando, Florida, on January 19, 2012, aged 85. A funeral Mass was celebrated on January 21 at St. Mary Catholic Church in Sterling, Illinois, and she was buried at Calvary Cemetery in Sterling.

Elizabeth Stroble, who was at the time President of Webster University, described upon her death Wexler's "charismatic" and "visionary" leadership, saying, "The seeds of change that [Jacqueline] planted have transformed Webster into a vastly different institution. The university has grown to become the only Tier One, private, nonprofit university with more than 100 campuses across the United States, Europe and Asia."

Wexler's legacy remains through a memorial fund established to the Edward W. Grennan Family Scholarship at Newman Central Catholic High School in Sterling, Illinois.

== Personal life ==
Grennan Wexler married Paul J. Wexler, the president of Orpheum Productions, on June 11, 1969, and adopted his two children, Wendy and Wayne. She remained a devout Catholic throughout her life.

== Awards and honors ==
- St. Louis Globe-Democrat Woman of Achievement, 1964
- St. Louis Chapter of the Association for Women in Communications Newsmaker Award, 1965
- Member, Academy of Missouri Squires, 1966
- Harper's Bazaar Woman of Accomplishment, 1967
- New York University School of Education Annual Award for Creative Leadership in Education, 1968
- YWCA Elizabeth Cutter Morrow Award, 1968
- University of Pennsylvania Graduate School of Education National Award of Distinction from the Alumni Association, 1979
- Webster University Distinguished Alumna/Alumnus Award, 1985
- Abram L. Sachar Silver Medallion, Brandeis University National Women's Committee, 1988
- St. Louis Chapter of the American Society for the Technion, Albert Einstein Award, 1989
- Brigham Young University Marriott School of Management International Executive of the Year Award, 1990

=== Honorary degrees ===
- Doctor of Humane Letters, Carnegie Institute of Technology, 1966
- Doctor of Humane Letters, Colorado College, 1967
- Doctor of Laws, Skidmore College, 1967
- Doctor of Humanities, University of Michigan, 1967
- Doctor of Humane Letters, Brandeis University, 1968
- Doctor of Laws, Franklin & Marshall College, 1968
- Doctor of Science, Central Michigan University, 1970
- Doctor of Laws, Temple University, 1970
- Doctor of Humane Letters, Syracuse University, 1971
- Doctor of Laws, Smith College, 1975
- Doctor of Humane Letters, University of Pennsylvania, 1979
- Doctor of Divinity, Lafayette College, 1990
- Doctor of Humane Letters, University of South Florida, 1991
- Doctor of Laws, Webster University, 2007

== See also ==
- List of former Roman Catholic nuns
