= Mother Praxedes Carty =

Irish American educator (1854–1933)

Mother M. Praxedes Carty
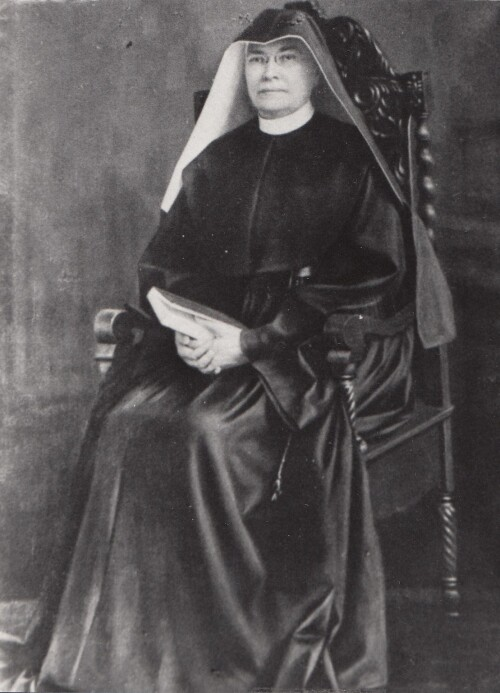
- Mother Praxedes, c. 1890-1899
- Born: Susan Carty; 1854; Bawnboy
- Died: 16 December 1933 (aged 78–79)
- Burial place: Loretto, Kentucky
- Organization: Sisters of Loretto

Mother Mary Praxedes Carty (born Susan Carty; 1854 – 16 December 1933) was an Irish American educator and member of the Roman Catholic order of the Sisters of Loretto. Mother Praxedes worked throughout the Southwestern and Western areas of the United States building and improving churches and schools. She is known for updating the constitution for the order of the Sisters of Loretto, helping to build the school now known as Webster University and for founding the Loretto Academy in El Paso, Texas.

== Early life and education ==
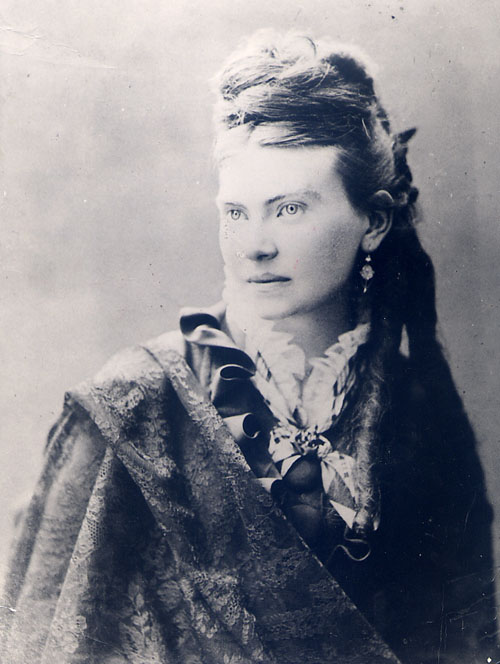
Susan Carty c. 1870s

Mother Praxedes was born in Bawnboy in 1854 and was named Susan Carty. She was one of eleven children. In Bawnboy, she listened to the Parish Priest who advocated for helping others. Because of that, as a child, she became a guide to a blind woman, named Moira. In 1865, the family emigrated to St. Louis. In Cape Girardeau, she was impressed by the Loretto School and the sisters who worked there. Her family moved to Loretto, Kentucky in 1874. Her mother and father returned to Ireland.

Susan Carty entered the novitiate in Loretto, Kentucky in 1874. She took on the name of a Roman martyr, Praxedes, though she wasn't happy about the choice. Sister Praxedes contracted tuberculosis and was sent West to Santa Fe in 1875. The trip to New Mexico took place over thirteen days riding in a wagon and part of the way by ship. Two other nuns riding with Sister Praxedes died during the trip, one from cholera and the other was described as dying of fright after their caravan was attacked by Native Americans. In Santa Fe, Sister Praxedes finished her novitiate training. She took her vows as a Sister of Loretto with Bishop Jean Baptiste Lamy.

== Career ==
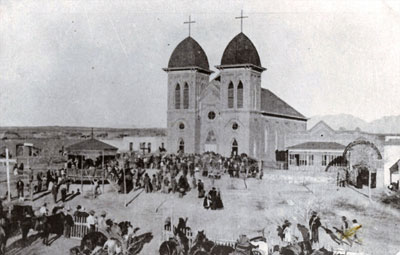
St. Genevieve Church in Las Cruces, New Mexico, dedicated on October 15, 1887.

Praxedes went to Bernalillo, New Mexico in 1877 as a superior. In Bernalillo, she demonstrated her skills as a good manager. She was also responsible for the girls' school. In Bernalillo, she learned to speak Spanish.

She was sent to Las Cruces, New Mexico in 1879 as the Mother Superior to the Loretto Academy of the Visitation. The academy was $5,000 in debt and unfinished. Mother Praxedes raised money for the academy and forced parents through the court system to pay delinquent tuition. She planted a vegetable garden so that the sisters and boarders could save money on food costs. She forged relationships with influential members of the city of Las Cruces. Mother Praxedes also worked to raise money through bazaars and other fundraising sales. The first bazaar held in April 1881 may have been the first to take place in the Southwest. Mother Praxedes ended the academy's debt and made further improvements. In 1886, Eugene Van Patten, the tax assessor sued the Las Cruces Loretto Academy, claiming that the sisters were using the building for profit, rather than charity. Mother Praxedes testified in court about the vegetable garden and other aspects of charity the group was involved with. Also in 1886, she helped rebuild the church of St. Genevieve, raising more than $3,000 for the cause. The church was dedicated on 15 October 1887.

Mother Praxedes was sent to Florissant, Missouri for a year in 1893 then in 1894, she went to Loretto Heights outside Denver. She helped build a school at St. Mary's in Denver. Here, she helped prevent the foreclosure of the land the school was built on by negotiating an extension of the loan with the mortgage holders. Against the rules of the Order, she was appointed, rather than voted, Mother Superior of all of the Society of Sisters of Loretto in 1896 and went back to Loretto, Kentucky. In 1899, she toured the country, visiting convents and schools of the Loretto Order.

Mother Praxedes and the Mistress of Novices went to Rome in 1903 and brought a new constitution for the Sisters of Loretto to the Pope. Mother Praxedes and the Mistress of Novices spent their time studying in Rome while they waited on the Pope's decision. The new constitution was viewed by Pope Pius IX in 1904 and put to a three-year trial. After this Mother Praxedes returned to the United States. In 1905, she went to Las Cruces where a new school was being planned. Shortly after that trip, she became ill and spent several weeks in recovery in Michigan. For part of 1907, she toured Loretto schools and convents in the Western states, starting in Missouri. Later, she went back to Rome in 1907 during which the new constitution was fully approved. In January 1908, she returned to the United States again. She spent time visiting the Las Cruces academy again in 1909, where she was welcomed with a program featuring music and choir song. In July 1910 she was re-elected as mother general of the Order.

Mother Praxedes began to work on rebuilding the Loretto Academy and beginning work on St. Paul Academy in St. Paul, Kansas in October 1914. In July 1916 she was re-elected as mother general of the Order. Also in July, Mother Praxedes started working on the Loretto College for Women in St. Louis, Missouri, which is now known as Webster University. During the 1918 flu pandemic, Mother Praxedes sent sisters to work as nurses into places that needed assistance. On 28 July 1921, Mother Praxedes celebrated the 25th anniversary of her election as Mother General of the Loretto Order.

== Later life and death ==
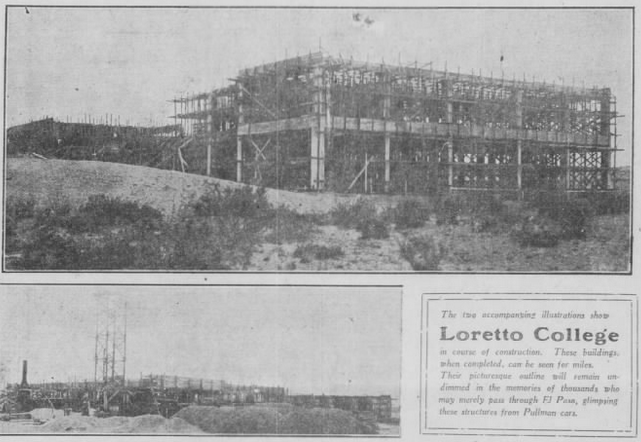
Construction of Loretto Academy in El Paso in 1922.

Mother Praxedes came to El Paso, Texas in the early 1920s to help start a girls' school. In El Paso, Mother Praxedes chose the Austin Terrace area of El Paso to build her school, Loretto Academy. She worked with Gustavus A. Trost to create plans for the building. She bought 19 acres of land in the area on 20 March 1922. The location was far from the downtown area and good water sources. Residents of El Paso and the local bishop didn't initially believe that parents would want to send their children to the school located there and many called the project "Praxedes Folly."

In 1923, she officially retired, but stayed on in El Paso to continue to supervise the construction of the academy.

Classes began on 11 September 1923. However, while the school opened, not all of the buildings were completed until the 1930s. In 1927, the Catholic Students' Mission Crusade awarded their highest distinction, the Grand Cross of the Paladins, to Mother Praxedes.

Morther Praxedes went to St. Louis in 1931, where she went to secure an $80,000 loan for the academy. While she was there, she was injured in a fall, which would lead to later illness and complications. Mother Praxedes became ill in 1932. She died on 16 December 1933. Her funeral services were held on 18 December at Loretto Academy with hundreds in attendance. Mother Praxedes' body was returned to Loretto, Kentucky for burial.

A novel based on Mother Praxedes' life, Only One Heart, by Sister Patricia Jean Manion was published in 1963. In 2001, Mother Praxedes was named to the Hall of Honor by the El Paso County Historical Society.
