= M. Sue Kurita =

American judge

M. Sue Kurita is an American judge. Kurita graduated from Loretto Academy in 1972. She holds a bachelor's degree from the University of Texas at El Paso (UTEP) and a master's degree in counseling from Webster University. During Kurita's first year at Texas Tech University School of Law, she was diagnosed with Castlemans Disease and required major thoracic surgery during Spring Break. Kurita, who was raising her daughter on her own, underwent recovery and treatments crediting the law school and classmates for providing the support so she could finish her assignments on time. Kurita graduated law school in 1985. She passed the Texas bar in 1986. In 1998, she was appointed the Judge of the El Paso County Court at Law, No. 6.

In 2004, Kurita was elected as the vice president of the National Association of Women Judges. She served as vice chair of the Texas Supreme Court State Commission on Judicial Conduct and is on the Judicial Commission on Mental Health. .

== See also ==
- List of Asian American jurists
