= Hōan-ji temple ruins =

Asuka period Buddhist temple ruins

Hōanji temple ruins
- 法安寺跡 (Japanese)
- Hōanji-ji temple ruins Hōan-ji temple ruins (Japan)
- Interactive map of Hōanji temple ruins
- 33°53′59″N 133°05′23″E
- Type: temple ruins
- Periods: Asuka period
- Location: Saijō, Ehime, Japan
- Region: Shikoku

History
- Built: c.596

Site notes
- Public access: Yes (no facilities)

Hōanji temple ruins (法安寺跡) is an archaeological site with the ruins of a Hakuho period Buddhist temple located in the Komatsu neighbourhood of what is now the city of Saijō, Ehime, Japan. The actual name of the temple is unknown, as it does not appear in historical records, and the site takes its name from a later Shingon temple named Hōan-ji which was built on top its ruins. The Asuka period temple remnants were designated as a National Historic Site in 1944, with the area under designation expanded in 1969.

== History ==
The Hōanji temple ruins are located on the right bank of the Nakayama River, which flows through the center of the Dozen Plain at the eastern base of the Takanawa Peninsula. In 1934, a survey uncovered several groups of foundation stones in the grounds of the existing temple of Hōan-ji. The group of 14 stones to the north believed to be the ruins of the Asuka period Kondo, and there are eight foundation stones under Yakushi-do, which is now the current main hall of Hōan-ji. Several foundation stones are in front of the Main Hall and 16 cornerstones for a Japanese pagoda indicate a structure with a base of about 12 meters on each side. To the north of the ruins of the Kondo are the ruins of the Lecture Hall, and nearby there are the ruins of the bell tower and the ruins of a Shinto shrine. The layout of the structures is the same as Shitennō-ji in Osaka. The history of the temple is unknown; however, there is a legend that a temple was built in 596 by the provincial governor, Ochi Masumi, in association with Prince Shotoku's visit to Iyo Province.

A large number of relics have been unearthed from within the area, including a large number of roof tiles and Sue ware and Haji ware pottery. From these artifacts, it has been determined that the temple existed from the Asuka period to the middle of the Heian period.

The site is about 25 minutes on foot from Iyo-Komatsu Station on the JR Shikoku Yosan Line.

== See also ==
- List of Historic Sites of Japan (Ehime)
