= Kōshin-an =

Historic villa in Ehime Prefecture, Japan

Coordinates: 33°50′37″N 132°45′17″E

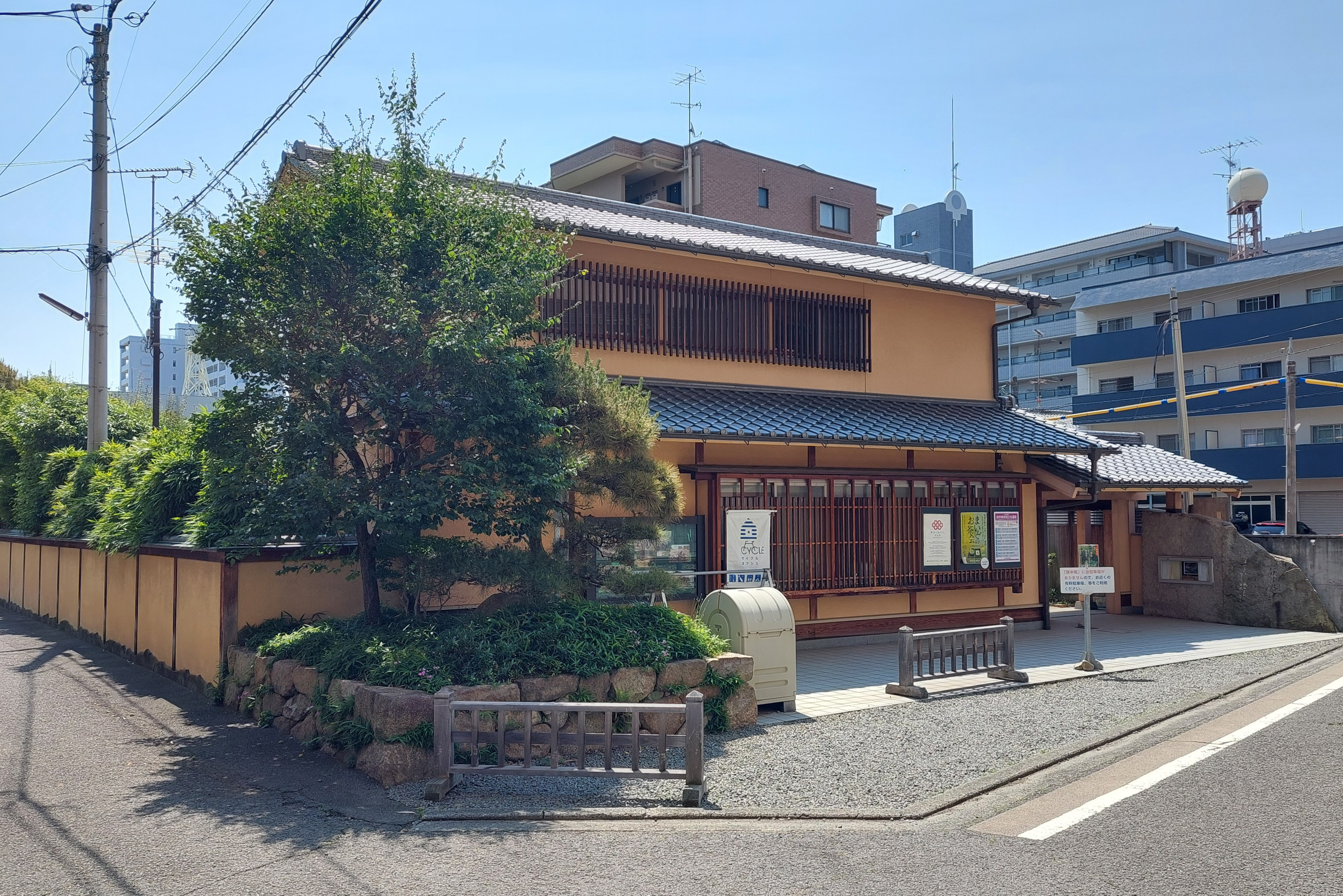
Kōshin-an

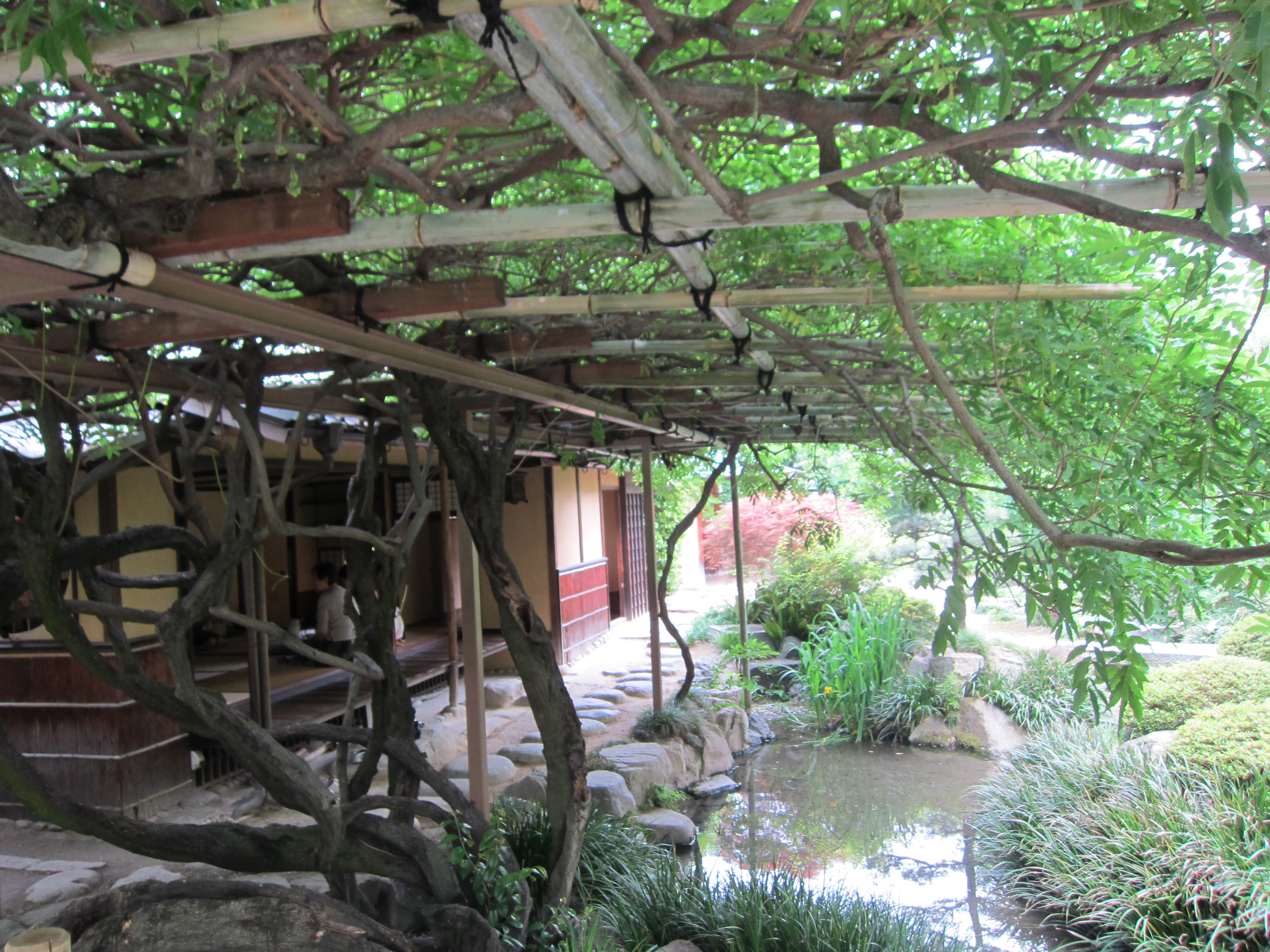
Kōshin-an garden

Kōshin-an (庚申庵) is a retreat including a Japanese garden and a house in Matsuyama, Ehime Prefecture, Japan. This was once a villa or a humble cottage of Kurita Chodō, a haiku poet of the Edo period. Today, part of the house was restored to preserve its original form as one of the special historic sites in Ehime, and NPO corporation GCM Kōshin-an Club are involved in voluntary activities to promote it.

== History ==
The villa was built in 1800, in the style of Matsuo Bashō's Genju-an, by Kurita Chodō to spend the rest of his life peacefully and deepen exchange with haiku poets in Matsuyama. Chodō enjoyed haiku gatherings, tea ceremony and simply viewing the garden. He wrote about his reclusive life in the cottage in his journal Kōshin-an ki (庚申庵記). According to the journal, Chodō named his cottage "Kōshin-an" for the year of its construction, Kōshin. After the original owner's death, the house was used by local people to entertain guests over many years. To match the needs of each owner, extensions and reconstructions were made. From then on, in about 200 years, the house was abandoned and affected by natural disasters. However, local residents sought to preserve the place and refurbished it. Although the surrounding area was destroyed during World War II, the cottage including the garden miraculously survived. The house was endangered for some years, but a report by a student from Matsuyama Shinonome College led to interest in preserving and restoring the humble cottage as a historical valuable place. In 2000, Matsuyama City decided to reserve and reconstruct the house as a publicly owned property. After the investigation and restoration, during which extended sections and additions were removed, Kōshin-an was restored with its original shape and atmosphere much as it was in the Edo period. In 2003, the house and its garden were opened to the public as a historic garden.

== Structure ==
The house was originally composed of three rooms with an entrance. One of the rooms was called "yojo-han" or four and half tatami mats, and used for haiku gatherings. The room is rather unusual that it has no tokonoma; an alcove where art or flowers are displayed, so there was no Kamiza (place of honor) there. This design was chosen because Chodō wanted his guests to be equal in the gatherings, regardless of their social status. Another room was "sanjo" or three tatami mats room which is used for tea ceremony and enjoying talking with friends. The "nijo" or two tatami mats room was used for his daily life. Thanks to the research of members of the house, it was found out that kitchen and bathroom were added onto the house, the entrance was modified. As for the rooms, relatively new materials are used in "yojo-han" and "nijo" tatami rooms, and it shows that these rooms were modified after his time.

== Entrance and garden ==
In the entrance gate, there is a kuhi which includes a haiku by Kurita Chodō:

草の戸乃ふる幾友也梅の花 （樗堂題）

kusa no to no furuki tomo nari ume no hana

the grassy door
an old friend
with the plum tree

Originally, this poem was written in a hanging scroll in the house. Chodō took white ume blossom planted in front of the retreat Kōshin-an in this poem. Wisteria, originally planted 250 years ago and provided shade in his time, is full bloom around the end of April. There is a stone statue of Jizō which stands looking over the garden.

== See also ==
- List of Historic Sites of Japan (Ehime)
