= Hirajō Shell Mound =

Hirajō Shell Midden
- 平城貝塚 (Japanese)
- Ōguruwa Shell Midden Hirajō Shell Mound (Japan)
- Interactive map of Hirajō Shell Midden
- 32°57′46″N 132°33′53″E
- Type: midden
- Periods: Jōmon period
- Location: Ainan, Ehime, Japan
- Region: Shikoku

Site notes
- Public access: None

The Hirajō Shell Midden (平城貝塚, Hirajō kaizuka) is an archaeological site with a shell midden and Jōmon period settlement site located in the Machihata, Heijō, and Mishō neighborhoods of the town of Ainan, Ehime Prefecture in the island of Shikoku, Japan. The site was designated as a prefectural historic site in November 1951 and as a National Historic Site of Japan in 2024.

== Overview ==
During the early to middle Jōmon period (approximately 4000 to 2500 BC), sea levels were five to six meters higher than at present, and the ambient temperature was also 2 deg C higher. During this period, the Kantō region was inhabited by the Jōmon people, many of whom lived in coastal settlements. The middens associated with such settlements contain bone, botanical material, mollusc shells, sherds, lithics, and other artifacts and ecofacts associated with the now-vanished inhabitants, and these features, provide a useful source into the diets and habits of Jōmon society. Most of these middens are found along the Pacific coast of Japan.

The Hirajō Shell Midden is made of saltwater shells and is located on a plateau at an elevation of 6 to 7 meters, about one kilometer from the mouth of the Sozu River, which flows west through the center of Ainan Town. The shell mound is about one meter deep, and measures 160 meters north-to-south, and 70 meters east-to-west, forming a roughly elliptical shape. It was discovered in 1891, and seven excavations have been subsequently conducted. Archaeological excavations in 1954 unearthed human bones, late Jōmon pottery, chipped stone axes, ground stone axes, shell rings, bone needles, large fish bones such as tuna, and small horse teeth. Stone arrowheads, stone weights, and concave stones are also known to have been found in the older collected materials. The late Jōmon pottery discovered at this site is classified into five types, and Type 1 pottery, which constitutes the majority of pottery in the mound in terms of quantity, is called Heijō-type, and many are jar-shaped, similar to the Kanegasaki-type pottery of Kitakyushu. Remains that are thought to be the remains of a dwelling have also been discovered.

== See also ==
- List of Historic Sites of Japan (Ehime)
