= Herne, Belgium =

Herne
- Municipality
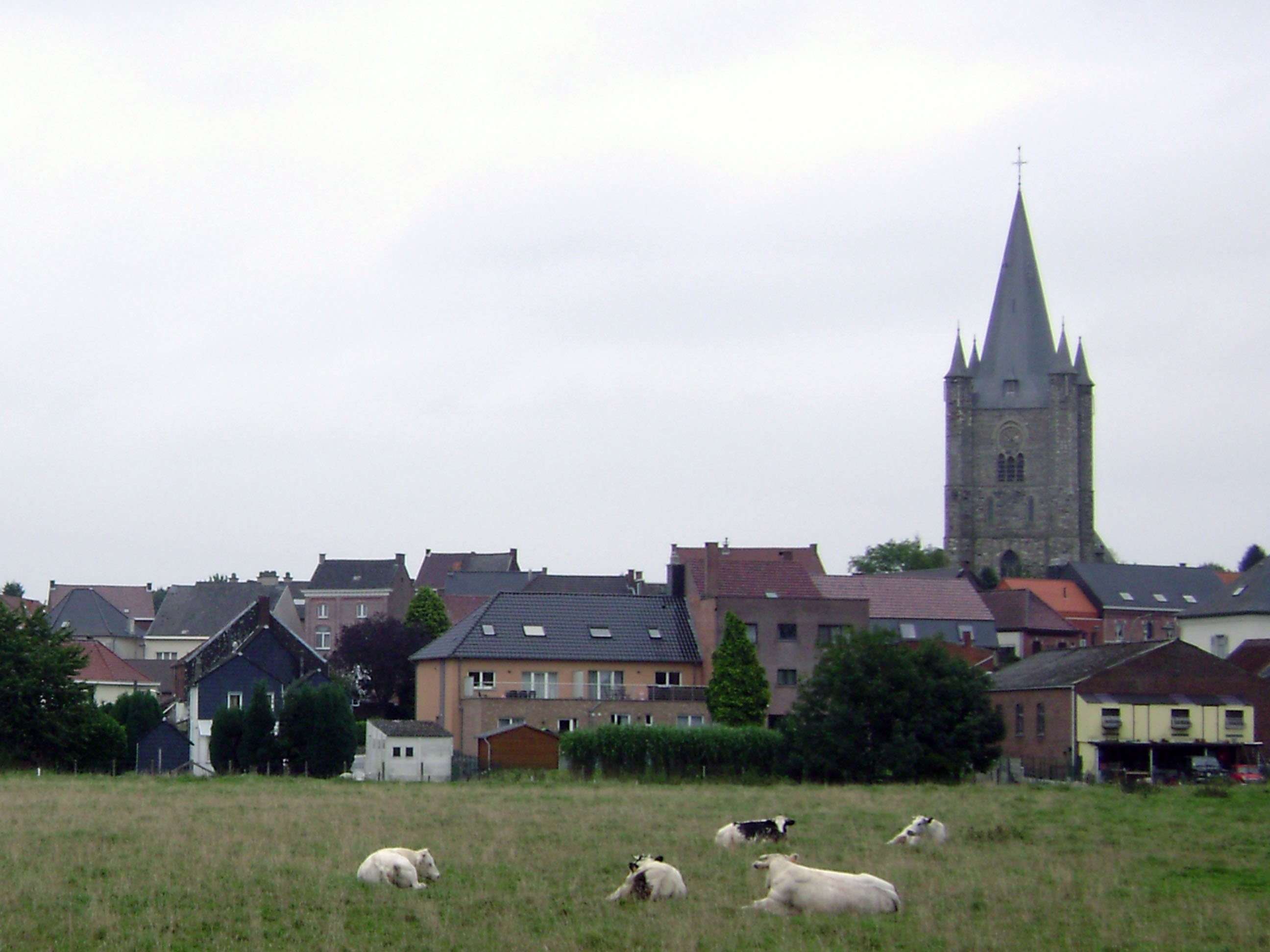

- Flag Coat of arms

- Location of Herne in Flemish Brabant
- Interactive map of Herne
- Location in Belgium
- Coordinates: 50°43′N 04°02′E
- Country: Belgium
- Community: Flemish Community
- Region: Flemish Region
- Province: Flemish Brabant
- Arrondissement: Halle-Vilvoorde

Government
  - Mayor: Kris Poelaert (CD&V)
  - Governing party: CD&V

Population (2018-01-01)
  - Total: 6,643
- Postal codes: 1540, 1541
- NIS code: 23032
- Area codes: 02, 054
- Website: www.herne.be

Herne (Dutch pronunciation: [ˈɦɛrnə]; French: Hérinnes, pronounced [eʁin]) is a former municipality in the province of Flemish Brabant, in Flanders, one of the three regions of Belgium. It is now part of the municipality of Pajottegem, following the 2025 fusion of the Belgian municipalities. The former municipality of Herne contained the towns of Herfelingen, Herne proper and Sint-Pieters-Kapelle. On January 1, 2006, Herne had a total population of 6,407. The total area is 44.63 km² which gives a population density of 144 inhabitants per km².
