= Yuzuki Castle =

Ruins of a 14th Century Japanese fortress at Matsuyama (Ehime Prefecture)

- 湯築城
- Matsuyama, Ehime Prefecture, Japan
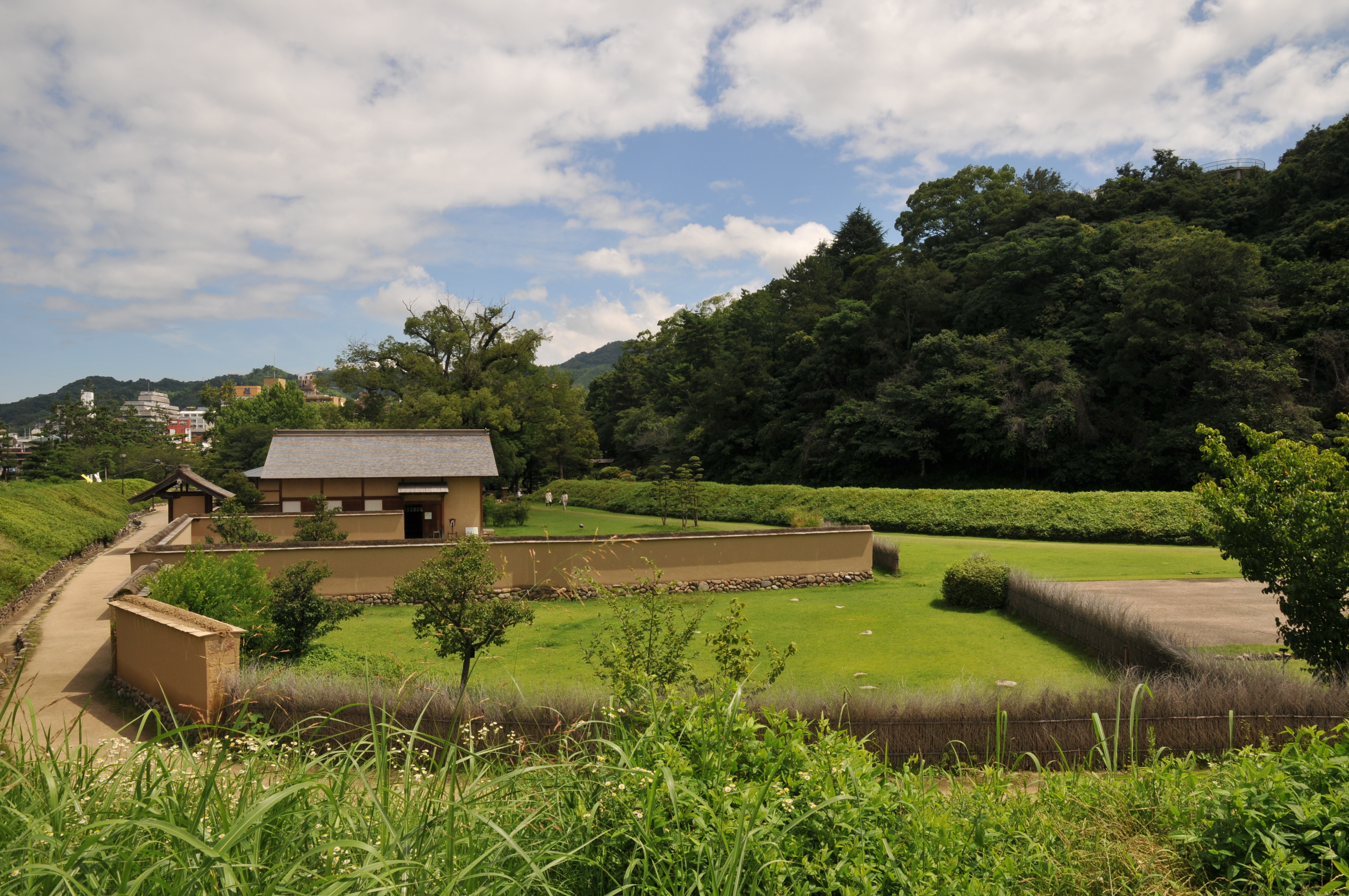
- Reconstructed buildings at Yuzuki Castle

Site information
- Type: Teikakushiki hirayama-style Japanese castle)
- Condition: ruins

Location
- Yuzuki Castle Yuzuki Castle (Japan)
- Coordinates: 33°50′54.8″N 132°47′13.9″E

Site history
- Built: c.1335
- Built by: Konō clan
- In use: Muromachi - Sengoku period
- Demolished: 1585
- National Historic Site of Japan

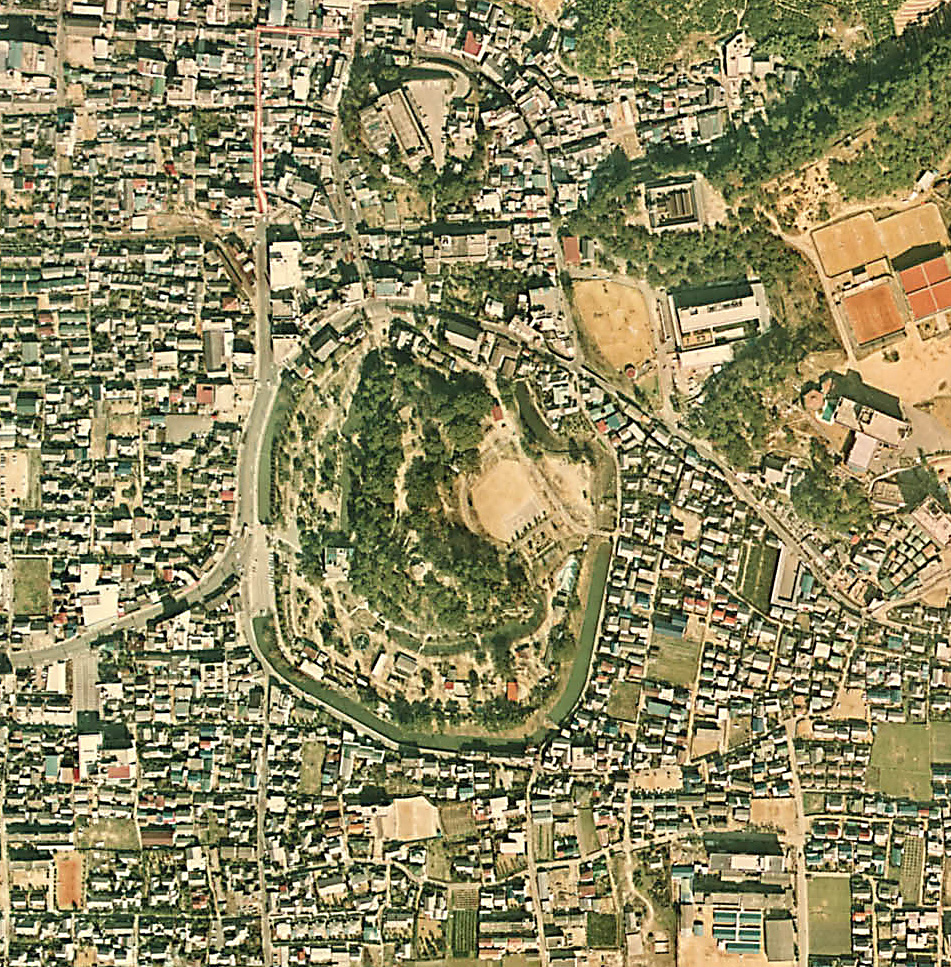
Aerial photograph of the site

Yuzuki Castle (湯築城, Yuzuki-jō) was a former Japanese castle located in the city of Matsuyama, Ehime Prefecture, Japan. During the Muromachi period, it was the stronghold of the Kōno clan, who ruled Iyo Province under the Muromachi shogunate. The ruins of the castle were area designated a National Historic Site.

== Overview ==
Yuzuki Castle is located on a hill near the spa town of Dōgo Onsen. At the end of the Heian period, Kōno Michinobu supported Minamoto no Yoritomo against the Heike clan during the Genpei War and was awarded with a large territory in Iyo Province in Shikoku. In the Kamakura period, the clan sided with Emperor Go-Toba against the Kamakura shogunate in the Jōkyū War and was suppressed, but due to the efforts of Kōno Michiari during the Mongol invasions of Japan in 1274 and 1281, the clan was restored to their position as shugo of Iyo province. In the Muromachi period, the clan found their position to be increasingly in name only. As Iyo Province was divided by geography into several river valleys, local warlords resisted Kōno overlordship, and the clan was threatened by the aggressive stance of the Hosokawa clan who dominated neighboring Sanuki Province.

Yuzuki Castle was constructed with these threads in mind. It consists of a Motte-and-bailey design with a hill and two surrounding water moats. The hill was divided into several enclosures, protected by clay walls. The diameter of the castle was roughly 400 meters.

During the Sengoku period, the Kōno were allied with the Murakami pirates, who dominated the Seto Inland Sea and by the Mōri clan of Aki Province; however, these alliances did not protect the clan when Chōsokabe Motochika of Tosa Province invaded from the south, the armies of Toyotomi Hideyoshi invaded from the east, and the Mōri reneged on their alliance and attacked from the north.Yuzuki Castle was surrendered to Toyotomi Hideyoshi without a fight in 1585 and the Kōno clan came to an end. Hideyoshi chose not to use Yuzuki Castle, so its ruins remained relatively well-preserved into the modern era. Its ruins were excavated in 1988, now form part of Dōgo Park. A samurai complex has been reconstructed and the area is popular for its hanami (flower viewing) in spring.

Yuzuki Castle was listed as one of Japan's Top 100 Castles by the Japan Castle Foundation in 2006.

The castle is located a five minute walk from Matsuyama city tram Dōgo-Onsen Station.

== See also ==
- List of Historic Sites of Japan (Ehime)
