= Maria-Elena Giner =

American public servant

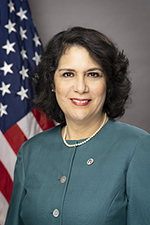

U.S. Commissioner of the International Boundary and Water Commission
- In office August, 2021 – April 21, 2025
- President: Joe Biden; Donald Trump
- Succeeded by: William Charles "Chad" McIntosh

Personal details
- Education: Loyola Marymount University (BS Civil Engineering); University of Texas at El Paso (MBA); University of Texas at Austin (Ph.D. Public Policy)
- Occupation: Civil engineer

Maria-Elena Giner is an American engineer and former U.S. Commissioner of the International Boundary Water Commission (IBWC). Appointed by President Joe Biden in 2021, she was the first Latina and second woman to hold the position. She left the position in 2025, following a demand for her resignation from President Donald Trump as he began his second term. Following her departure, she joined Black & Veatch, a major engineering firm, as a portfolio lender.

== Early life and education ==
Giner is the daughter of an immigrant and has lived half her life in Mexico and half her life in the United States. Her mother is from California and her father is from Chihuahua. Giner was born in Los Angeles, but moved to Juarez, Mexico when she was in elementary school. She later attended St. Joseph's and Loretto Academy. She credits her upbringing on the border and a lack of consistent access to water as her inspiration to study civil engineering and participate in public policy.

Giner is a first-generation college graduate. She holds a Bachelor of Science in civil engineering from Loyola Marymount University, a Master of Business Administration from the University of Texas at El Paso, and a Ph.D. in Public Policy from the University of Texas at Austin.

== Career ==
After receiving her degree, Giner began working for the Border Environmental Cooperation Commission (BECC). In 2010, Giner was appointed general manager of BECC. According to Giner, under her tenure, the percentage of the Mexican population across the border with wastewater service increased from 26% to over 90%, reducing 700 million gallons a day of raw sewage from flowing between Mexico and the United States.

In August 2021, Giner was appointed by President Joe Biden to head the IBWC. Her appointment was endorsed by twelve Congressional House members. During her four-year tenure, she oversaw major efforts such as a $650 million plan to tackle the Tijuana River sewage crisis and beginning repairs at a San Diego wastewater treatment plant which was polluting the ocean and forcing beach closures.

In April 2025, Giner was asked by the Trump administration to either resign or be terminated. According to Giner, she was not surprised because it was a new administration. She expressed gratitude that she was allowed to remain in office for four months and that the position was not left vacant. She was replaced by William Charles "Chad" McIntosh who previously served as the acting deputy administrator for the Environmental Protection Agency (EPA).
