= Kume Kanga ruins =

Archaeological site in Japan

- 久米官衙遺跡群 (Japanese)
- Kume Kanga ruins Kume Kanga ruins (Japan)
- Interactive map of Kume Kanga ruins
- 33°48′37″N 132°48′05″E
- Periods: Asuka period
- Location: Matsuyama, Ehime, Japan
- Region: Shikoku

History
- Built: 7th century AD

Site notes
- Elevation: 27 m (89 ft)
- Public access: No

The Kume Kanga ruins (久米官衙遺跡群, Kume kanga isekigun) is an archaeological site with the ruins of a Nara to Heian period government administrative complex and ruins of a Buddhist temple located in the Kishimachi neighborhood of the city of Matsuyama in Ehime prefecture on the island of Shikoku of Japan. The site has been protected as a National Historic Site from 1979, with the area under protection expanded in 2003 and again in 2005.

== Overview ==
The Kume Kanga ruins are located on a slight highland (Kishi Plateau), about 4 kilometers southeast of Matsuyama City, where the Horikoshi River flows to the north and the Ono River flows to the south. More than 100 archaeological excavations have been conducted since 1967, when the ruins of what was believed to have been a Nara period Japanese pagoda foundation and Lecture Hall with portions of a cloister from an abandoned temple were excavated. In 1979, the site was designated a National Historic Site under the designation Kuju Temple Ruins (来住廃寺跡); however, as excavation progressed it became apparent that what was believed to have been the foundation stones for a pagoda were in fact the foundations of a Main Hall, and what was believed to have been the cloister of the temple was actually part of a government administrative complex that existed on the site before the temple was constructed. For this reason, the historic site designation was changed and the area under protection expanded.

=== Kiju Temple ruin ===
The temple ruins date from around the end of the 7th century; however, the temple does not appear in surviving historical documentation and its name or other details are unknown. The foundations of the Main Hall consist of an earthen platform ten meters on each side with a height of one meter, and eight surviving foundation stones. This corresponds to a 5 × 4 bay Kondo with actual dimensions of 10.8 × 8.9 meters. On the site of the altar was a worked stone which corresponded to the top floor of a pagoda, which contributed to the initial misidentification of this site as the ruins of a pagoda. To the northeast of the ruins of the main hall, is the site of a building believed to be a lecture hall, and to the north of that is the site of a building believed to be the priest's chambers. The site of the temple is disturbed by medieval remains, and the details of the layout of the temple as well as the extent of the temple enclosure is unknown. A round roof tile with a single-layer ten-leaf lotus design has been excavated from the temple grounds. This roof tile is dated around 650.

=== Corridor-like remains ===
The foundations of a roofed corridor consisting of two rows of pillars on the inside and outside was found on the west side of the temple ruins, and was initially believed to have been a cloister associated with the temple. However, as excavation progressed, it became clear that the orientation was incorrect, and that part of the site overlaps, and therefore predated, the temple ruins. The "cloister" was found to surround a square enclosure 110 meters on each side, connecting a structure believed to have been a South Gate with a "Seiden", or administrative building, with the layout corresponding to a Nara-period local administrative complex. The total dimensions of the complex were found to be 500 meters east–west and about 400 meters north–south.

The foundations of a taxation warehouse complex, surrounded by a moat and fence, were found to the northwest of the above administrative complex. The site was expanded about 30 meters to the south around the end of the 7th century or the beginning of the 8th century, and the dimensions after this expansion was about 140 meters north-to-south when measured along the perimeter of the moat. A second and smaller administrative completes was located about 80 meters southeast of the main complex mentioned above. It appears to have occupied a square section of about 43 meters on each side was separated by a board fence. This site has been considerably leveled for rice paddy cultivation, and not many relics have been unearthed.

In the Nara period, after the establishment of a centralized government under the Ritsuryō system, local rule over the provinces was standardized under a kokufu (provincial capital), and each province was divided into smaller administrative districts, known as (郡, gun, kōri), composed of 2–20 townships in 715 AD. Each of the units had an administrative complex built on a semi-standardized layout based on contemporary Chinese design. It is uncertain when this complex was constructed; however, fragment of Sue ware pottery with the words '"Kume-hyo" written on it was excavated on this site. Since the character "hyo" was used as an administrative division corresponding to "county" only during the period of about half a century in the latter half of the 7th century, before the enactment of the Taiho Code, this provide evidence for a theory that it was constructed after the visit of Emperor Jomei and Empress Saimei visited Iyo Province (639 and 661, respectively).

The site is located a 15-minute walk from Iyotetsu Yokogawara Line Kume Station.

== See also ==
- List of Historic Sites of Japan (Ehime)
