= Hazaike Kofun =

Burial mound in Japan

- 葉佐池古墳 (Japanese)
- Hazaike Kofun Hazaike Kofun (Japan)
- Interactive map of Hazaike Kofun
- 33°48′52″N 132°50′51″E
- Type: Kofun
- Periods: Kofun period
- Location: Matsuyama, Ehime, Japan
- Region: Shikoku

History
- Built: 6th century

Site notes
- Elevation: 121 m (397 ft)
- Length: 41 m (135 ft)
- Width: 23 m (75 ft)
- Area: 4,786.76 m^{2} (51,524.3 sq ft)
- Excavation dates: 1993-2008
- Owner: Matsuyama city
- Public access: Yes

The Hazaike Kofun (葉佐池古墳) is a Kofun period burial mound, located in the Kitaumemoto neighborhood of the city of Matsuyama, Ehime on the island of Shikoku in Japan. It was designated a National Historic Site of Japan in 2011.

== Overview ==
The Hazaike Kofun is located on a hill with an elevation of 121 meters on the left bank of the Ono River that flows through Matsuyama City, in the central part of Ehime Prefecture on the island of Shikoku. The tumulus is elliptical with a length of 41 meters and a maximum width of 23 meters. A stone-lined burial chamber was discovered in 1992, and five subsequent archaeological excavations were conducted from 1993 to 2008. During these excavations, it was discovered that the mound contained a total of five large and small burial chambers. The larger Burial Chamber No. 1 is to the south of the center of the mound, and Burial Chamber No. 2 is to the north; both chambers open to the west. Burial Chamber No. 4 is adjacent to, and south of, Burial Chamber No. 1, but is orientated to the east; however, all of the stones except for the stone floor have been removed, and the chamber was filled in. Burial Chamber No. 3 is located to the north of Burial Chamber No. 2, and Burial Chamber No. 5 is located between No. 1 and No. 2. Both of these are small pit-type stone chambers. The tumulus itself was constructed in the middle of the 6th century, and additional burials are thought to have been carried out by the beginning of the 7th century.

=== Burial Chamber No.1 ===
Burial Chamber No.1 is a side-entry corridor grave, with a total length of four meters. The burial facility itself is 2.8 meters long, 1.4 meters wide and 1.8 meters high and shows signs of being repaired three times, indicating subsequent burials after the first one, but there is no evidence of anyone entering after the stone chamber was finally closed. It was discovered in 1992, when the landowner at the time tried to clear the land using heavy machinery. One of the ceiling stone was dislodged, but there was no damage inside the stone chamber. Inside were numerous Sue pottery used for offerings and pieces of wood that are thought to have been left over from a wooden coffin. For this reason, Matsuyama City declared the land public domain and began academic research in 1993. Iron implements including an iron axe and an iron arrowhead were also found. The Sue ware pottery was dated to middle to the latter half of the 6th century. The chamber contained the remnants of two wooden coffins, the left one is called "Coffin A" and "Coffin B" on the right. Coffin A was a box-shaped wooden coffin with edge plates and side plates, and the distance between the edge plates was about 190 centimeters. On the other hand, Coffin B was only a single thick board, 190 cm long, 45 cm wide, and 4 cm thick. In addition to one human bone each in coffin, there was another human bone in the left back of the stone chamber from another individual Many fly pupae shells were attached to the human bones in Coffin B. From this, it is presumed that the corpse in Coffin B was in a place exposed to light for a week or more after death.

=== Burial Chamber No.2 ===
Stone Chamber No. 2 is also a side-entry corridor grave with a total length of 7.1 meters. The burial facility itself is 3.6 meters long, 2.3 meters wide and 2.4 meters high. As with Burial Chamber No. 1, there are traces of people entering and exiting at least three times after the first burial, but there is no evidence of anyone entering after the stone chamber was finally closed. Inside was a piece of wood thought to be a fragment of a wooden coffin, as well as grave goods such as Sue ware, horse harnesses, and ironware. Some of the Sue ware were left in their original form, but most were deliberately broken into fragments and scattered around. Similarly, pieces of wood, harnesses, ironware, etc. were scattered throughout the stone chamber, in a disturbed state. Eight iron nails were found along with the piece of wood, and it is presumed that this piece of wood was originally a wooden coffin. However, it is not known whether all the pieces of wood belonged to the coffin, and the iron nails were not placed in such a way as to suggest the original shape of the coffin. Also, judging from the scattered human bones it does not appear that the coffin had naturally collapsed. As no one has entered the chamber after it was closed, it is certain that such destruction took place before the closing of the stone chamber, but the intention is not clear. The human remains proved to be that of three individuals.

The tumulus is about a 20-minute walk from Umenomoto Station on the Iyotetsu Yokogawara Line.

== See also ==
- List of Historic Sites of Japan (Ehime)
