= Tōmyō-ji ruins =

Kamakura period Buddhist temple ruins

Tōmyō-ji temple ruins
- 等妙寺旧境内 (Japanese)
- Tōmyō-ji temple ruins Tōmyō-ji ruins (Japan)
- Interactive map of Tōmyō-ji temple ruins
- 33°13′50″N 132°40′31″E
- Type: temple ruins
- Periods: Kamakura period
- Location: Kihoku, Ehime, Japan
- Region: Shikoku

History
- Built: c.1330

Site notes
- Public access: Yes (no facilities)

The Tōmyō-ji temple ruins (等妙寺旧境内, Tōmyōji kyū-keidai), is an archaeological site with the ruins of a late Kamakura period Buddhist temple located in the Shiba neighborhood of the town of Kihoku, Ehime, Japan. The temple no longer exists, but the temple grounds were designated as a National Historic Site in 2008.

== Overview ==
Narasan Tōmyō-ji is said to have been founded in 1320 by a priest name Rigyoku Kasho. Rigyoku was born in Awaji and studied Buddhism at Mount Hiei, the head temple of the Tendai sect of Buddhism. From the late Heian and Kamakura period, Mount Hiei had become notorious for the laxity of its practice and corruption of its priesthood. A movement to revive the Buddhist precepts as outlined by Saichō, the founder of the Tendai school began, centered on monks based in Kurodani, the West Pagoda of Mount Hiei. The movement styled itself as "Tendai Ritsu" and was active in missionary work and relief activities for the common people. The movement received official sanction under the reign of Emperor Go-Daigo and was granted the temple of Hosshō-ji in Kyoto as its head temple. Rigyoku trained at Hosshō-ji and established Tōmyō-ji in Iyo Province as he felt that its topography resembled that of Mount Hiei. At the time, all of Uwa District of Iyo Province was a vast shōen controlled by the Saionji family, and the Saionji agreed to sponsor the temple's construction. By the year 1330, the temple is recorded as having 12 chapels in addition to a majestic Esoteric Buddhism training hall. However, after the conquest of Shikoku in 1587 by Toyotomi Hideyoshi, The area was granted to Toda Katsutaka, who seized the temple's treasures and estates, and had it burned to the ground. It was rebuilt at the foot of the mountain two years later, but on a much reduced scale. The temple survived the Edo Period under the patronage of the Date clan, the daimyō of Uwajima Domain.

The former precincts of the temple are located at an elevation of about 300 meters at the northern foot of Mount Kakkou (1010 meters above sea level) in the Onigajo mountain range in the southwestern part of the prefecture. It was divided into four districts ranging from 400 meters north-south and 250 meters east-west with a valley that opens to the north. After the 1588 fire, the area became an official forest of Uwajma Domain, and a national forest after the Meiji restoration. Due to this, there was no development and the foundation ruins remained intact and undisturbed since the time of the 1588 fire. Archaeological excavations have found 20 flat areas with foundations of stone buildings. The foundations of the Main Hall was six meters high and 25 meters long, attesting to the large scale of the temple. It was found that the stone masonry dates back to the first half of the 14th century, or to the founding of the temple. In addition, in the garden area, a garden pond has been confirmed, and the foundations of a Kannon-do overlooking the pond. The Kannon-do foundations predate the foundation of Tōmyō-ji, confirming suspicions that the temple was constructed on top of a pre-existing holy site. There are two groups of stone tombs in the eastern district across the valley. A variety of relics have been excavated, including trade ceramics, domestically produced pottery, Haji ware, and metal products, all from between the 14th and 16th centuries.

The site is about 15 minutes by car from Chikanaga Station on the JR Shikoku Yodo Line.

== See also ==
- List of Historic Sites of Japan (Ehime)
