= Luis Avila =

Sport
- Country: United States
- Sport: adaptive skiing, adaptive rowing, and wheelchair curling
Medal record
Representing United States
Invictus Games

Luis Avila is a U.S. Army captain and athlete who is a recipient of a Purple Heart medal. Also a singer, he has performed at several public ceremonies and events, including the 2017 National Memorial Day Concert on the east lawn of the U.S. Capitol.

Avila garnered particular attention during a military ceremony in September 2019, where he was reportedly disparaged by President Donald Trump after delivering an emotional rendition of "God Bless America."

== Early life ==
Avila was raised in a military family from Metairie, Louisiana, a large, unincorporated community which is part of the greater New Orleans metropolitan area. Avila received a bachelor’s degree in accounting and computer science, and a master’s degree in business and organizational security management from Webster University.

== Career ==
=== Military service ===
Avila began his military career with the U.S. Army in 2000 as an enlisted soldier, and later became an officer in 2004. He served in several combat deployments, including Operation Noble Eagle, Operation Iraqi Freedom, and Operation Enduring Freedom. An advocate for wounded warriors, he is undergoing rehabilitation at Walter Reed National Military Medical Center in Bethesda, Maryland.

==== Injuries and recovery ====
On December 27, 2011, during his fifth combat deployment and second to Afghanistan, Avila's military police unit was struck by a 600-pound IED, killing three soldiers and nearly killing Avila. Among his numerous injuries, Avila lost his left leg, suffered two heart attacks and two strokes, and a lack of oxygen led to brain damage. During this time, he endured three instances of clinical death. After being stabilized, he was transported to the United States while still in a coma and on life support. After 40 days, Avila finally exhibited signs of responsiveness, twitching facial muscles and responding to words by moving his tongue; he was hospitalized for four years, enduring numerous surgeries and therapies and uses a motorized wheelchair.

=== Awards and decorations ===
Avila is the recipient of numerous decorations, honors and medals, including the Bronze Star, Purple Heart, and The Order of the Marechaussee in Silver, the highest award for military police.

=== Trump controversy ===
On September 30, 2019, incoming Chairman of the Joint Chiefs General Mark Milley held a change-of-command ceremony at Joint Base Myer–Henderson Hall, located near the Pentagon, and Milley invited Captain Avila to sing “God Bless America.” According to news accounts, President Donald Trump, who along with Vice President Mike Pence attended the ceremony, congratulated and provided an emotional embrace of Avila after his performance, but then within earshot of several witnesses pressed Milley, “Why do you bring people like that here? No one wants to see that, the wounded.” Trump told Milley to never let Avila appear in public again, a directive that went unheeded by Milley and others.

== Adaptive athletics ==
Avila has participated in national and international athletic events for disabled athletes. He represented the United States at the 2025 international Invictus Games, where he competed in adaptive alpine skiing, pararowing, and wheelchair curling. He represented Team Army at the 2024 U.S. Defense Department Warrior Games, where he competed in archery, cycling, field, indoor rowing, and precision air sports, achieving several gold medals and one bronze medal. In addition, he has achieved first place in the Amputee Warrior Men category of the Army Ten-Miler.

== Music ==
Avila has developed a passion for singing and playing the harmonica, and he has used these talents to inspire others and aid in his own healing. He regularly performs at memorials, galas, the Supreme Court, the U.S. Capitol, as well as at the National Intrepid Center of Excellence near Walter Reed. He has performed more than 100 times, with one performance being shared nationally as he sang a rendition of “God Bless America” alongside Renée Fleming, accompanied by the National Symphony Orchestra at the 2017 Memorial Day Capitol Concert. He performs alongside the Army Band, Air Force Band and Marine Corp Band, and he often performs on his own at charitable events for veterans.

== Personal life ==
Avila's wife, Claudia Avila, serves as his fulltime caregiver and advocate. She has received several awards and other recognition for her steadfast work advocating for disabled veterans. The couple has three sons: Luis, Miguel and Jose. In 2016, the family moved into a specially constructed home in North Chevy Chase, Maryland. The house features smart technology designed to meet the physical needs of Avila, including an elevator and other state-of-the-art equipment throughout the home.
