= Kasagi Pass =

Japanese Mountain Pass

Kasagi-tōge 笠置峠
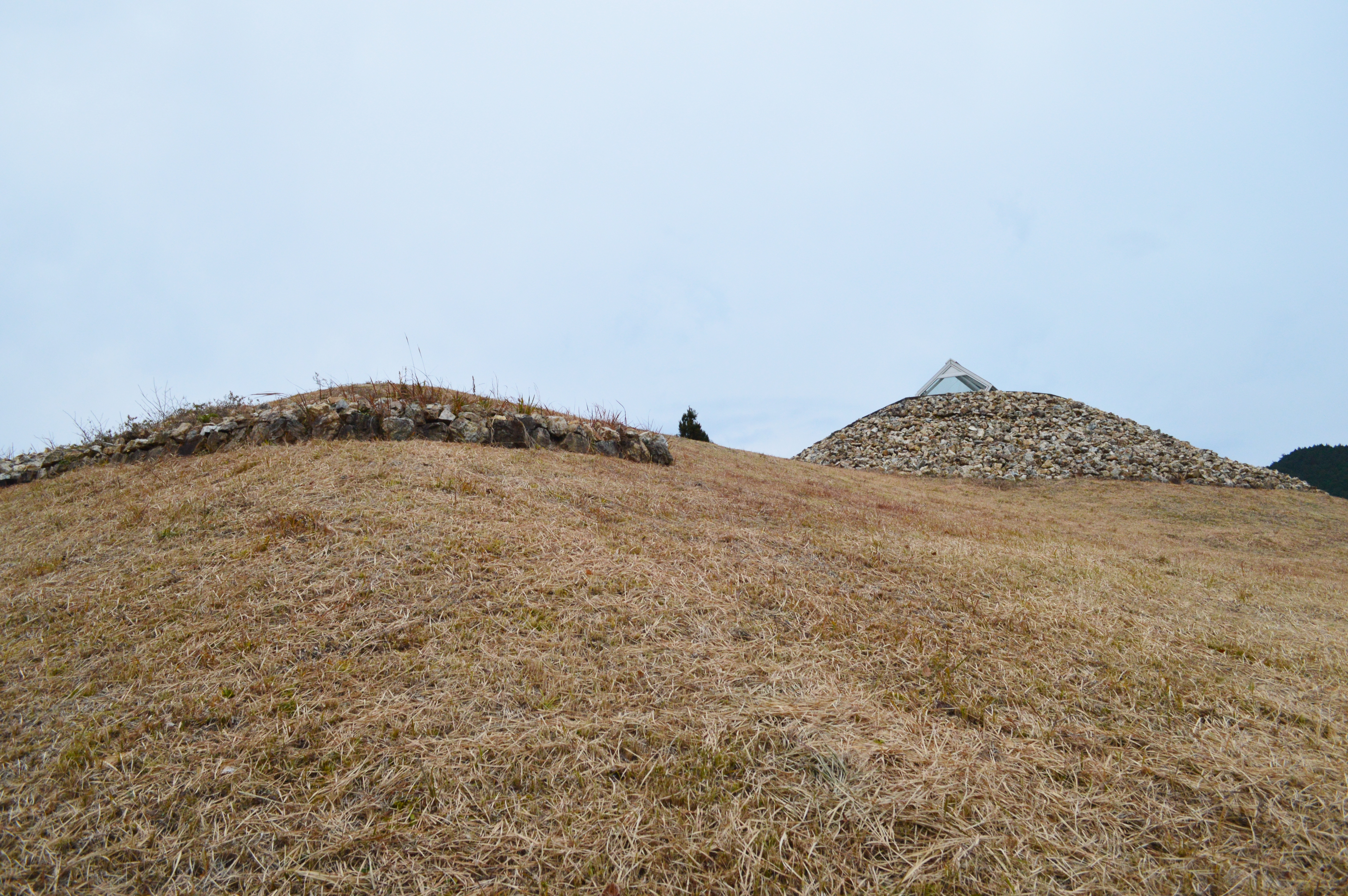
- Kasagitōge Kofun

- Location within Ehime Prefecture Location within Japan
- Elevation: 397 m (1,302 ft)

Location
- Location: Ehime Prefecture, Japan
- Coordinates: 33°24′16.88″N 132°27′50″E
- National Historic Site of Japan

The Kasagi Pass (笠置峠, Kasagi-tōge) is a mountain pass on the old road connecting what is now the port city of Yawatahama with Seiyo in Ehime Prefecture on the island of Shikoku, Japan. A surviving section of the road was proclaimed a National Historic Site in 2017.

== Overview ==
The 397-meter-high Kasagi Pass has been used to connect the coast of former Iyo Province with the mountainous interior since prehistoric times. Near the pass, on the ridge that can be seen from both side, is the Kasagitoge Kofun, an ancient keyhole-shaped burial mound. A Daihannyakyō sutra dated 1478 owned by the temple of Anyō-ji in Seiyo at the southern end of the pass has an inscription indicating that it was made by a person living in Yanohozugaura, on the northern side of the pass, confirming that it was in use during the Muromachi period, and the presence of numerous votive stone monuments to Jizō Bosatsu and other Buddhist deities confirm that was used by pilgrims on the Shikoku pilgrimage, especially by those coming from Kyushu. Records of the Date clan in the Edo period also confirm that this was a route used by daimyō on their sankin kōtai journeys to-and-from the Shogun's court in Edo. In modern times, Japan National Route 197 follows the same route, but passes directly underneath the old pass using the 1157 meter Kasagi Tunnel. The JR Shikoku Yosan Line railway also uses this route and was the last section of the Yosan Line to have been completed.

Although there are places where the road has been altered by the construction of forest roads, in some small sections the original road remains in good condition. One section of about 0.5 km on the Seiyo city side of the pass and another of about 1.1 km on the Yawatahama city side of the pass, with a total area of about 4,400 square meters is designated as a national historic site.

== See also ==
- List of Historic Sites of Japan (Ehime)
