= Herfelingen =

Coordinates: 50.748°N 4.0967°E

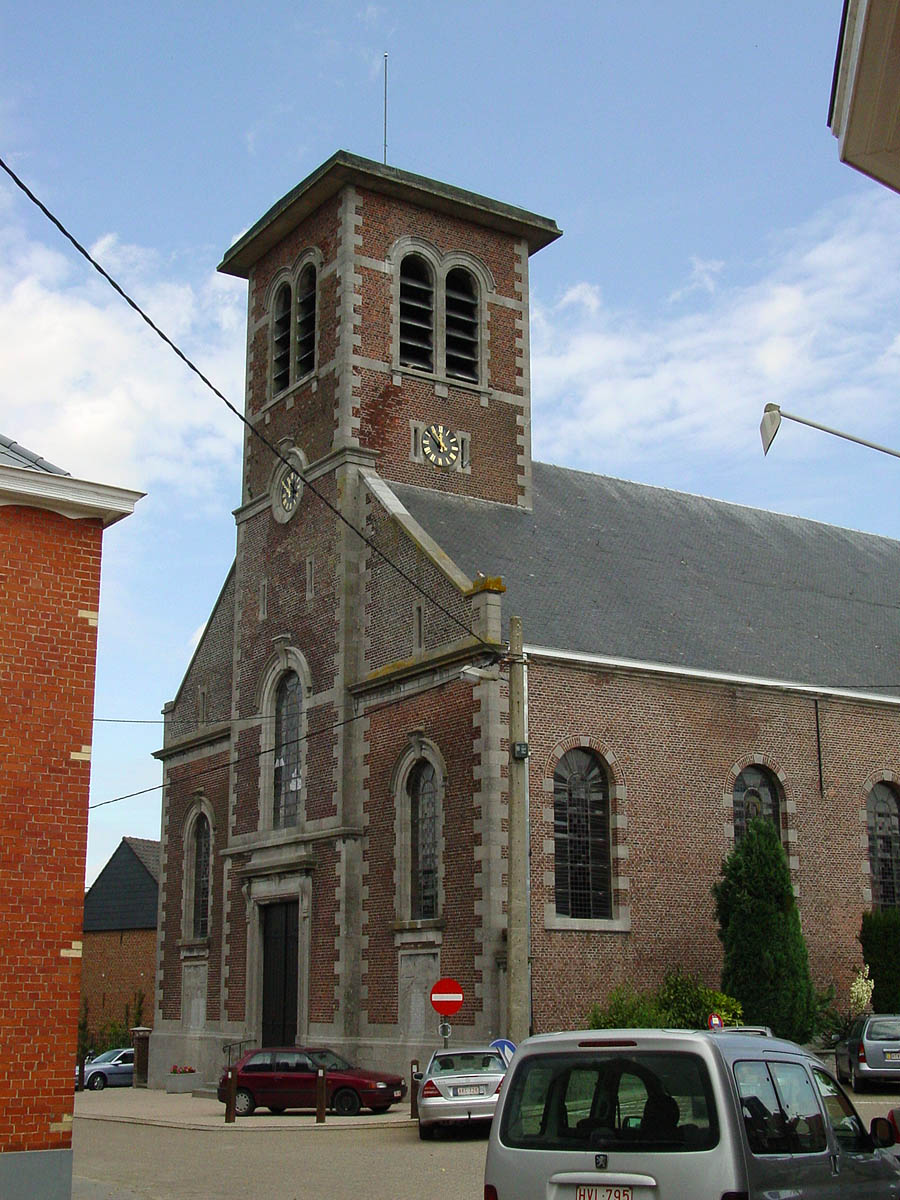
Sint Niklaas church in Herfelingen

Herfelingen is a village in the municipality of Herne in the Belgian province of Flemish Brabant. It was a municipality itself until the fusion of the municipalities in 1977.
