= Revista Católica =

American catholic magazine, 1875–1962

- Categories: Catholic magazine
- Frequency: Weekly (1875–1955); Bimonthly (1955–1962)
- Publisher: Imprenta de Río Grande; Revista Press
- Founder: Donato M. Gasparri, S.J.
- Founded: 1875
- First issue: 2 January 1875
- Final issue: 16 September 1962
- Country: United States
- Based in: Las Vegas, New Mexico; El Paso, Texas
- Language: Spanish
- OCLC: 5347494

Revista Católica was a Catholic magazine that was published between 1875 and 1962. The magazine was first based in Las Vegas, New Mexico and then in El Paso, Texas.

== History and profile ==
Revista Católica was launched by Donato M. Gasparri, S.J. in 1875. The first issue appeared on 2 January. The goal of the magazine was stated in the first issue to present local, national and international news and to offer religious information. It was published by the Imprenta de Río Grande (Río Grande Press) at a Jesuit college in Las Vegas, New Mexico, on a weekly basis. In 1916 the magazine was moved to El Paso, Texas. There the publisher was Revista Press. From 1955 the frequency of the magazine was switched from weekly to bimonthly. Revista Católica folded in 1962, and the last issue was published on 16 September.
