= Nerinx, Kentucky =

Unincorporated community in Kentucky, United States

- Unincorporated community
- Location within Kentucky Location within the United States
- Coordinates: 37°39′51″N 85°23′58″W
- Country: United States
- State: Kentucky
- County: Marion
- Elevation: 705 ft (215 m)
- Time zone: UTC-5 (Eastern (EST))
  - Summer (DST): UTC-4 (EDT)
- ZIP codes: 40049
- GNIS feature ID: 508688

Nerinx is an unincorporated community within Marion County, Kentucky, United States.

Nerinx was founded in the early 19th century by Father Stephen Theodore Badin. Nerinx is the home of the convent and Motherhouse of the Sisters of Loretto.

The Sisters moved to the site around 1820. The town was renamed Nerinckx for Fr. Charles Nerinckx, the founder of the order. The Nerinx post office opened in 1899. The shortened spelling is now generally used.
