= Webster University =

Private university in Webster Groves, Missouri, US

- Former names: Loretto College (1915–1924); Webster College (1924–1983)
- Type: Private university
- Established: 1915; 111 years ago
- Founder: Sisters of Loretto
- Accreditation: HLC
- Endowment: $66.3 million (2025)
- Chancellor: Tim Keane
- Faculty: 175 full-time, 560 part-time (2023)
- Students: 7,606 (fall 2023)
- Location: Webster Groves, Missouri, U.S. 38.5892°N 90.3457°W
- Campus: Suburban, 47 acres (19 ha)
- Colors: Webster blue and gold
- Nickname: Gorloks
- Sporting affiliations: NCAA Division III, SLIAC
- Mascot: Webster Gorlok
- Website: webster.edu

Webster University is a private university with its main campus in Webster Groves, Missouri, United States as well as campuses in Europe and Asia. The university has an alumni network of around 200,000 graduates worldwide.

== History ==
The college was founded in 1915 by the Sisters of Loretto as Loretto College, a Catholic women's college, one of the first west of the Mississippi River. One of the early founders was Mother Praxedes Carty. Its name was changed to Webster College, after Senator Daniel Webster, in 1924. The first male students were admitted in 1962. The sisters transferred ownership of the college to a lay Board of Directors in 1967; it was the first Catholic college in the United States to be totally under lay control. In 1983, Webster College's name was changed to Webster University.

Webster was involved in the early racial integration battles in St. Louis. During the early 1940s, many local priests, especially the Jesuits, challenged the segregationist policies at the city's Catholic colleges and parochial schools. The St. Louis chapter of the Midwest Clergy Conference on Negro Welfare arranged in 1943 for Webster College to admit a black female student, Mary Aloyse Foster, which would make it the city's first Catholic college to integrate. However, in 1943 Archbishop John J. Glennon blocked that student's enrollment by speaking privately with the Kentucky-based Superior General of the Sisters of Loretto. The Pittsburgh Courier, an African-American newspaper with national circulation, discovered Glennon's actions and ran a front-page feature on the Webster incident in February 1944. The negative publicity toward Glennon's segregationist policies led Saint Louis University to begin admitting African American students in summer 1944. In the fall of 1945, Webster College responded to pressure by admitting Irene Thomas, a Catholic African-American woman from St. Louis, as a music major.

In the 1960s, the school dropped its Catholic affiliation following the issuance of the Land O'Lakes Statement. The school's then-president, Jacqueline Grennan, renounced her religious vows and continued as head of what had effectively become a secular institution.

== Academics ==
Colleges include:

- College of Humanities & Social Sciences
- College of Science and Health
- Leigh Gerdine College of Fine Arts
- George Herbert Walker School of Business & Technology
- School of Communications
- School of Education

Webster University is accredited by the Higher Learning Commission. Specific programs are accredited by specialized accreditors, including the Association of Collegiate Business Schools and Programs (ACBSP), the National Association of Schools of Music (NASM), the National League for Nursing (NLN), the Council on Accreditation (COA), the National Council for Accreditation of Teacher Education (NCATE), the Missouri Department of Elementary and Secondary Education, and the National Board for Certified Counselors.

In 2026, Webster University was ranked 32nd in Regional Universities Midwest and 41st in Best Value Schools by U.S. News & World Report.

=== Partnerships ===
Webster University maintains a Confucius Institute in partnership with Beijing Language and Culture University. In 2019, US senator Josh Hawley asked Webster University to close its Confucius Institute.

== Campus ==
Webster University's home campus is located in Webster Groves, a suburb of St. Louis. It has two other campuses in the St. Louis metropolitan area and a campus in San Antonio, Texas. Several international campuses are located in European countries including Switzerland, Austria, Georgia, and the Netherlands. Three campuses are located in Asia: one in Uzbekistan and two in China.

In addition to its own international campuses, Webster has also formed partnerships with a few universities that are based in their countries of interest. For example, the Webster Graduate School was until 2015 tied with Regent's University London; and Webster maintains a relationship with universities including Kansai University in Osaka, Japan and the Universidad Autónoma de Guadalajara in Guadalajara, Mexico. As of 2025–26, faculty-led study abroad opportunities include programs in Costa Rica, Ghana, and Ecuador.

In 2015, Webster released a report on its Thailand campus citing several issues, including badly inadequate facilities and a culture of distrust between students and the administration. The report also cited several strengths on the campus, including strong academics and financial stability, saying "recruitment, marketing and admissions" are an area of strength for the campus. One month after the internal report was issued, a campus ombudsman was appointed to address the communications issues and to bring the Thailand campus more in-line with the home campus' policies. Webster closed the Thailand campus in December 2021.

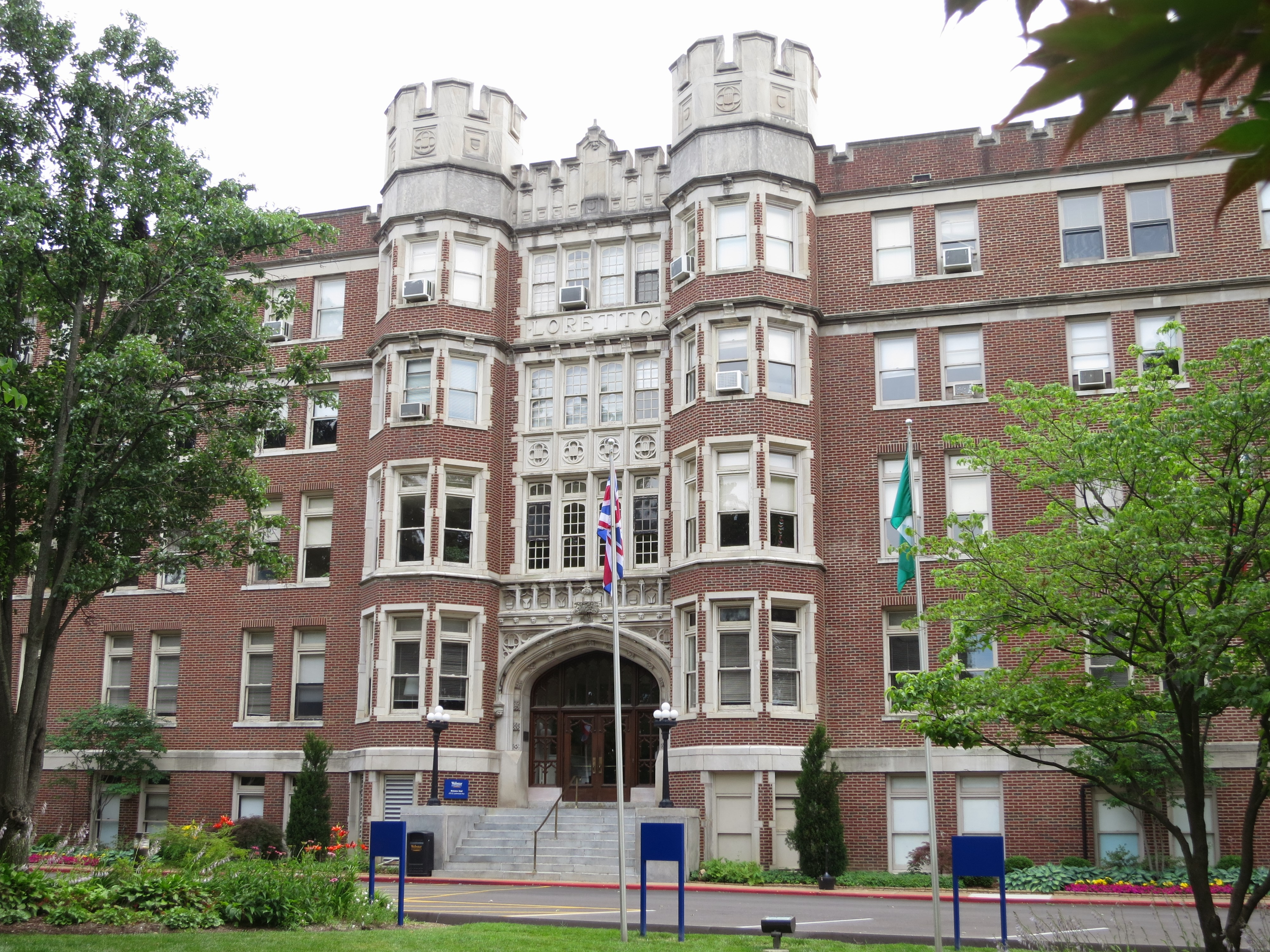
Webster Hall, 2012

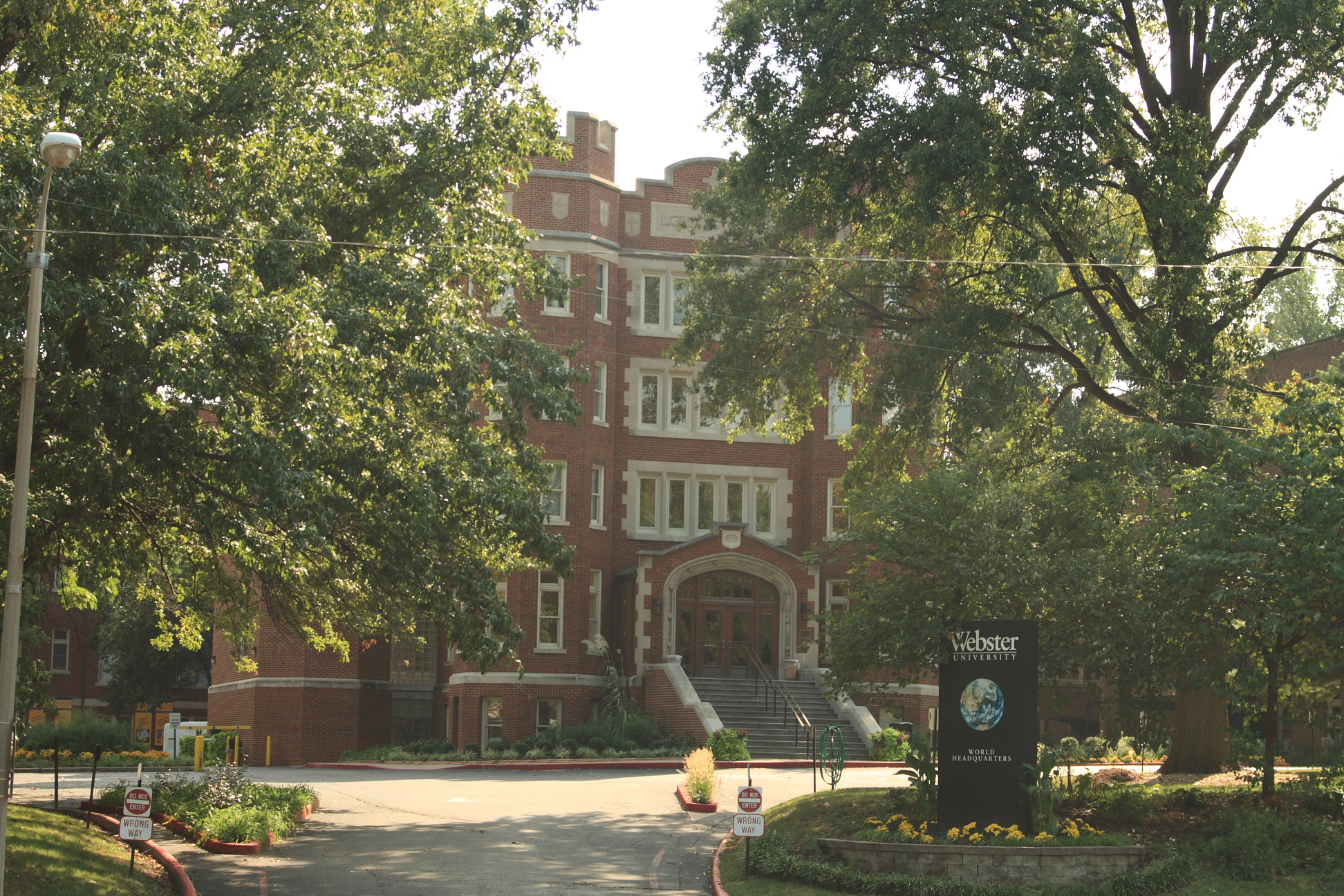
Loretto Hall, 2007

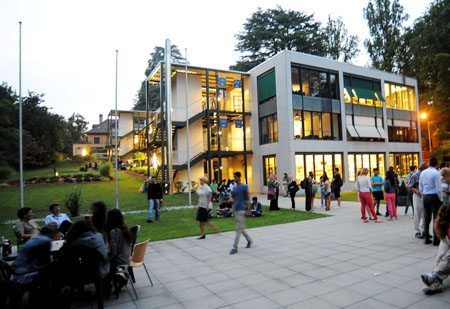
Campus in Geneva, Switzerland, 2012

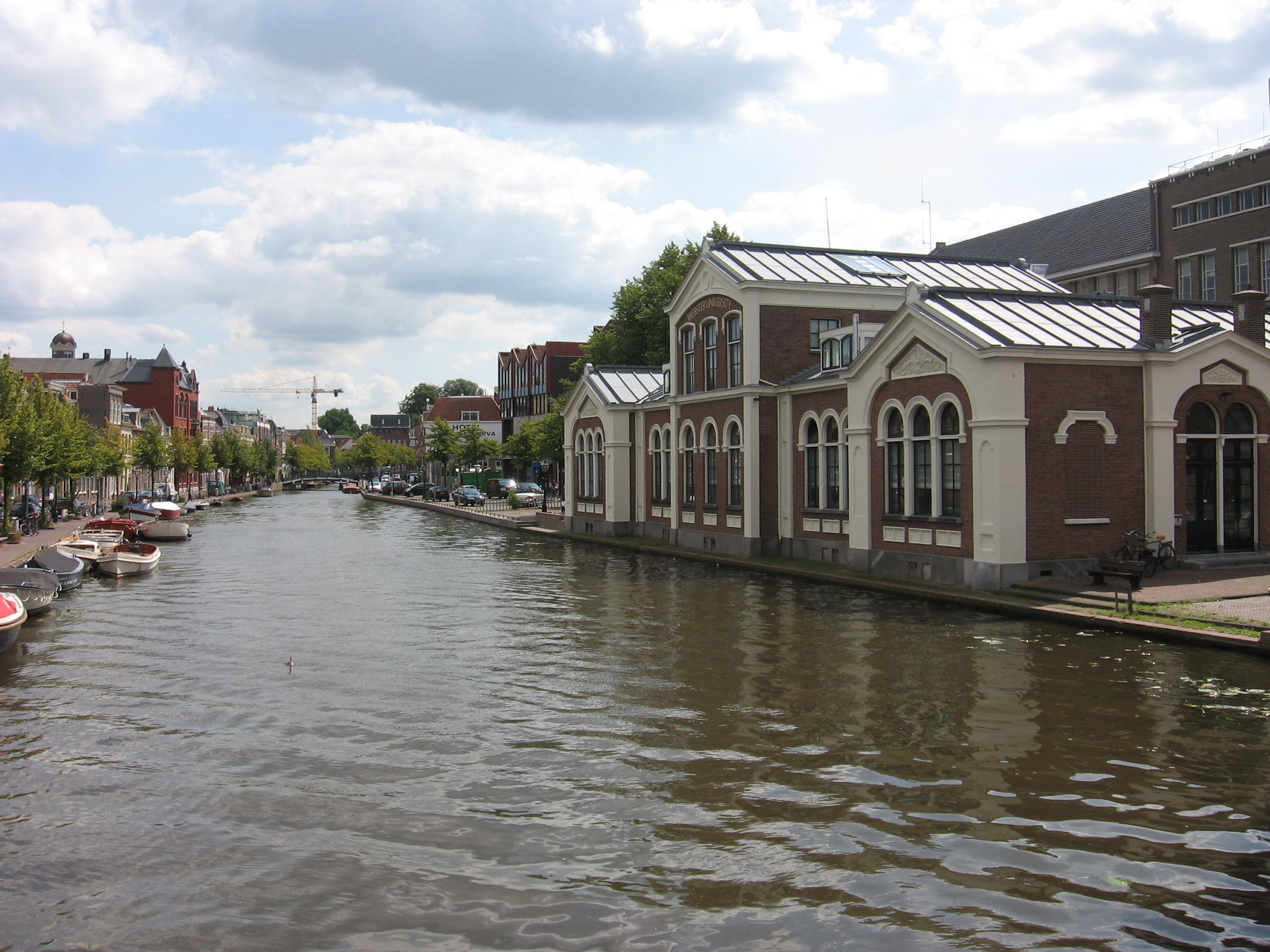
Campus in Leiden, Netherlands, 2009

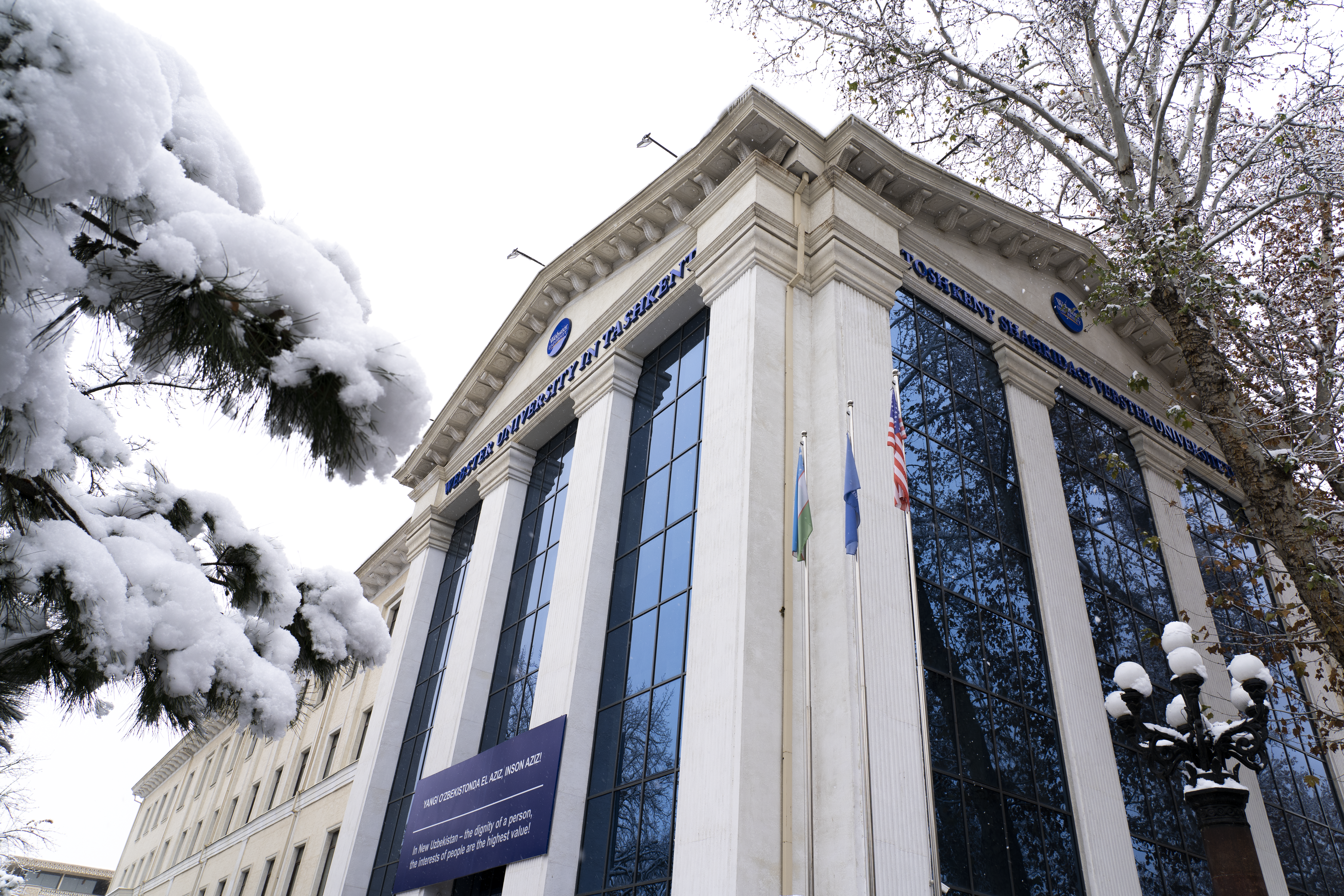
Campus in Tashkent, Uzbekistan, 2023

== Athletics ==
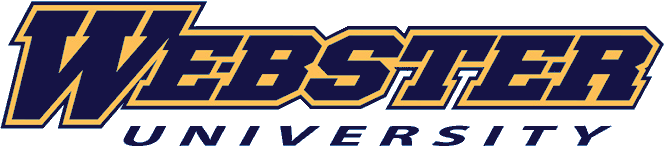
Webster athletics wordmark

Webster University's athletic mascot is the Gorlok, named in honor of the school's location at the corner of Gore and Lockwood Avenues in Webster Groves. Athletic teams participate in the NCAA Division III and in the St. Louis Intercollegiate Athletic Conference (SLIAC).

- Men's sports: baseball, basketball, cross country, golf, soccer, tennis, and track and field
- Women's sports: basketball, cross country, soccer, softball, tennis, track and field, and volleyball

Webster's baseball team has made back to back trips to the Division III World Series, placing fifth in both 2012 and 2013. They also made the Division III World Series in 2015. They made it to the regional Division III championship in 2014 but were defeated in the first round. Major League pitcher Josh Fleming played for Webster.

== Susan Polgar Institute for Chess Excellence (SPICE) ==
Webster's chess team has won more national titles than any college team in the country and has been ranked #1 continuously since 2012. In April 2025, Webster's chess team won its seventh national championship earning the distinction of having the most President's Cup championships than any other college program in the United States. Webster previously won the national title in 2013, 2014, 2015, 2016, 2017, and 2023.

SPICE was founded by chess Grandmaster and Webster University professor, Susan Polgar. She served as the head coach of the Webster chess team from 2012 until her retirement in 2021. The team's coach, Lê Quang Liêm, is a Webster alumnus and contributed to the chess team's President's Cup wins four years in a row from 2014 to 2017. He became a Grandmaster at just 15 years old and is currently the number 20 ranked chess player in the world.

Due to this history of excellence in chess, in 2022, Webster began offering a “Chess in Education” minor consisting of 18 credit hours of instruction on subjects ranging from the history of chess to the psychology, strategy, and global perspectives of chess. The program aims to prepare students to become future chess educators. With this course of study, Webster became the first university in the United States to offer a formal chess degree program.

In May 2026, Webster University announced that it would discontinue the SPICE chess program, citing financial concerns and challenges involving international student visas. The decision drew criticism from members of the chess community and former program leaders due to the team's national prominence and historical success.

== Student life ==
As of 2024, Webster has about 2,000 undergraduate students and about 8,000 graduate students. Webster students' SAT score range was 1120–1245 and the ACT range was 18–25. Students come from 50 U.S. states and more than 130 countries.

Webster University St. Louis has a student newspaper called The Journal and a student radio station called The Galaxy. The Galaxy was re-launched online in 2007. Webster University has other e-newsletters such as Webster Today and departmental publications.

In 2009, Webster University allowed Greek organizations on its St. Louis campus, the only existing example being the Gamma Zeta chapter of Delta Phi Epsilon.

== Notable people ==
=== Faculty ===
Professors for the university have included chess grandmaster Susan Polgar, actor/dancer Lara Teeter, dancer Alicia Graf Mack, poet David Clewell, video artist Van McElwee, political scientists Daniel Hellinger and Johannes Pollak, United Nations Special Rapporteur for Violence Against Women Rashida Manjoo, activist and writer Sulak Sivaraksa, sound engineer Bill Porter, Holocaust scholar Harry J. Cargas, and former Missouri Governor Bob Holden.

=== Alumni ===
There were over 190,000 alumni as of 2017. They include:

- Lloyd James Austin III, 28th United States Secretary of Defense and Army four-star general
- Luis Avila, Purple Heart recipient, adaptive athlete and singer
- John Boccieri, U.S. Congressman
- Ann Walsh Bradley, Wisconsin State Supreme Court justice
- William Broad, Pulitzer Prize-winning reporter for The New York Times
- Norbert Leo Butz, Tony Award-winning actor
- Eileen Collins, astronaut
- Debra Drexler, painter, installation artist, curator
- Mary Alice Dwyer-Dobbin, television producer
- Geraldine George, Defense Minister of Liberia
- Nathan Lee Graham, actor and cabaret artist
- Sidney M. Gutierrez, astronaut
- Clarence Harmon, former mayor and chief of police for St. Louis
- Jane Ellen Ibur, poet and arts educator
- R. Alan King, military veteran (Panama and Iraq) and author of Twice Armed: An American Soldier's Battle for Hearts and Minds in Iraq – Winner of 2008 William E. Colby Award
- Jenifer Lewis, television, screen, and stage actress
- Sandra Mansour, fashion designer
- Marsha Mason, four-time Academy Award-nominated actress
- Jerry Mitchell, Tony Award-winning choreographer and director
- Leyna Nguyen, news anchor and three-time Emmy awardee
- Richard Ojeda, Bronze Star recipient, United States Army veteran of Afghan and Iraq conflicts, and West Virginia state senator
- Rob Riggle, comedian, television star and sports commentator
- Roderick Royal, mayor of Birmingham, Alabama
- Phyllis J. Wilson, 5th Command Chief Warrant Officer of the US Army Reserve and President of the Military Women's Memorial
- Susilo Bambang Yudhoyono, president of Indonesia
