= Kurita Chodō =

Japanese poet

- Born: 21 August 1749 Matsuyama, Ehime, Japan
- Died: 21 August 1814 (aged 65) Mitarai-jima, Hiroshima Japan
- Occupation: poet
- Genre: poetry

Kurita Chodō (栗田 樗堂; 21 August 1749 – 21 August 1814), was a Japanese poet of the Edo period (1600–1867), regarded as a leading figure in poetry world in Matsuyama former Iyo Province.

== Life ==
Gotō Masanori, commonly called Teizō, was born in 1749 in Iyo now Matsuyama, and married into the Kurita family at the age of 17. The Kurita and Gotō family both owned prosperous sake brewery, they served Katō Kiyomasa, who built Matsuyama Castle. Chodō became the 7th owner of the brewery when he was 23. Around this time, under the encouragement of his wife and his father-in-law who were haiku poet, he began to compose his haiku. For his pen name, he took “Cho (樗). In Japan, Choboku (樗木) is commonly known as a useless tree. This is his expression of his determination to give up fame and wealth.

Besides his successful brewery owner and haiku poet career, Chodō performed an important role in the Matsuyama Clan. He was respected by many people. Even after that, he continued to make haiku and became the central figure of Haiku society in Iyo. He built Kōshin-an in 1800 to devote himself to haiku activities, and retired from governmental service. Kobayashi Issa, one of the greatest haiku poets of their period, was an important friend of Kurita Chodō. Issa was younger than Chodō by fourteen years, and Chodō gave him guidance about haiku. Issa visited his house in 1795 and 1796 and they enjoyed composing haiku together. Their friendship lasted until Chodō’s death. In 1807, Chodō moved to Mitarai-jima, a small island of former Aki Province, now Hiroshima prefecture where he spent the rest of his days. He died at sixty-five in 1814.

== Literary career ==
Masaoka Shiki praised Chodō as the best poet of their age in Iyo. Chodō was widely known as a famous haiku poet Kato Kyodai’s disciple, having a connection with poets in Edo, Kamigata, and Owari province.

His first travel writing, Tsumajirushi (爪じるし) where he kept his journal during his trip to Setouchi, Kii, Yamato and Kyoto, was completed in 1787. When Kobayashi Issa visited Chodō, they enjoyed making poems Uguisu no maki (鶯の巻) together. At the age of 50, he composed Tsukiyo saushi (月夜さうし). Successfully, he combined “grace” in Tsurezuregusa (The Harvest of Leisure), written by the monk Yoshida Kenkō with everyday reality. Moreover, in 1805, five years after his building of Kōshin-an, he wrote about his reclusive life in Kōshin-an in a journal Kōshin-an-ki (庚申庵記).

== See also ==
- Haiku
- Kobayashi Issa
