= Sisters of Loretto =

Catholic religious institute

Coordinates: 37°39′50.6″N 85°23′54.67″W

- Abbreviation: SL
- Established: 1812; 214 years ago
- Location: Nerinx, Kentucky
- Region served: Americas and Asia
- President: Barbara Nicholas SL
- Main organ: Loretto Magazine
- Affiliations: Catholic
- Website: LorettoCommunity.org
- Remarks: The Loretto Community includes both vowed members and committed co-members.

The Sisters of Loretto or the Loretto Community is a Catholic religious institute that strives "to bring the healing Spirit of God into our world." Founded in the United States in 1812 and based in the rural community of Nerinx, Kentucky, the organization has communities in 16 US states and in Bolivia, Chile, China, Ghana, Pakistan, and Peru.

== History ==
The Sisters of Loretto were founded in 1812 by three women, Mary Rhodes, Ann Havern, and Christina Stuart, under the guidance of Fr Charles Nerinckx in Kentucky as The Little Society of the Friends of Mary at the Foot of the Cross. Their mission was to educate the poor children of the frontier. They were an early group to receive Black novices, including Clare Morgan as a founding member in 1812, but they segregated many of them in various ways and most eventually were released from their vows. The order is also known to have owned slaves.

When the community was formed into a religious congregation, it was renamed the Sisters of Loretto at the Foot of the Cross. Mother Praxedes Carty updated the constitution of the Sisters of Loretto with Rome in the early 1900s.

The Sisters were early collaborators with the Jesuits in their missionary endeavors among the native Americans. The work of the Sisters spread to the American Southwest during the 1870s, as the Sisters opened a Loretto Academy in Santa Fe, New Mexico. (This school is the site of the famed staircase in the former school chapel, believed by some to have been built through supernatural intervention.) They also began an all-girls school in Montgomery, AL, in 1873, called Loretto High.

The Sisters gained a reputation for educational innovation, as well as racial and religious tolerance, which created a strong interest in having their services. By the 1890s they had opened a girls' school in St. Paul, Kansas, in the Diocese of Wichita, and in 1899 were invited to work in the Diocese of Kansas City in Missouri, where they first started teaching in parochial schools of the city and opened a Loretto Academy in 1901. The Sisters also worked in Iowa and had a mission school for the children of the Osage nation in Oklahoma. The Sisters founded two colleges: Loretto Heights College in Denver (founded as an academy in 1891 and becoming a college in 1918) and Loretto College in Webster Groves, Missouri (later known as Webster College, now known as Webster University), in 1915. The campus in Denver has changed hands several times in recent years and now is home to affordable housing units in Pancratia Lofts, and will offer the May Bonfils Stanton Theater and the Commún Community Center in the future. In 2012 the Sisters received the Civis Princeps award from Regis University, with mention of their founding 27 schools in Colorado, ten still in operation, including St. Mary’s Academy which bestowed the first high school diploma in the Colorado territory in 1875. In addition the Sisters founded 21 nonprofits in Colorado including Earthlinks, Project WISE, and the Women’s Bean Project.

== Organization ==
In recent years, the institute has diffused into a larger Loretto Community, which includes the Loretto Sisters with vows and members without religious vows, as well as volunteers. These young adult volunteers serve in New York City, Washington, DC, and St. Louis, MO.

In June 2005, the Loretto Community dedicated the Colorado affordable-housing community of Mount Loretto, built in collaboration with the Archdiocese of Denver. In order to advance its charitable activities, the group holds NGO status with the United Nations. Strongly committed to social justice, the Loretto Community opposes nuclear weaponry and proliferation, and advocates for migrant workers and torture victims of oppressive regimes.

Other works of the Loretto Community include the Loretto Earth Network, an environmentalist education and activism group. A Disarmament Committee lobbies against nuclear weapons, landmines, and militarism, and in favor of "develop[ing] a culture of peace." The Community also operates two facilities which offer spiritual retreats Nerinx.

== Publications ==
The Loretto Community publishes Loretto Magazine, Loretto Earth Network News, and the Justice and Peace Newsletter.
