= Tensha-en =

Garden in Uwajima, Japan

- 天赦園
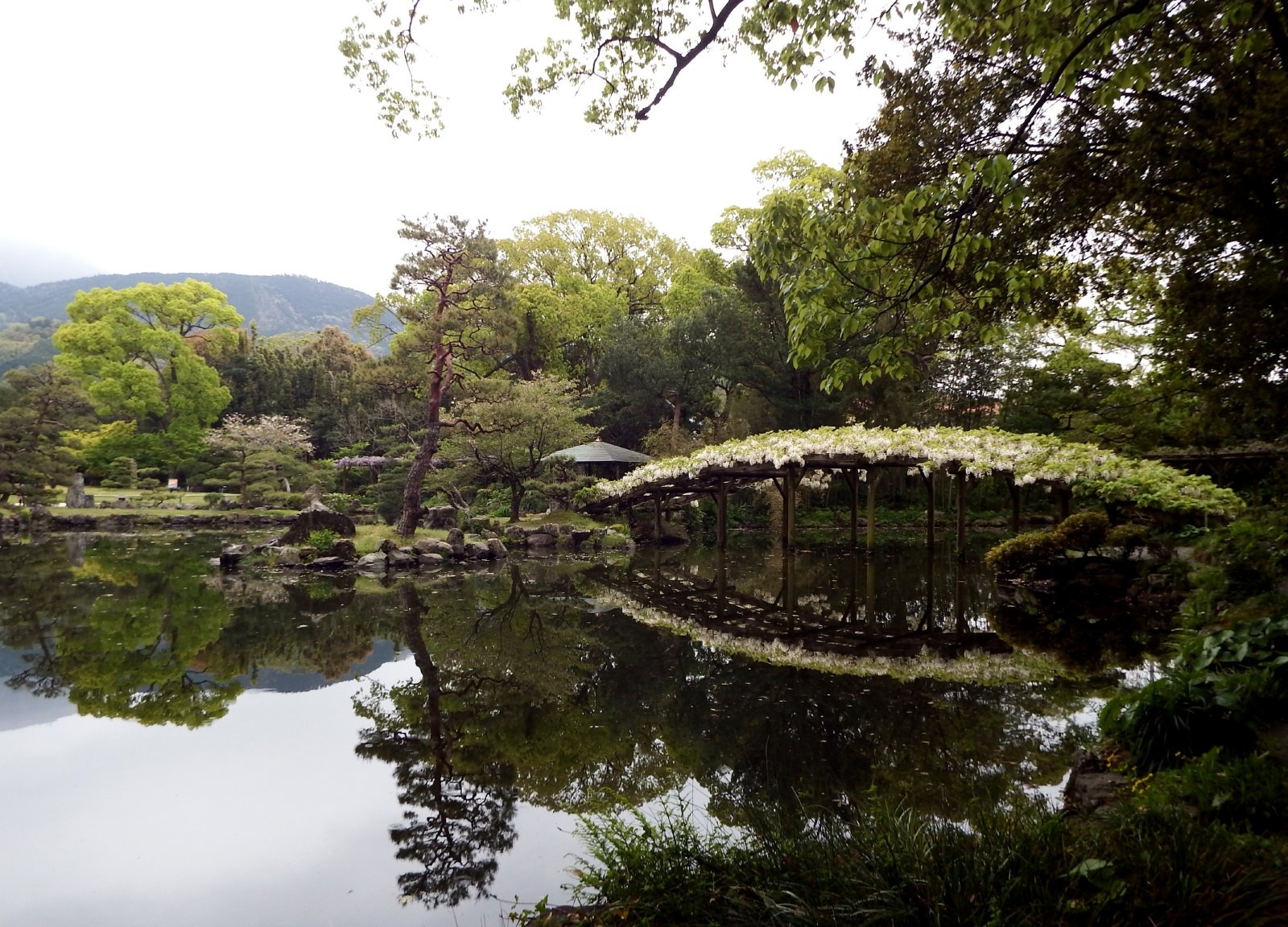

- Location within Ehime Prefecture Location within Japan
- Type: Japanese garden
- Location: Uwajima, Ehime, Japan
- Coordinates: 33°12′56″N 132°33′40″E
- National Place of Scenic Beauty

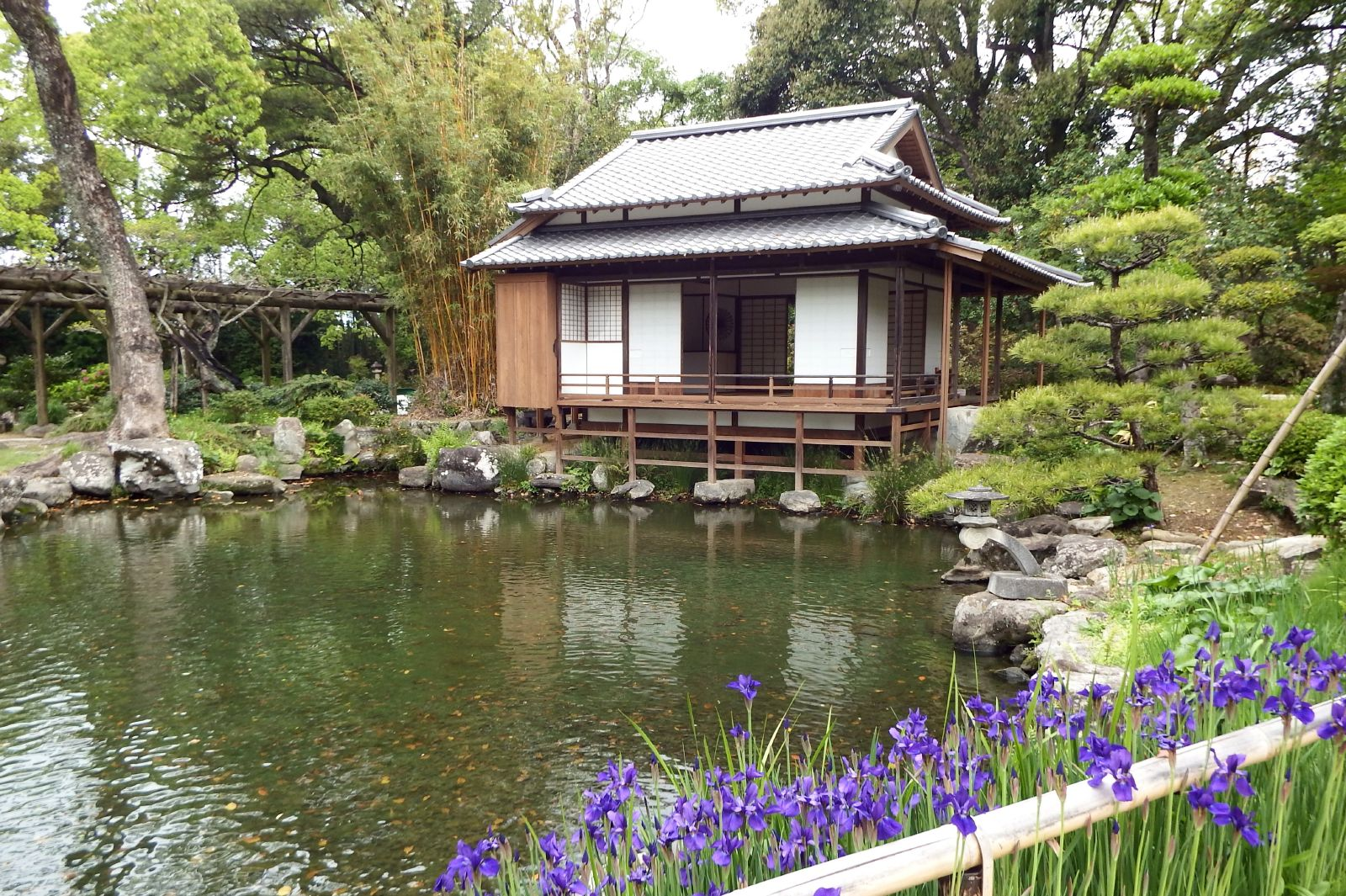
Harusametei pavilion

Tensha-en (天赦園) is a Japanese garden located in the city of Uwajima, Ehime south of Uwajima Castle on the island of Shikoku. Built by Date Munetada, the 7th daimyō of Uwajima Domain, in 1866, it is one of the last gardens built by a daimyō.

== History ==
In 1672, the 2nd daimyō of Uwajima, Date Munetoshi, reclaimed land next to Uwajima Castle for a sea-side palace, which eventually became the site of the garden. Date Munetada, who had an exceptionally long tenure, built a "South Palace" on this site as his retirement villa. Tensha-en is an example of borrowed scenery (Japanese: 借景, shakkei), framed by Mount Onigajo and the surrounding mountain range. It includes a pond in the shape of the kanji for 'heart' (心) and features a calligraphy room called "Harusametei" (春雨亭) in the center of the garden. It is adjacent to the Uwajima City Date Museum, southwest of Uwajima Castle.

== Overview ==
The name of the shrine comes from a kanshi poem written by Date Masamune (馬上少年過 世平白髪多 残躯天所赦 不楽是如何), referring to a place of heavenly forgiveness. After a visit from Emperor Hirohito and Empress Nagako in 1966, Tensha-en was designated as a National Place of Scenic Beauty in 1968. Over twenty species of bamboo, as well as wisteria and iris, can be found in the garden. The arched bridge over the pond is notable for being lined with nobori-fuji, ascending wisteria, which is popular with tourists in April when the flowers are in bloom.

== See also ==
- List of Places of Scenic Beauty of Japan (Ehime)
