= Uwajima City Historical Museum =

- 宇和島市立歴史資料館
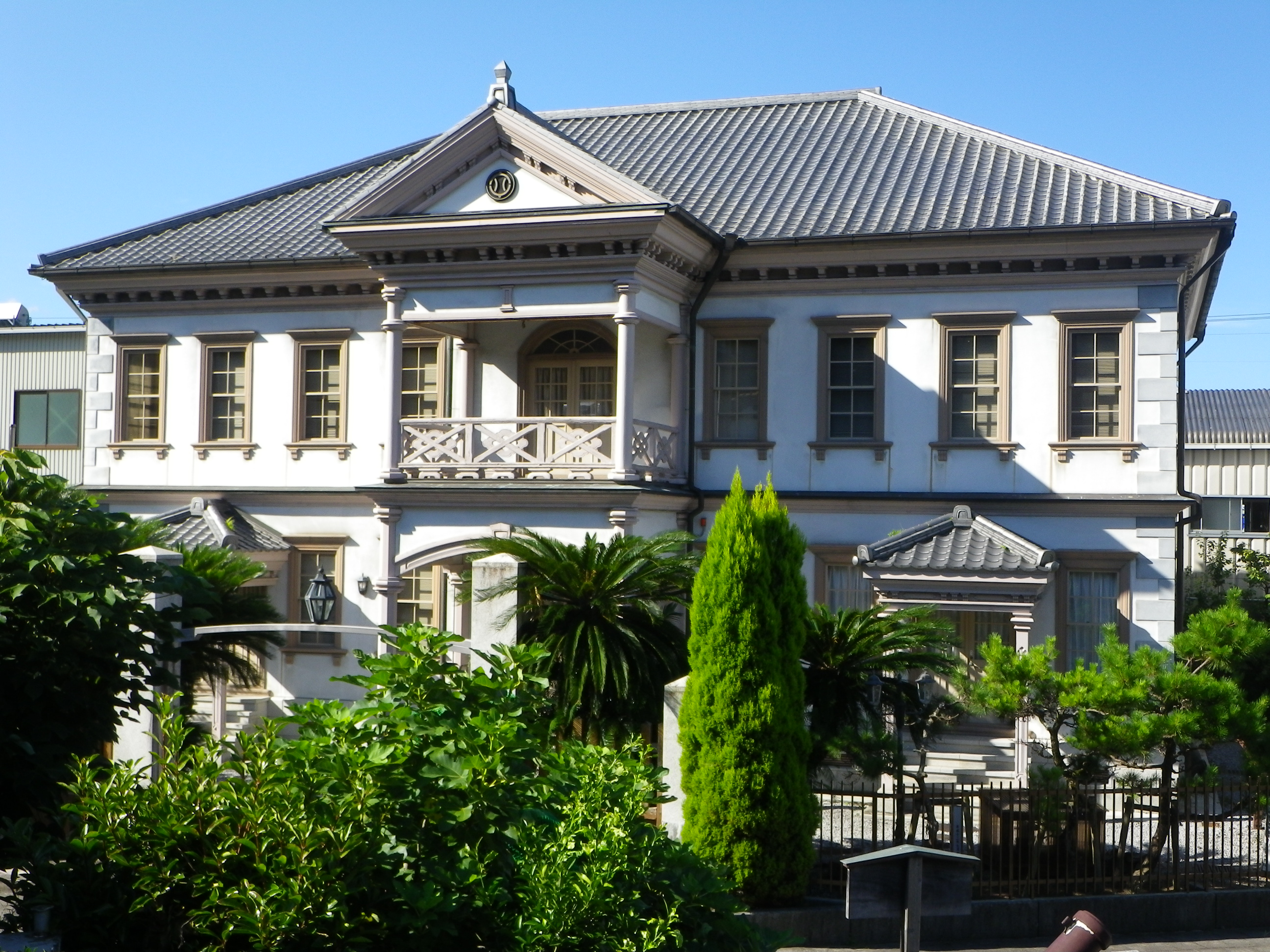

General information
- Location: 2-4-36 Sumiyoshi-chō, Uwajima, Ehime Prefecture, Japan
- Coordinates: 33°13′35″N 132°33′17″E
- Opened: March 1992

Website
- Official website

The Uwajima City Historical Museum (宇和島市立歴史資料館, Uwajima Shiritsu Rekisi Shiryōkan) opened in Uwajima, Ehime Prefecture, Japan in 1992. The Western-style building in which the museum is housed dates to 1884 and is a Registered Tangible Cultural Property. Having started out as the Uwajima Police Station in the Hirōkoji district of Uwajima, in 1953 the building was relocated to Nishiumi, now Ainan, where until January 1990 it served as the town hall. In March 1992 the building was returned to Uwajima and its current site near the Kabasaki Battery (樺崎砲台跡), where it has served as a museum dedicated to the history of Uwajima.

== See also ==
- Uwajima City Date Museum
- List of Historic Sites of Japan (Ehime)
- List of Cultural Properties of Japan - paintings (Ehime)
- Uwajima Castle
