= List of cultural properties of Japan – paintings (Ehime) =

This list is of the cultural properties of Japan designated in the category of paintings (絵画, kaiga) for the Prefecture of Ehime.

== National Cultural Properties ==
As of 1 July 2019, one Important Cultural Property has been designated, being of national significance.

Property	Date	Municipality	Ownership	Comments	Image	Dimensions	Coordinates	Ref.
Toyotomi Hideyoshi, colour on silk 絹本著色豊臣秀吉像 kenpon chakushoku Toyotomi Hideyoshi zō	1599	Uwajima	Uwajima Date Cultural Preservation Society (kept at Uwajima City Date Museum)	inscribed by Saishō Seishō (西笑承兌)		131.9 centimetres (51.9 in) by 103.6 centimetres (40.8 in)	33°12′57″N 132°33′46″E	

== Prefectural Cultural Properties ==
As of 23 July 2019, fourteen properties have been designated at a prefectural level.

Property	Date	Municipality	Ownership	Comments	Image	Dimensions	Coordinates	Ref.
Kōbō Daishi, colour on silk 絹本著色弘法大師像 kenpon chakushoku Kōbō Daishi zō	Kamakura period	Matsuyama	Taisan-ji			113 centimetres (44 in) by 118 centimetres (46 in)	33°53′06″N 132°42′54″E	
Nirvana painting, colour on silk and hair 絹本及び毛髪地著色仏涅槃図 kenpon oyobi mōhatsu ji chakushoku hotoke nehan zu	Kamakura period	Matsuyama	Ishite-ji	the long hair of female devotees was mixed with the silk		206.5 centimetres (81.3 in) by 157.5 centimetres (62.0 in)	33°50′51″N 132°47′50″E	
Tea Style Screens 製茶風俗図屏風 seicha fūzoku zu byōbu	early Edo period	Matsuyama	The Museum of Art, Ehime	pair of six panel screens by Matsumoto Sansetsu (松本山雪)		161.5 centimetres (63.6 in) by 358 centimetres (141 in)	33°50′24″N 132°45′43″E	
Yanagi-Bashi, colour with gold ground on paper 紙本金地著色柳橋図 shihon kinji chakushoku yanagi bashi zu		Imabari	Iyo Kokubun-ji (伊予国分寺)				34°01′34″N 133°01′32″E	
Tomita Tomonobu 富田知信画像; Tomita Tomonobu gazō	Momoyama period	Uwajima	Dairyū-ji (大隆寺)	with gasan of 1599 by Shunoku Soen (春屋宗園)		91 centimetres (36 in) by 44.7 centimetres (17.6 in)	33°12′55″N 132°34′35″E	
Tomita Nobutaka 富田信高画像; Tomita Nobutaka gazō	early Edo period	Uwajima	Dairyū-ji (大隆寺)	with gasan of 1637		91 centimetres (36 in) by 43.7 centimetres (17.2 in)	33°12′55″N 132°34′35″E	
Monju, ink on silk 絹本墨画騎獅文殊図 kenpon bokuga kishi Monju zu	Nanboku-chō period	Ōzu	Ōzu City (kept at the Ōzu City Museum (大洲市立博物館))			62 centimetres (24 in) by 35 centimetres (14 in)	33°30′49″N 132°32′46″E	
Shaka Triad with Sixteen Arhats, colour on silk 絹本著色釈迦三尊及び十六羅漢図 kenpon chakushoku Shaka sanzon oyobi jūroku rakan zu	Southern Song	Ōzu	Nyohō-ji (如法寺) (kept at the Ōzu City Museum (大洲市立博物館))	three scrolls		91 centimetres (36 in) by 40 centimetres (16 in)	33°30′49″N 132°32′46″E	
Getsuan Sōkō, colour on silk 絹本著色月庵宗光像 kenpon chakushoku Getsuan Sōkō zō	Nanboku-chō period	Matsuyama	Saimyō-ji (最明寺)			92 centimetres (36 in) by 38 centimetres (15 in)	33°59′07″N 132°47′43″E	
Nirvana Painting and Mandala of the Two Realms 涅槃像及び両界曼荼羅 nehanzō oyobi ryōkai mandara	Edo period	Saijō	Tokuzō-ji (徳蔵寺)	3 scrolls		178 centimetres (70 in) by 123 centimetres (48 in) - 101 centimetres (40 in) by 86 centimetres (34 in)	33°55′13″N 133°06′28″E	
Chigo Daishi, colour on silk 絹本著色稚児大師像 kenpon chakushoku Chigo Daishi zō	late Kamakura period	Imabari	Kōrin-ji (光林寺)	Kukai as a child		76.5 centimetres (30.1 in) by 40.2 centimetres (15.8 in)	34°00′23″N 132°57′02″E	
Kokan Shiren, colour on silk 絹本著色虎関師錬像 kenpon chakushoku Kokan Shiren zō	early Muromachi period	Seiyo	Jōjō-ji (常定寺) (kept at Museum of Ehime History and Culture)			113 centimetres (44 in) by 55 centimetres (22 in)	33°21′50″N 132°31′05″E	
Kaitō Oshō, colour on silk 絹本著色回塘和尚像 kenpon chakushoku Kaitō oshō zō	Muromachi period	Seiyo	Jōjō-ji (常定寺) (kept at Museum of Ehime History and Culture)			113 centimetres (44 in) by 55 centimetres (22 in)	33°21′50″N 132°31′05″E	
Kumano Mandala, colour on silk 絹本著色熊野曼荼羅図 kenpon chakushoku Kumano mandara zu	Muromachi period	Seiyo	Meiseki-ji (明石寺)			98.5 centimetres (38.8 in) by 38.5 centimetres (15.2 in)	33°22′09″N 132°31′08″E	

== See also ==
- Cultural Properties of Japan
- List of National Treasures of Japan (paintings)
- Japanese painting
- List of Historic Sites of Japan (Ehime)
