= The Museum of Art, Ehime =

- 愛媛県美術館
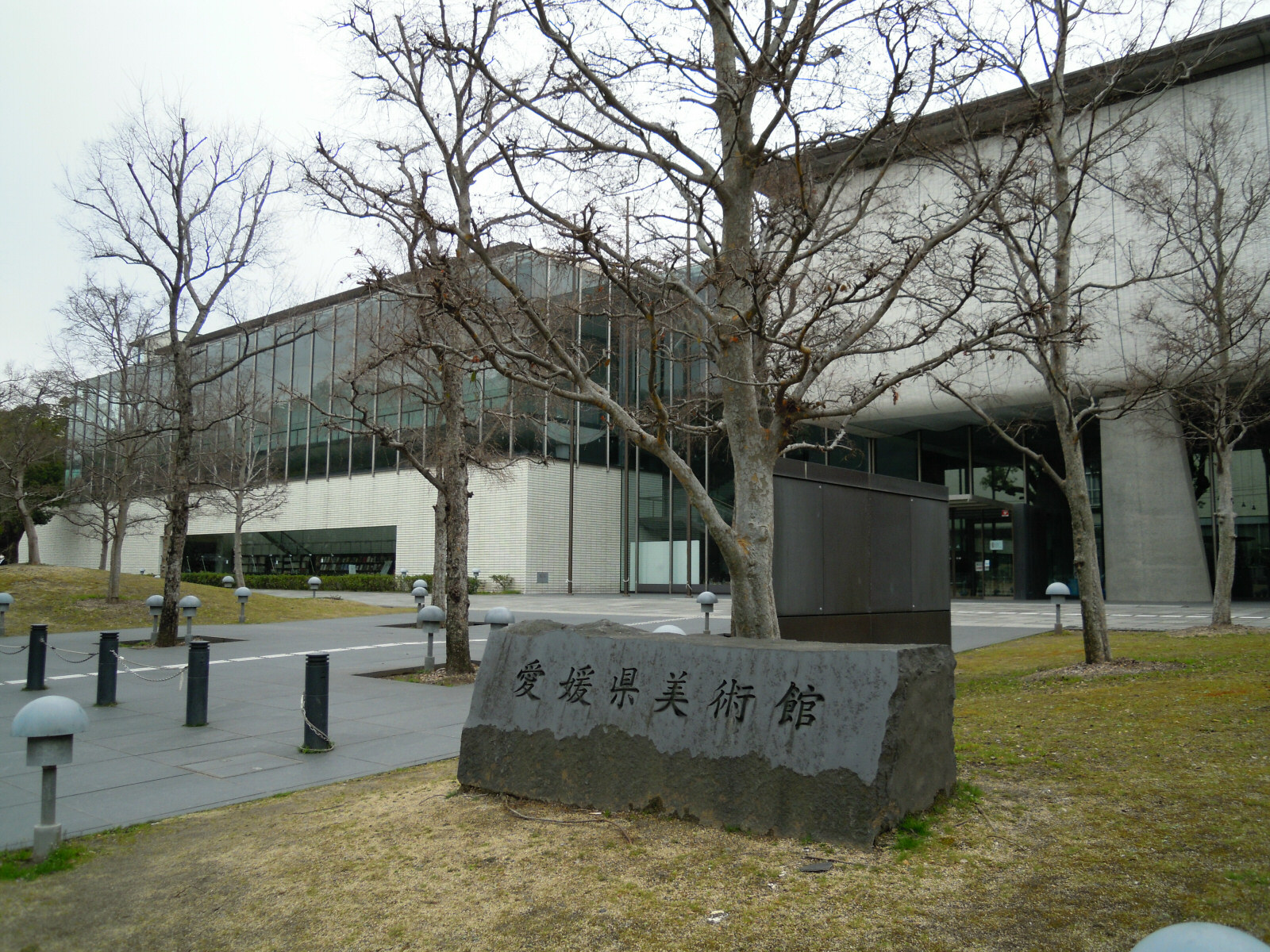
- Interactive map of the The Museum of Art, Ehime area

General information
- Location: Horinouchinai, Matsuyama, Ehime Prefecture, Japan
- Coordinates: 33°50′26″N 132°45′44″E
- Opened: 1970
- Renovated: October 1998

Website
- Official website

The Museum of Art, Ehime (愛媛県美術館, Ehime-ken Bijutsukan) opened in the grounds of Matsuyama Castle in Matsuyama, Ehime Prefecture, Japan in 1998, as the successor to the Ehime Prefectural Museum of Art (愛媛県立美術館), which opened in 1970. The collection of some 11,900 works includes paintings by Monet and Cezanne, nihonga practitioners Yukihiko Yasuda and Yokoyama Taikan, and yōga masters Nakamura Tsune and Yasui Sōtarō, as well as pieces by local artists, including Sugiura Hisui and Masamu Yanase (柳瀬正夢).

== See also ==
- Museum of Ehime History and Culture
- List of Cultural Properties of Japan - paintings (Ehime)
