= List of places of scenic beauty of Japan (Ehime) =

This is a list of the places of scenic beauty of Japan located within the Prefecture of Ehime.

== National Places of Scenic Beauty ==
As of 19 June 2026, fourteen Places have been designated at a national level.

Place	Municipality	Comments	Image	Coordinates	Type	Ref.
Iwaya 岩屋; Iwaya	Kumakōgen			33°39′35″N 132°58′53″E	5	
Furu-Iwaya 古岩屋; Furu-Iwaya	Kumakōgen			33°40′06″N 132°58′29″E	5	
Shishimagahara 志島ヶ原; Shishimagahara	Imabari			34°01′05″N 133°02′41″E	8	
Senbiki-no-Sakura 千疋のサクラ; Senbiki-no-sakura	Imabari			33°58′29″N 132°57′02″E	3	
Ōmishima 大三島; Ōmishima	Imabari			34°14′21″N 133°00′57″E	8, 10	
Tensha-en 天赦園; Tensha-en	Uwajima			33°12′56″N 132°33′38″E	1	
Hashihama 波止浜; Hashihama	Imabari			34°07′06″N 132°58′19″E	8	
Mount Yawata 八幡山; Yawata-yama	Imabari			34°08′24″N 133°02′48″E	11	
Hōkoku-ji Gardens 保国寺庭園; Hōkokuji teien	Saijō			33°53′28″N 133°11′07″E	1	
Omogo-kei 面河渓; Omogo-kei	Kumakōgen			33°44′10″N 133°06′54″E	5, 6	
Hoshigamori (Yokomine-ji Mount Ishizuchi Worship Site) 星ヶ森(横峰寺石鎚山遥拝所); Hoshigamori (Yokomineji Ishizuchisan yōhaijo)	Saijō			33°50′08″N 133°06′28″E		
Former Hirose Family Gardens 旧広瀬氏庭園; Kyū-Hirose-shi teien	Niihama	at the Hirose Memorial Museum (広瀬歴史記念館)		33°57′37″N 133°17′00″E		
Garyū Sansō Gardens 臥龍山荘庭園; Garyū sansō teien	Ōzu			33°30′23″N 132°33′00″E		
Shirai Falls 白猪の滝; Shirai-no-taki	Tōon			33°45′31″N 132°58′11″E		

== Prefectural Places of Scenic Beauty ==
As of 1 May 2025, eleven Places have been designated at a prefectural level.

Place	Municipality	Comments	Image	Coordinates	Type	Ref.
Seigō-ji Gardens 西江寺庭園; Seigōji teien	Uwajima			33°13′10″N 132°34′18″E		
Besshi Line 別子ライン; Besshi-rain	Niihama			33°54′03″N 133°18′37″E		
Lake Kinsha - Tomisato Valley 金砂湖及び富郷渓谷; Kinsha-ko oyobi Tomisato-keikoku	Shikokuchūō			33°55′53″N 133°32′36″E		
Nishiyama 西山; Nishi-yama	Seiyo			33°54′21″N 133°01′31″E		
Hōōgahara 法王ケ原; Hōōgahara	Kamijima			34°15′10″N 133°12′31″E		
Mount Mikushi 御串山; Mikushi-yama	Imabari			34°14′50″N 132°59′19″E		
Mount Sugō 菅生山; Sugō-san	Kumakōgen			33°39′39″N 132°54′43″E		
Mount Mimido 御三戸嶽; Mimido-dake	Kumakōgen			33°36′50″N 132°58′39″E		
Kinzan Shusseki-ji 金山出石寺; Kinzan Shussekiji	Ōzu			33°32′09″N 132°27′56″E		
Mitaki Castle Site 三滝城跡; Mitaki-jō seki	Seiyo	also a Prefectural Historic Site		33°24′34″N 132°47′57″E		
Kashima 鹿島; Kashima	Ainan			32°56′40″N 132°26′48″E		

== Municipal Places of Scenic Beauty ==
As of 1 May 2025, thirty Places have been designated at a municipal level, including:

Place	Municipality	Comments	Image	Coordinates	Type	Ref.
Namegawa Valley 滑川渓谷; Name-gawa keikoku	Tōon			33°46′03″N 133°00′45″E		
Karakai Falls 唐岬の滝; Karakai no taki	Tōon			33°44′58″N 132°58′52″E		
Meigen-ji Gardens 明源寺庭園; Meigenji teien	Uwajima			33°13′07″N 132°34′16″E		
Kongōzan Gardens 金剛山庭園; Kongōzan teien	Uwajima			33°12′55″N 132°34′35″E		
Ryūgezan Gardens 龍華山庭園; Ryūgezan teien	Uwajima			33°13′02″N 132°34′26″E		

== Registered Places of Scenic Beauty ==
As of 1 June 2026, five Monuments have been registered (as opposed to designated) as Places of Scenic Beauty at a national level.

Site	Municipality	Comments	Image	Coordinates	Type	Ref.
Hyotan-jima 瓢箪島; Hyotan-Jima	Imabari, Onomichi			34°09′57″N 133°19′05″E		
Shijūshima 四十島; Shijūshima	Matsuyama			33°52′43″N 132°41′49″E		
Yatsuzuka Family Gardens 八束氏庭園; Yatsuzuka-shi teien	Matsuyama			33°50′37″N 132°46′53″E		
Kamihayashi no Kazaana 上林の風穴; Kamihayashi no kazaana	Matsuyama			33°43′24″N 132°53′10″E		
Former Yagi Shōten Main Store Gardens 旧八木商店本店庭園 kyū-Yagi shōten honten teien	Imabari			34°06′27″N 132°58′03″E		

== See also ==
- Cultural Properties of Japan
- List of Historic Sites of Japan (Ehime)
- List of parks and gardens of Ehime Prefecture
