= Meiseki-ji =

- 明石寺
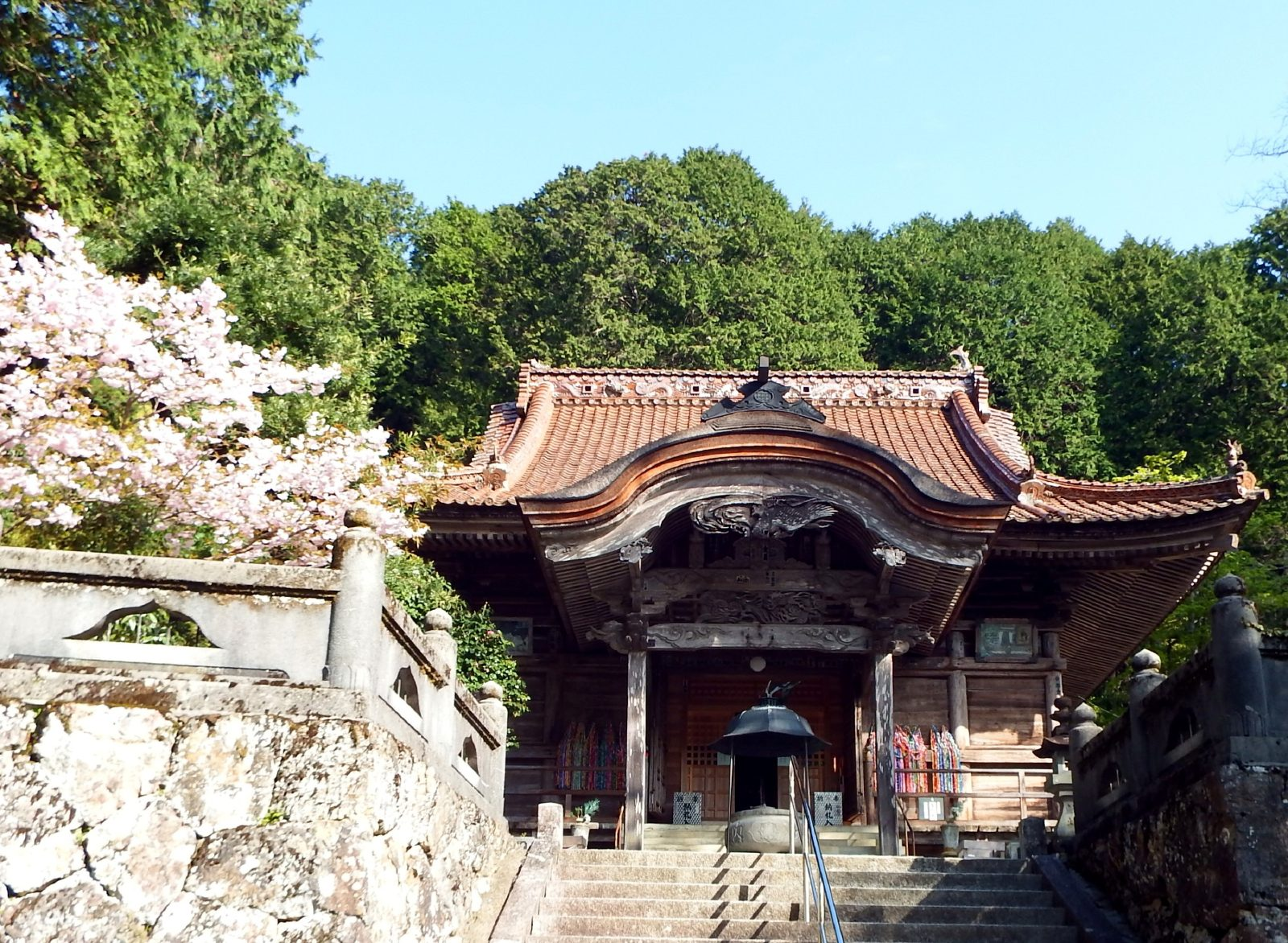
- Main Hall

Religion
- Affiliation: Buddhism other_info =: Sect: [[]]
- Deity: Senju Kannon

Location
- Location: 33°22′9.2″N 132°31′8.3″E
- Country: Japan
- Interactive map of Meiseki-ji

Meiseki-ji (Japanese: 明石寺) is a temple belonging to the Tendai Jimon sect, located in Seiyo City, Ehime Prefecture. Its formal mountain name is Genkōzan, and its institutional name is Enshuin. The main image is of Senju Kannon. It serves as the Temple #43rd on the Shikoku 88 temple pilgrimage.

Mantra of the Principal Deity: *Om Vajra Dharma Hrih Svaha* Pilgrimage Verse: "I have heard that, through the wondrous vow of the Thousand-Armed One, even a massive boulder is lifted as lightly as a pebble." This temple serves as an official certification site; pilgrims may request—for a fee—to have a formal certificate (diploma) issued to attest to the "Kechi-gan" (Completion of the Pilgrimage) of the Shikoku 88-Temple route. (The certificate will be mailed to you at a later date.)

== Overview ==
Located at the foot of the mountain beside the entrance are several small circular burial mounds (Akashiji Kofun Nos. 1 through 3) dating back to the Kofun period, indicating that this area has long been a developed region with an advanced civilization. Enshrined atop Mt. Oshino (elevation 388 m)—which rises directly behind the temple—is a *bunrei* (branch spirit) of Shinoyama Gongen, a deity revered in the Nanyo region; the temple precincts themselves extend across the mountain's eastern slopes. The elevation of the temple proper (the *fudasho*) is 282 meters. This site is regarded as a sacred place associated with a legend in which Kannon Bodhisattva, having transformed into a maiden to carry a massive boulder, vanished at the break of dawn, leaving the stone behind (the site has since been venerated as the abode of Hakuō Gongen). During the medieval period, after Uwa District became a *shōen* (manor) under the control of the Saionji clan, nearby strongholds such as Matsuba Castle and Kurose Castle were constructed; consequently, the temple maintained strong ties with the clan. Because the temple’s administration continued to be passed down through hereditary succession even after the Saionji clan’s demise, a wealth of cultural assets—including historical documents, Buddhist statues, and calligraphy and paintings—have survived to the present day without being scattered or lost.

== History ==
According to the *Yusho Oboegaki* (Memorandum on Origins, written in 1783), the temple was founded in the 6th century by the priest Shōchō-shōnin, acting on the imperial wish of Emperor Kinmei, to enshrine a statue of the Thousand-armed Kannon Bodhisattva that had been brought over from Tang China. The text further states that in Tenpyō 6 (734), Jugen-gyōja—the fifth successor to En no Gyōja—invited the Twelve Shrine Gongen deities from Kumano and established twelve monastic quarters (*jūnibō*), thereby transforming the site into a central training ground for Shugendō. Later, when the temple buildings fell into disrepair, Kōbō-Daishi (Kūkai) is said to have restored them by enshrining a sutra he had personally transcribed in gold ink on indigo-dyed paper. However, the *Akashidera Sonzō Saikō Kanjinjō* (Petition for the Restoration of Akashidera’s Sacred Images, written in 1689) places the enshrinement of the Kannon statue and the invitation of the Kumano Gongen deities in Tenpyō 6 (734), but dates the establishment of the twelve monastic quarters to Kōnin 13 (822). Furthermore, the *Uwa Kyūki* (Old Records of Uwa, written in 1681) dates the invitation of the Kumano Twelve Shrine Gongen deities to Jōwa 3 (836). Nevertheless, given that the temple's current principal image—the Thousand-armed Kannon—is a work dating to the late Heian period, it is plausible that the invitation of the Twelve Shrine Gongen deities occurred during the same era, and that they were created to serve as the *Honji-butsu* (original Buddhist deities) corresponding to the local Shinto deities.

Subsequently, in Kenkyū 5 (1194), Minamoto no Yoritomo established an Amida Hall and constructed a sutra mound to pray for the repose of the soul of Ike no Zenni—the woman who had saved his life. He further restored the temple complex by undertaking repairs to its buildings, and at that time, the temple's *sangō* (mountain name) was changed from Genkō-zan to Genkō-zan (using a different Chinese character for "Gen"). The temple continued to enjoy the fervent devotion of the samurai class; during the Muromachi period, it served as a designated prayer temple for the Saionji clan of Iyo Province. However, in 1578, when Toyotomi Hideyoshi's direct retainer Toda Katsutaka became the *daimyō* (feudal lord) of the Nanyo region, the Saionji clan was annihilated. Consequently, the temple itself faced a crisis of institutional collapse; however, *Ue-no-bō*—one of the twelve monastic quarters serving as the temple's *bettō* (administrator)—stepped forward to assume the role of the 38th head priest of Akashidera, thereby averting its demise. In 1665, *Ue-no-bō* was officially recognized as the legitimate successor, establishing a hereditary lineage among Shugendō practitioners that has continued uninterrupted to the present day. In 1638, while staying at this temple during a pilgrimage, Imperial Prince Kūshō bestowed the name "Shigure-zakura" (Showery Cherry Tree) upon the cherry tree standing before the gate of the Kami-no-bō quarters. When the Kyoto-based monk Chōzen visited during his own pilgrimage in 1653, the Main Hall had fallen into disrepair—rotting and leaning precariously—and the principal image had been relocated to the Yakushi Hall. However, in the 12th year of the Kanbun era (1672), Date Munetoshi—the Lord of the Uwajima Domain—constructed the Niō Gate and the Kannon Hall, and subsequently restored the temple's other structures.

In the early years of the Meiji era, the Kumano Jūnisha Gongen shrine—which had historically been integrated with the temple—was separated from it in accordance with the government's policy of separating Shinto and Buddhism; a fence was subsequently erected between the shrine grounds and the temple's Main Hall. In the fifth year of the Showa era (1930), the Haiden (Hall of Worship) and Noritoden (Hall of Ritual Prayers) of the Kumano Shrine were constructed on the grounds immediately below the existing structures.

== Temple Name ==
Although its original name was Ageishi-ji, it is currently referred to as Meiseki-ji. The Uwa Kyūki (Old Records of Uwa), compiled in 1681, notes: "A devotional verse contains the phrase '...easily age-ishi [lifted stone]'; if so, ought the temple's name not be written as Ageishi-ji?" Furthermore, regarding the names of the temple's head priests: beginning with the 37th abbot, "Kaichō," followed by the 38th, "Kaichō," and continuing through to the 42nd, "Shinchō," the naming convention—ending in the suffix "-chō"—has persisted to the present day. Historically, these priests were known as the "Akashi Bettō [Akashi Chief Priest] —chō" and possessed no surname; however, following the Meiji Restoration, a surname was formally adopted, and the family name has remained "Akashi" to this day. (Incidentally, the head priest of Temple No. 47, Yasaka-ji, also bears the surname "Yasaka.")

== Temple Grounds ==
- Sanmon (Nio-mon Gate): Features Nio guardian statues (created during the Edo period; wooden construction with inlaid crystal eyes and antique coloring; heights: A-gyo [open-mouthed figure] 178 cm, Un-gyo [closed-mouthed figure] 178.5 cm).
- Main Hall (Hondo): Houses the principal image, a seated statue of the Thousand-armed Kannon (created in the late Heian period; plain wood finish with carved eyes; height: 82.0 cm). The side altars feature standing statues of Fudo Myoo and Bishamonten (both created during the Kamakura period; wooden construction with inlaid crystal eyes and polychrome coloring; heights: 100.1 cm and 99.5 cm, respectively), as well as statues of the Twenty-eight Legions (27 figures currently survive, including the Wind God and Thunder God; created during the Kamakura period; heights range from 57.8 cm to 69.9 cm). Every year on August 9th (from 10:00 AM to 8:00 PM), the principal image—the Thousand-armed Kannon—is unveiled for public viewing, allowing visitors to worship the various Buddhist images within the hall; a Goma fire ritual is also held starting at 6:00 PM. The ceiling of the outer sanctuary (gejin) is adorned with ema (votive plaques) dedicated by parishioners, serving as decorative ceiling paintings. Additionally, the roof is covered with durable, reddish-brown Sekishu tiles, known for their excellent resistance to cold weather.
- Daishido (Founder's Hall): Houses a statue of Kobo Daishi (created in Shotoku 2 [1712] by the Kyoto sculptor Akao Ukyo; height: 44.5 cm). The zushi (altar cabinet) is occasionally left open, allowing visitors—if they are lucky—to view the statue. Historical records regarding the initial construction of the Daishido at this temple are somewhat ambiguous; while a copy of a 1636 ridge-beam inscription (Maikodo Munefuda no Utsushi) suggests a construction date in the late 16th century, and other theories point to 1636, the year 1712 remains the only date for which there is definitive evidence.
- Shoro (Bell Tower)
- Jizodo (Jizo Hall): Visitors may view a standing statue of Enmei Jizo Bosatsu (the Life-Extending Jizo; created during the Edo period; height: 162.8 cm; wooden construction with inlaid crystal eyes and gold-leafed lacquer finish).
- Kobo-ido (Kobo's Well)
- Meoto-sugi (Husband-and-Wife Cedar Trees)
- "Shiawase Kannon" (Happiness Kannon) Stone Statue and Large Gorinto (Five-Ring Pagoda): The stone statue was erected in 1960. The tower is a memorial stupa dedicated to "Ike no Zenni"—the woman credited with saving the life of Minamoto no Yoritomo—and stands 155.3 cm tall.
- Uwa Saigoku 33 Kannon Pilgrimage: The statues are arranged in a U-shape, extending from the rear of the Guest Hall toward the "Happiness Kannon" statue.
- Tsubogaya New Shikoku (Local 88-Temple Pilgrimage): See details below.
- Poetry and Haiku Monuments: There are three such monuments: ① Located to the rear-right of the Happiness Kannon; ② Located within the hill to the right, approximately 20 meters in front of monument ①; ③ Located within the hill to the left of the access road leading to the temple, bearing the inscription: "For the pilgrim, a southern breeze—yesterday and today."

Ascending the stone steps from the approach path, one finds the *Honbō* (Head Priest's Quarters) and *Nōkyōjo (Pilgrim's Office) on the right, and a Temizuya (purification pavilion) on the left, before passing through the main temple gate (Sanmon). To the right stands the Jizō Hall; ascending a few more steps—for a total of 79 steps—leads directly to the Main Hall (Hondō) situated at the front of the complex. To the right of the Main Hall are the Bell Tower and the Daishi Hall. Turning left just before the main temple gate leads to the restrooms, and further beyond them lies the Kōbō Well. Additionally, passing in front of the Honbō and venturing into the hills behind the temple leads to the Uwa Saigoku 33 Kannon Pilgrimage route, at the very end of which stands the Happiness Kannon statue.

- Shukubō (Temple Lodging): Capacity of 30 guests (reserved exclusively for groups).
- Parking: Space for 20 vehicles. Parking is free for standard-sized cars and smaller vehicles; 1,000 yen for large buses; and 500 yen for microbuses.
- Events: "Meisekiji Shugen: Great Saitō Goma Fire Ritual" — Held on February 3rd (Setsubun). A Goma fire ritual is performed by Shugen ascetics in the open space situated between the foot of the Main Hall's stone steps and the Jizō Hall, followed by a fire-walking ceremony for the participating devotees.
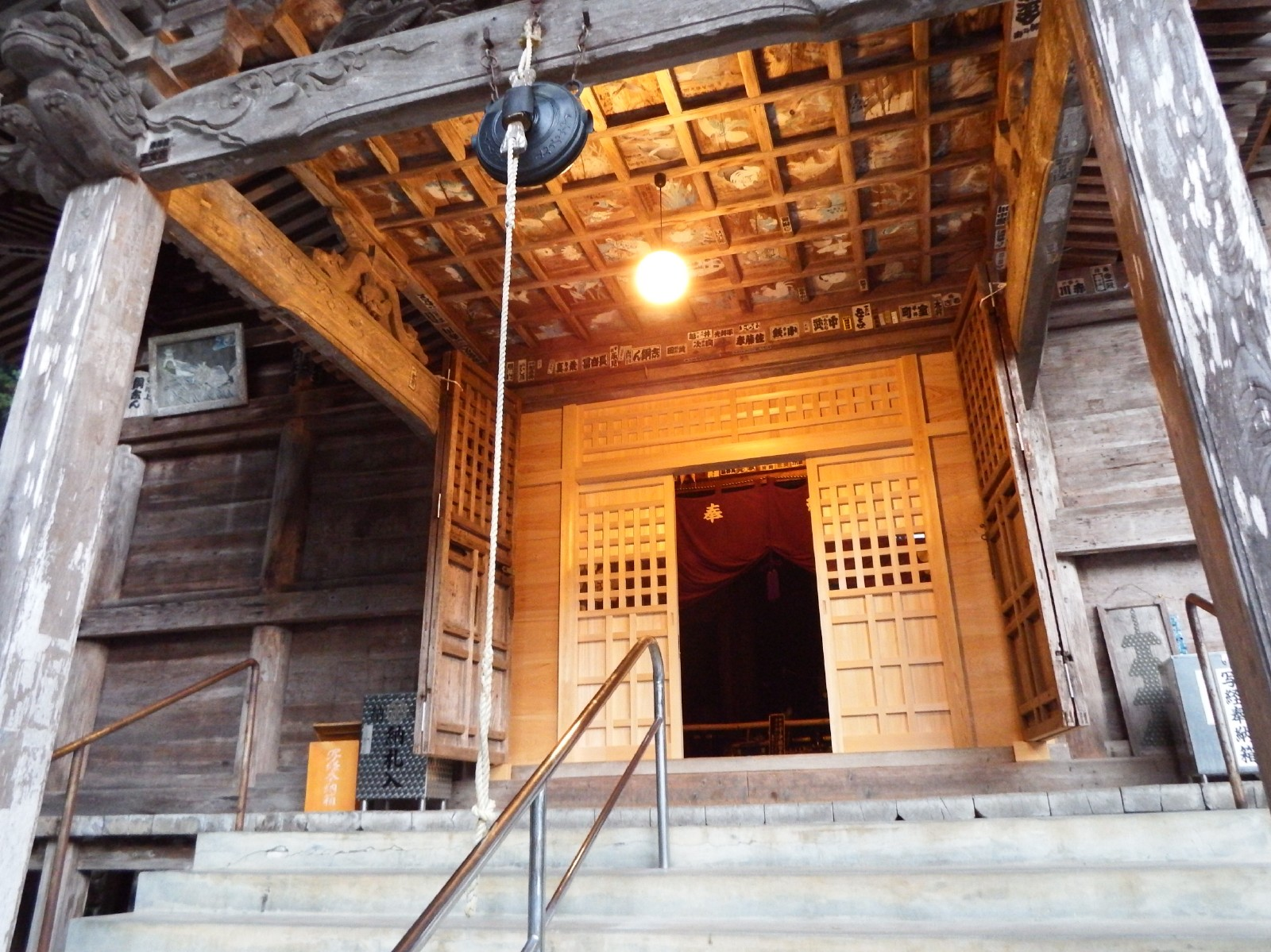
Ceiling painting in the Main Hall

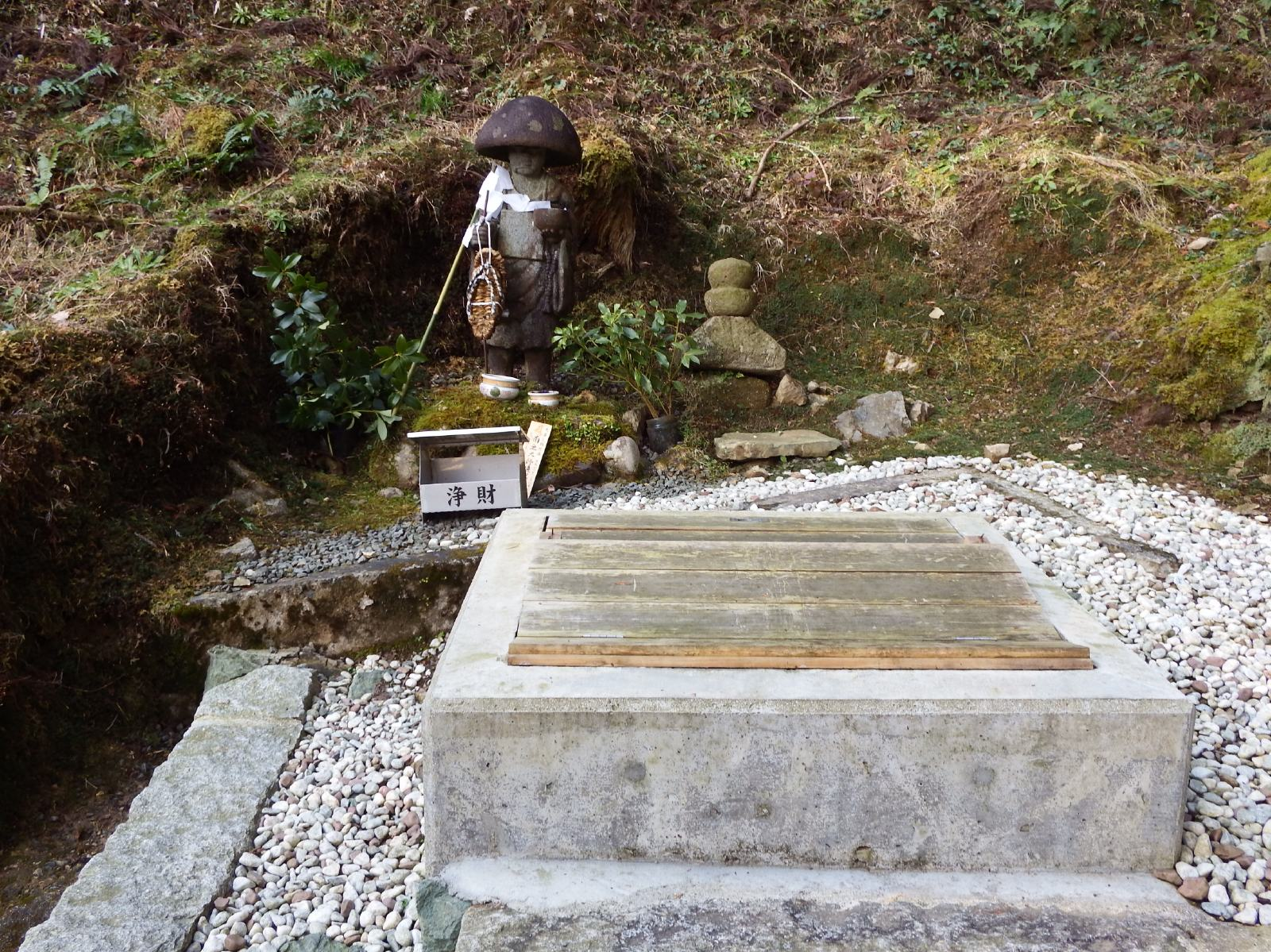
The Kōbō Well

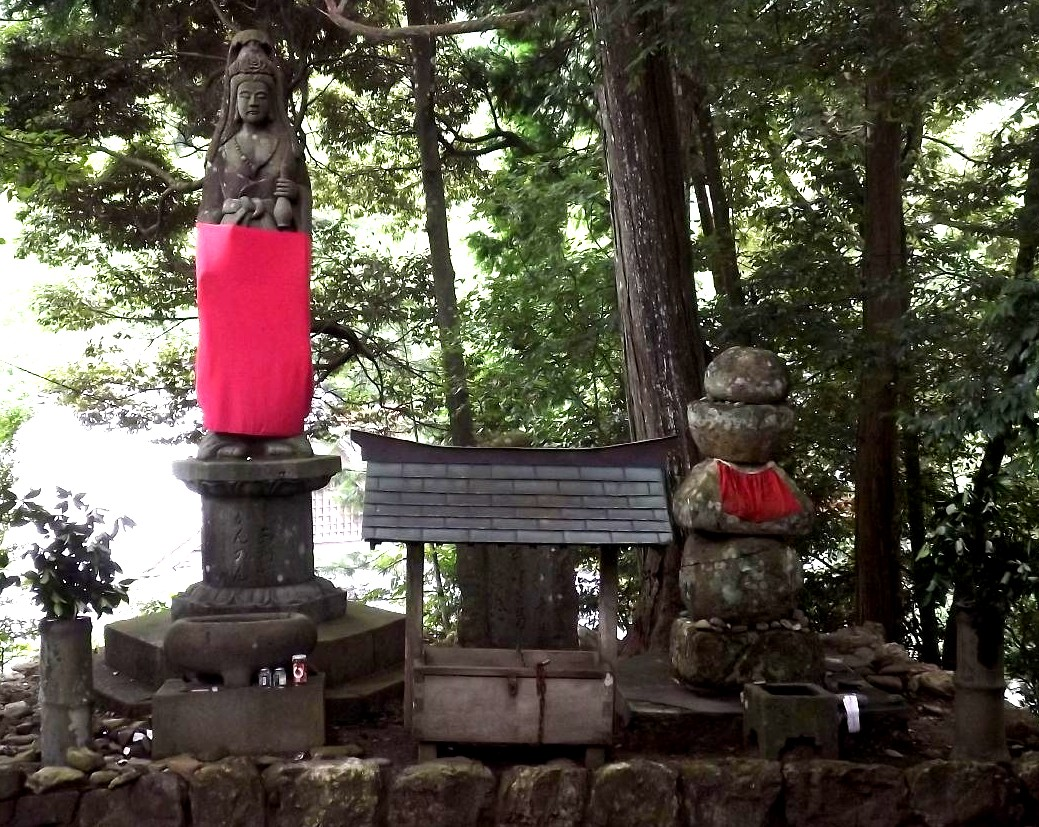
The Happiness Kannon and a large *Gorintō* (Five-Ring Stupa)

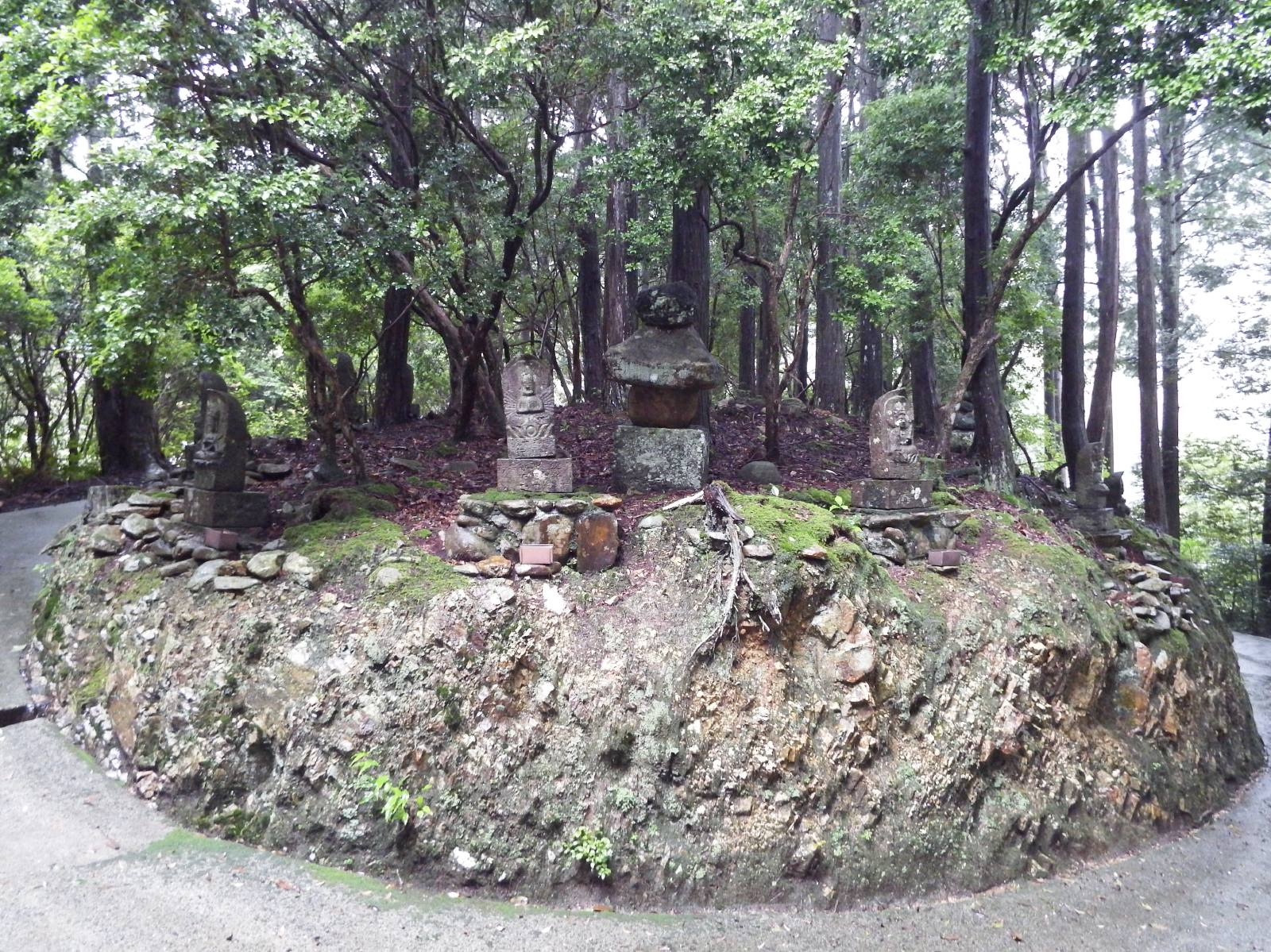
The Uwa Saigoku 33 Kannon Pilgrimage statues

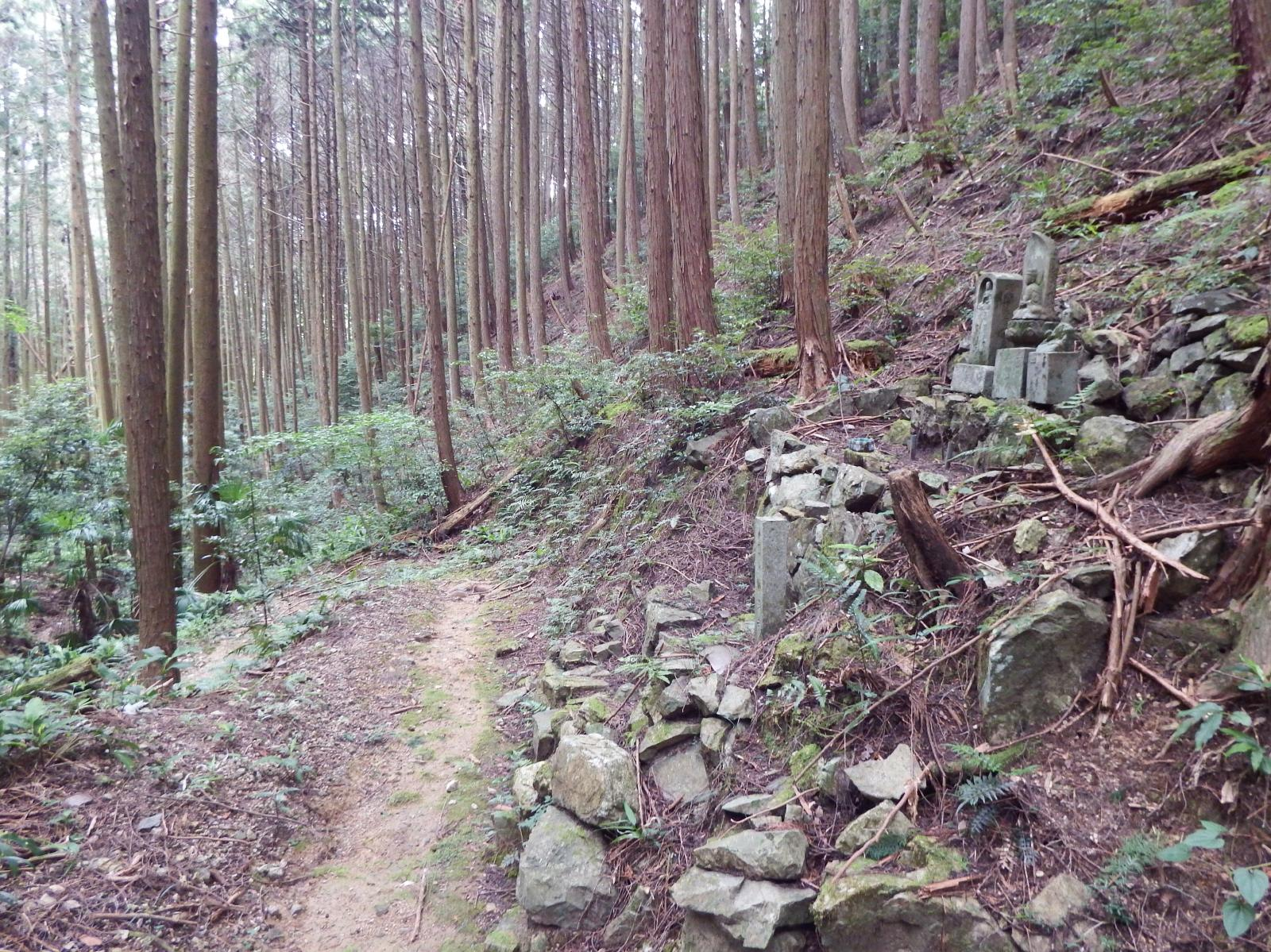
The Tsubogaya New Shikoku pilgrimage route

== Cultural Properties ==
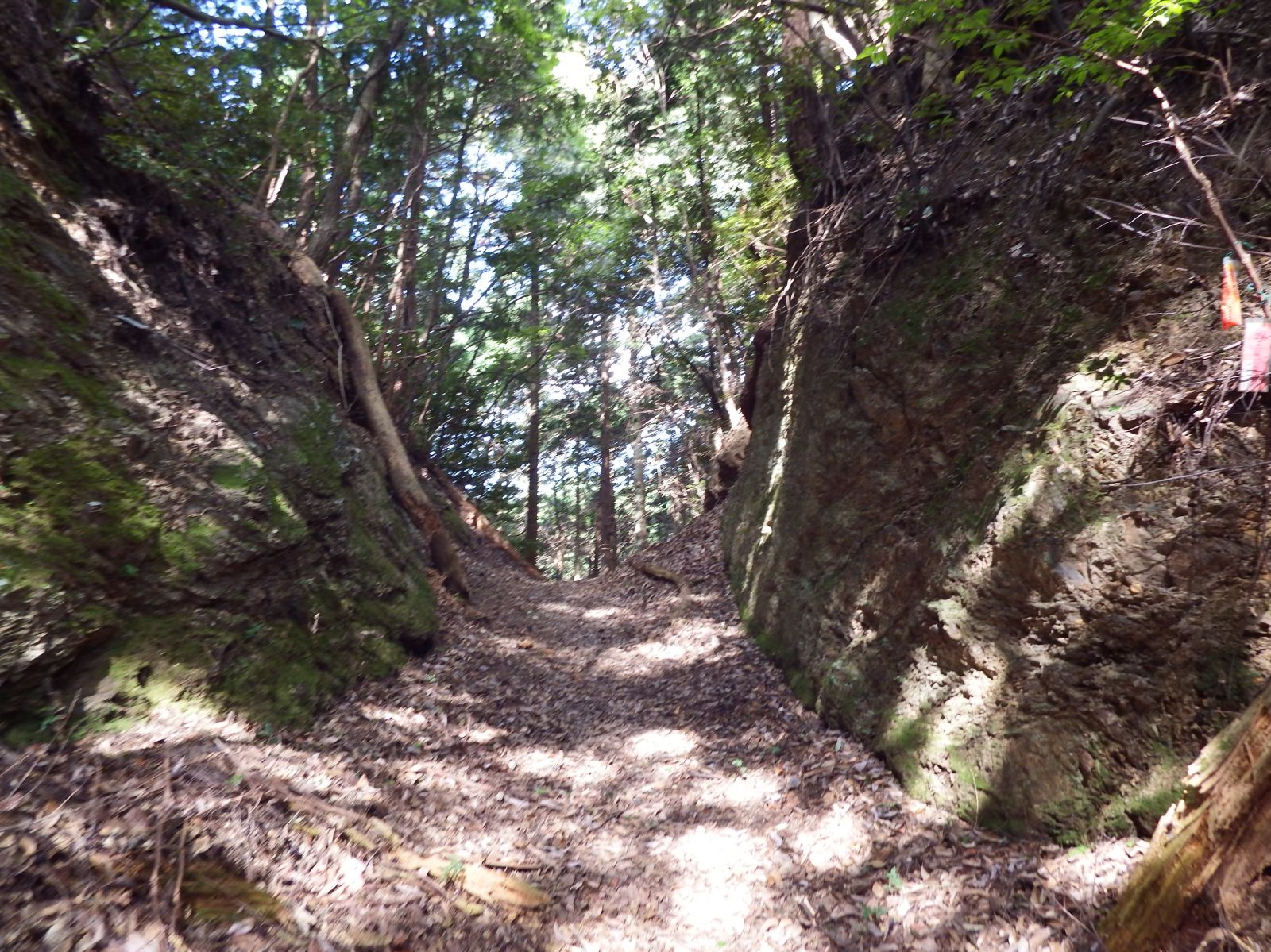
Daiboji Road (Mountain Pass Cut Section)

=== National Historic Sites ===
- Iyo Pilgrimage Route: Akishidera Temple Precinct — 28.36591 ha. Designated on October 16, 2019.
- Iyo Pilgrimage Route: Taihoji Temple Road — Of the 67.3 km route extending from this temple to Taihoji Temple, the sections located within Seiyo City and Ozu City are listed below. For sections located in Kuma Kogen Town, please refer to Taihoji Temple: Cultural Properties.
  - A 755-meter section extending from this temple, crossing a mountain pass, and reaching the Uwa Cultural Village (specifically, the area situated further up the road leading to the Special Needs School). Designated on October 16, 2019
  - An approximately 3,769-meter section extending from the site of the Ozu-Torisaka Checkpoint in Seiyo City, crossing the Torisaka Pass, and reaching Nosaku-Fudakake in Ozu City. Designated on February 21, 2024

=== Nationally Registered Tangible Cultural Properties ===
- Nio-mon Gate: Built circa 1901 (Meiji 34); the following nine items were registered in October 2007.
- Main Hall: Built circa 1890 (Meiji 23)
- Daishi-do Hall: Built in 1880 (Meiji 13)
- Jizo-do Hall: Built in 1909 (Meiji 42)
- Bell Tower: Built during the late Edo period
- Guest Hall: Built during the Taisho period; renovated circa 1967 (Showa 42)
- Chōzuya (Purification Pavilion): Built in 1937 (Showa 12)
- Stone Steps and Stone Wall (in front of Nio-mon Gate): Constructed in 1916 (Taisho 5) and during the Taisho period; expanded in the early Showa period
- Stone Steps and Wall (in front of Main Hall): Constructed in 1930 (Showa 5) and 1944 (Showa 19)
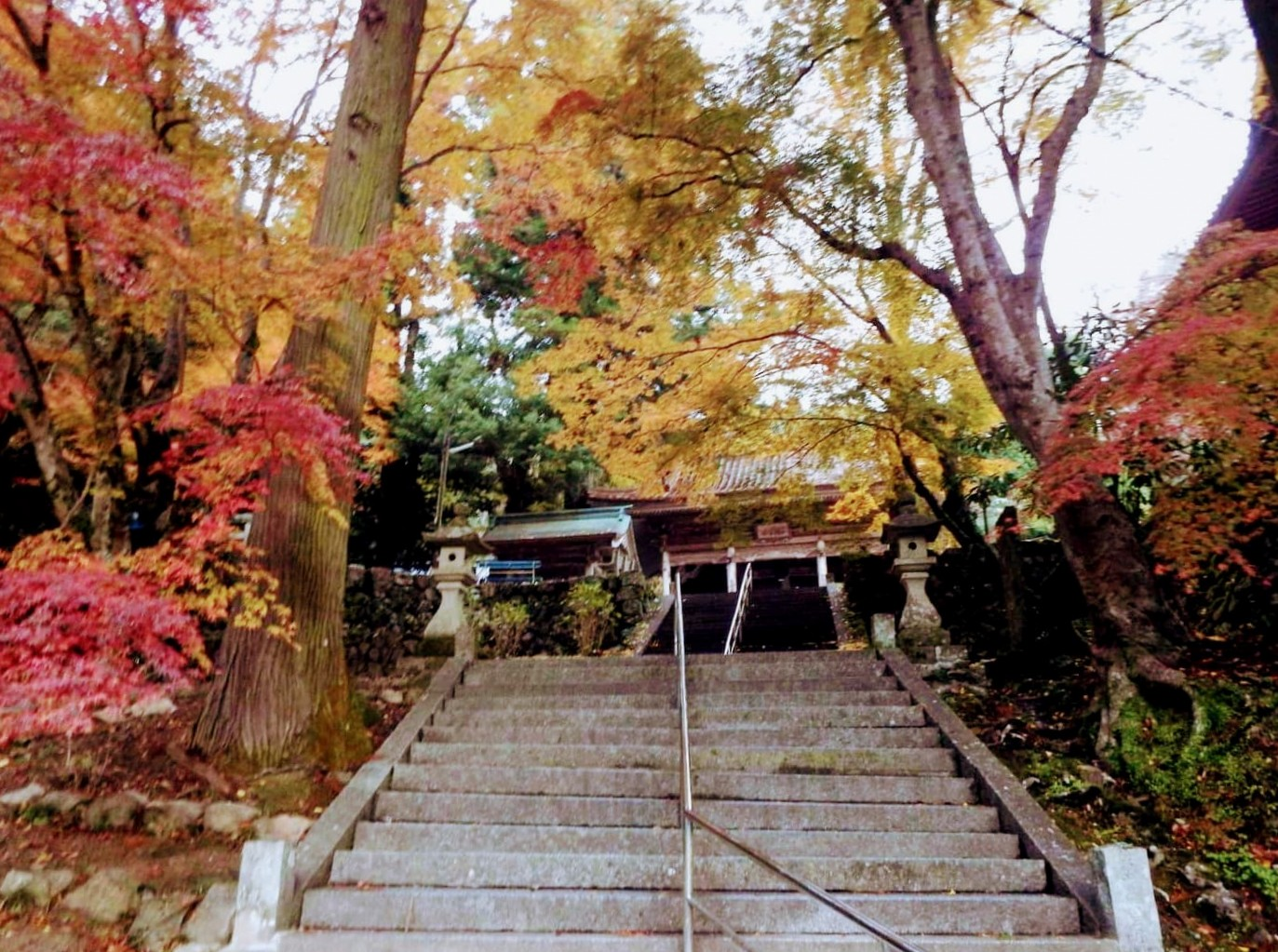
Stone steps and stone walls in front of the Niō Gate

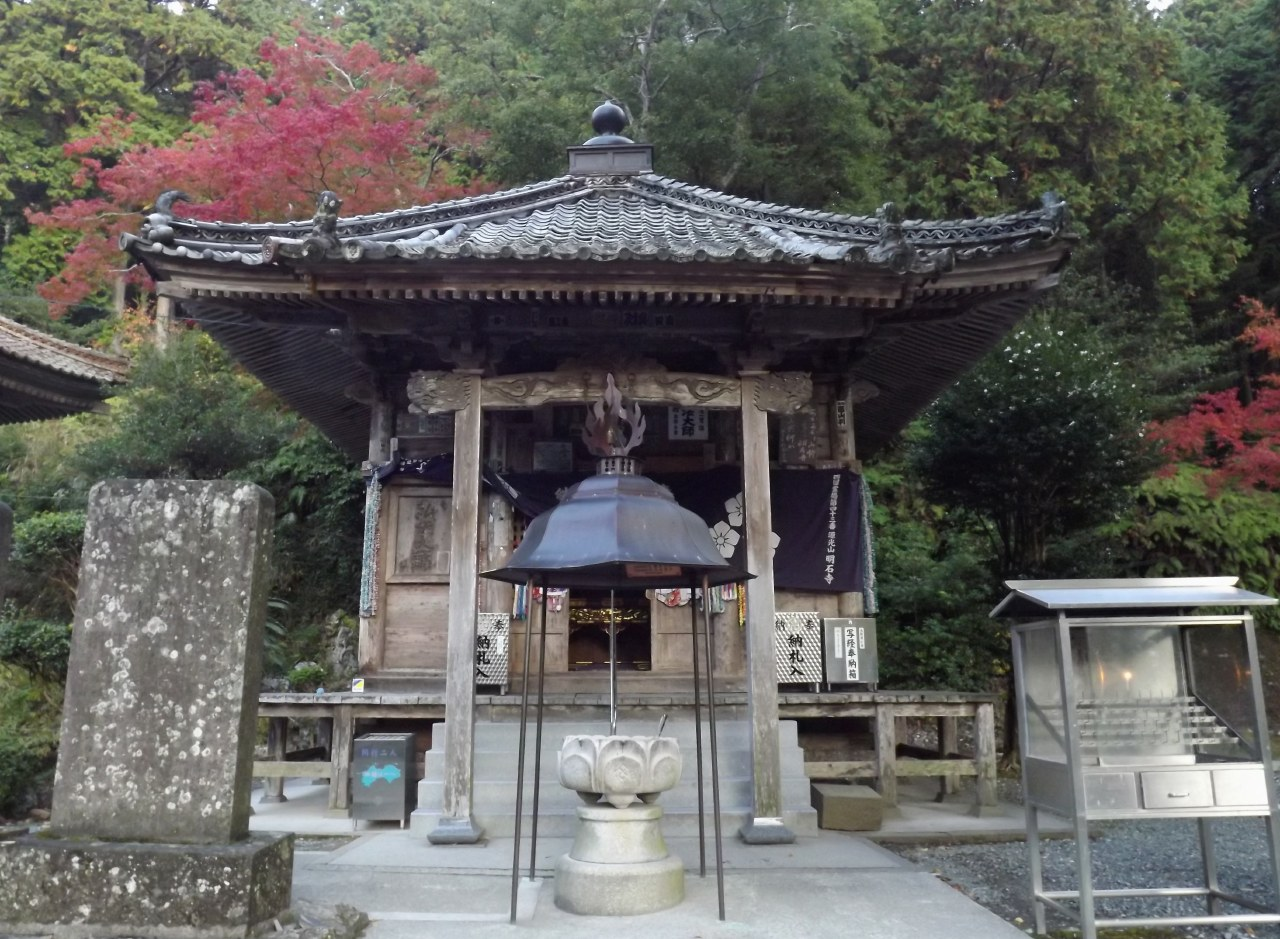
Daishi Hall

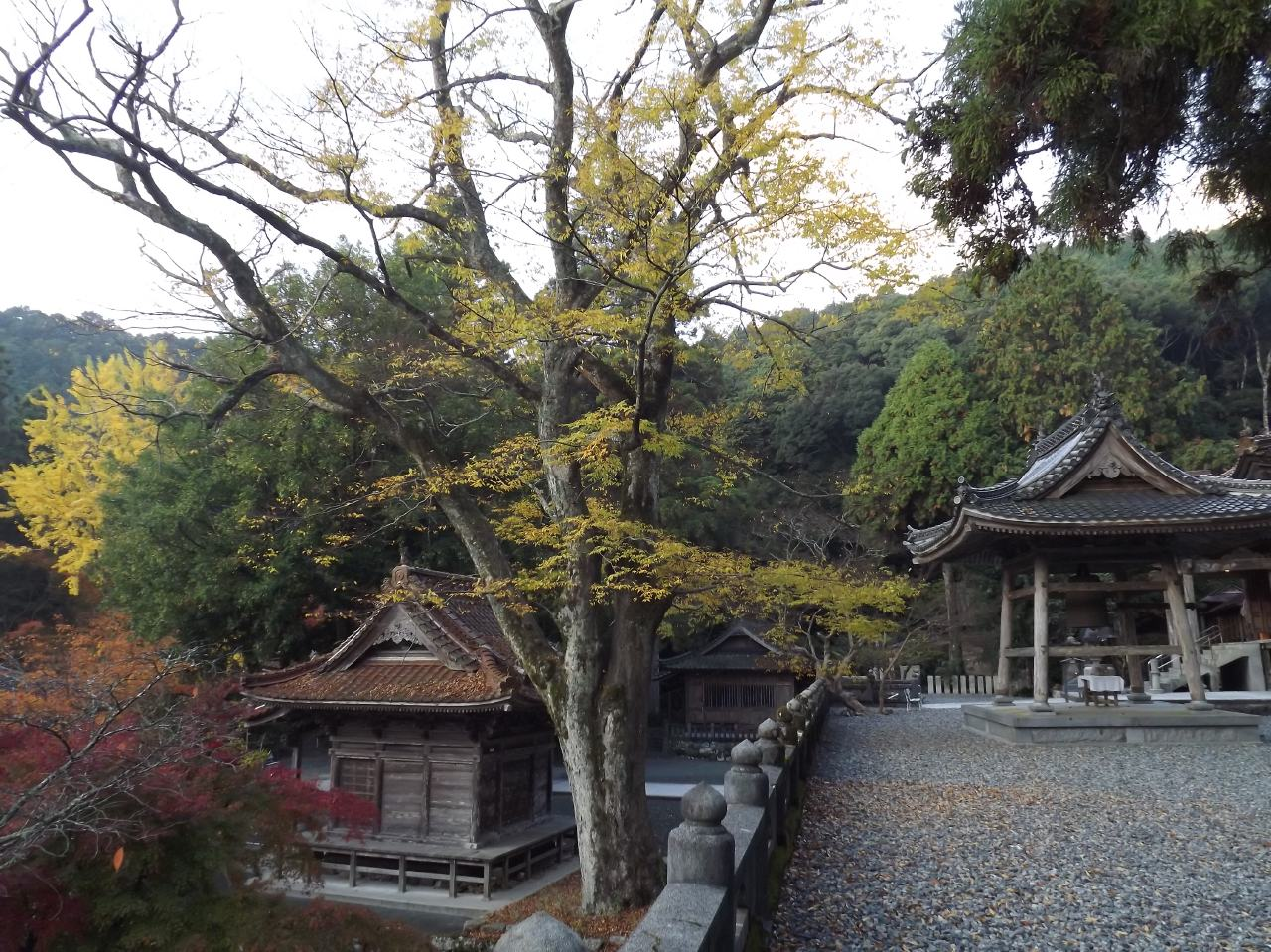
Jizō Hall and Bell Tower

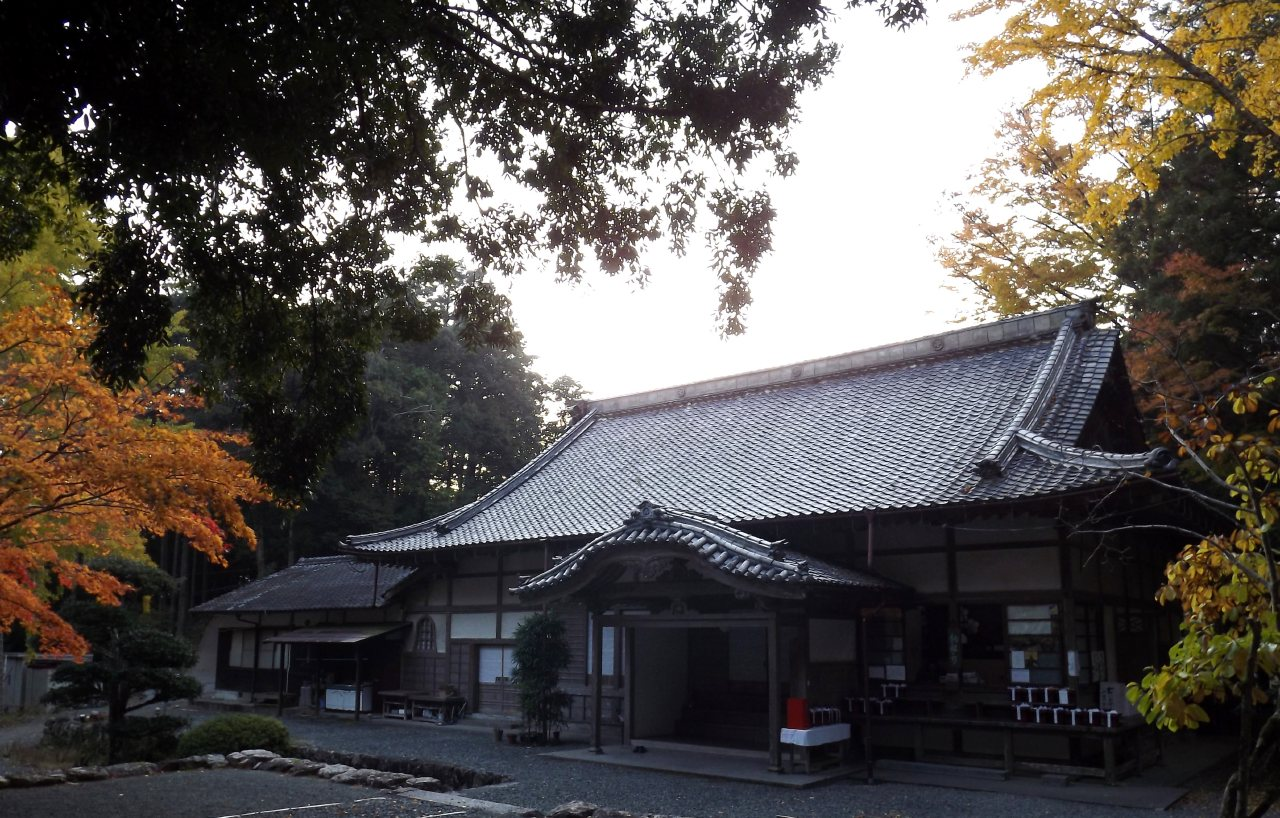
Guest Hall

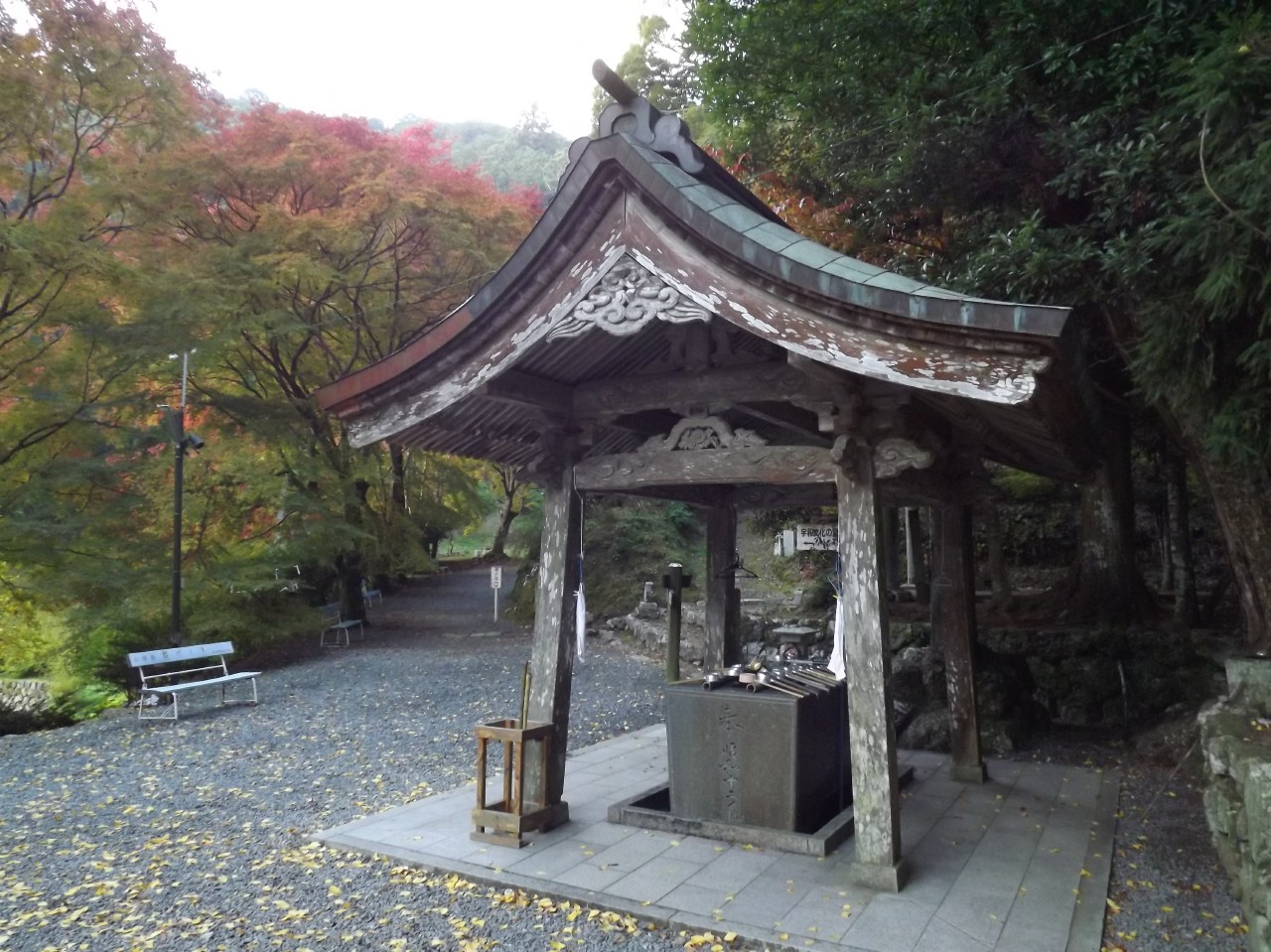
Chōzuya (Purification Pavilion)

=== Ehime Prefectural Designated Tangible Cultural Property ===
- Kumano Mandala (Painted on Silk): One hanging scroll; dimensions: 98.5 cm (height) x 38.5 cm (width). Created during the Muromachi period. Designated on April 2, 1965.

=== Hometown Cultural Property Forest ===
- Hiwada (Cypress Bark) — Seiyo City, Akashi-ji Temple Cypress Forest: Designated by the Agency for Cultural Affairs on March 24, 2014 (Designation No. 58). Area: 3.93 hectares.

=== Undesignated Cultural Properties ===
- Seated Statue of En no Gyōja: Created in 1784. Statue height: 61.0 cm. Constructed from a single block of wood; wooden construction with inlaid crystal eyes and polychrome finish.
- Standing Statue of Zōchōten (Attributed) / Standing Statue of Jikokuten (Attributed): Created during the mid-Heian period. Wooden construction with carved eyes; unpainted finish.
- Portrait of the Great Master Tendai (Painted on Silk): Created during the Muromachi period. Dimensions: 94.8 cm x 36.0 cm.

== Kumano Shrine ==
The shrine is situated adjacent to the temple, running parallel to it. The Twelve Shrines of Gongen are aligned in a row alongside the temple's Main Hall. The principal deities enshrined here are Izanagi-no-Mikoto and Izanami-no-Mikoto. In the sixth year of the Tenpyō era (734), the ascetic Jugen—a fifth-generation descendant of En no Ozunu—invited the Twelve Shrines of Gongen from Kumano in Kishū province to serve as the temple's guardian deities; they were subsequently enshrined and worshipped as the Kumano Twelve Shrines of Gongen.

Although originally an integral part of the temple complex, the shrine became an independent entity following the separation of Shinto and Buddhism during the Meiji era. Regarding the current structures, the three shrines on the western side date back to the mid-Edo period, while the nine shrines on the eastern side were constructed during the late Edo period; during the Showa era, their original thatched roofs were renovated and replaced with corrugated metal roofing. The shrine is currently under the administration of the Akashi district.

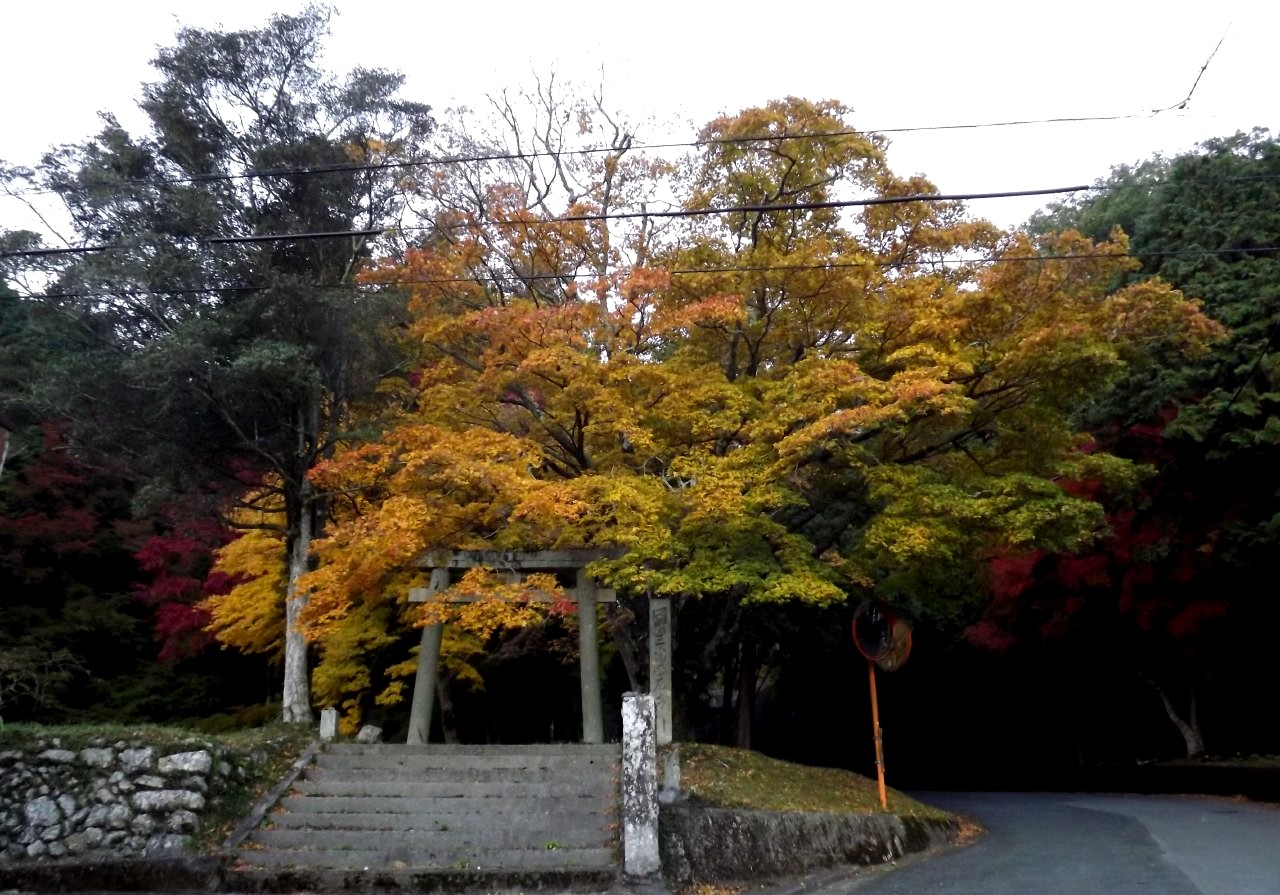
Near the entrance (the First Torii Gate)

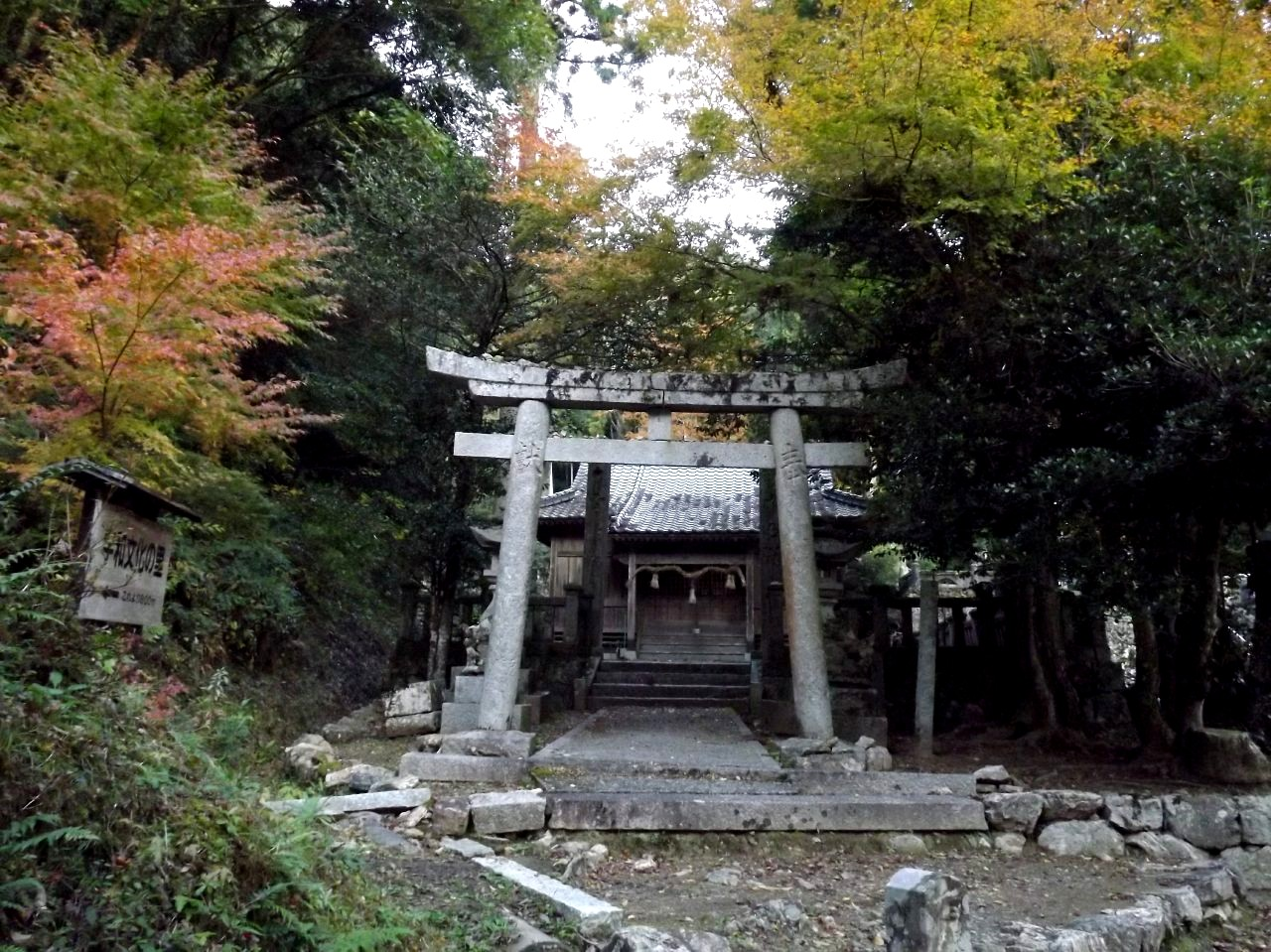
The Second Torii Gate, with the Shimen-ishi (Sacred Stone) and Haiden (Worship Hall) visible beyond

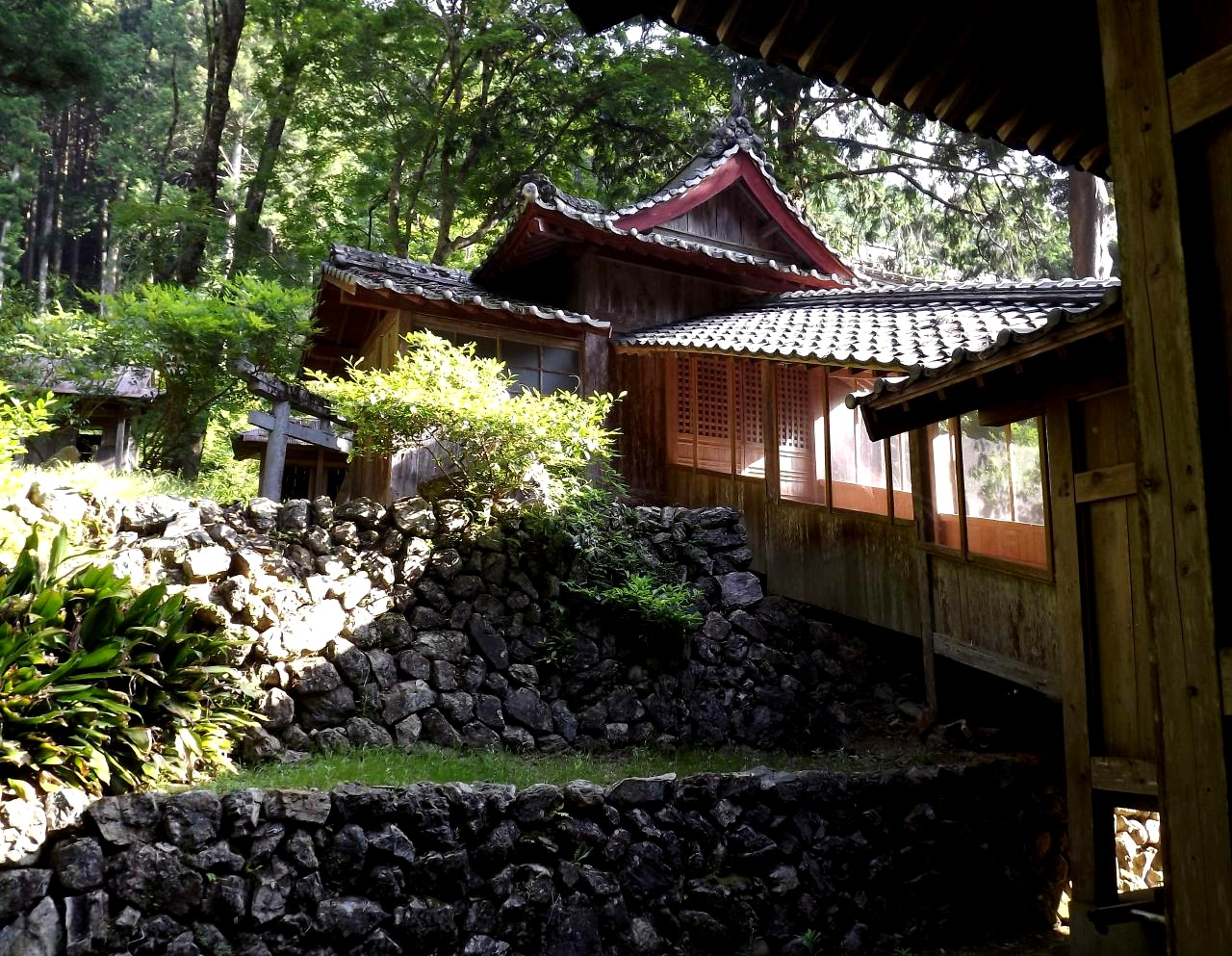
Waiting Room, Covered Stairway Corridor, and Noritoden (Prayer Hall)

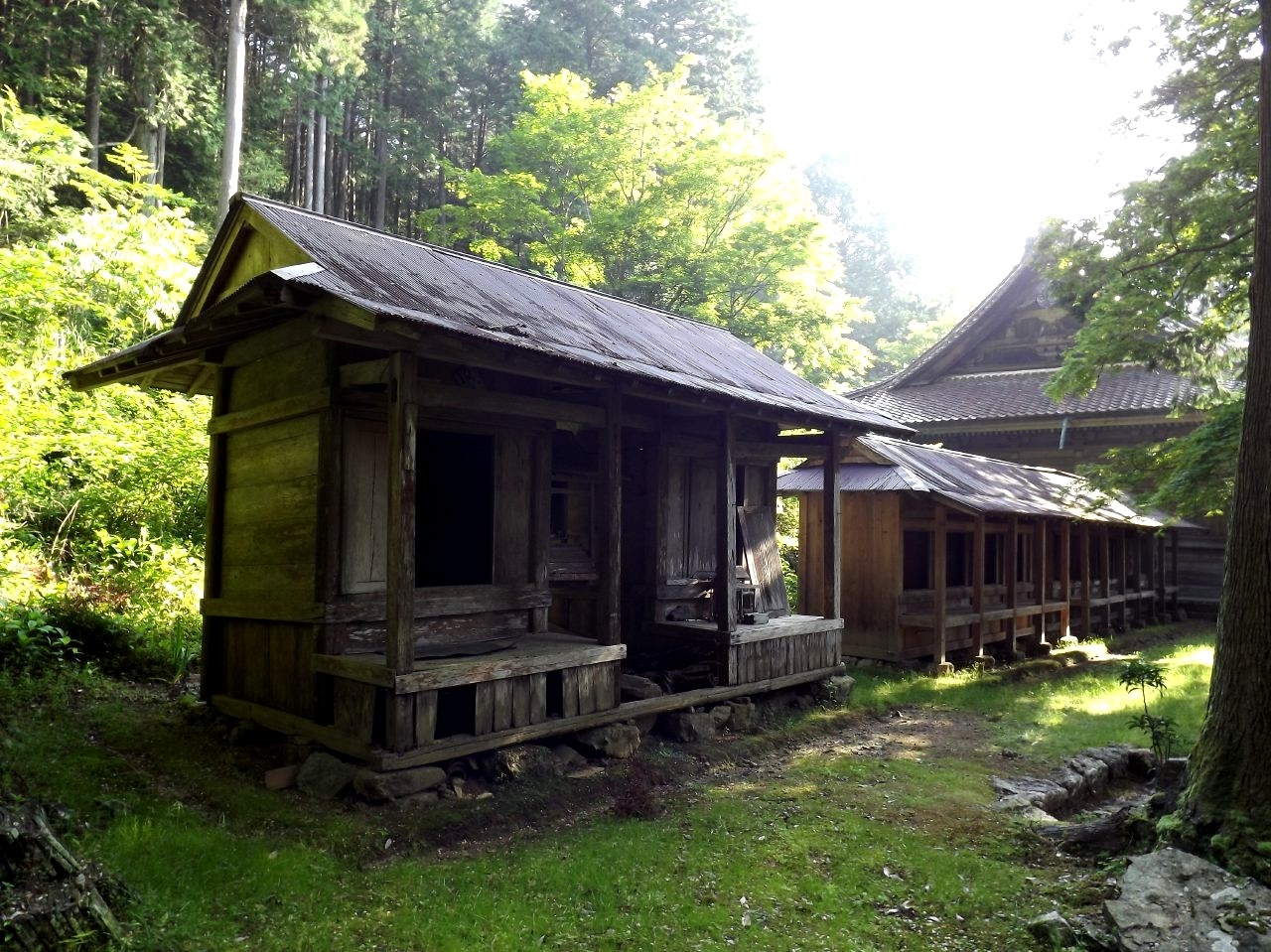
Junisha Gongen (Twelve Shrine Deities)

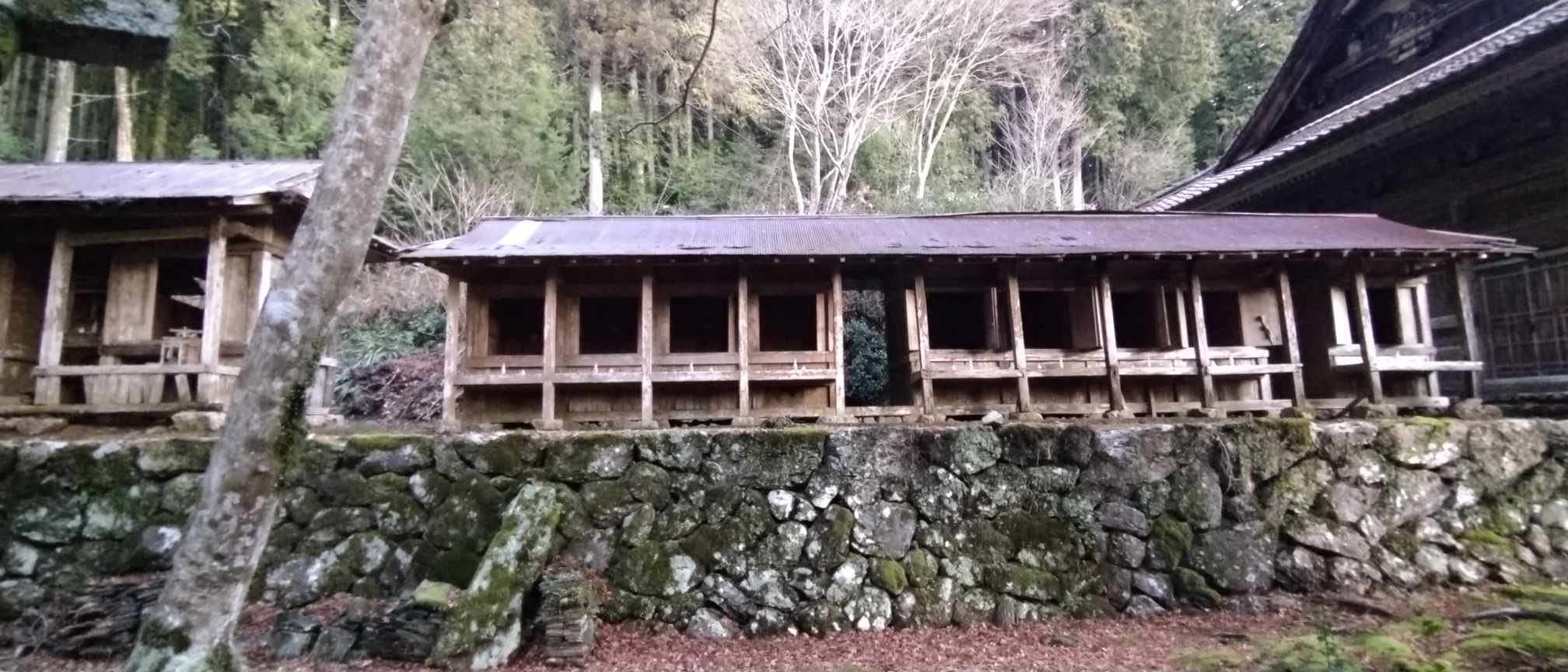
Junisha Gongen (Twelve Shrine Deities)

== Inner Sanctuary ==
Hakunō Gongen

=== Shirao Gongen ===
Located approximately 300 meters to the west—along the mountain slope—from a *torii* gate situated on the left side of the path, about 200 meters before the temple’s main gate. The *Uwa Kyūki* (Old Records of Uwa), compiled in 1681, recounts the following legend: "Long ago, a young woman of eighteen or nineteen years of age was walking along this path while bearing a large stone upon her head. When dawn broke, she set the stone down and left it there. As that specific location came to be known as 'Shirao,' the stone was subsequently enshrined and venerated as Shirao Gongen; the woman herself was believed to have been an embodiment of the divine power of Kannon Bodhisattva." The *Yusho no Oboe* (Memorandum on Origins), compiled in 1870, states that when Kōbō Daishi designated this temple as an official pilgrimage site, he drew a massive bedrock slab up from the sea and enshrined Shirao Gongen there. This "Shirao faith" is regarded as a localized adaptation of the Hakusan faith that evolved specifically within the Nanyo region of Ehime Prefecture; while numerous Hakusan Shrines can be found in the Toyo and Chuyo regions, Shirao Shrines are unique to Nanyo. It is believed that this faith spread throughout the region around the 15th century, coinciding with the flourishing of the Kumano faith in Nanyo.

- Location: Akashi, Uwa-cho, Seiyo City, Ehime Prefecture（33°21′59.34″N 132°31′21.73″E）

== Nearby Unofficial Sacred Sites ==
=== Dōin Daishi ===
Although it has been enshrined since ancient times, its precise origins remain unclear. It is believed to possess miraculous powers; those who offer a prayer here are said to receive guidance and assistance.

- Location: Shimokawa, Uwa-chō, Seiyo-shi, Ehime Prefecture (33°20′34.17″N 132°33′1.36″E)

=== Fudakake-zan (Buddakake-zan) Fudakake Daishi-dō ===
While the *Miyazaki Book* lists the temple under the name "Buddakake-zan," signage at the actual site identifies it as "Shingon-shu Omuro-ha: Fudakake-zan Buddakake-ji" and "Koyasu Kōbō Daishi." Legend has it that when the Great Master (Kōbō Daishi) stopped here to rest, he hung a votive tablet bearing the image of Shakyamuni Buddha upon a pine tree. The site is currently uninhabited and has fallen into disrepair, with the temple building now in a state of collapse.

- Location: Nosaku, Ōzu-shi, Ehime Prefecture (33°28′2.03″N 132°32′43.45″E)

=== Kōbō Daishi's Open-Air Lodging: Toyoga-bashi Bridge ===
It is said that while the Great Master was on a pilgrimage circuit throughout Shikoku, night fell upon him at this location as he made his way toward Sugō-zan (Taihō-ji Temple). Finding no private homes nearby where he might seek lodging, he spent the night beneath this very bridge. In commemoration of this historical event, pilgrims are still permitted to sleep beneath the bridge today—a practice regarded as an act of "ascetic training."

- Location: 180 Higashi-Ozu, Ozu City, Ehime Prefecture (33°31′54.3″N 132°34′31.5″E)

=== Sennin-yado Kinen Daishi-do (Hall Commemorating the "Inn for a Thousand People") ===
Rebuilt in 1930 (Showa 5), this hall serves as a *zengon-yado* (charitable lodging) for walking pilgrims. It enshrines a statue of the Great Master (Kobo Daishi), and pilgrims are still permitted to stay overnight within the hall today.

- Location: Uchiko-cho, Kita-gun, Ehime Prefecture (33°34′55.08″N 132°44′50.35″E)

=== Rakumizu Daishi-do ===
This hall was established to commemorate an occasion when the Great Master, weary from his pilgrimage, stopped to rest at this location; upon drinking the water here, he found it so delicious and refreshing that he rejoiced at the relief it brought him.
- Location: 3388 Ose-Higashi, Uchiko-cho, Kita-gun, Ehime Prefecture (33°35′12.3″N 132°45′3.21″E)

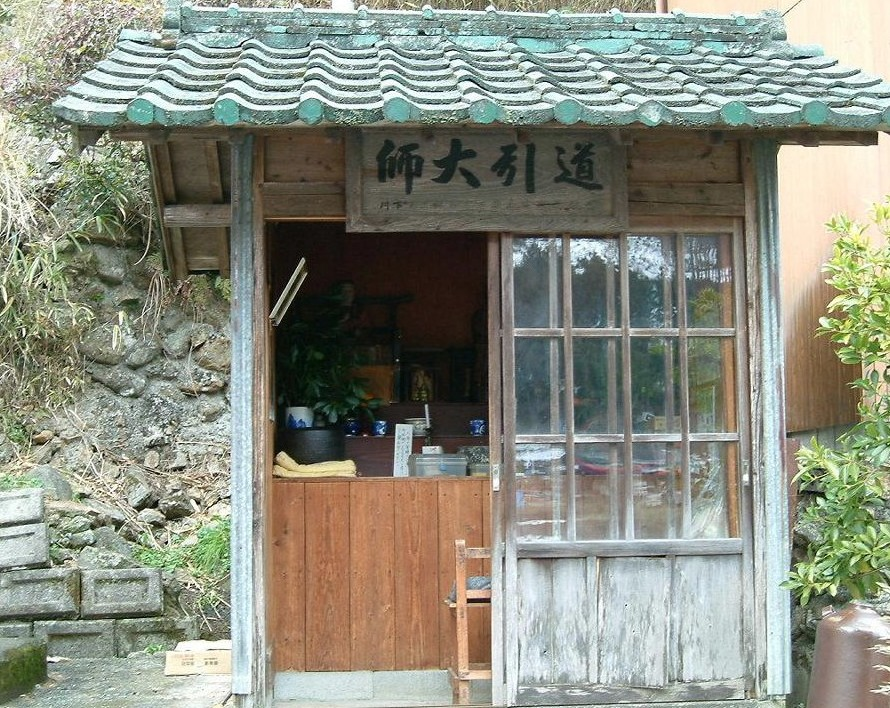
Douin Daishi-do

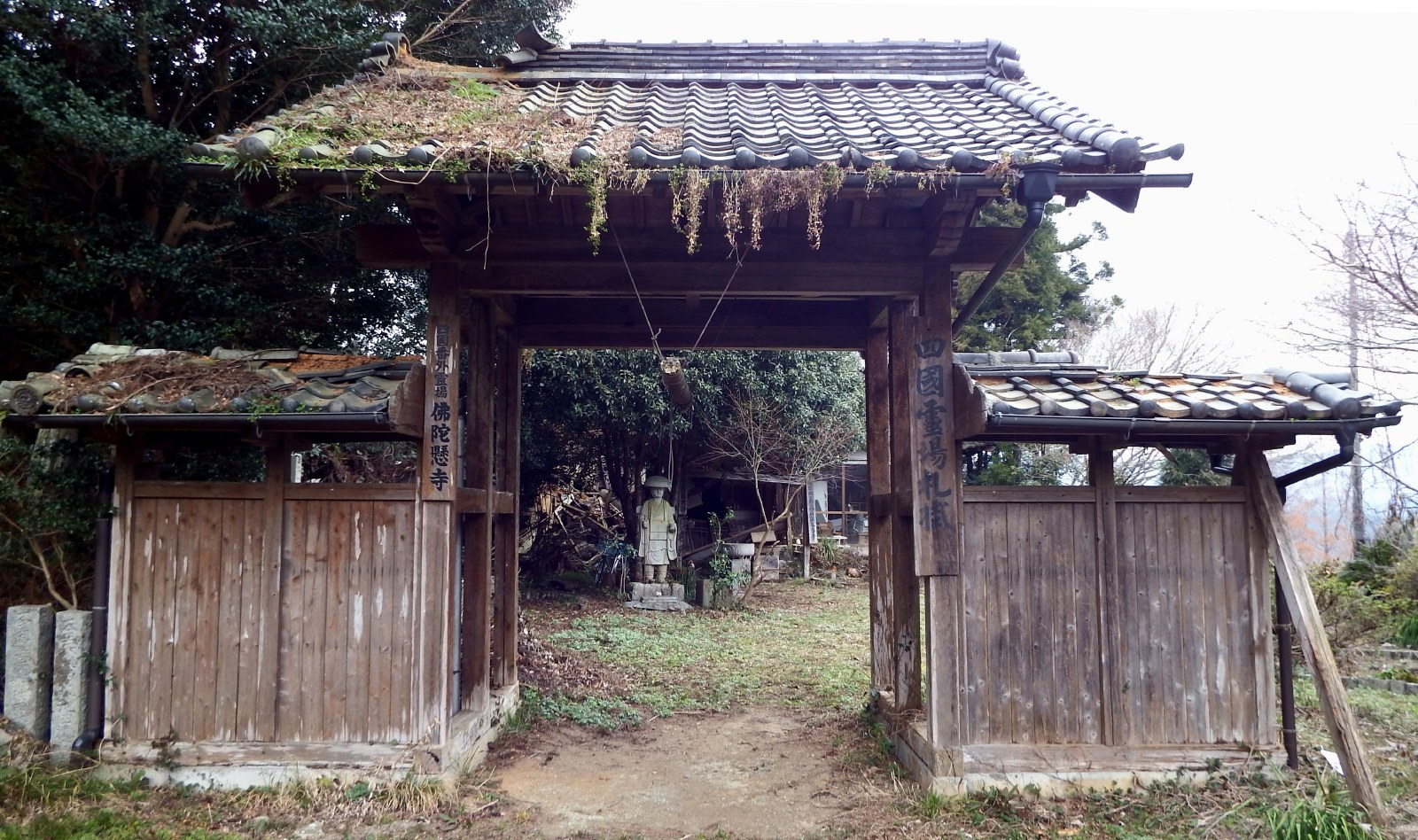
Fudakake Daishi-do

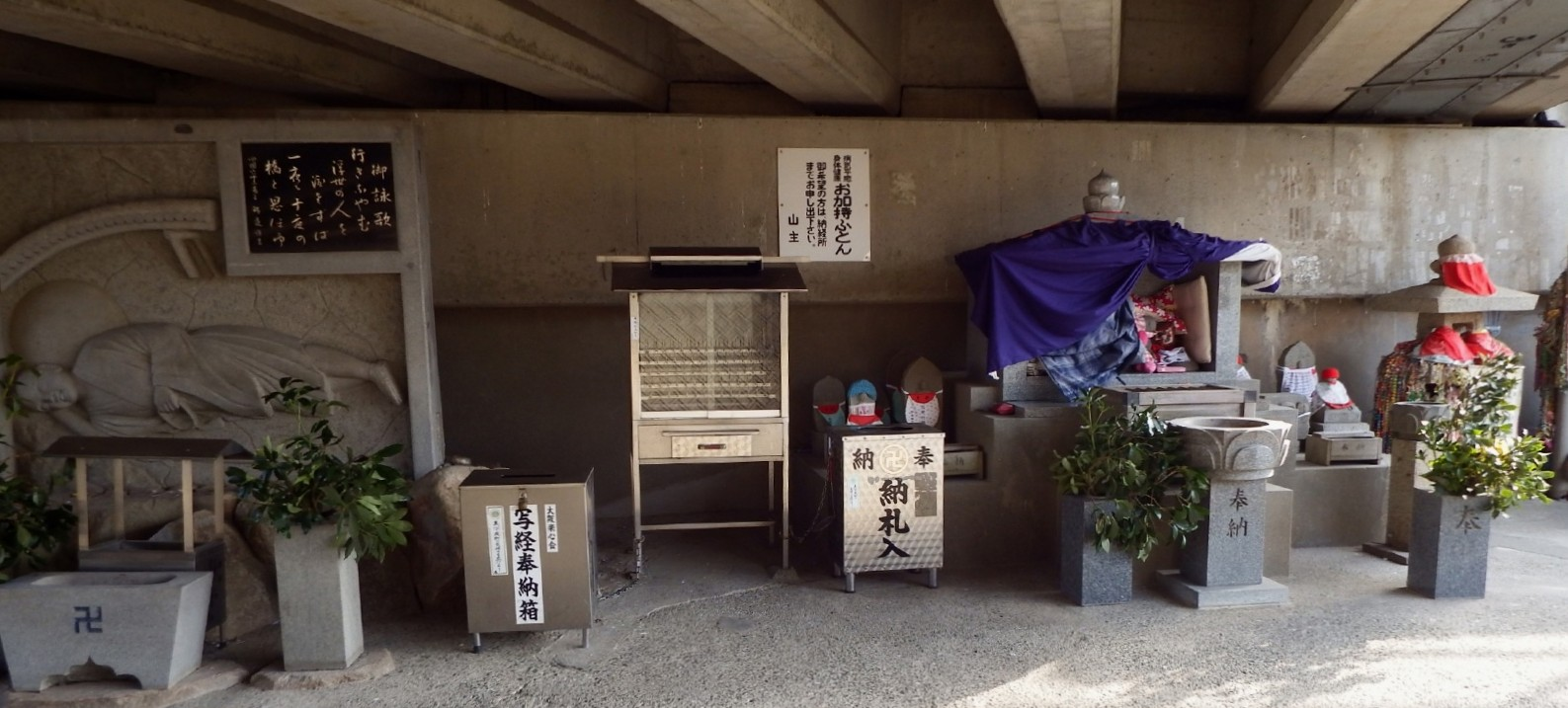
Beneath Toyogabashi Bridge

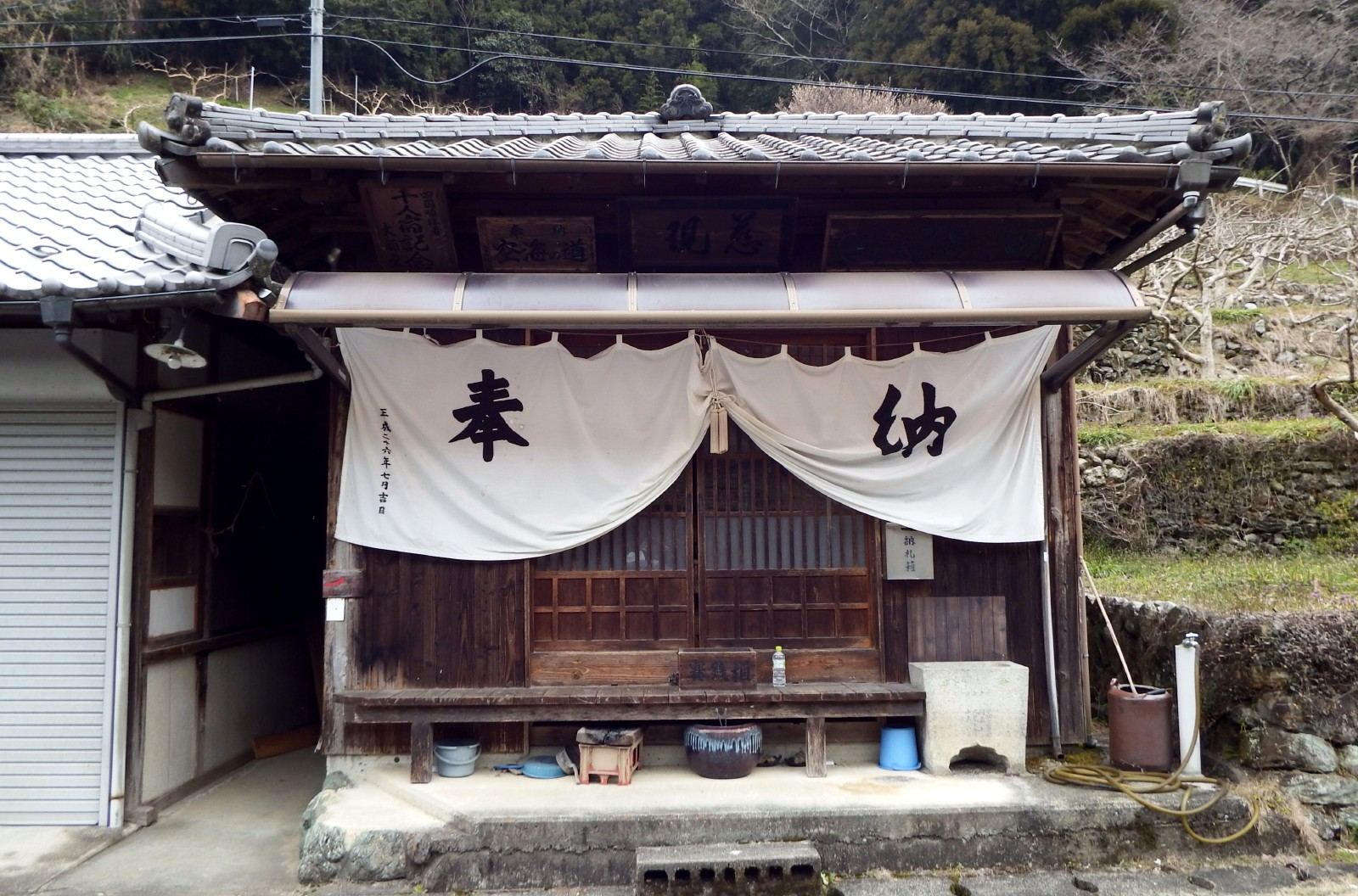
Sennin-yado Kinen Daishi-do

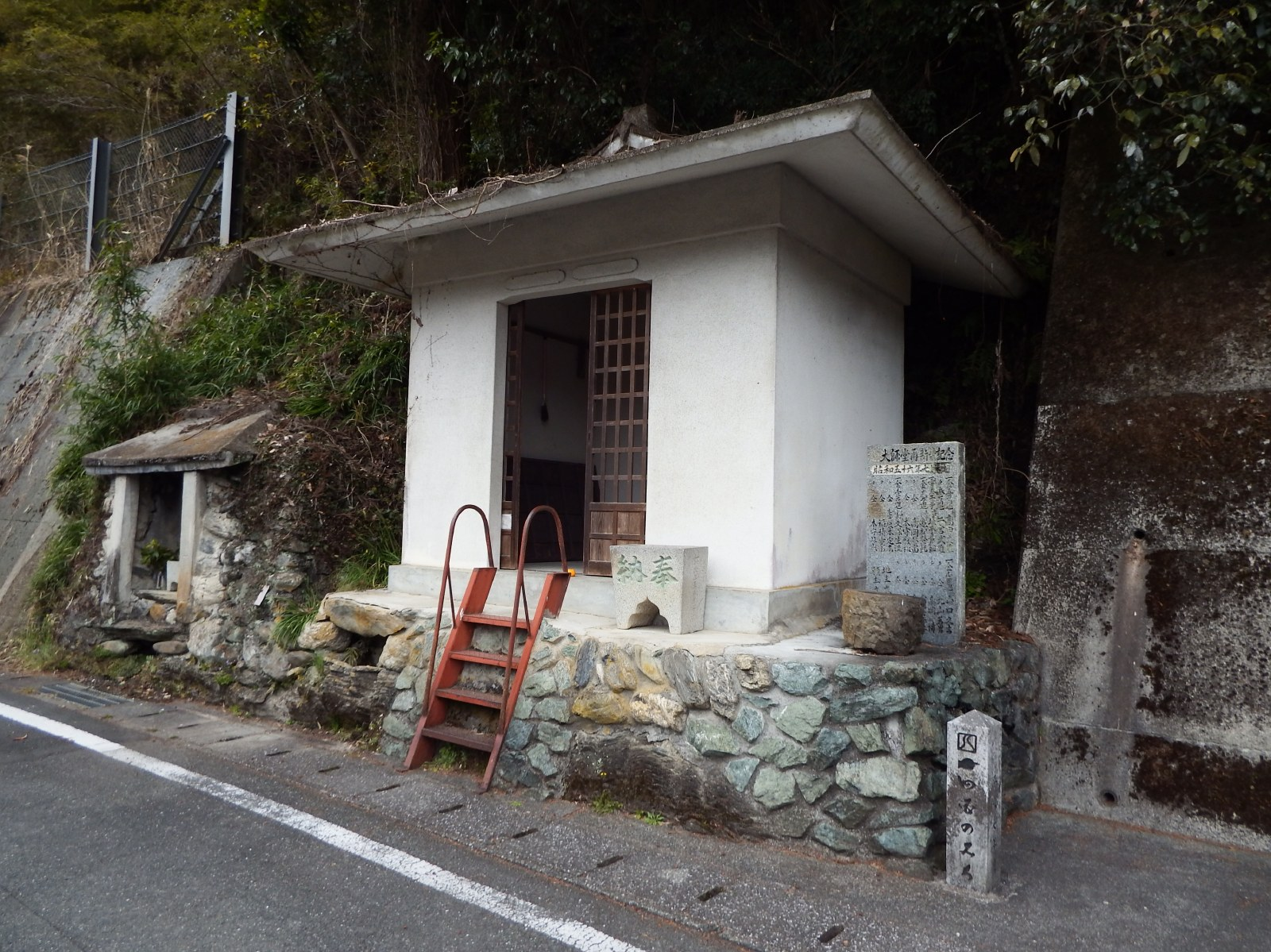
Rakumizu Daishi-do

== Neighboring Temples ==
=== Shikoku 88 temple pilgrimage ===
42 Butsumoku-ji – (10.6 km) – 43 Meiseki-ji – (67.2 km) – 44 Daihō-ji ※Note: There are multiple routes for the pilgrimage path; the distances listed above are based on the standard route.

== Surroundings ==
- Tsubobatani New Shikoku (Local Shikoku 88-Temple Pilgrimage): Established around 1833. The pilgrimage route spans the entire valley area to the west of the mountain pass leading to the "Uwa Cultural Village," accessible from this temple via the Taihoji Pilgrimage Road. Temple No. 1 is a small hall located within the precincts of Kokyo-ji Temple (requiring an ascent to the pass followed by a descent), while Temple No. 88 is a Daishi Hall situated in Ameyama Park (located immediately east of the Special Needs School).
- Kaiei-ji Temple: Founded by Kaigen on March 5, 1577 (Tensho 5), in Sunokawa Village, Uwa District. Until the early Meiji era, it was known as Kaieizan Kankaku-in (housing a stone-carved Eleven-faced Kannon as its principal image); subsequently renamed Tateishizan Kaiei-ji, it flourished as a site of worship for local fishermen—revered as the guardian deity of fishing—before eventually falling into decline. In November 2010, the temple was relocated to the precincts of Akashi-ji Temple (specifically, to the eastern slope of the parking lot area).
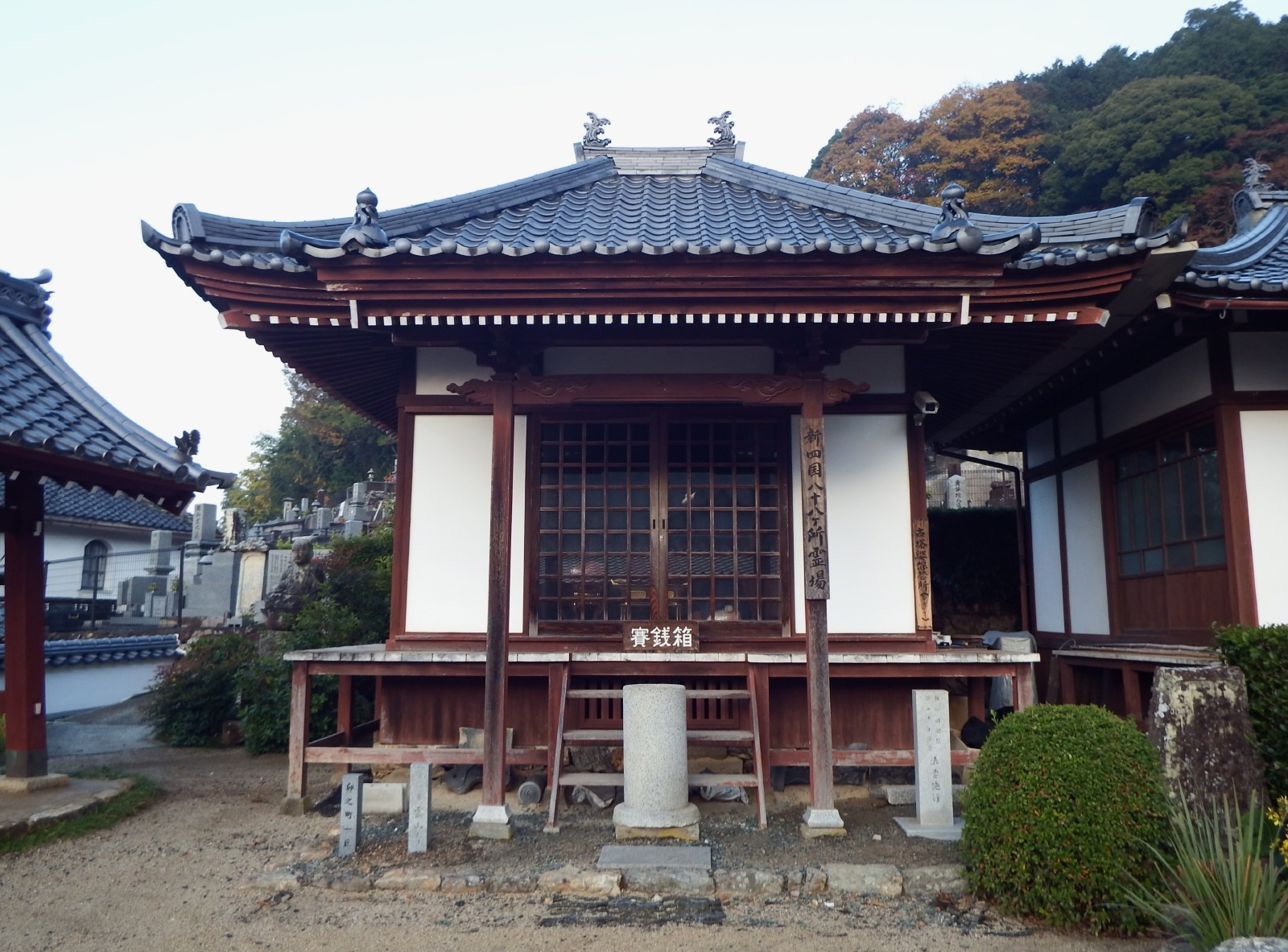
Tsubobatani New Shikoku: Temple No. 1

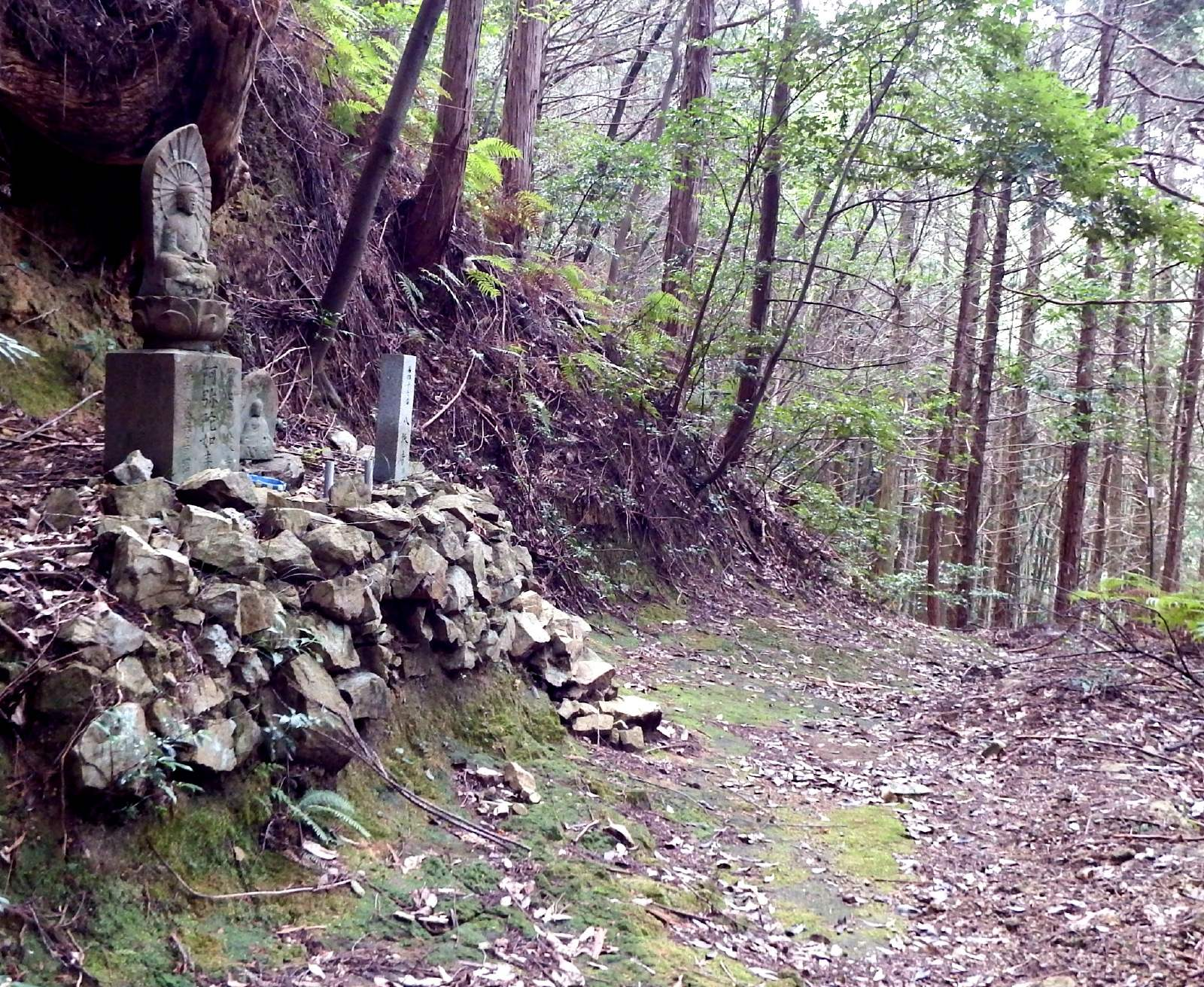
Tsubobatani New Shikoku: Temple No. 47

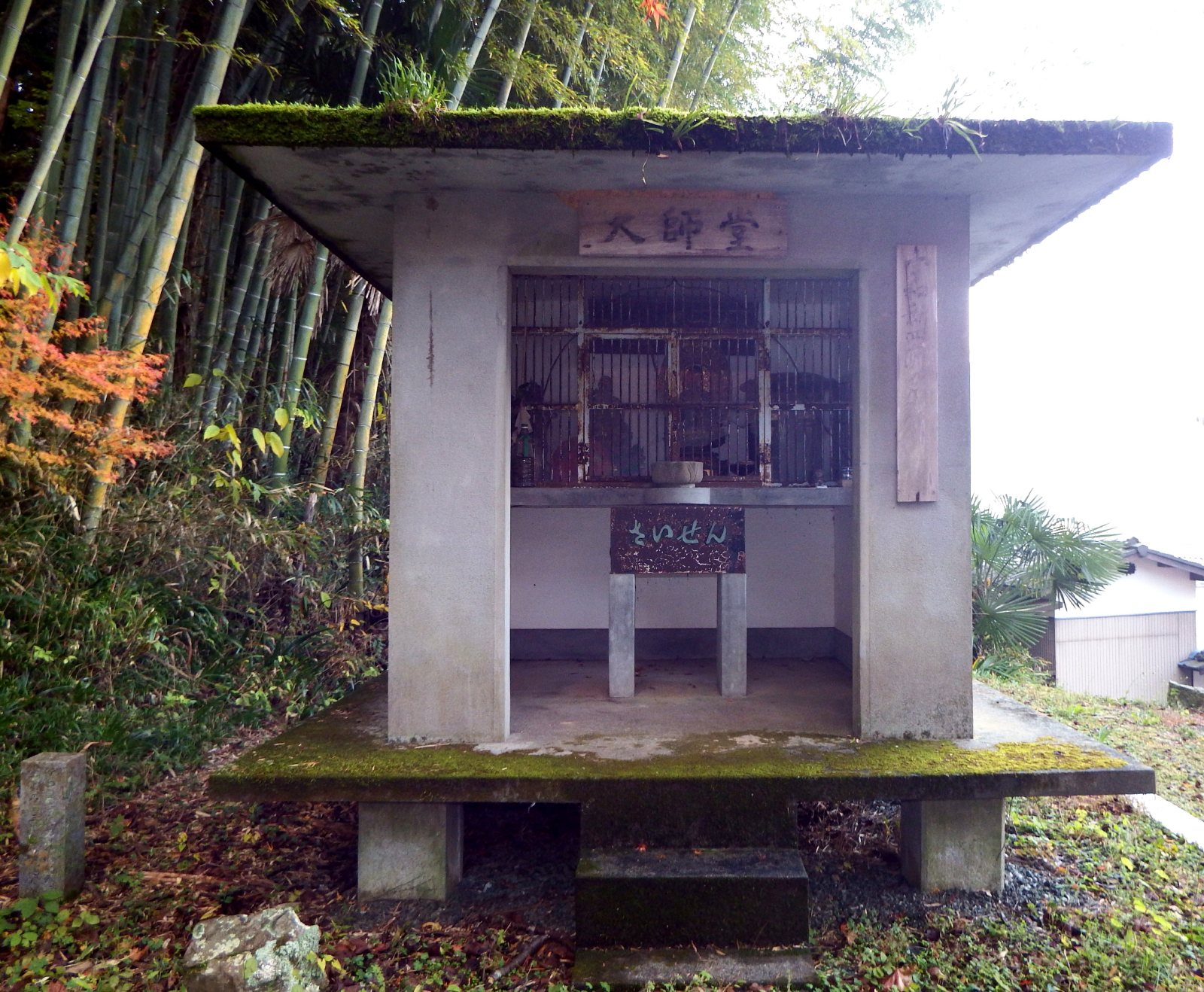
Tsubobatani New Shikoku: Temple No. 88

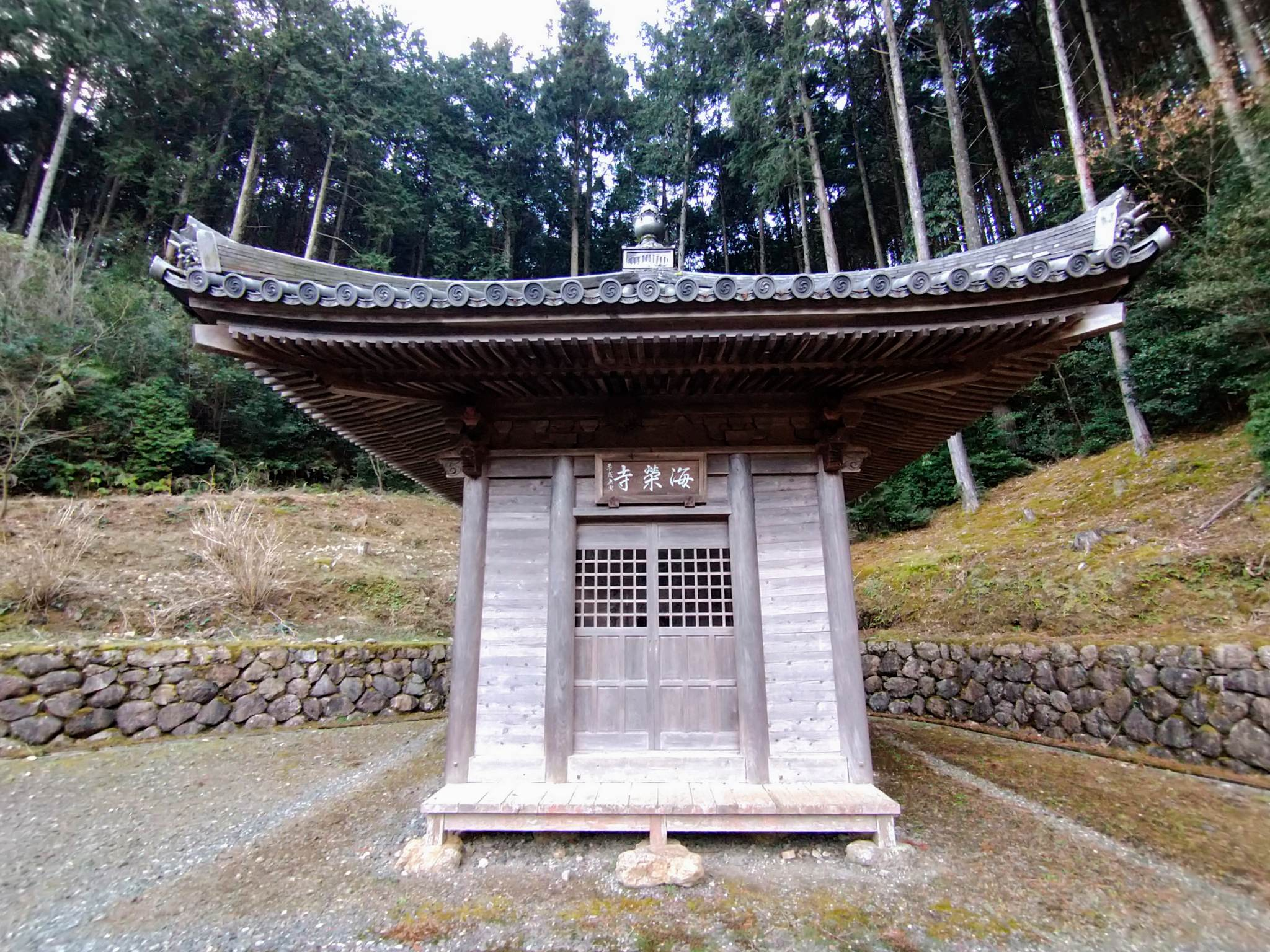
Kaiei-ji Temple: Main Hall
- Ehime Prefectural Museum of History and Culture: The Folklore Exhibition Room [3] features a dedicated section introducing the history and folklore of the Shikoku Pilgrimage.
- Uwa Cultural Village: Located in Unomachi, Uwa Town (designated as an Important Preservation District for Groups of Historic Buildings), this area encompasses sites such as the Kaimei School, the Suehiro Family Residence, and the Torii Gate.

== See also ==
- Shikoku 88 temple pilgrimage

== Bibliography ==
- Shikoku 88-temple Pilgrimage Association, ed. (2006). Pilgrim Guide's Canon. Shikoku 88-temple Pilgrimage Association.
- Tateki Miyazaki (2007). Shikoku Pilgrimage: Walking Alone, Accompanied by Two. Vol. Map Volume (8th ed.). Henromichi Preservation Cooperation Association.
- Tateki Miyazaki (2007). Shikoku Pilgrimage: Walking Alone, Accompanied by Two. Vol. Commentary Volume (7th ed.). Henromichi Preservation Cooperation Association.
