= Uwajima City Date Museum =

- 宇和島市立伊達博物館
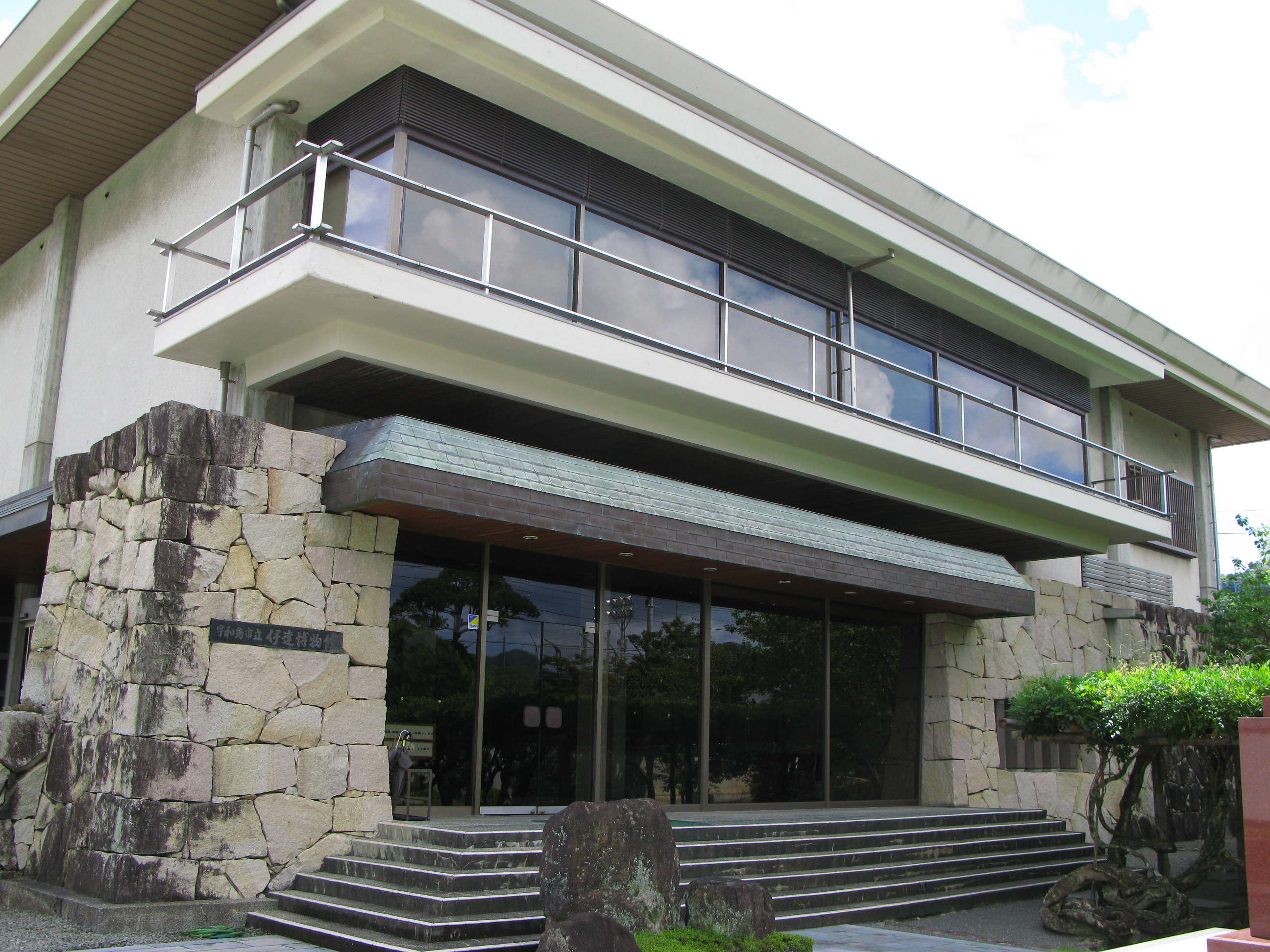

General information
- Location: 9-14 Gotenmachi, Uwajima, Ehime Prefecture, Japan
- Coordinates: 33°12′57″N 132°33′46″E
- Opened: 9 May 1974

Website
- Official website

The Uwajima City Date Museum (宇和島市立伊達博物館, Uwajima Shiritsu Date Hakubutsukan) opened in Uwajima, Ehime Prefecture, Japan in 1974. The collection focuses on the local branch of the Date clan, who from 1615 and the time of Date Hidemune were daimyō of the Uwajima Domain, and includes a Momoyama-period painting of Toyotomi Hideyoshi that has been designated an Important Cultural Property.

== See also ==
- Uwajima City Historical Museum
- List of Historic Sites of Japan (Ehime)
- List of Cultural Properties of Japan - paintings (Ehime)
- Uwajima Castle
