= Index of Japan-related articles (I) =

This page lists Japan-related articles with romanized titles beginning with the letter I. For names of people, please list by surname (i.e., "Tarō Yamada" should be listed under "Y", not "T"). Please also ignore particles (e.g. "a", "an", "the") when listing articles (i.e., "A City with No People" should be listed under "City").

== I ==
- I My Me! Strawberry Eggs!
- i-mode
- Indō Yoriyasu

== Ia ==
- Iaidō

== Ib ==
- Ibara, Okayama
- Ibaraki Prefecture
- Ibaraki, Osaka
- Ibi District, Gifu
- Ibigawa, Gifu
- Ibo District, Hyogo
- Ibogawa, Hyogo
- Ibuki, Shiga
- Iburi Subprefecture
- Ibusuki District, Kagoshima
- Ibusuki, Kagoshima

== Ic ==
- Ice Climbers
- Ichi the Killer (film)
- Ichi the Killer (manga)
- Ichiba, Tokushima
- Ichibata Yakushi Kyodan
- Ichihara, Chiba
- Ichijima, Hyogo
- Ichikawa, Chiba
- Ichikawa, Hyogo
- Kon Ichikawa
- Ichiki, Kagoshima
- Ichinomiya, Aichi
- Ichinomiya, Aichi (Mikawa)
- Ichinomiya, Chiba
- Ichinomiya, Hyogo (Shiso)
- Ichinomiya, Hyogo (Tsuna)
- Ichinomiya, Kumamoto
- Ichinomiya, Yamanashi
- Ichinoseki, Iwate
- Yuji Ichioka
- Ichishi District, Mie
- Ichishi, Mie
- Ichitaro
- Ichiu, Tokushima
- ICOCA

== Id ==
- Ide, Kyoto
- Ideogram

== Ie ==
- Ie (Japanese family system)
- Ie (trading houses)
- Ie, Okinawa
- Saburo Ienaga
- Ieshima, Hyogo

== If ==
- Akira Ifukube

== Ig ==
- Iga Province
- Iga, Mie
- Iggy Koopa

== Ih ==
- Ihara District, Shizuoka
- Ihara Saikaku
- Iheya, Okinawa

== Ii ==
- Ii Naosuke
- Iida, Nagano
- Iidabashi, Tokyo
- Iidabashi Station
- Ai Iijima
- Iinan District, Mie
- Iinan, Mie
- Iishi District, Shimane
- Iitaka, Mie
- Iiyama (company)
- Iiyama, Nagano
- Iizasa Ienao
- Iizuka, Fukuoka

== Ij ==
- Ijuin, Kagoshima

== Ik ==
- Ika District, Shiga
- Gendo Ikari
- Shinji Ikari
- Ikaruga
- Ikaruga, Nara
- Ikata, Ehime
- Ikawa, Tokushima
- Ikazaki, Ehime
- Ikebana
- Ikebukuro
- Ikebukuro Station
- Daisaku Ikeda
- Hayato Ikeda
- Riyoko Ikeda
- Ikeda, Gifu
- Ikeda, Kagawa
- Ikeda, Osaka
- Ikeda, Tokushima
- Ikeda school massacre
- Ikegami Honmon-ji
- Ikegami-Sone Site
- Ikegawa, Kochi
- Iki Province
- Iki, Nagasaki
- Ikina, Ehime
- Ikkyū
- Ikkyū-san (manga)
- Ikkyū-san (TV series)
- Ikoma
- Ikoma District, Nara
- Ikuno, Hyogo

== Im ==
- Imabari, Ehime
- Imafuji Chōtatsurō
- Imagawa Yoshimoto
- Yuka Imai
- Imaichi, Tochigi
- Shohei Imamura
- Imari, Saga
- Imazu, Shiga
- Imperial Court in Kyoto
- Imperial General Headquarters
- Imperial House of Japan
- Imperial Japanese Army
- Imperial embassies to China
- Imperial Japanese Navy
- Imperial Prize of the Japan Academy
- Imperial Rescript on Education
- Imperial University (now National Seven Universities)
- Imperialism in Asia
- Improvised Music from Japan

== In ==
- Ina, Nagano
- Inaba Province
- Inabe District, Mie
- Inabu, Aichi
- Hiroshi Inagaki
- Inagawa, Hyogo
- Inagi, Tokyo
- Inami, Hyogo
- Inami, Wakayama
- Inari (mythology)
- Inari Ōkami
- Inari shrine
- Inasa District, Shizuoka
- Inasa, Shizuoka
- Inatsuki, Fukuoka
- Inazawa, Aichi
- Indian National Army
- Ine, Kyoto
- Inez Fressage
- Ingen
- Initial D
- Ink and wash painting
- Ink brush
- Innai, Ōita
- Innoshima, Hiroshima
- Inō Tadataka
- Ino, Kōchi
- Inochi
- Inoue Enryō
- Kikuko Inoue
- Takehiko Inoue
- Yasushi Inoue
- Input method editor
- Insei
- Instant noodles
- Intelligent Systems
- International broadcasting in Japan
- International Kendo Federation
- International Military Tribunal for the Far East
- Interstella 5555: The 5tory of the 5ecret 5tar 5ystem
- Inukai Tsuyoshi
- Inukai, Ōita
- Inukami District, Shiga
- Inuyama, Aichi
- Inuyama Castle
- InuYasha
- InuYasha (character)
- Invasion of Astro-Monster
- Inzai, Chiba

== Ip ==
- Ippen
- Ippen Shōnin Eden
- Ipponmatsu, Ehime

== Ir ==
- Irabu, Okinawa
- Irem
- Irezumi
- Iriki, Kagoshima
- Iroha
- Iron Chef
- Irresponsible Captain Tylor
- Iruma, Saitama

== Is ==
- Isa District, Kagoshima
- Isahaya, Nagasaki
- Ise, Mie
- Ise Province
- Ise Shrine
- Isehara, Kanagawa
- Isen, Kagoshima
- Isesaki, Gunma
- Yusuke Iseya
- Ishibashi Ningetsu
- Tanzan Ishibashi
- Ishibe, Shiga
- Akira Ishida
- Ishida Mitsunari
- Ishigaki, Okinawa
- Kazuo Ishiguro
- Ishihara color test
- Shintaro Ishihara
- Ishii, Tokushima
- Sogo Ishii
- Ishikari, Hokkaidō
- Ishikari Subprefecture
- Ishikawa diagram
- Ishikawa District, Fukushima
- Ishikawa District, Ishikawa
- Ishikawa Goemon
- Hideo Ishikawa
- Kaoru Ishikawa
- Ishikawa Prefecture
- Ishikawa Takuboku
- Ishikawa, Fukushima
- Ishikawa, Okinawa
- Ishikawajima Ne-20
- Ishinomaki, Miyagi
- Ishioka, Ibaraki
- Ishite-ji
- Kanji Ishiwara
- Yojiro Ishizaka
- ISO/IEC 2022
- ISO 3166-2:JP
- Isobe, Mie
- Isoroku Yamamoto's sleeping giant quote
- Issan Ichinei
- Issei
- Isshiki, Aichi
- Isshin-ryū
- Issun-bōshi
- Isuzu

== It ==
- Itabashi, Tokyo
- Itadaki Street
- Itadori, Gifu
- Itagaki Seishiro
- Itagaki Taisuke
- Tomonobu Itagaki
- Itai-itai disease
- Itako
- Juzo Itami
- Itami, Hyogo
- Itano District, Tokushima
- Itano, Tokushima
- Itō (name)
- Ito District, Wakayama
- Itō Hirobumi
- Ichiro Ito
- Junji Ito
- Noe Ito
- Itō Sachio
- Shunya Ito
- Itō's lemma
- ITOCHU
- Itoda, Fukuoka
- Itoigawa, Niigata
- Itoman, Okinawa
- Itoshima District, Fukuoka
- Itsuki, Kumamoto
- Itsukushima Shrine
- Itsunen Shoyu
- Itsuo Tsuda
- Itsuwa, Kumamoto

== Iw ==
- Iwade, Wakayama
- Iwagi, Ehime
- Iwai, Ibaraki
- Iwaki
- Iwaki, Fukushima
- Iwaki Province
- Iwakuni, Yamaguchi
- Iwakura, Aichi
- Iwakura mission
- Iwakura Tomomi
- Iwama, Ibaraki
- Iwami District, Tottori
- Iwami Province
- Iwami, Shimane
- Iwami, Tottori
- Iwamura, Gifu
- Shunji Iwai
- Iwamizawa, Hokkaidō
- Iwanuma, Miyagi
- Iwasawa theory
- Iwase Province
- Iwashimizu Hachimangū
- Iwashiro Province
- Iwata, Shizuoka
- Iwata District, Shizuoka
- Satoru Iwata
- Iwataki, Kyoto
- Tōru Iwatani
- Iwate Prefecture
- Iwato
- Iwatsuki-ku, Saitama
- Iwo Jima

== Iy ==
- Iyabohn
- Iyo
- Iyo District, Ehime
- Iyo Province
- Iyo, Ehime
- Iyomishima, Ehime

== Iz ==
- Izanagi
- Izanami
- Izena, Okinawa
- Izu
- Izu Islands
- Izu Peninsula
- Izu Province
- Izu, Shizuoka
- Izumi
- Izumi District, Kagoshima
- Kyōka Izumi
- Izumi Province
- Izumi, Kagoshima
- Izumi, Kumamoto
- Izumi, Osaka
- Izumi-ku, Sendai
- Izumiotsu, Osaka
- Izumisano, Osaka
- Izumo
- Izumo, Shimane
- Izumo Province
- Izumo Taisha
- Izunagaoka, Shizuoka
- Izushi District, Hyogo
- Izushi, Hyogo
