= Aizen-in =

Coordinates: 34°8′23.63″N 134°26′21.35″E

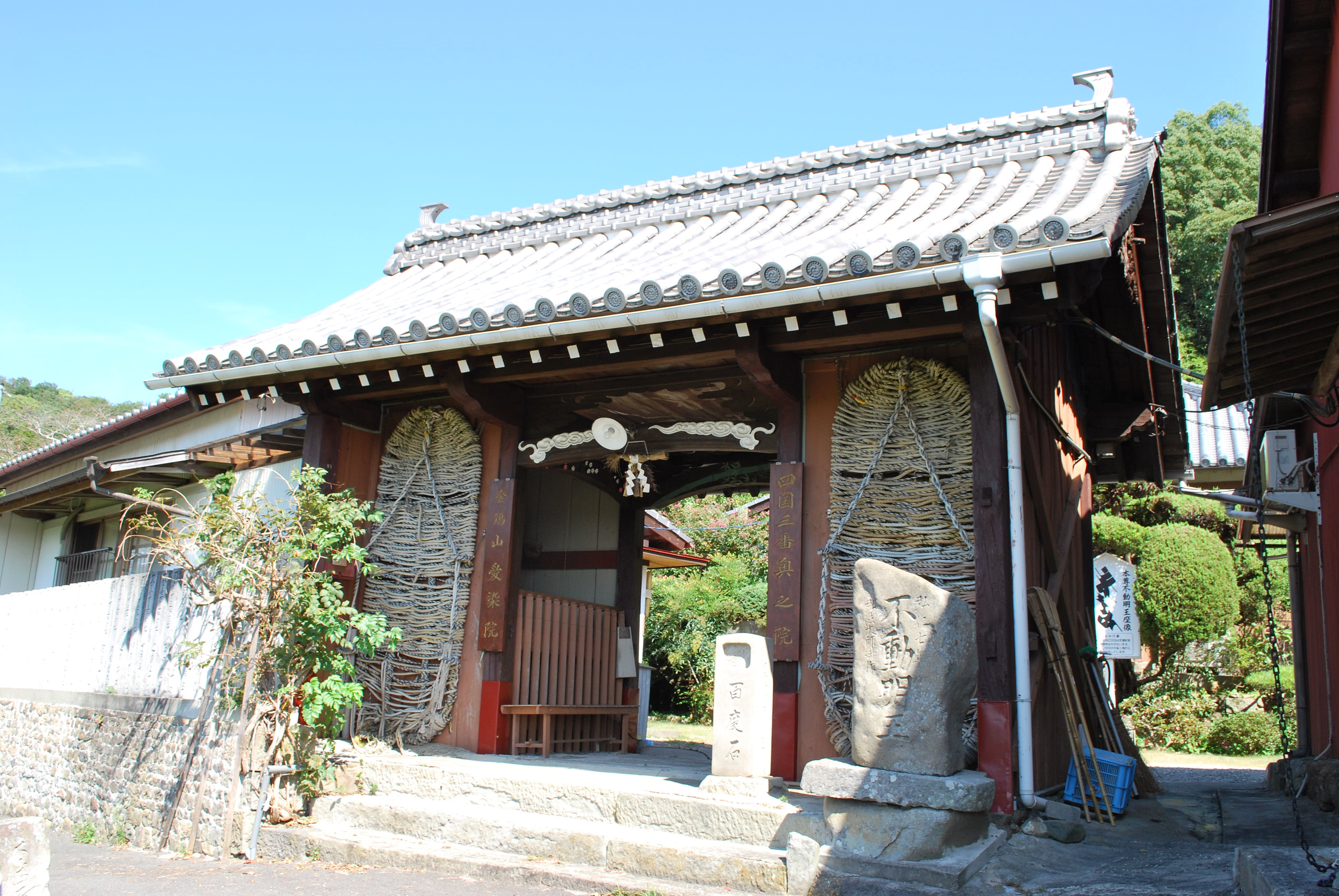
Gate leading to Aizen-in

Aizen-in (愛染院) is a Kōya-san Shingon temple in Itano, Tokushima Prefecture, Japan. This is the temple of Inner Sanctum of No.3 Konsen-ji Temple. The temple is said to have been founded by Kōbō Daishi in 815, who also carved the main image of Fudō Myōō. This temple is placed on the Shikoku Pilgrimage Trail. More 2 km to No.4 Dainichi-ji temple from here.

== For the people from other countries ==
There is some information for rough sleeping. Please ask in this temple.

== See also ==
- Dainichi-ji
- Jizō-ji
