= Yugeshima Shōen ruins =

Yugeshima sheon

Coordinates: 34°16′28″N 133°13′04″E

Yugeshima Shōen Site
- 弓削島荘遺跡 (Japanese)
- Yugeshima shōen Site Yugeshima Shōen ruins (Japan)
- Type: settlement
- Periods: Heian to Kamakura period
- Location: Kamijima, Ehime, Japan
- Region: Shikoku

History
- Built: 10th-12th century

Site notes
- Condition: ruins
- Public access: Yes

The Yugeshima Shōen site (弓削島荘遺跡, Yugeshima-shō iseki) is an archaeological site consisting of the ruins of a Heian to Kamakura period shōen located on the island of Yugeshima in the Seto Inland Sea, Japan. Administratively, the area is now part of the town of Kamijima, Ehime. The site been protected as a National Historic Site since 2021. This manor is particularly famous because salt was the annual tribute, and it provided important materials for the study of the medieval salt industry.

== Overview ==
Yugejima is a small 8.61 square kilometres (3.32 sq mi) island in the Geiyo Islands in between Ehime and Hiroshima Prefectures. In the 12th century, a shōen was established on the island by retired Emperor Go-Toba. The estate was later inherited by Emperor Go-Shirakawa and afterwards became the property of the temple of Tō-ji in Kyoto.

The shōen or landed estates were private, tax-free, and autonomous feudal manors which arose with the decline of the ritsuryō system. The earliest shōen developed in the Nara period to encourage land reclamation and provided for the succession of the right to cultivate reclaimed fields in perpetuity. Later shōen developed from land tracts assigned to officially sanctioned Shintō shrines or Buddhist temples or granted by the emperor as gifts to the Imperial relatives, nobles, or officials as tax-free grants. In either case, as these estates grew, they became independent of the civil administrative system and contributed to the rise of a local military class. At first, the hereditary steward of the estate (jitō) paid a portion of his revenues to the nominal "owner" in Kyoto for continued protection from taxes or other interference from the government, but by the Kamakura period, even this nominal relationship faded away.

The Yugeshima shōen is unusual in that its primary production was sea salt, and that detailed taxation documents have survived, including the names of the 22 families settled on the island and their allotment of fields for farms and section of the coast for salt pans. At the end of the 13th century, during the Shōō era (1288–93), Tōji was involved in a conflict with its jitō, the Komiya clan, over ownership of Yugejima shōen. The plaintiffs brought a lawsuit to the Shogun's court in Kamakura, but the litigation took several years until a verdict was handed down. The cost of the lawsuit was therefore enormous for both parties, and written records the remittances between Kyoto and Kamakura are noteworthy as an early example of money transfer. The lawsuit was finally settled with a division of the estate, with two-thirds going to Tōji and one-third to the Komiya clan. However, from the middle of the 14th century onwards, the estate was seized by the Kobayakawa clan and disappears from history.

The National Historic Site designation encompasses seven separate locations on the island which correspond to sites listed in a Kamakura period map of the estate.

== See also ==
- List of Historic Sites of Japan (Ehime)
