= Haruchika (given name) =

- Gender: Male

Origin
- Origin: Japanese
- Meaning: Different meanings depending on the kanji used

Haruchika (written: 治親 or 晴哉) is a masculine Japanese given name. Notable people with the name include:

- Haruchika Aoki (青木 治親) (born 1976), Japanese motorcycle racer
- Haruchika Noguchi (野口 晴哉) (1911–1976), Japanese writer
