= Yuge, Ehime =

Yuge, Ehime 弓削町, Yuge-chō
- Town
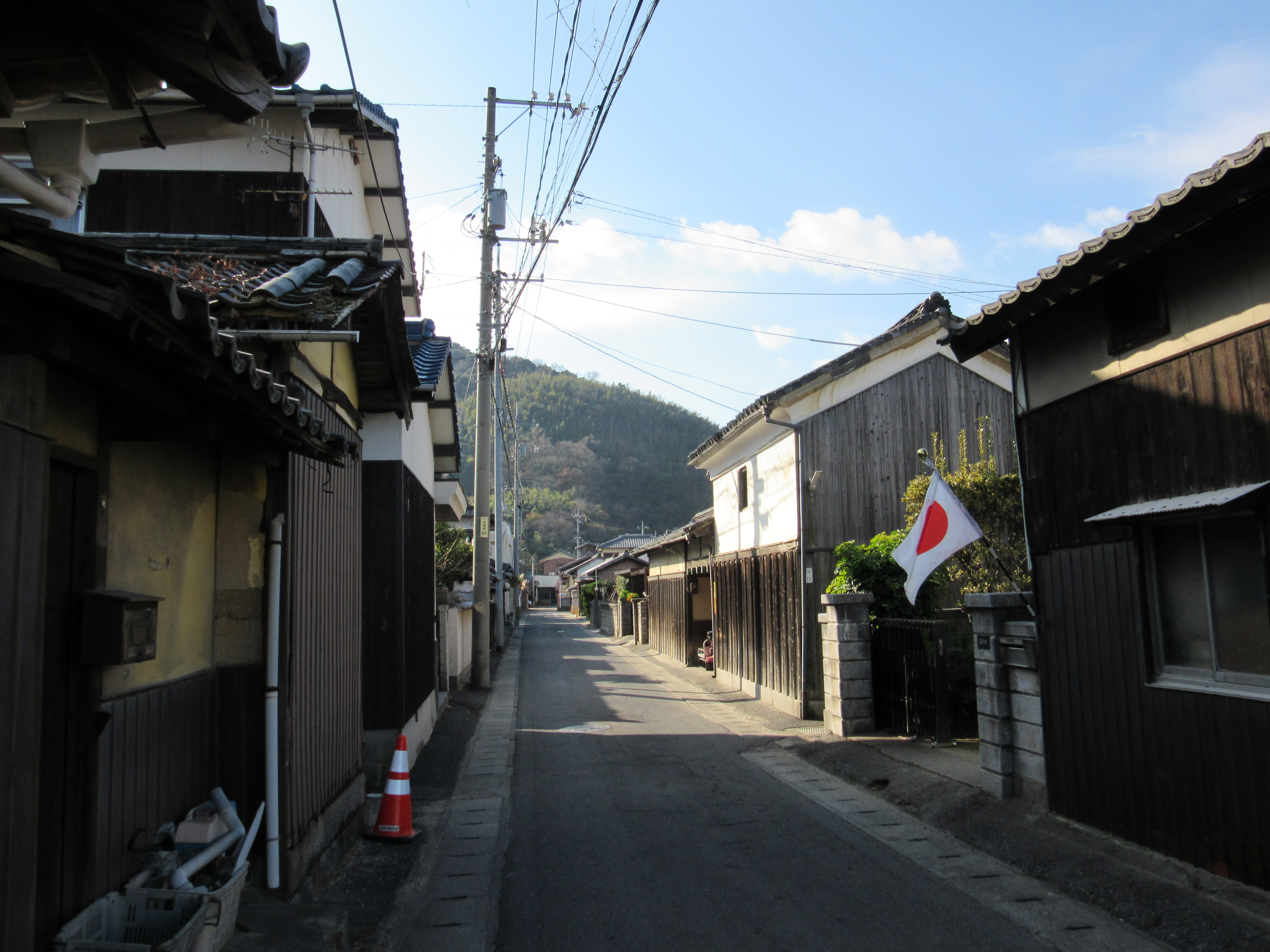
- Kamiyuge hamlet
- Interactive map of Yuge, Ehime
- Country: Japan
- Region: Shikoku
- Island: Shikoku
- Prefecture: Ehime
- District: Ochi
- Elevated to town: January 1, 1953
- Merged into Kamijima: October 1, 2004

Population (2003)
  - Total: 3,683

Yuge (弓削町, Yuge-chō) was a town located in Ochi District, Ehime Prefecture, Japan.

The municipality consisted of the four inhabited islands of Yugeshima, Sashima, Teshima, and Hyakkanjima. The town office was located in Yugeshima (now Kamishima Town Hall).

Yugeshima Village was established with the creation of the modern municipalities system on December 15, 1889. In September 1895, Uoshima became a separate village. Yuge was elevated to town status on January 1, 1953.

As of 2003, the town had an estimated population of 3,683 and a density of 312.91 persons per km^{2}. The total area was 11.77 km^{2}.

On October 1, 2004, the town of Yuge was merged with the villages of Ikina, Iwagi and Uoshima (all from Ochi District) to create the town of Kamijima and no longer exists as an independent municipality.
