= Yugeshima =

Japanese Inhabited island

Native name: 弓削島
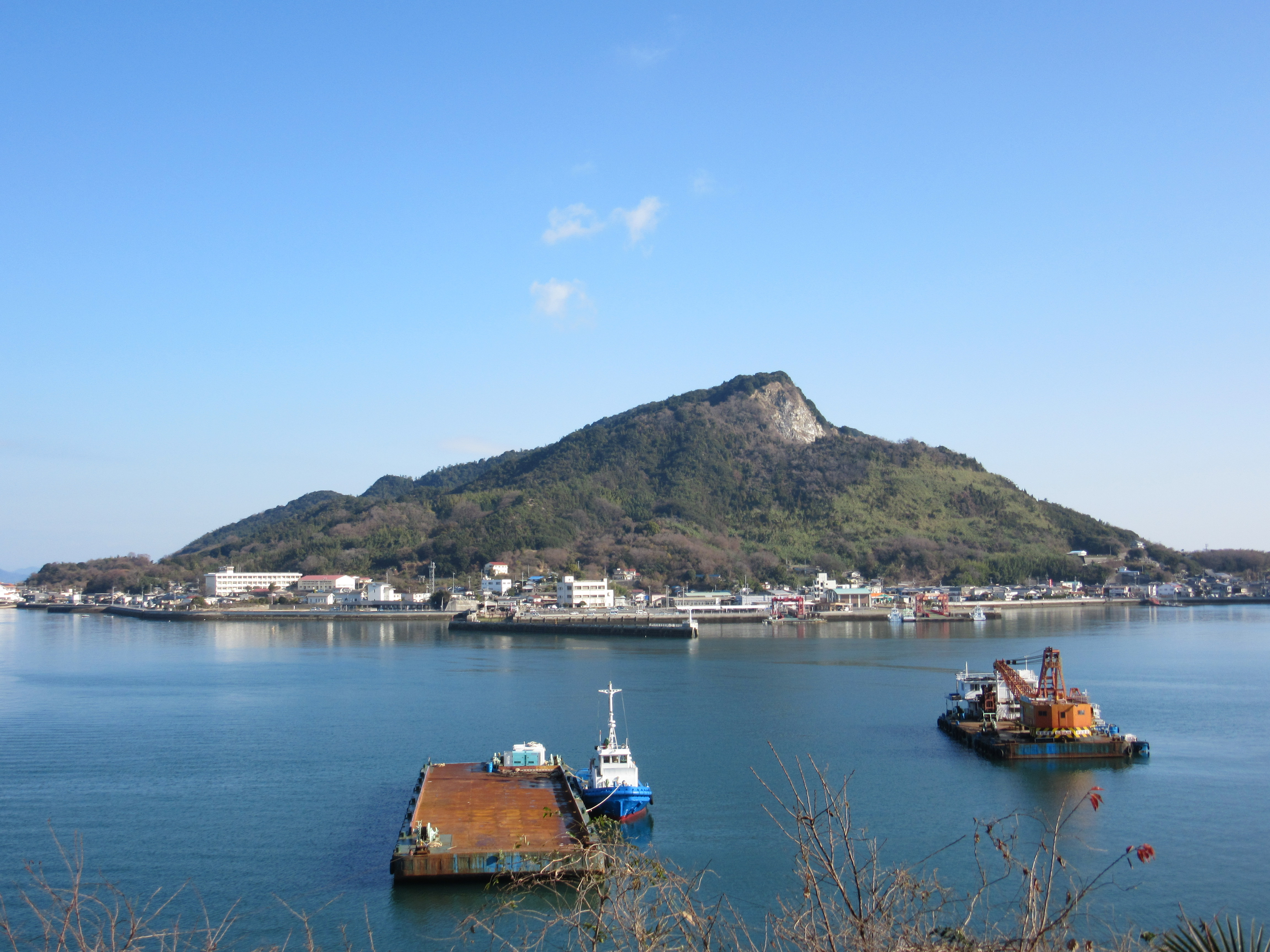

- Location within Ehime Prefecture Location within Japan

Geography
- Location: Kamijima, Ehime
- Coordinates: 34°16′7″N 133°12′59.8″E
- Archipelago: Geiyo Islands (Seto Inland Sea)
- Area: 8.61 km^{2} (3.32 sq mi)
- Highest elevation: 210 m (690 ft)

Administration
- Japan

Demographics
- Population: 2835 (2015)
- Pop. density: 329.26/km^{2} (852.78/sq mi)
- Ethnic groups: Japanese

Yugeshima (弓削島) is an inhabited island located in northeastern Ehime Prefecture, Japan, in the Seto Inland Sea between Shikoku and Honshu. The island is part of the Geiyo Islands archipelago, and is administratively the seat of the town of Kamijima, Ehime.

== Geography ==
Yugeshima has a total area of 8.61 square kilometres (3.32 sq mi). The island is mostly hilly, with its highest point at 210 meters above sea level. Much of the island consists of limestone.

== History ==
Yugeshima has been inhabited since prehistoric times. Kushiyama Kofun on Yugeshima is a burial mound dating from the Kofun period. Around the end of the Heian period, the island was the center of a shōen landed estate (Yuge Island Shōen ruins) controlled by retired Emperor Go-Shirakawa and was noted for its production of salt. The estate later became property of the temple of Tō-ji in Kyoto and its detailed records from the Kamakura period are regarded as a valuable historic resource. The island became part of Yuge Village in Ehime Prefecture, with the establishment of the modern municipalities system on December 15, 1889. Yuge was elevated to town status on January 1, 1953. The town merged with the villages of Ikina, Iwagi and Uoshima (all from Ochi District) to become the town of Kamijima on October 1, 2004. The primary occupations on the island are centered on commercial fishing.
