= Seitai =

Japanese form of bodywork and alternative medicine

Seitai (整体) is a form of bodywork and alternative medicine practice, originally developed as training tool within Health Education. It was developed in Japan by Haruchika Noguchi (1911–1976) in the mid-20th century. The kanji comprising the word are 整 sei, regulated, coordinated, in order, and 体 tai, "body, organism", therefore translated together as "the body in order".

The term seitai already existed in traditional Chinese medicine for centuries. In the 1920s it was adapted and introduced Japan by Michio Takahashi, a master of seitai-jutsu, and later by Noguchi from 1943. Important to its development was a regular meeting group of experts in various fields of traditional Japanese medicine, led by Noguchi, called Dainippon Rengō Chiryō-shikai.

Seitai is known in Europe due to its practice by Itsuo Tsuda beginning in 1972 (with dojos in Paris, Geneva, Milan, Rome, Madrid, and Palma de Mallorca) and Katsumi Mamine in Barcelona the following year.

== Historical background ==
The origin of the word "seitai" is set forth in a work in Japanese by Michio Takahashi, a master of seitaijutsu (正体術) very popular in the early 1920s. Mallory Fromm sums it up like this:

According to reliable sources, the term "seitai" comes from classical Chinese medicine and has been known for centuries. At the beginning of the 20th century, this word was more popular, but with different ideograms.

Michio Takahashi already used the term "seitai". The ideogram for "sei" is 正, which means "natural, correct", although Takahashi used it as a verb. Takahashi speaks of seitai as "tadashii karada" (正體), "the conforming body" (correct/proper body). The term for body, karada (體), comes from classical Chinese; this fact suggests that Takahashi wanted to guide his school in a specific line.

It was also written "seitai" with the ideogram 正体, a new kanji for writing "body" that gave it a more modern approach. Later it appeared with the spelling, 正胎, which can be translated as "the conforming womb". This gave rise to the term seitaijutsu written like this: 正胎術, which would be translated as "the art of the conforming womb". Later, it drifted towards 生体, the «living body». And, finally, as 意教, "to put the body in the best possible order", a term that Noguchi made public in 1943. This writing of the word "seitai" became the reference and is currently known as "Seitai Noguchi ».

== Seitai Noguchi ==
Seitai culture was developed by Haruchika Noguchi in Japan after World War II. Noguchi collaborated and coordinated a group of prominent experts in traditional Japanese medicine, who met periodically during World War II. Yoshida Naoki thus describes the composition of this group:

Before and after the war, there was an organization called Dainippon Rengo Chiryoshikai, under the direction of Haruchika Noguchi. I remember Akiko, Noguchi's wife, saying to me: "In hindsight, this seems to have been the happiest period of his life." In fact, it is likely that this was because seitai sōhō had reached its maturity, so this period was the time when the philosophy of seitai took shape.

=== The Dainippon Rengo Chiryoshikai group ===
The Dainippon Rengo Chiryoshikai group was made up of top level individuals in the world of traditional therapeutics in Japan. Master Noguchi never gave names but, as far as is known, they were all relevant members, eager to share their secrets and the traditions they knew. For each type of sōhō, only the results of experiences based on the treatment of twenty people or more were accepted. In this way, members presented more consistent results and, from that moment on, seitai sōhō was considered a preferred therapeutic method.

Some eminent members of the group:

- The famous Master Gosaku Nonaka, who could quickly cure skin diseases.
- Master Uzo Nagamatsu, who had discovered the "Nagamatsu point", also called "detox point" (5th point of the abdomen).
- Master Seiji Miyamawari, known for diagnosing diseases with the only indications he obtained by touching the coccyx.
- Master Kazumichi Shibata, founder of sokushindo, which focused on the feet and hands.
- Master Shinichi Yamada practiced puraana sōhō [prāṇha sōhō], a technique related to yukihō.

It seems that there was also master Ryotaro Kajima who invented 978 techniques (sōhō), of chiropractors and acupuncturists, and he was a master who traveled on foot through fishing villages all over Japan, all the while researching soseihō, a resuscitation technique traditional.

Noguchi called them his "colleagues" even though he entered into competition with them. Chiwaki Matsumoto, of Reigaku Dōjō, is the master who exerted the most important influence on Master Noguchi. There was also Kyotsuki Matsubara who discovered katsugen undō. One can clearly distinguish the trace of Michio Takahashi, the founder of seitaijutsu, another master who preceded Noguchi.

Master Noguchi, based on his sensibility, gradually incorporated among the technical details that these other masters shared. It incorporated elements from observable effects to then apply them in the development of seitai sōhō. It can be said that this is the least known story of the seitai.

This list should be completed with Keizo Hashimoto, inventor of Sōtai (操体), and Tsunezo Ishii, creator of the "living ki" method from which Noguchi acknowledged having been greatly inspired. The therapy of the latter is closely connected with katsugen undō:

Tsunezo Ishii (1875– ?) was a great general of the Japanese army. Retired in 1923, he returned from America after serving in the Japanese Embassy. He formed the Seiki Kenkyujo (Living Ki Research Institute). This institute aimed to use the healing powers of ki for a "living ki self-reinforcement therapy" (生気自強療療 seiki jikyō ryōhō). He published three books on this therapy in 1925. He used the nervous system to arouse spontaneous movement.

== Noguchi's perspective ==
Haruchika Noguchi, had studied many Eastern and Western therapeutic methods in a self-taught manner. But Seitai Noguchi is not only based on the knowledge of therapeutic methods or observations related to health, but also on teachings of Tao and Zen.[16] However, in the fifties, when he was already about forty years old, he decided to give up the therapeutic approach. Itsuo Tsuda, a writer and philosopher who studied with him, describes this change in perspective as follows:

«When he [H. Noguchi] managed to cure someone's weak stomach, the patient began to eat excessively and came back but with pain in the liver; it was a simple transfer, a change of illness. People started doing nonsense without taking into account the needs of their bodies, with the idea that it was enough to go to see Noguchi to get well. He became the repairer of the mistakes made by his patients. A significant degree of dependency had been established. When he was away on a trip, his patients were restless and sick. Trying to remove the patient's crutches, he himself was another crutch, but this time even bigger. That's when he came to develop the concept of Seitai, so that people could walk with their own feet. You have to learn to use your own body.»

Seitai rests on Noguchi's postulate that the body has a natural ability to rebalance itself in a way that ensures its proper functioning. Otherwise, it loses this ability when used inappropriately; loses sensitivity (desensitizes), or becomes apathetic. The Seitai aims to restore this sensitivity and these capacities of self-regulation or rebalancing.

According to Haruchika Noguchi, by seeking an easier life or seeking protection to achieve good health, the body weakens:

«All animals live by receiving external changes as stimuli, and adapt to them. To adapt means to live by modifying the shape or functions of the body so that it accommodates itself to the environment. Only human beings consider it healthy to live by adapting the environment to their needs. For this reason, it constantly makes efforts to alter this environment. To get here faster, I came by car, but if we make this a comfortable daily activity, our legs will gradually weaken and as they weaken, we will have more initiatives to avoid the effort of walking. There is also the food: we have found ways to make it more digestible, by boiling it, or roasting it, or dressing it. But if you don't boil them, or roast them then you think it will be difficult to eat; and if the food is not very digestible, the stomach will find it difficult, because the stomach has also adapted to this situation.[] So every time we adapt the environment to ourselves, the need arises to do new improvements to facilitate digestion and we become even weaker [...] But this does not mean that we have lost our natural faculty, that is not why we become weak.»

According to this conception, health is considered in a particular way: disease is nothing more than the symptom of a body trying to restore its balance, and it will become a chronic disease when the resources to restore health are lacking or hindered. Haruchika Noguchi spoke of it like this: "If it hurts, it hurts, right? If it hurts, it is because the forces of the body come together, the connections throughout the body are activated and the injury is repaired. Pain, high fever and diarrhea are recovery activities of the body.»
