= Haruchika Noguchi =

Japanese founder of Seitai

- Born: 7 September 1911; Ueno, Tokyo, Japan
- Died: 22 June 1976 (aged 64); Japan
- Occupation: Seitai founder

Haruchika Noguchi (野口 晴哉, Noguchi Haruchika; September 1911 – 1976) was the Japanese founder of Seitai. He established the concept of taiheki.

== Students ==
- Itsuo Tsuda
- Masatomi Ikeda
- Katsumi Mamine

== Books ==
Among his many books, three are now available in English translation.

- Order, Spontaneity and the Body by Haruchika Noguchi. Tokyo, Japan, Zensei, 1985, paperback. ISBN 4-915417-00-X.
- Colds and their Benefits by Haruchika Noguchi. Tokyo, Japan, Zensei, 1986, paperback. ISBN 4-915417-01-8.
- Scolding and Praising by Haruchika Noguchi. Tokyo, Japan, Zensei, 1991, paperback. ISBN 4-915417-02-6. Seitai Inteligencia Vital de Laura López Coto. 2015 ISBN 978-84-944640-0-3 (castellano)

| Preceded by (none) | Dōshu of Seitai ?? - 1976 | Succeeded by Akiko Noguchi |
