= Dainichi-ji (Itano) =

Coordinates: 34°9′4.7″N 134°25′51.2″E

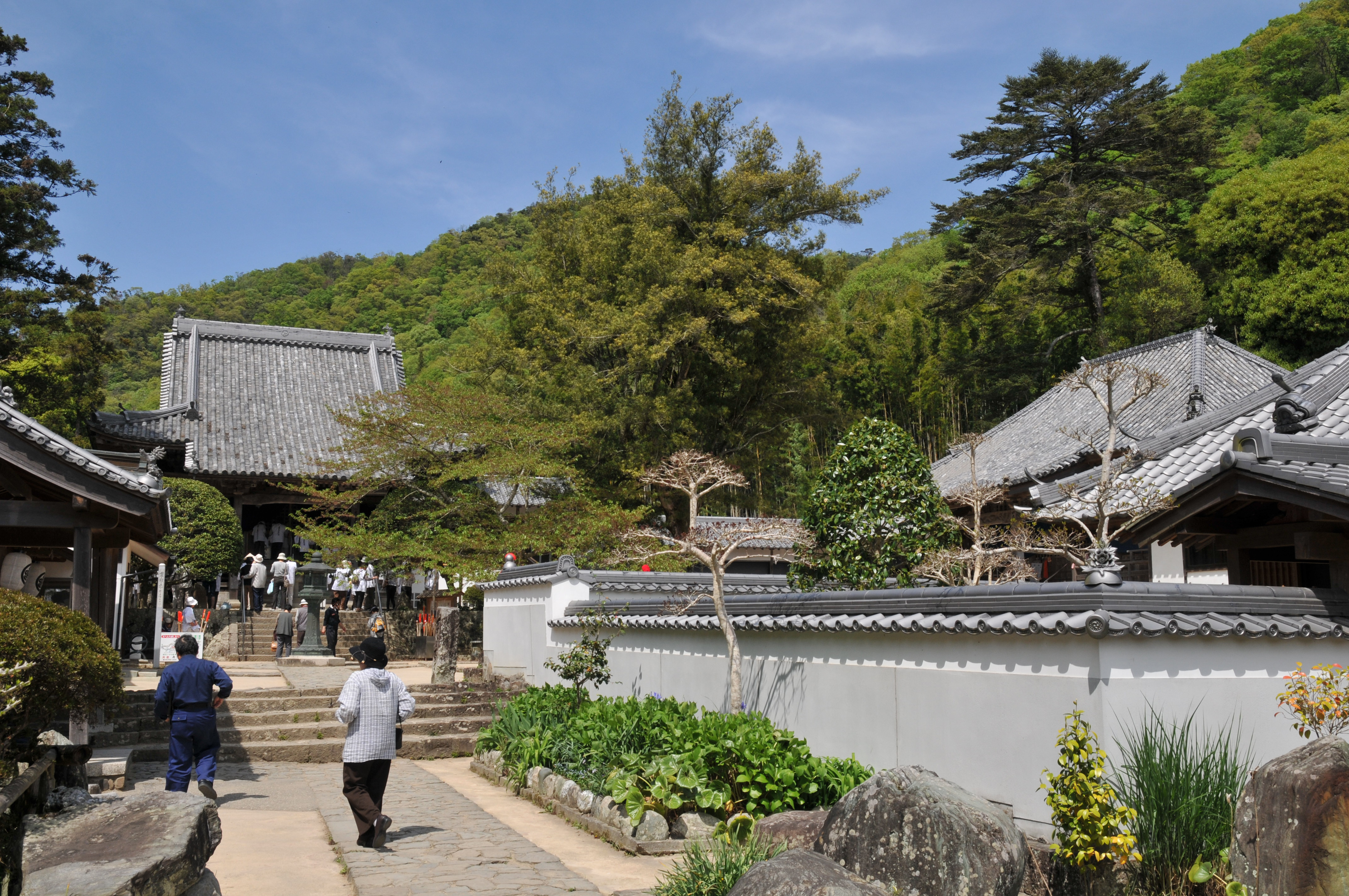
Dainichi-ji

Dainichi-ji (大日寺) is a Tōji Shingon temple in Itano, Tokushima Prefecture, Japan. Temple 4 on the Shikoku 88 temple pilgrimage, the main image is of Dainichi Nyorai. The temple is said to have been founded by Kōbō Daishi, who carved the image.

== See also ==
- Aizen-in
- Shikoku 88 temple pilgrimage
