= Jizō-ji (Itano) =

Coordinates: 34°08′14″N 134°25′55″E

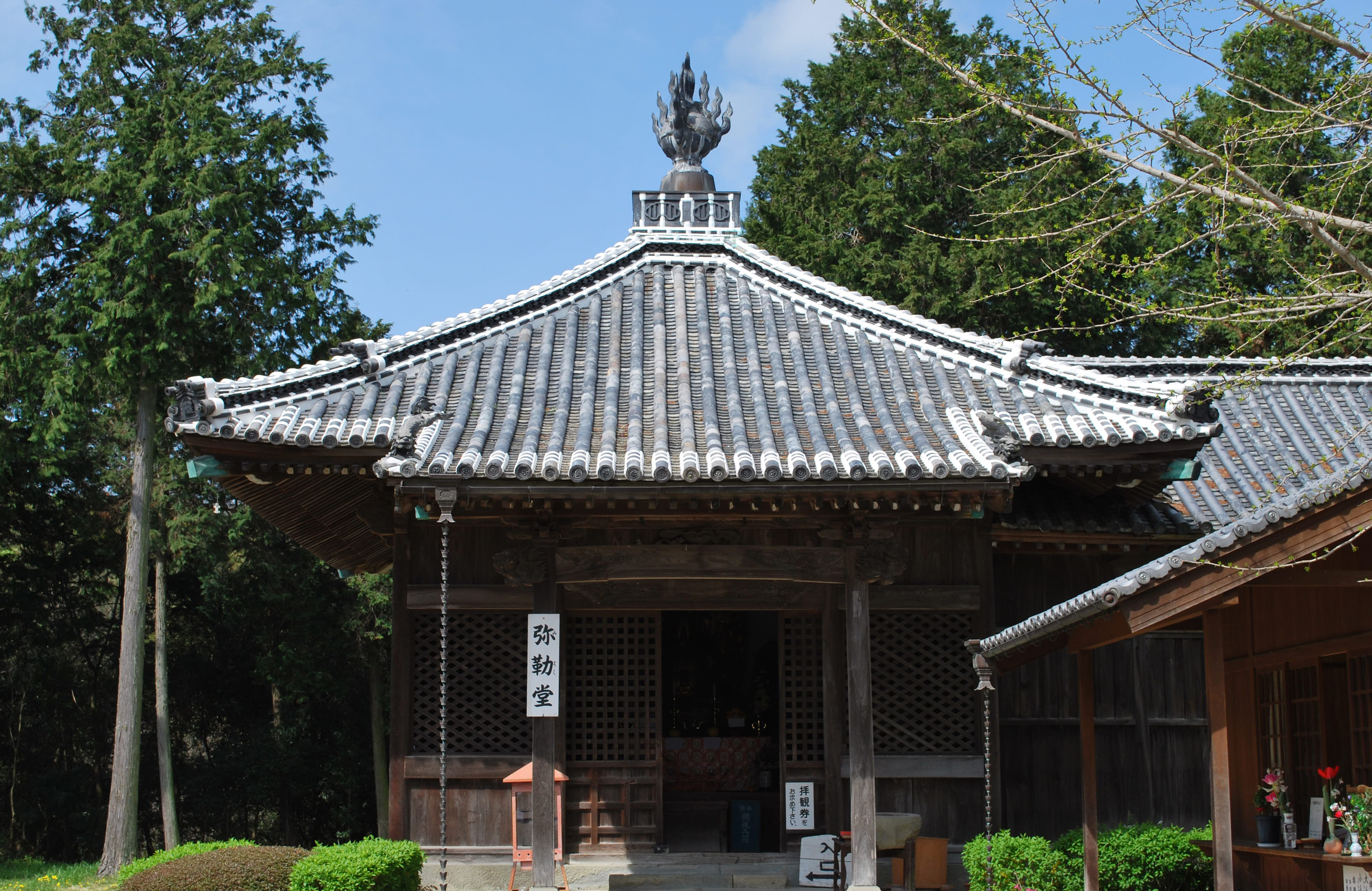
Jizō-ji Gohyakurakandō

Jizō-ji (地蔵寺) is an Omuro Shingon temple in Itano, Tokushima Prefecture, Japan. Temple 5 on the Shikoku 88 temple pilgrimage, the main image is of Enmei Jizō Bosatsu. The temple is said to have been founded by Kōbō Daishi, who carved the image. The Hondō (1711–16), Daishidō (1711–16), Fudōdō (1751–1830), Kyōgura (1810), and Gohyakurakandō (1922) have all been placed on the cultural properties register.

== See also ==
- Aizen-in
- Shikoku 88 temple pilgrimage
