= Katsumi Mamine =

Japanese seitai expert and researcher

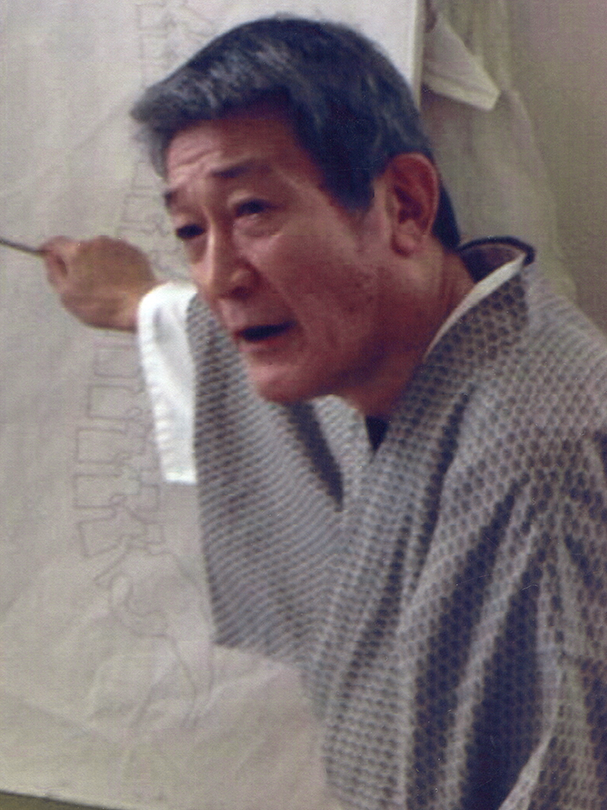
- Born: 31 March 1944; Tokyo, Japan
- Died: 14 April 2020 (aged 76); Barcelona
- Occupation: Seitai

Katsumi Mamine Miwa (March 31, 1944 – April 14, 2020) was a seitai expert and researcher. He had been a disciple of Haruchika Noguchi, the founder of seitai, and was the one who introduced and spread seitai as a culture in Catalonia, from 1973 until his death in 2020.

Throughout his life, Mamine constantly delved deeper into the practice and study of seitai, highlighting that the most important aspect is its simplicity, both in the practice and the knowledge.

== Biography ==
Katsumi was born in Tokyo on March 31, 1944. He was the second son of Ryoji, a physicist, and Hiroko, a woman closely linked to the cultural world and with a close relationship with the music pedagogue Shin’ichi Suzuki. Katsumi spent his childhood in a very cultural environment where music was important topic. At age ten, he was encouraged by his mother to learn about seitai, so he started to attend regularly the dojo of its founder, Haruchika Noguchi, of whom he would later become a direct disciple until his Master's death in 1976.

Suzuki had founded a music education center in Matsumoto, where he developed his method (Suzuki Method). Hiroko met him there. The connection between musical education and Noguchi's seitai is captured in this autobiographical comment by Katsumi:

"My mother, who was from Tokyo, was in this city (Matsumoto) during that time because of World War II and, passionate about Suzuki's teaching, collaborated with him as a secretary practically since the founding of the school. When she had to return to Tokyo, she met Master Noguchi and was surprised by the similarity of their approaches. She wanted them to meet and, one day when Suzuki went to Tokyo, she introduced one to each other."

=== Seitai of Barcelona ===
Despite being a brilliant student in science, upon reaching university age, he decided to access an Fine Arts degree. Having completed his university studies, in 1969 he wanted to breathe the air and culture of Pau Casals, a musician whom he highly appreciated, and decided to move to Barcelona. Mamine's intention was to undertake personal work and delve into his artistic expression. However, in 1973, after several years of personal uncertainty, he found a direct connection with what he had learned from Master Noguchi and decided to professionally dedicate himself to seitai. In 1975, the Seitai of Barcelona Dojo was inaugurated and for several years there was a close relationship with the Seitai Kyokai Society of Japan.

In addition to his work in attending many people individually on a daily basis and coordinating practice meetings in various locations in Catalonia, Mamine began teaching Seitai Soho to some students. Furthermore, he started to adapt and translate Master Noguchi's written texts into Spanish, having received authorization from Noguchi himself with the aim to distribute them exclusively among the seitai students in Barcelona. These translations were published as the content of a new Zensei Magazine, which Mamine directed, and 67 volumes were published from July 1977 to December 1991.

Among the notable artists to whom he attended individually as a seitai instructor, are György Sebok, Narciso Yepes, Antoni Ros Marbà, Cesc Gelabert, Lluís Claret, Gerard Claret, and others, as well as many yoga professional teachers or other bodily disciplines. Some of his students have started seitai dojos all over Catalonia (Barcelona, Mataró, Terrassa, Cerdanyola, Sant Pere de Ribes, Reus, etc.) and other locations in Spain.

== His research regarding the structure of spontaneous movement ==
Katsumi ended up reorganizing Noguchi's language about the five movements and the structure of spontaneous movement, of taiheki, and he also objectified the knowledge that his master had developed. In Japanese culture empirical knowledge has always been recognized and valued and there had not been a specific need of relying on a more objective vision, which is more characteristic of science. In the Western context, this is different.

His studies focused on being able to provide a more wide knowledge about the matter, on filling the great gap that our culture suffers from in understanding human nature and how this specific nature generates an expression that arises directly from it. Therefore, in his written work, he delves into the understanding of various fields of knowledge such as biology, anatomy, embryology, among others.

== Publications ==
He has published several books:

- El cuerpo es... Un concepto del seitai (1983) Ed. K. Mamine. ISBN 84-398-0231-5
- Seitai, una nueva comprensión de la naturaleza humana (2007) Ed. Seitai de Barcelona. ISBN 978-84-611-5066-3
- La osei en la vida cotidiana (2007) Ed. Seitai de Barcelona. ISBN 978-84-611-5220-9
- La osei y la CVP ósea (2007) Ed. Seitai de Barcelona. ISBN 978-84-611-5219-3
- La osei y la CVP muscular (2007) Ed. Seitai de Barcelona. ISBN 978-84-611-7058-6
- El movimiento vital (2014). Ed Icaria. ISBN 978-84-9888-586-6
- La vida: las 5 oseis (2016) Ed. Seitai Barcelona. ISBN 978-84-608-5797-6
- Naturaleza humana y Seitai (2018) Ed. Seitai Barcelona. ISBN 978-84-09-01184-1

He wrote two articles for the Zensei Magazine:

- "Desearía que todos conocieran a Noguchi", Zensei núm. 45, p. 4-6. ISSN 0210-1939
- "Consideraciones sobre los Manuscritos acerca de la terapéutica", Zensei núm. 67, p. 27-29. ISSN 0210-1939
