= Kamijima, Ehime =

Kamijima 上島町
- Town
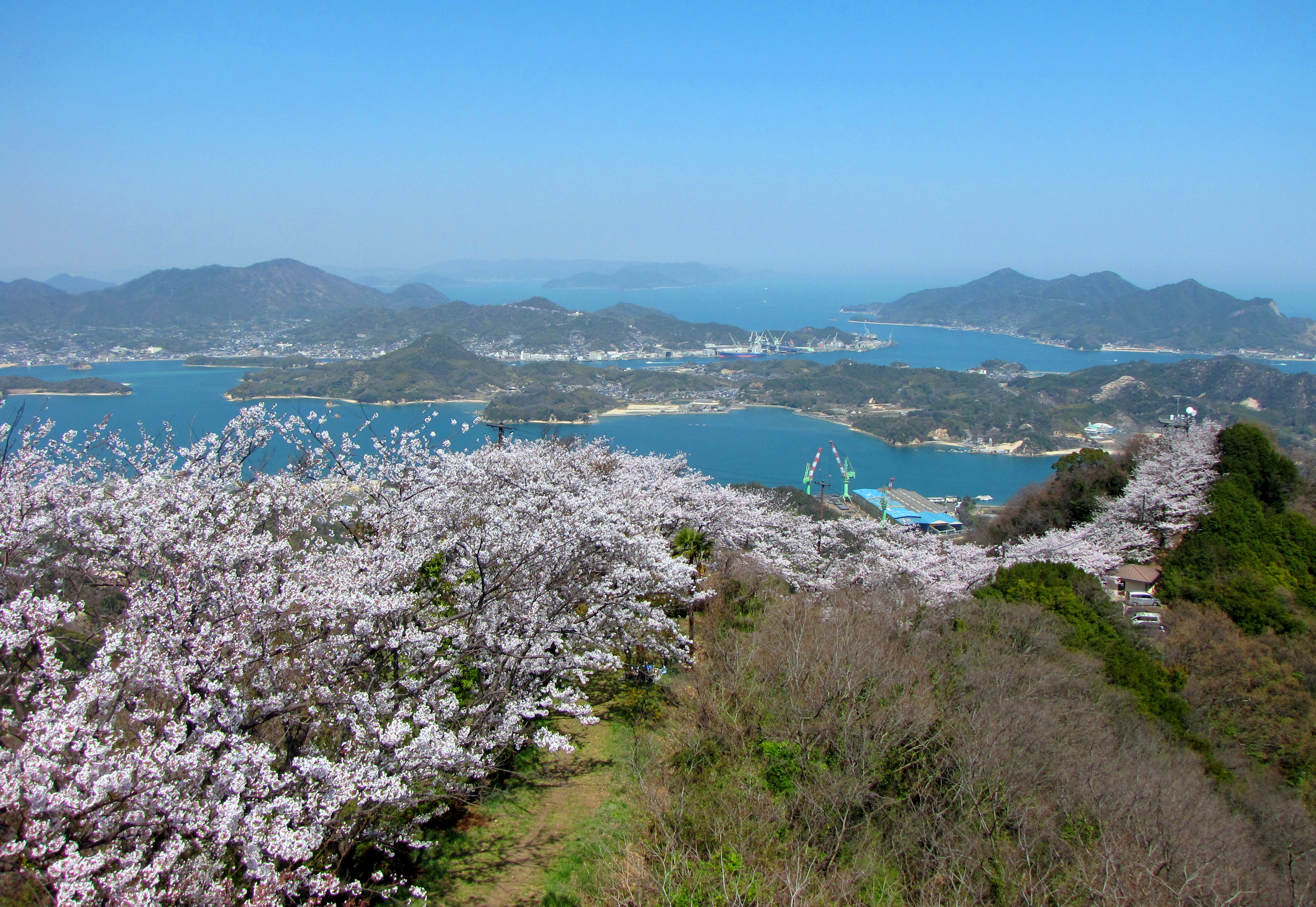
- Iwagi Island from Mt. Sekizen summit (370m)

- Flag Emblem
- Interactive map of Kamijima
- Location in Japan
- Coordinates: 34°15′N 133°12′E
- Country: Japan
- Region: Shikoku
- Prefecture: Ehime
- District: Ochi

Area
  - Total: 30.38 km^{2} (11.73 sq mi)

Population (September 30, 2022)
  - Total: 6,332
  - Density: 208.4/km^{2} (539.8/sq mi)
- Time zone: UTC+09:00 (JST)
- City hall address: 210 Shimoyuge, Yuge, Kamijima-chō, Ochi-gun, Ehime-ken 794-2592
- Website: Official website
- Symbols
- Flower: Sakura (桜)
- Tree: Quercus phillyraeoides (姥目樫, Ubamegashi)

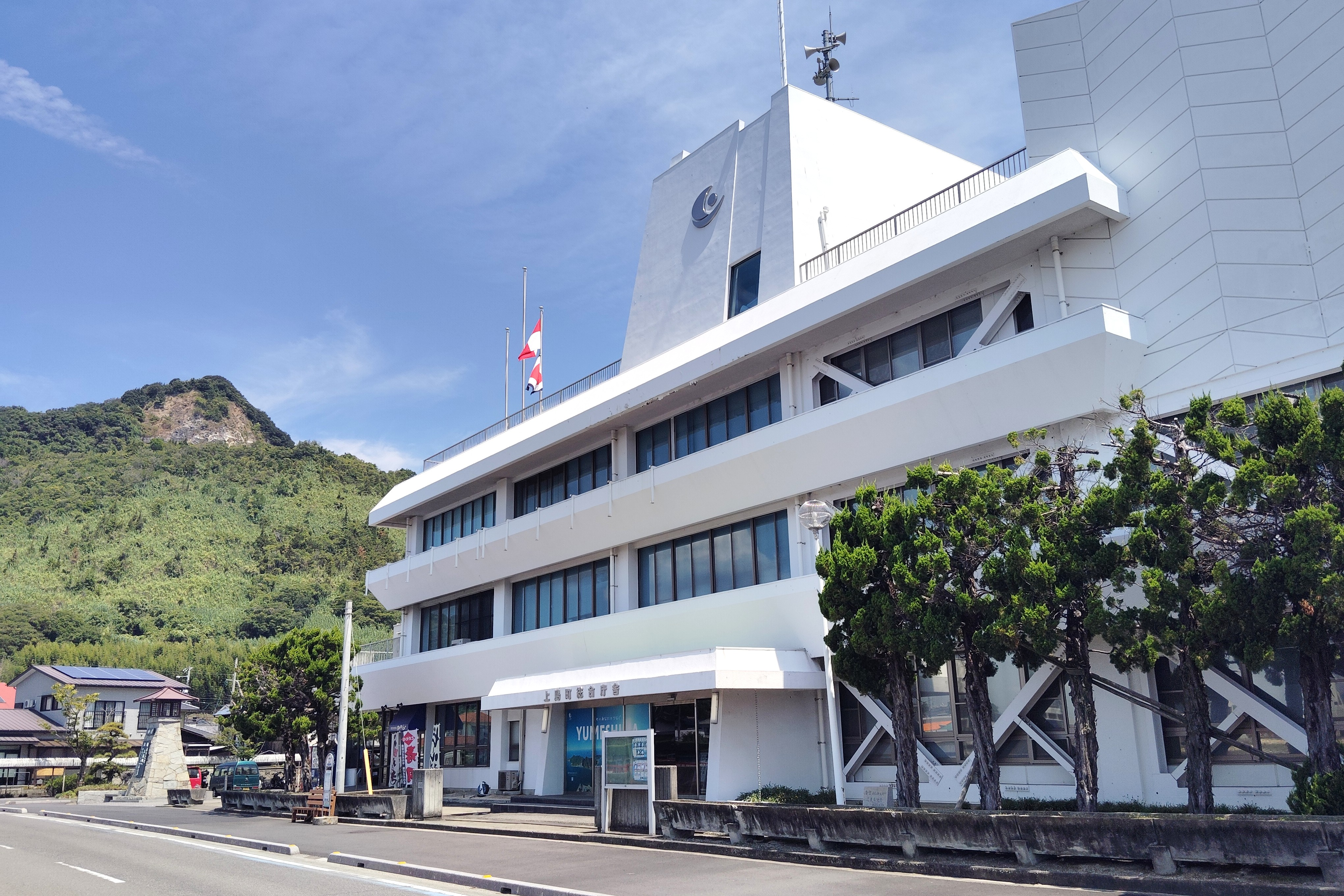
Kamijima Town Hall

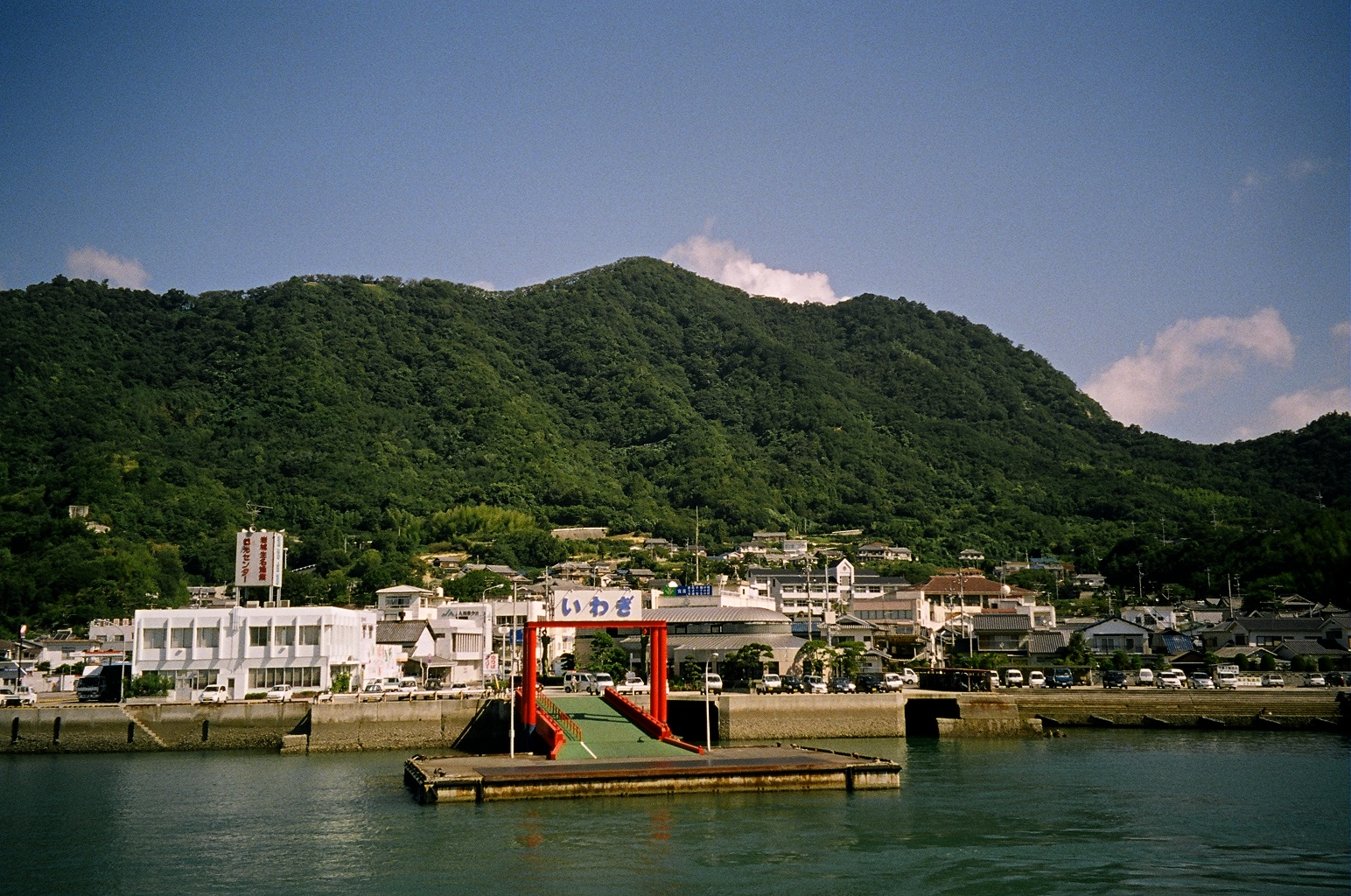
Iwaki port

Kamijima (上島町, Kamijima-chō) is a town located in Ochi District, Ehime Prefecture, Japan. As of 1 September 2022, the town had an estimated population of 6,332 in 3780 households and a population density of 210 persons per km^{2}. The total area of the town is 30.38 square kilometres (11.73 sq mi).

== Geography ==
Kamijima is an archipelago of 25 islands (seven of which are inhabited) the Seto Inland Sea in between Shikoku and Honshu, and is considered a subgroup of the Geiyo Islands. The highest elevation is Mount Sekizen on Iwaki Island, with a height of 370 meters. The main islands are Yugeshima, Sashima, Iwagishima, Akonejima, Tsunamijima, Ikinajima, Uoshima, Takaikamishima, Teshima, Enoshima, Hyakunoshima, Hyakkanjima (the northernmost tip of Ehime Prefecture)

=== Climate ===
Kamijima has a humid subtropical climate (Köppen Cfa) characterized by warm summers and cool winters with light snowfall. The average annual temperature in Kamijima is 15.8 °C. The average annual rainfall is 1418 mm with September as the wettest month. The temperatures are highest on average in January, at around 27.2 °C, and lowest in January, at around 5.2 °C.

== Demographics ==
Per Japanese census data, the population of Kamijima has been generally decreasing since the 1960s and is now less than it was a century ago.

Historical population
Year	Pop.	±%
1920	10,864	—
1930	10,862	−0.0%
1940	10,741	−1.1%
1950	15,552	+44.8%
1960	14,761	−5.1%
1970	13,572	−8.1%
1980	12,669	−6.7%
1990	10,442	−17.6%
2000	8,605	−17.6%
2010	7,648	−11.1%
2020	6,509	−14.9%

== History ==
The area of Kamijima was part of ancient Iyo province, and during the Edo Period was part of the holdings of Iyo-Matsuyama Domain. The islands were strategically important for controlling trade in the Seto Inland Sea and became part of the route for daimyō from far western Japan to travel to-and-from the Shogun's court in Edo as part of their sankin kōtai obligation. The village of Yuge was established on December 15, 1889, with the creation of the modern municipalities system. It was elevated to town status on January 1, 1953. On October 1, 2004, Yuge merged of the villages of Ikina, Iwagi, and Uoshima, to form the town of Kamijima.

== Government ==
Kamijima has a mayor-council form of government with a directly elected mayor and a unicameral town council of 13 members. Kamijima, together with Imabari, contributes six members to the Ehime Prefectural Assembly. In terms of national politics, the town is part of Ehime 2nd district of the lower house of the Diet of Japan.

== Economy ==
The economy of Kamijima is centered on aquaculture, horticulture and nursing care. The area around the islands is noted as a fishing ground for sea bream. Nori seaweed farming has long been popular. Shipbuilding-related industries are located on Iwagishima, including a machinery factory owned by Imabari Shipbuilding.

== Education ==
Kamijima has four public elementary schools and three public middle school operated by the town government, and one public high school operated by the Ehime Prefectural Board of Education.

== Transportation ==
Transportation between the islands is available via land and sea. There are multiple buses running throughout the week, utilising the bridges to carry people all the way from Iwagi to Yuge, using each island's main port as a ticket station. The buses run from Monday to Saturday with some local and national holidays affecting the routine schedule. By sea ferry, a limited service is available via the Imabari - Habu port ferry, which stops at each of the main islands four times a day. Additionally, there are regular car ferries to and from Innoshima from both Ikina and Yuge, as well as an additional car ferry between Iwagi and Ikuchi island. These are the primary ways to access the islands from the mainland and Shimanami Kaido. Additional ferries include the Habu - Mihara ferry which stops at Ikina, and the Habu - Uoshima ferry which stops at Yuge. Besides the car ferries, there is no means of direct access by car to Kamijima.

== Points of interest ==
- Kubota Palm Garden
- Yugeshima Shōen ruins, National Historic Site

== Noted people from Kamijima ==
- Kamijima is the hometown of the British musician David Sinclair.
