= Tokushima College of Technology =

Private university at Itano, Tokushima, Japan

Coordinates: 34°08′33″N 134°26′44″E

- 徳島工業短期大学
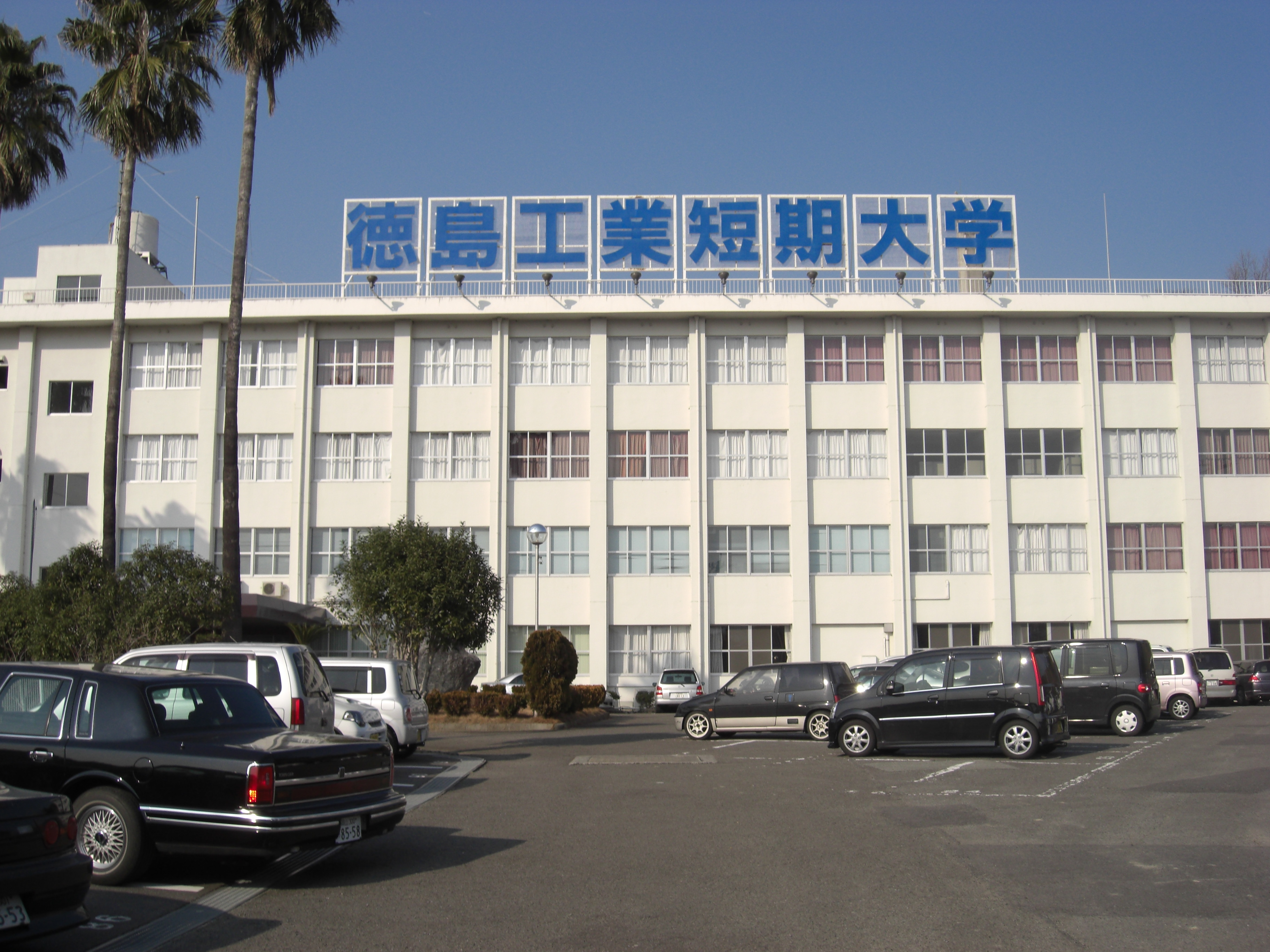
- Type: Private
- Established: 1973
- President: Tetsuhiko Yamamoto
- Location: Itano, Tokushima, Japan

Tokushima College of Technology (徳島工業短期大学, Tokushima Kogyo tanki daigaku) is a private university at Itano, Tokushima, Japan, founded in 1973.
