= Taiheki =

Taiheki Japanese ideogram

Taiheki (体癖、たいへき) is a concept of one's bodily tendency in sensitivity, temperament, movement and personality. The concept was established by Haruchika Noguchi (野口 晴哉), who was the founder and a teacher of Seitai (整体) in Japan. Noguchi said that man's tendency of sensitivity can be divided into five categories, each of which is divided into two types, one of which is active (odd-numbered types) whereas the other of which is passive (even-numbered types). In addition, there are two anomalous types. Thus, 12 types of Taiheki in total have been defined. Among them, odd-numbered types have a tendency to release compressed energy in an active way, whereas even-numbered types are passive and require others' attention to release compressed energy. The 12 types are like pure colours in colour, and there is a combination of two types in one person (this is called complex Taiheki).

The concept of Taiheki is somehow similar to the typology by Ernst Kretschmer, Enneagram of Personality and Four Temperaments. However, Taiheki is not only applicable to psychological aspects such as one's emotional or behavioural tendencies, but also to one's physical characteristics including the shape of face and body, balance of weights, and tendency seen in movement. According to him, all these aspects are correlated with the state of five lumbar vertebrae. In Japanese, tai (体) means "body", whereas heki (癖) represents "habit" or "tendency". Noguchi established the concept of Taiheki through his activity as a healer and Seitai teacher sometime during the early 1950s.

A modified weight scale called Tairyo Haibun Kei (体量配分計) (body mass distribution meter) is used to tell somebody's Taiheki. The scale's platform is divided into left and right parts for both legs, and each of the parts is further divided into three parts: frontal right, frontal left, and rear parts. Thus one stands over the six parts of the platform. When he makes postures, such as brace and forward-bending position, the scale gives data on the biased balance of his weight in a certain direction for each posture. According to Noguchi, each Taiheki has a distinct tendency to the biased balance of weight in each posture. One can hence determine somebody's Taiheki based on the collected data.

Alternatively, without using any special apparatus, one's Taiheki can be estimated by observation of his/her physical constitution, postural characteristics, kinetic features, or psychological tendency in sensitivity .

Noguchi's seitai provides exercises specifically designed for each Taiheki, to adjust its unbalanced tendency when it is excessive. It is thought that in general one's Taiheki doesn't change dramatically in adulthood. Noguchi himself was Taiheki type 9 mixed with twisted type, whereas his wife, Akiko Noguchi was Taiheki type 1.

== 12 types of Taiheki ==
12 types of Taiheki
category	odd-numbered Release-requiring	even-numbered Attention-requiring	key lumbar vertebrate in movement	sensitive to	key organ in sensitivity
Upwards and Downwards (上下型)	type 1 (1種)	type 2 (2種)	L1	Honour-Shame	brain
Leftwards and Rightwards (左右型)	type 3 (3種)	type 4 (4種)	L2	Like-Dislike	digestive systems
Forwards and Backwards (前後型)	type 5 (5種)	type 6 (6種)	L5	Merits-Demerits	respiratory organs
Twisted (捻れ型)	type 7 (7種)	type 8 (8種)	L3	Win-Lose	Urinary organs
Closing and Opening (開閉型)	type 9 (閉型9種)	type 10 (開型10種)	L4	Love-Hate	genitals
Hypersensitive Response (過敏型)	type 11 (11種)			Hypersensitivity	
Sluggish Response (遅鈍型)		type 12 (12種)		Dull sensitivity	

=== Release and Attention - Odd-numbered Taiheki and Even-numbered Taiheki ===
- Odd-numbered Taiheki of 1, 3, 5, 7, 9, and 11 are considered to be the types that can proactively dissipate excess energy.
- Even-numbered Taiheki of 2, 4, 6, 8, 10, and 12 are less likely to dissipate their surplus energy, are more susceptible to their surroundings and desire the attention of others when they lack energy.

=== Classification of the 12 types of Taiheki ===
Taiheki types 1 to 10 are closely related to the kinematic characteristics of a particular lumbar vertebra; types 11 and 12 are somewhat specialised and characterised by an overall acuteness or dullness of sensitivity.

=== Upwards and Downwards category: Types 1 & 2 ===
L1 vertebrate is important in the movement of people having these Taiheki. When they stand upright and bend themselves forward, they often put their weight on the frontal part of their soles. They are underweight and slender, with a long, firm neck, narrow shoulders, thin chest plate and slight muscle tone in the limbs. When they have a posture in which they bend themselves forward slightly, they often bend their neck and above. They have a straight spine. They tend to wear plain and conservative clothes. Type 1 is more comfortable looking up when placing feet on a desk and hands around the neck; Type 2 is more comfortable looking down. They tend to have smaller breasts in women. Right and wrong, praise and blame, are central to their sensitivity. They value reputation and honour. They are good at constructing and telling logic. About their high linguistic ability, they are sensitive to words and highly susceptible to verbal suggestions. Hence, they often become ill or healthy simply due to their assumption or other person's words. They are realistic and interesting in their conversations. They require long sleep and often have a dream about the story. They are very sensitive to lack of sleep and worry a lot about it. Because they persist in good reason, truth, and rules, they cannot take action without having good enough reason for themselves. They tend to overview the world as if from the viewpoint of heaven, and have high metacognitive ability. Thus, Noguchi said that people with the Upwards and Downwards category are the least wild, and like Xian/Sennin/Hsien (in Taoism), Xian is believed to live in a high mountain, or heaven immortal and have some magical power. Noguchi meant that people of these Taiheki live in an imaginary world with an overview of the natural world. They like books and studying from childhood and listen well to adults, so they often honour students. They believe that emotions are below reason and should be controlled by reason, so when they see someone being overwhelmed by emotions, they think it is a pity. They tend to like the colour blue. They are elegant.

==== Type 1 ====
Taiheki type 1 has a strong tendency of cerebral sublimating of surplus energy into the intellectual activity. They turn their energy into thoughts. They are sympathetic and left-brain dominant. They tend to have naturally curly hair. They have long faces and broad foreheads. When they walk, they do not lift their knees high, and their steps are wide. They stretch upwards when surprised. They like to read and are happy to increase their knowledge. They like to know the meaning of words they have never heard before. They like history, philosophy, etc. They come up with many ideas, so they talk in the order in which they come up with them, and the topics change rapidly. They talk without reading between the lines and talk about difficult things. They know a lot, and when you ask them about something, they start with its history and go on and on about it. They do not get angry if you interrupt them. They can answer a question out of the blue and are very good at improvising. They are always calm but blush easily when they are embarrassed. They make up systems and rules and get angry when these are broken. When they look up and give a blank look, they are daydreaming. People with this Taiheki always try to understand the world linguistically. That is to say, they have an intense motivation to understand everything by explaining it in their own words. They have a high capacity for language. They are good at using their minds, speaking and writing. They write well, with sound reasoning and thought. They have a large vocabulary. They like to think about something new actively and can plan things in an orderly way, but, just getting an idea of results during their consideration, they often become satisfied quickly and lose their motivation to do it for real. They say they will do something that they clearly cannot do, and then they do not do it. They are good at seeing and organising things objectively. They love to know theories and mechanisms. They are good at creating new theories from a wealth of information. When they have surplus energy, they tend to ponder more and become less active than usual. When you need to scold a person with Taiheki type 1, Noguchi recommended saying things shortly to encourage his/her thinking. If you give lengthy scolding, they would regard you as stupid. When they listen to music, they are more likely to pay attention to the melody. They can get your jokes. They are good at memorising maps. They usually live long life. They will not go dim if they keep using their brains until they die. They are not so obsessive about eating, and they are not afraid to eat the same thing every day or skip meals. They often dream of flying and are more likely to remember their dreams. They want to be elite, and they want social status. They are authoritarian and value tradition, prestige and history. They tend to measure value in terms of authoritative things such as names, titles, brands, positions, status, education, family history, etc. They are labellers. They are weak in their actual performance. They are great at logic and critiquing, but they are no better when you get them to do it. They are good at getting others to do things. They are sluggish when they see others do it, but even less so when they do it themselves. They are not good at practical use and application, and they get lost in thought. They do not want results. They are insensitive to emotions. They do not care about other people's feelings. They tend to be seduced by esoteric language from others. They are vulnerable to criticism and quickly won over by praise. They value hierarchy, manners and etiquette, pride, dignity and greetings. If someone fails to do so, they frown. They use the words "should" and "must" a lot, and they want to be the ones to tell others what to do. They are stubborn people who have their own opinions and do not change easily, but they will obey orders from the absolute top. They do not listen to the opinions of those whom they regard as inferior in position or intelligence. It is said that most men have Taiheki type 1 to some extent, and many characteristics accepted to be typical of men can thus be understood as a part of features of Taiheki type 1. They are often academics, professors, politicians, lawyers, managers, administrators, bankers, writers and professional chess players. When fatigued, their necks become tense, T5 (5th thoracic vertebrae) rises and appears strong, and L1 (1st lumbar vertebrae) becomes rigid. They stretch their bodies to relieve fatigue. They will have a contraction of the back of the neck and a raised chin when the tension continues. They start to have pain in the back of their neck. They start to move their neck up and down. They will not feel that they have thought it all through, no matter how much they think about it. When they feel well, they are able to put things into a few words, but this is no longer possible, and their minds are constantly working. They also lose their libido when they are thinking about difficult things. They lose their sense of reality and become buried in the world of abstractions. They lose the ability to understand things that are not directly expressed in words. Their jaws become tense, and their heads become tired.

==== Type 2 ====
Taiheki type 2 has a habitual tendency to sublimation the diencephalon, hypersensitivity of the diencephalon, and cerebral tension that easily evokes physical changes. They are parasympathetic dominance and right-brain dominance. They often have a precipitous back of the head and prominent cheekbones on the face. They have a neck shaped like a mountain ridge when viewed from the front, and when viewed from the side, their neck extends forward like a showerhead. They have no strength in their necks. They walk with slightly outstretched legs and bent knees. They look down when they think. When they are stuck in thinking, that is soon reflected by physical problems, such as stomachache. They feel difficulty taking action under their responsibility and decision, while they feel at ease when taking action according to opinions of, or under the responsibility of, others. They are passive and mindful of what others think. They are relieved when people tell them what to do. They are comfortable doing the same things as others. They are not outspoken. They are cautious and reserved. They are receptive to gossip and written material, and once they are in, they are challenging to correct. They are very presumptive. They excel at paperwork but may only work according to manuals. They follow the rules and instructions to the letter and have a strong desire for recognition and approval for following them. They are polite, regular, serious, disciplined, and work for the good of the world. They are accurate in their work. They are sensible, and they behave in a way that is not embarrassing to the world and attracts praise. They think that their common sense is the right one. They are ashamed to be selfish or to show themselves. They listen well to their parents, teachers and superiors. They are faithful to the basics, to duty, and obedient. They can be powerful when they follow the norms and the path. They are brilliant, hard-working people who can do what they have planned. They are diligent and erudite. They are highly analytical and able to process information. They are intelligent. They prepare carefully and simulate different cases. They are good at imitating and passing on. They pay attention to their subordinates and others under them. They cannot say anything that others do not like. They cannot refuse a request. They are relaxed and amicable among their people, but outside they hide their true intentions and are sober and do not speak their minds. They may prefer a simple life. They do not live a glamorous life, even when they are successful. They draw their communication from a manual in their brain that says, "If you say this, I will say that." They are more comfortable working in a seniority-based system than a performance-based or merit-based system. They are good at connecting people with other people. They understand the characteristics of people and can keep a reasonable distance. They listen to people fairly. They are good at long-distance running in athletics. They can speak well if they are prepared in advance but feel uncomfortable without a script. They are not good at improvisation. They are less likely to move quickly in a crisis. They are the best sycophants in the world. They tend to be sneaky. They are not good at originality or resourcefulness or at making unprecedented decisions. They are slow to make decisions about new things. They can be cynical in adolescence and delight in confusing others. They like thinking, but they are more imaginative than verbal, and often get stuck when trying to understand things with their own words. They are constantly sorting things out in their heads. They have no conclusions. They are good at remembering exactly what others have thought. They tend to feel busy and anxious about things that come from outside and are often busy thinking about and dealing with this and that. They tend to have a sweet tooth. They are also the most attached to their families. They are delusional, fanciful and have a limitless imagination. They get more and more anxious when bad fantasies start and get caught up in the negative thoughts that go around in their head. When they think about the future, they always struggle with vicious delusions in their heads. They are good at making up stories because they are good at imagining things. They can quickly let their thoughts show on their faces. They forget that they even had such feelings about things they used to hate. They do not talk about themselves much and try to be harmless. They are more receptive to Confucian values. They value ethics and morality. They seek order and stability. They are conservative and do not like new ideas. They do not want to cause trouble, are sensitive to shame, do not want to be laughed at, and necessary not to make mistakes. They think that all that matters is that things go well. They like history, drawing, cosplay, etc. They like to get into a story and become the main character in it to feel as if they have experienced it. They can have a strong sense of realism in a fictional world. They tend to dream of falling into a hole. They can think that the best thing to do is graduate from a good university, join a good company and work steadily. They lose their appetite when people say dirty words to them. They are among the most likely to work for a company and become emotionally ill. They read the other person's words too deeply, and as a result, they sometimes hate the other person. They are vulnerable to strong emotions from others. They are often bureaucrats, prosecutors, accountants, bankers, booksellers, curators, announcers, salespeople, assistants, secretaries, store clerks, messengers, actors, and cartoonists. When fatigued, their cerebral reflexes become hyperactive. Their neck relaxes and the pubic bone begins to protrude. Their anterior rib drops and their T5 (5th thoracic vertebra) drops. Their L5 (5th lumbar vertebra) becomes rigid. The Sternocleidomastoid muscle on the side of the neck becomes painful when they are tired. They become tenser in the vagus nerve, more prone to gastric hyperacidity, or more often to tension in the temples and frontal region. They will want to put their feet up on the chair. Their cheeks become hollow and their necks stiff. They lose the ability to distinguish between essential and minor matters and feel that everything is important. They start to try to please everyone and make strange compromises. They become nauseous. Their stomach is affected, and they end up with stomach ulcers.

=== Leftwards and Rightwards category: Types 3 & 4 ===
In maintaining balance at the second lumbar vertebra, physiological preferences and aversions play a central role in their sensitivity. Consequently, the individual's weight tends to shift significantly towards either the left or right foot, causing the sole of one shoe to wear down more easily. Characterized by a spatial sense centered around the digestive system, individuals with this trait possess a diminished sense of opposition towards space, allowing them to excel in tender communication. This is similar to the effects observed in ordinary people who dine together to alleviate tension.

==== Type 3 ====
Taiheki Type 3 individuals have a robust gastrointestinal system, an insatiable appetite, and a penchant for cooking. Even when they catch a cold, their appetite remains unaffected. They tend to eat heartily, whether they are psychologically uplifted or downcast, to the point where it is said that their "appetite walks on its own." They eat well in both happy and sad times. Rich in emotional expression and possessing a warm demeanor, these individuals excel in interpersonal relationships, though they tend to struggle with tidying up.

They have good memory retention (even without understanding), but display a tendency to focus on specific details while forgetting others. With a keen sense of color, they pay particular attention to the tone when listening to music.

They are generally weak in logical reasoning and are inclined to make judgments based solely on their preferences or aversions. This contrasts with Type 1 individuals, who seek to explain everything logically. Interestingly, the compatibility between Type 1 and Type 3 individuals is considered to be exceptional, as they are unable to comprehend each other's perspectives.

Type 3 individuals tend to readily accept the words of authoritative figures and display a strong inclination towards trends and brand consciousness. They often have a soft and round facial appearance and body type, with slender waists and a high proportion of fair-skinned beauties. One could argue that they possess a demeanor that requires protection and have learned how to act in a spoiled manner.

There can be considerable differences in the impressions given by men and women with this trait, with men exhibiting a more carefree attitude. When reprimanded, they tend to respond more to the tone of voice and emotions of the person scolding them than to the content of the reprimand, making it difficult for lectures to resonate. Many women are believed to possess elements of Type 3 traits to varying degrees, and many characteristics discussed as unique to female sensitivity and thought patterns are considered to be features of Type 3 traits.

==== Type 4 ====
Taiheki Type 4 individuals are emotional yet tend to be introverted. Their emotions arise rapidly but do not last long, leading to instances where they may be angry one moment and laughing the next. They often appear to be smiling vaguely, which can make it difficult to discern their true emotions. Negative emotions may not surface but can linger internally, affecting their physiological state and causing them to experience periodic diarrhea to maintain balance. Unlike Type 3 individuals, their appetite decreases when they become excited, tense, or fatigued.

Typically slender and bony, Type 4 individuals have a thin body when looked from the side and frequently exhibit a straight-backed posture with the shoulders somewhat raised and tense, making them look hunched. They have difficulty gaining weight. They possess a strong fashion sense and place importance on maintaining a clean appearance. They tend to exhibit masochistic tendencies, finding catharsis in watching tear-jerking movies and crying along or feeling relief when scolded or spoken to directly by others. Their overall movements tend to be linear and rigid.

=== Forwards and Backwards category: Types 5 & 6 ===
They maintain balance at the fifth lumbar vertebra, with their sensitivity centered on gains and losses. When standing upright, their weight is distributed toward the front of their feet; however, when bowing, their weight shifts toward the back as their buttocks protrude. They are rational and skilled in cost-benefit analysis. Their shoulders are characteristic, often assuming a forward-leaning posture. This posture can be seen as a constant awareness of the next step, associated with a sense of tension along the time axis. It has been pointed out that many individuals from the baby boomer generation in Japan have a hard time staying still, exhibiting this anterior-posterior posture.

==== Type 5 ====
Taiheki Type 5 individuals are action-oriented rationalists and sportsperson types, with wide-shouldered, V-shaped torsos. Their respiratory systems are robust. They tend to prefer multitasking while studying or working, and have a penchant for drawing attention to themselves, gathering people and engaging in lively interactions. They prefer thinking while in motion, as staying still can make them feel tired and hinder their mental functioning. They often adopt a posture with their chest puffed out and their back arched.

Due to their excessive effort, they may inadvertently come across as pretentious or arrogant when others are watching. When they have excess energy, they can dissipate it through frivolous spending, impulsive purchases, or engaging in adventures. Their extreme rationality can sometimes give off a cold impression. They possess a strong desire for ownership, but their interest wanes once they acquire an item. They tend to be more active when burdened with debt or anxiety, while contentment can lead to laziness. In music, they are more likely to be drawn to tempo and rhythm.

==== Type 6 ====
Taiheki Type 6 individuals tend to have sensitive or weak respiratory systems, often exhibiting postures with their chins jutting forward or shoulders protruding. They may quickly become short of breath. Many have pointed chins or receding lower jaws, and they often display prominent whites of their eyes on three sides of the iris (left, right, and below). Like Type 5 individuals, they want to take action, but the more conscious they become, the more tension they hold in their shoulders, which prevents them from acting as they would like (unlike Type 5, who can act when their shoulders are tense). They are prone to melancholy and prefer to express themselves with passionate words. On the other hand, when they are unconsciously relaxed and their shoulders are not tense, they can effortlessly take action.

They favor new environments, thriving in extraordinary situations, events, or during changes like moving or changing jobs. In chaotic situations that might fluster others, they can remain calm and act decisively. They are romantic at heart and may occasionally engage in self-destructive or martyr-like behaviors. However, their somewhat limited drive necessitates the support of others to achieve their goals. Unlike Type 5 individuals, who enjoy socializing, Type 6 individuals prefer solitude. However, since they require assistance in various aspects of life, they rarely become isolated. They have a strong desire for focused attention and may unconsciously cause hysteria or suffer health issues to attract the concern of others, but they can recover quickly once their needs are acknowledged. They struggle to study even when small noises are present.

Although they eat well, their appetite often stems from anxiety about not being able to sustain themselves without food, rather than a genuine desire to eat. In this regard, they differ from Type 3 individuals. It has been suggested that the current era of rapid progress and information overload is more adaptable for Type 6 individuals, leading to an increase in their numbers.

=== Twisted category: Types 7 & 8 ===
Characterized by twisting movements centered around the third lumbar vertebra, the competitive nature of winning and losing is at the heart of their sensitivity. Their body weight distribution is twisted; if the left foot bears weight towards the front, the right foot bears weight towards the back[1]. They find it easy to twist their spine. They possess a competitive, relentless nature and are constantly engaged in contests with others (although they dislike being compared to others). When writing, they cannot write straight and either write with their body turned or the paper angled[4]. People who sit diagonally at desks or on chairs are likely to have a twisted taiheki. They have a contrarian nature, unconsciously resisting what others tell them. Provoked by paradoxical statements, such as "I want you to do this, but I guess it's impossible for you," they become rebellious, eventually complying with the request[1]. When their energy becomes stagnant, they tend to engage in impulsive actions without considering the consequences. It is noted that martial artists and fighters overwhelmingly exhibit this body habit[14]. In relation to the twisting movements of their body, fatigue tends to affect their kidneys, making them less prone to sweating, sensitive to humidity, or experiencing sudden urges to urinate[10].

==== Type 7 ====
Taiheki Type 7 individuals are solidly built warrior types, constantly seeking challenges and openly competing with others. They are not satisfied without a sense of tension and tend to speak and act excessively[12]. They are skilled at twisting their upper body[3]. They boast to those weaker than themselves but bow to those stronger[1]. They have a personality suitable for leadership and cherish the importance of loyalty and strong human bonds.[3]. They dislike admitting defeat or fault and are averse to apologizing[3], often continuing to play games like cards until they win[3]. They tend to forget the dreams they have had[1]. When teaching them something, they do not understand the imaginative approach of saying, "If you do that, you'll fail" (which is effective for the upwards-downwards category) and will resist; it is better to let them try and then teach them by saying, "See, it didn't work"[1]. They prefer a reward-and-punishment-based teaching method, where they receive something if they succeed and nothing if they fail[1]. As they often have resonant voices, they are frequently singers. Their limbs are muscular, and their ankles are thick[10]. They are particularly aggressive towards Type 2 individuals but tend to be skillfully manipulated and used by Type 9 individuals[12]. In music, they tend to focus on the dynamics (volume) of the sound.

==== Type 8 ====
Taiheki Type 8 individuals are also combative but differ from Type 7 as they tend to be more passive. Although not easily perceived externally, they secretly harbor a competitive spirit against their rivals. Consequently, by comparing themselves with others, they demonstrate unparalleled power. However, comparing themselves with colleagues may lead to resentment; therefore, it is advised to compare them with historical figures[1]. They are proficient in twisting movements involving the lower body[3]. They tend to exaggerate stories, making them increasingly grandiose[1]. They are resistant to unclean and harsh environments[12]. They possess a strong ability to endure adversity and display a volunteer spirit, willing to persistently tackle tasks that ordinary people cannot or would avoid[3][8]. However, they cannot genuinely rejoice when praised[10]. Many are attracted to unconventional things[10]. They have a strong sense of justice and empathy, easily drawn to losers, the weak, and hopeless individuals[3][12]. They rarely use flattery or jokes[3][12]. Their ability to expel water is weak, leading to a tendency for swelling and either difficulty in sweating or excessive sweating[12]. Their buttocks tend to have more volume than their limbs[12][8].

=== Closing and Opening category: Types 9 & 10 ===
They balance chiefly with Type 4 lumbar vertebra. Emotions of love and hate are centered on their sensitivity. They enjoy taking care of others but dislike being taken care of themselves. This type exhibits primitive and intuitive qualities.

==== Type 9 ====
Closing Taiheki Type 9 individuals are perfectionists and can generate ingenious ideas. They are tenacious and tend to hold grudges for a long time, as exemplified by the phrase "100-year-old grudge"[1]. They will not act on instructions from others unless they fully understand and agree with the reasoning behind them[1]. When faced with continuous disagreement, their emotions become introverted and accumulate, eventually leading to an explosive release of pent-up energy[1]. They also tend to fear completing work due to an excessive focus on perfection[5]. They have a strong attachment to their interests and can repeatedly engage in activities they enjoy without becoming bored (the phrase "all or nothing" is fitting for Type 9 individuals)[1]. They possess a keen intuition and attention to detail, often becoming strict leaders. On the other hand, they cannot ignore requests for help from others[12] and may even become overly intrusive[10]. They clearly distinguish between friends and enemies on their own accord. They have strong and enduring concentration[1] and an intense sense of spatial tension[8]. This body type is common among otaku, followed by Type 1[12]. They require little sleep and have a rapid tempo of movement. Unlike Type 10 individuals, they enjoy taking care of their close ones. They are adept at squatting with their heels on the ground and find that their mind works best in this position, leading many to prefer spending a long time in Japanese-style toilets[1]. They enjoy being in the corners of rooms[12]. When listening to music, they pay attention to the silence between the notes and offbeats[1][8]. They have a narrow head width, short and knock-kneed shins, thick chest, and narrow, thick pelvis[10]. They have a slim build.

==== Type 10 ====
Opening Taiheki Type 10 individuals tend to have a boss-like demeanor and possess an attractive, charismatic quality. They enjoy giving presents and are generous. They are extremely caring, not only toward humans but also toward animals such as cats, often taking in and raising strays[5] (conversely, they become stagnant if there is no one to care for, and their energy is replenished when they care for others even when they themselves are unwell)[1]. However, they tend to be indifferent toward their close ones. In contrast to the strict Type 9, Type 10 individuals are tolerant. They are good listeners but highly forgetful[1]. They often gain weight after childbirth, and their buttocks appear large when viewed from behind but flat when viewed from the side[1]. Their body weight is distributed to the outer and rear sides of both legs, but shifts to the inner side when squatting[1]. Their pelvis is in a relaxed state with the iliac bones spread apart[1]. Their movements are leisurely in tempo. They are unable to squat with their heels on the ground with their legs at the width of their iliac bones and tend to fall backward[1]. They prefer to be in the center of a room or social circle, drawing attention to themselves[12][8]. When stressed, they attempt to release tension by engaging in lengthy conversations[1]. They are fond of practicing and training in disciplines that have no ultimate limits, such as "sado", "shodo", and "kendo"[10].

=== Quick-Slow category: Type 11 and Type 12 ===
In contrast to Types 1 to 10, which are characterized by distinct tendencies, the quick-slow category focuses on the sensitivity and speed of bodily reactions, with the extremely sensitive type and the slow types being referred to as Type 11 and Type 12 taiheki, respectively.

==== Type 11, hypersensitive response type ====
Hypersensitive Taiheki Type 11 individuals have highly sensitive bodily reactions. They can easily fall ill from minor issues, although they are less likely to contract severe illnesses[12]. Their body weight distribution is not consistent and changes each time it is measured[1]. They have a high degree of resonance with others, making it easy for them to perceive others' mental states and physical conditions[12][10]. They are indecisive and have difficulty saying no when asked for help[12]. They often find themselves approached by strangers for conversation or lectured by others[12]. If one were to draw a comparison, many people with this type have a cat-like personality.

=== Type 12, sluggish response type ===
Slow Taeheki Type 12 individuals have slow bodily reactions. They are less prone to illness, but this does not mean they can be complacent; they often suddenly develop severe illnesses. Their body weight distribution remains constant, producing the same results even after many years[1].

== See also ==
- Cold reading
- Personality psychology
- Stereotype
- Subconscious
- Temperament
