= Uoshima, Ehime =

Dissolved municipality in Ochi district, Ehime prefecture, Japan

Uoshima (魚島村, Uoshima-mura) was a village located on an Island of the same name in Ochi District, Ehime Prefecture, Japan.

As of 2003, the village had an estimated population of 285 and a density of 89.91 persons per km^{2}. The total area was 3.17 km^{2}.

On October 1, 2004, Uoshima, along with the town of Yuge, and the villages of Ikina and Iwagi (all from Ochi District), was merged to create the town of Kamijima and no longer exists as an independent municipality.

The island that Uoshima village was located on is part of the Geiyo Islands, a group of islands in the Seto Inland Sea.
