= Imafuji Chōtatsurō =

Imafuji Chōtatsurō 今藤長龍郎
- Born: 1969 (age 56–57)
- Origin: Tokyo, Japan
- Genres: Nagauta
- Occupations: Musician, songwriter, educator
- Instrument: Shamisen
- Years active: 1980–present
- Member of: the Tricycle

Imafuji Chōtatsurō (今藤長龍郎) (born 1969) is a Japanese shamisen player in the nagauta tradition. He is classically trained as an accompanist to kabuki chanters, but performs in a number of related styles as well, such as buyō (traditional Japanese dance). He is a part-time lecturer at Kunitachi College of Music, heads the shamisen section of the Tricycle performance troupe of which he is a founding member, and is involved in a number of other organizations and projects which aim to keep Japan's traditional performing arts alive and to pass them on to the next generations.

The son of Hisayuki Imafuji, Chōtatsurō is part of a long and prestigious lineage of nagauta artists. He is the nephew of Tōsha Meishō and Yoshio Nakagawa, and is also related to Tōsha Shūhō of the Tōsha school of traditional musicians.

== Biography ==
Born in Tokyo in 1969, he first began learning the piano at the age of four. He began studying under Imafuji Ryōko at the age of ten, and made his stage debut the following year, in 1980. In 1985, he was granted the name Chōtatsurō by Imafuji Chōjūrō, and attended university at the Tokyo National University of Fine Arts and Music. Upon his graduation in 1991, he began to study formally under his uncle Tōsha Meishō and his father. The same year, he appeared on NHK programs on both traditional Japanese and Western music, as well as performing at the National Theater and Kabuki-za.

Chōtatsurō does not regularly perform at the mainstream kabuki theaters, generally being involved in projects more related directly to music and dance than to theatre. However, he has performed at the Kabuki-za, and has worked with the great kabuki actors Nakamura Kantarō II, Nakamura Shichinosuke II, and Nakamura Shidō II among others. He performed at the 2004 Summer Olympics in Athens, and has made tours to England twice, in 2005 and 2007. In 2005, he was presented with the Award of the Foundation for the Development of Traditional Japanese Culture. Today he continues to teach both at Kunitachi College of Music and more privately, is a member of a league of composers of new works in the traditional style, and is involved in a number of other projects that encourage and support the traditional arts.
