= Izumi (disambiguation) =

Izumi is both a Japanese given name and a surname. It may also refer to:

== Places in Japan ==
- Izumi, Osaka, a city on the island of Honshu
- Izumi, Kagoshima, a city on the island of Kyushu
- Izumi (和泉), a suburb in the Suginami ward of Tokyo
- Izumi, Kumamoto, a village located in Yatsuhiro District
- Izumi-ku, Sendai, the northernmost ward of Sendai

=== Former entities ===
- Izumi Province, a former province whose area now makes up the southwestern part of Osaka Prefecture
- Izumi Domain, a feudal domain under the Tokugawa shogunate of the Edo period, located in southern Mutsu Province

== See also ==
- 6089 Izumi, asteroid
- Izumi Todo, collective pseudonym of the staff of Toei Animation
- Japanese cruiser Izumi, warship formerly named Esmeralda
