= Zensei =

Publishing company based in Tokyo, Japan

Zensei is a publishing company based in Tokyo, Japan, and specialises in books on Seitai.
