= Konsen-ji (Itano) =

Temple in Tokushima Prefecture, Japan

Coordinates: 34°8′50.77″N 134°28′6.76″E

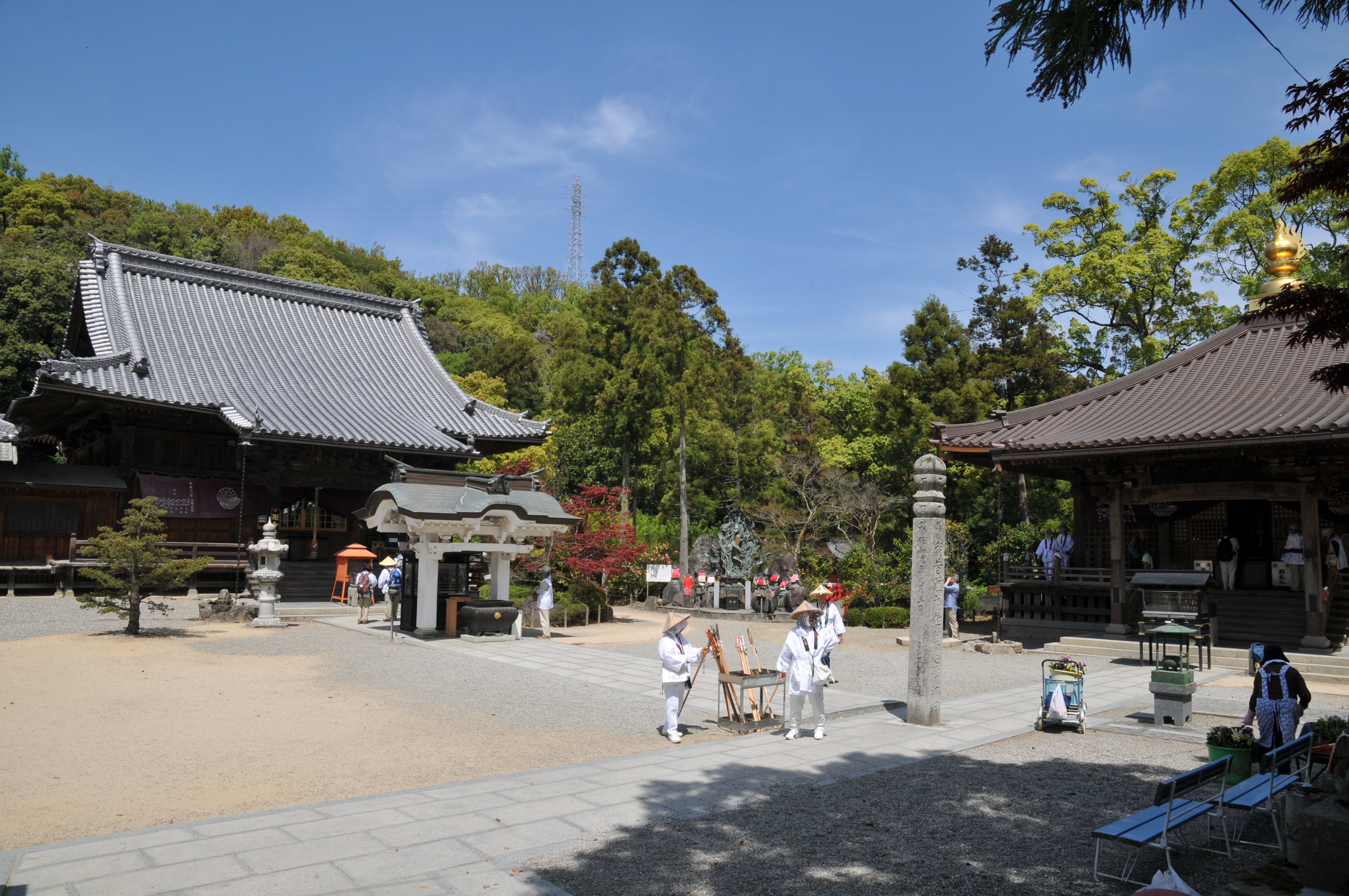
Konsen-ji

Konsen-ji (金泉寺) is a Kōya-san Shingon temple in Itano, Tokushima Prefecture, Japan. Temple 3 on the Shikoku 88 temple pilgrimage, the main image is of Shaka Nyorai. Said to have been founded by Gyōki, it was rebuilt in the Edo period after being burned by the Chōsokabe.

== See also ==
- Shikoku 88 temple pilgrimage
