= Izumo =

Izumo (出雲) may refer to:

== Locations ==
- Izumo Province, an old province of Japan
- Izumo, Shimane, a city located in Shimane Prefecture
  - Izumo Airport
- Izumo-taisha, one of Japan's most ancient and important Shinto shrines

== Ships ==
- Izumo-class multi-purpose destroyer, a class of multi-purpose operation destroyer operated by the Japan Maritime Self-Defense Force
  - JS Izumo, lead ship of this class
- Japanese cruiser Izumo, an armored cruiser operated by the Imperial Japanese Navy

== Fiction ==
- SDF-4 Izumo, a spaceship in the Robotech universe
- Izumo: Takeki Tsurugi no Senki, an anime series
- Kunisaki Izumo no Jijō, a Japanese manga series
- Izumo Kamurogi, the commander of Altair forces in the anime series Aquarion Evol
- Daisuke Izumo, the main character in the anime series Ninja Captor

== Other ==
- Izumo (train), a former train service in Japan
- Sunrise Izumo, a train service in Japan
- IZUMO1, a sperm-specific protein necessary for sperm-egg plasma membrane binding and fusion.
