= Itsuo Tsuda =

Japanese philosopher and aikido practitioner

- Born: 3 May 1914; Korea
- Died: 10 March 1984; Paris, France
- Occupations: Aikido teacher and philosopher

Itsuo Tsuda (津田 逸夫, Tsuda Itsuo; 3 May 1914 – 10 March 1984) was a Japanese philosopher and a practitioner and teacher of aikido and Seitai.

Tsuda was born in Japanese-ruled Korea. When he was 16 years old, he defied his father, who wished for his eldest son to remain home and manage his family's estate. He left his family home and begin wandering, searching for new philosophies that would free his mind.

Having reconciled with his father, in 1934 he went to France, where he studied with Marcel Granet and Marcel Mauss until 1940, when he went back Japan: he studied Noh with Hosada, Seitai with Haruchika Noguchi and aikido with Morihei Ueshiba.

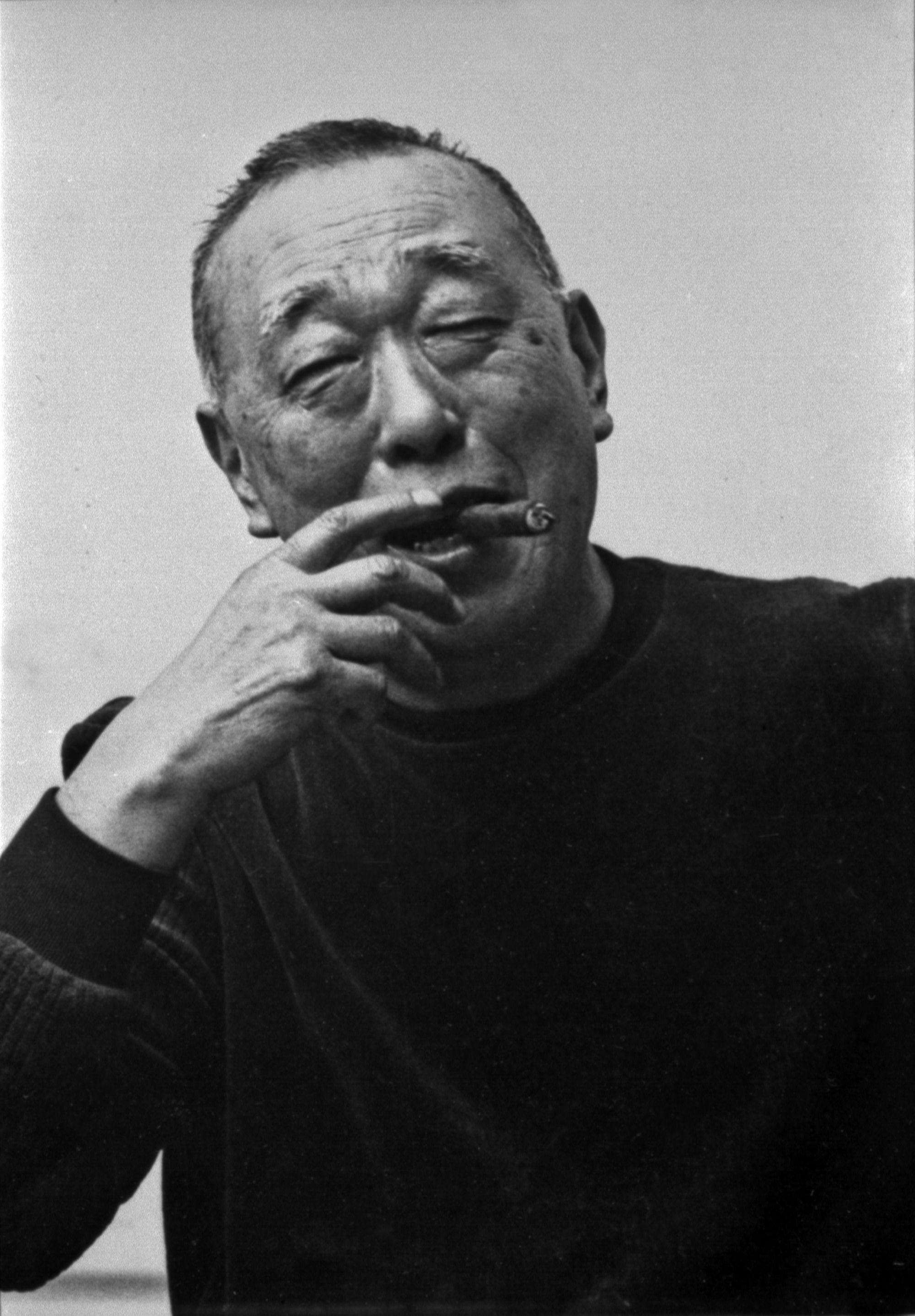
Portrait of Itsuo Tsuda

In 1970 Itsuo Tsuda came back to Europe to disseminate the regenerative movement (or katsugen undō 活元運動, かつげんうんどう, a basic Seitai practice) and his ideas on Ki. In 1973 he published his first book, "Le Non-Faire" while waiting to open his first dōjō, in Paris, L'Ecole de la Respiration (also the title of his series of books).

He died in Paris in 1984, but his practical philosophy is left in his work and his books and taught in several European "School of Breathing" dōjōs.

== Bibliography ==
All books available from Guy Trédaniel Editeur

1. Le Non Faire (1973)
2. La Voie du Dépouillement (1975)
3. La Science du Particulier (1976)
4. Un (1978)
5. Le Dialogue du Silence (1979)
6. Le Triangle Instable (1980)
7. Même si je ne pense pas, je suis (1981)
8. La Voie des Dieux (1982)
9. Face à la Science (1983)
10. Coeur de ciel pur(2015)
1. The Not Doing (1984, English translation of vol. 1 ISBN 2-88063-007-X)
2. The Non Doing (2014, New English translation of vol. 1) book available from Yume Editions
3. The Path of Less (2014, English translation of vol. 2) book available from Yume Editions
4. The Science of the Particular (2015, English translation of vol. 3) book available from Yume Editions
5. One (2017, English translation of vol. 4) book available from Yume Editions
6. The Dialogue of silence (2018, English translation of vol. 5) book available from Yume Editions
7. The unstable triangle (2019, English translation of vol. 6) book available from Yume Editions
