= Itano, Tokushima =

Itano 板野町
- Town
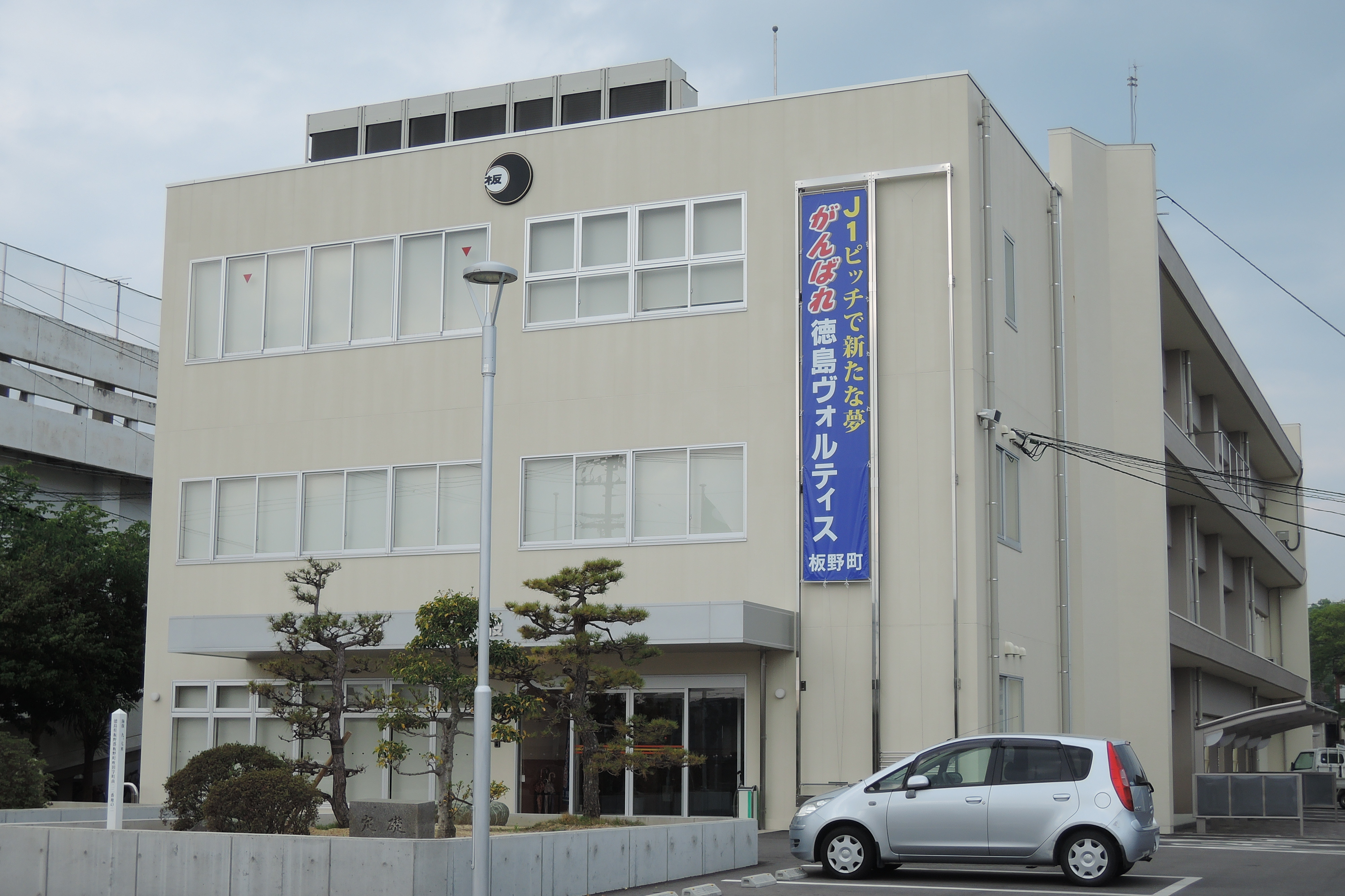
- Itano Town Hall

- Flag Emblem
- Interactive map of Itano
- Location in Japan
- Coordinates: 34°8′39.7″N 134°27′45.4″E
- Country: Japan
- Region: Shikoku
- Prefecture: Tokushima
- District: Itano

Area
  - Total: 36.22 km^{2} (13.98 sq mi)

Population (June 30, 2022)
  - Total: 13,105
  - Density: 361.8/km^{2} (937.1/sq mi)
- Time zone: UTC+09:00 (JST)
- City hall address: 22-2 Minami, Suita-cho, Itano-cho, Itano-gun, Tokushima-ken 779-0104
- Website: Official website
- Symbols
- Flower: Sakura
- Tree: Pieris japonica

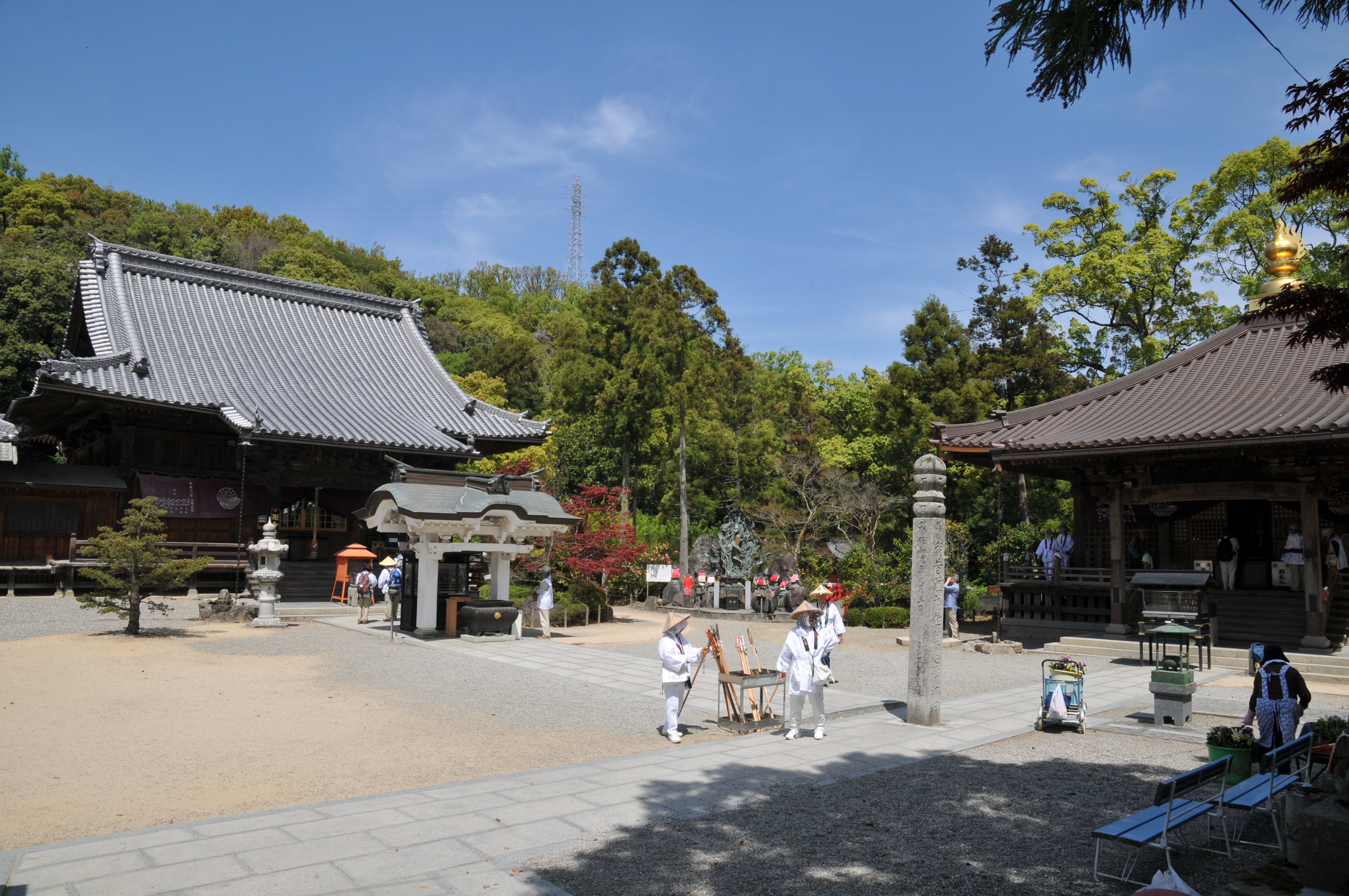
Konsen-ji

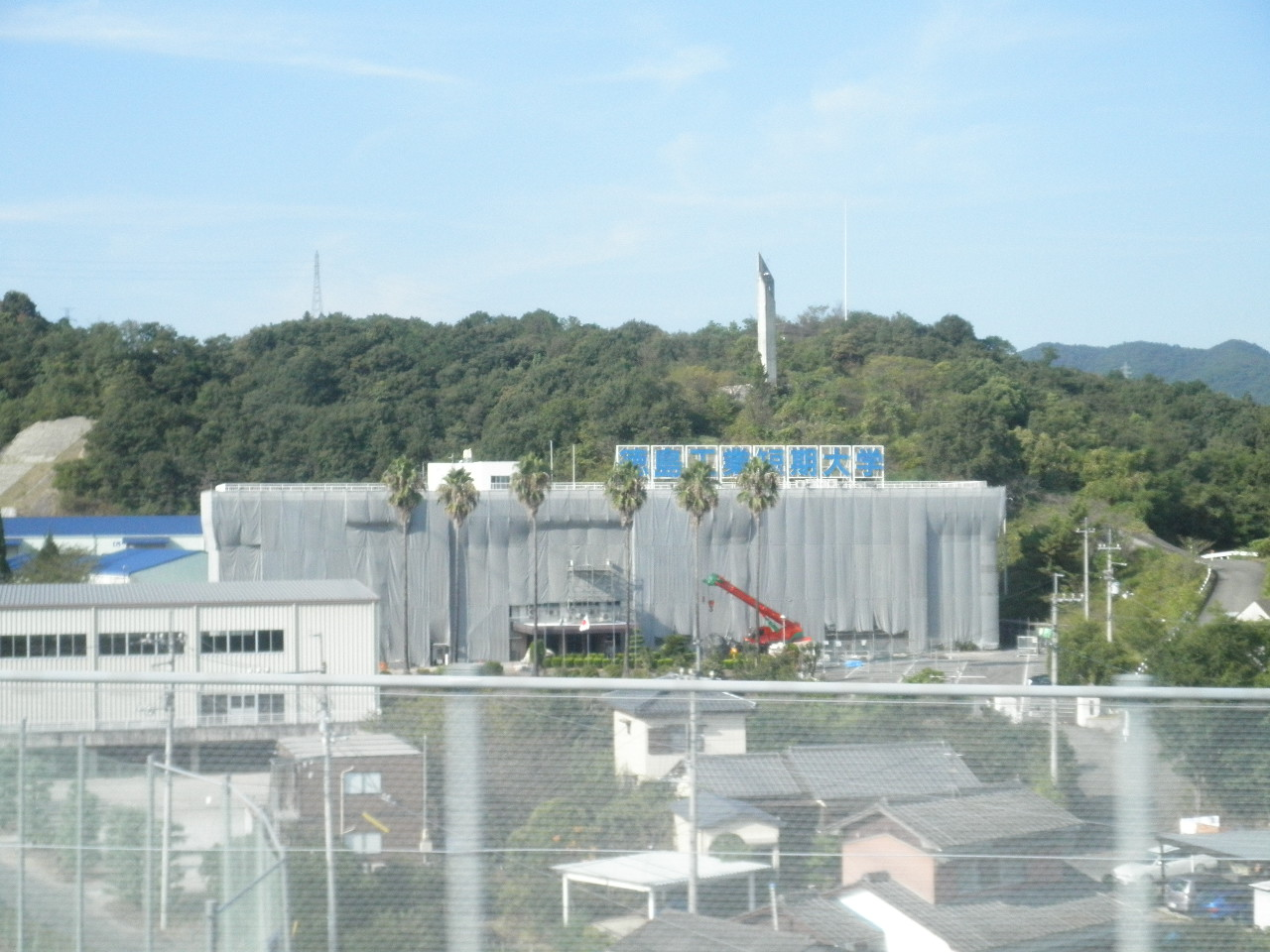
Tokushima College of Technology

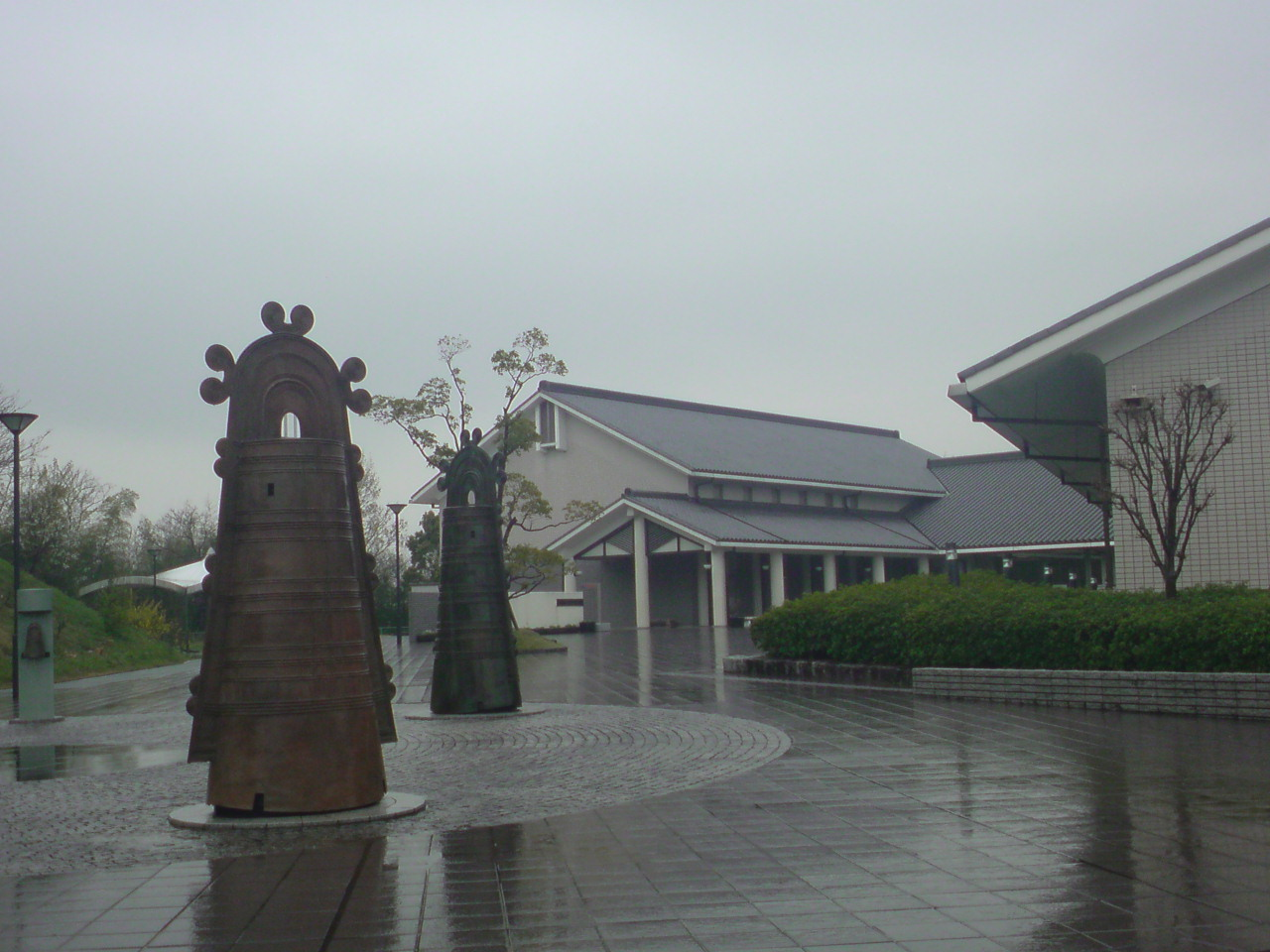
Itano Archaeological Museum

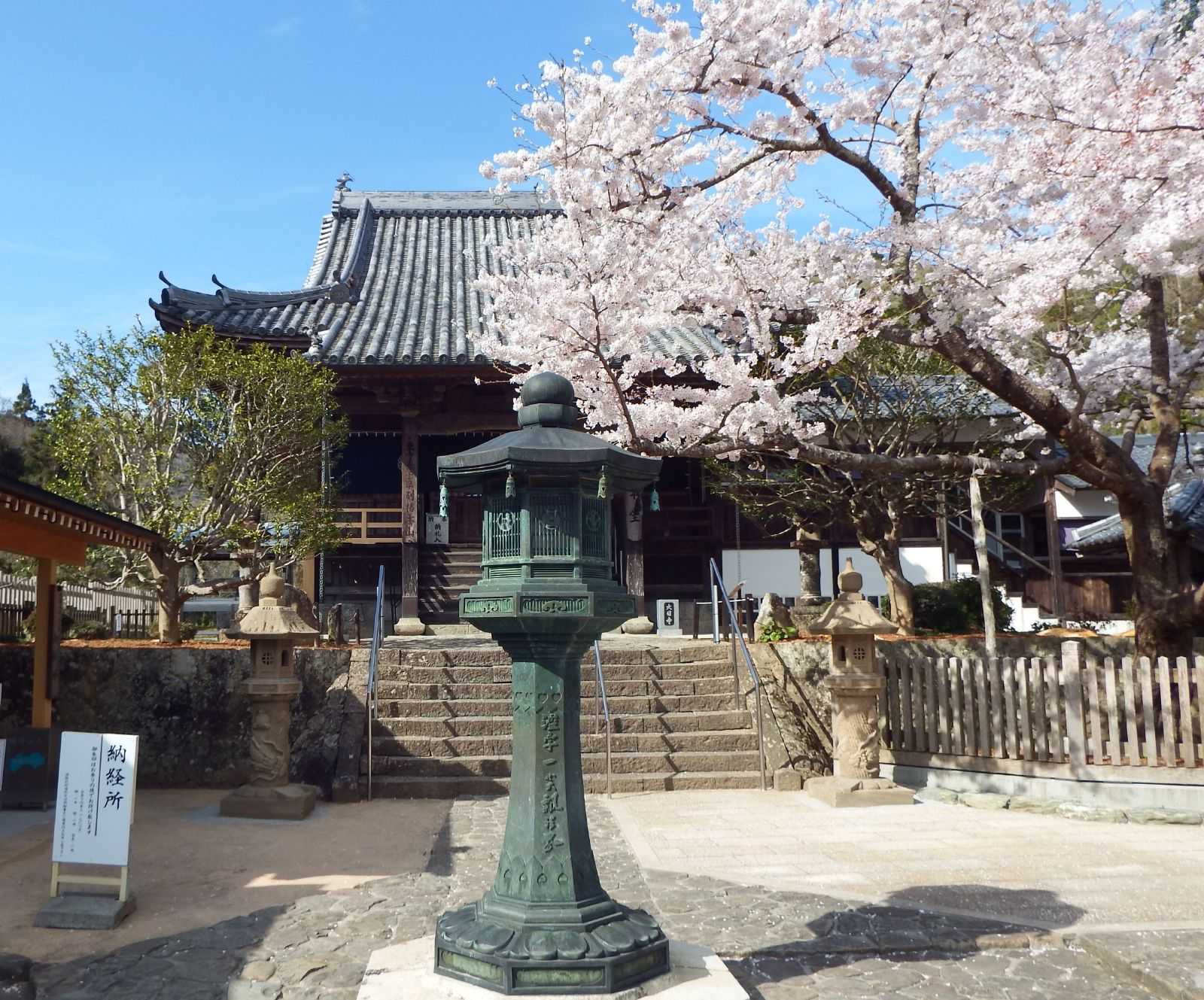
Dainichi-ji

Itano (板野町, Itano-chō) is a town located in Itano District, Tokushima Prefecture, Japan. As of 30 June 2022, the town had an estimated population of 13,105 in 5,790 households and a population density of 360 persons per km^{2}. The total area of the town is 36.22 square kilometres (13.98 sq mi).

== Geography ==
Itano is located in northeastern Tokushima Prefecture on the island of Shikoku. The northern part of the town is occupied by the Sanuki Mountains, and the southern part is the delta area of the Yoshino River. The Japan Median Tectonic Line fault zone, which is an active fault, runs from east to west at the boundary between the mountains and the plains.

=== Neighbouring municipalities ===
Kagawa Prefecture

- Higashikagawa

Tokushima Prefecture

- Aizumi
- Kamiita
- Naruto

== Climate ==
Itano has a humid subtropical climate (Köppen Cfa) characterized by warm summers and cool winters with light snowfall. The average annual temperature in Itano is 15.9 °C. The average annual rainfall is 1637 mm with September as the wettest month. The temperatures are highest on average in August, at around 26.7 °C, and lowest in January, at around 5.7 °C.

== Demographics ==
Per Japanese census data, the population of Itano has remained relatively stable for the past 60 years.

Historical population
Year	Pop.	±%
1920	10,835	—
1930	11,685	+7.8%
1940	11,757	+0.6%
1950	15,408	+31.1%
1960	13,976	−9.3%
1970	12,952	−7.3%
1980	13,562	+4.7%
1990	13,785	+1.6%
2000	14,636	+6.2%
2010	14,242	−2.7%

== History ==
As with all of Tokushima Prefecture, the area of Itano was part of ancient Awa Province. The village of Itanishi (板西村) was established within Itano District, Tokushima with the creation of the modern municipalities system on October 1, 1889. It was raised to town status on July 29, 1908. Itanishi merged with neighboring villages of Matsusaka and Sakae on February 11, 1911, and was renamed Itano.

== Government ==
Itano has a mayor-council form of government with a directly elected mayor and a unicameral town council of 13 members. Itano, together with the other municipalities of Itano District, contributes four members to the Tokushima Prefectural Assembly. In terms of national politics, the town is part of Tokushima 2nd district of the lower house of the Diet of Japan.

== Economy ==
Itano has primarily an agricultural economy, with rice and carrots as the main crops.

== Education ==
Itano has three public elementary schools and one public middle schools operated by the town government and one public high school operated by the Tokushima Prefectural Department of Education. The Tokushima College of Technology is located in Itano.

== Transportation ==
=== Railway ===
Shikoku Railway Company – Kōtoku Line

- Awa-Kawabata - Itano - Awa-Ōmiya

=== Highways ===
- Takamatsu Expressway

== Local attractions ==
- Dainichi-ji, 4th temple on the Shikoku Pilgrimage
- Jizō-ji, 5th temple on the Shikoku Pilgrimage
- Konsen-ji, 3rd temple on the Shikoku Pilgrimage
- Tokushima Prefectural Buried Cultural Properties Research Centre

== Noted people from Itano ==
- Angela Aki, singer, songwriter
