= Ikina, Ehime =

Dissolved municipality in Ehime prefecture, Japan

Ikina (生名村, Ikina-mura) was a village located in Ochi District, Ehime Prefecture, Japan.

Ikina's total area was 3.87 km^{2}. As of 2003, the village had an estimated population of 1,982 and a density of 512.14 persons per km^{2}.

On October 1, 2004, Ikina, along with the town of Yuge, and the villages of Iwagi and Uoshima (all from Ochi District), was merged to create the town of Kamijima and no longer exists as an independent municipality.
