= Iwagi, Ehime =

Dissolved municipality in Ochi district, Ehime prefecture, Japan

Coordinates: 34°14′48″N 133°08′51″E

Iwagi (岩城村, Iwagi-mura) was a village located in Ochi District, Ehime Prefecture, Japan.

Iwagi's total area was 11.51 km^{2}. As of 2003, the village had an estimated population of 2,214 and a density of 192.35 persons per km^{2}.

On October 1, 2004, Iwagi, along with the town of Yuge, and the villages of Ikina and Uoshima (all from Ochi District), was merged to create the town of Kamijima. Iwagi no longer exists as an independent municipality, although it remains the unofficial name for the island proper, as the other merged municipalities are on other islands.
