= List of places of scenic beauty of Japan (Tokushima) =

This list is of the places of scenic beauty of Japan located within the Prefecture of Tokushima.

== National Places of Scenic Beauty ==
As of 1 February 2024, four Places have been designated at a national level.

Site	Municipality	Comments	Image	Coordinates	Type	Ref.
Awa Kokubun-ji Gardens 阿波国分寺庭園; Awa Kokubunji teien	Tokushima	provincial temple of Awa Province; Temple 15 on the Shikoku pilgrimage		34°03′20″N 134°28′26″E	1	
Former Tokushima Castle Omote-Goten Gardens 旧徳島城表御殿庭園; Kyū-Tokushima-jō omote-goten teien	Tokushima			34°04′25″N 134°33′22″E	1	
Naruto 鳴門; Naruto	Naruto			34°14′00″N 134°38′18″E	8, 11	
Ōboke-Koboke 大歩危小歩危; Ōboke・Koboke	Miyoshi	also a Natural Monument		33°53′12″N 133°45′38″E		

== Prefectural Places of Scenic Beauty ==
As of 1 January 2023, five Places have been designated at a prefectural level.

Site	Municipality	Comments	Image	Coordinates	Type	Ref.
Mount Tsurugi and its Flora 剣山並びに亜寒帯植物林; Tsurugi-san narabini akantai shokubutsu-rin	Mima, Naka, Miyoshi	also a Prefectural Natural Monument		33°51′13″N 134°05′39″E		
Wajiki Line - Tsurara Kannon 鷲敷ラインおよび氷柱観音; Wajiki-rain oyobi Tsurara Kannon	Naka			33°50′19″N 134°28′59″E		
Minoda-no-Fuchi 美濃田の淵; Minoda-no-fuchi	Higashimiyoshi	also a Prefectural Natural Monument		34°18′33″N 133°59′23″E		
Ganshō-ji Gardens 願勝寺庭園; Ganshōji teien	Mima			34°03′06″N 134°03′35″E		
Tamon-ji Gardens 多聞寺庭園; Tamonji teien	Tsurugi			33°59′11″N 134°01′25″E		

== Municipal Places of Scenic Beauty ==
As of 1 May 2023, fifteen Places have been designated at a municipal level.

Site	Municipality	Comments	Image	Coordinates	Type	Ref.
Keikoku-ji Gardens 桂国寺庭園; Keikokuji teien	Anan			33°54′35″N 134°37′57″E		
Tōrin-ji Gardens 東林寺庭園; Tōrinji teien	Mima			34°04′20″N 134°08′45″E		
Kannon-ji Shoin Gardens 観音寺書院の庭園; Kannonji shoin teien	Tokushima			34°03′41″N 134°32′42″E		
Iwado Jinja Potholes 岩戸神社甌穴; Iwado Jinja ōketsu	Yoshinogawa			34°03′26″N 134°16′11″E		
Suijin Falls 水神の滝; Suijin no taki	Yoshinogawa			34°02′41″N 134°19′54″E		
Boroboro Falls 母衣暮露滝; Boroboro no taki	Yoshinogawa			33°59′15″N 134°12′32″E		
Amanoiwado Jinja Precinct 天磐戸神社（天の岩戸神社）境内地の一部; Amanoiwado Jinja keidai chi no ichibu	Tsurugi			33°54′19″N 134°03′48″E		
Narutaki Falls 鳴滝 一区域; Narutaki ichi kuiki	Tsurugi			33°58′40″N 134°04′28″E		

== Registered Places of Scenic Beauty ==
As of 1 February 2024, one Monument has been registered (as opposed to designated) as a Place of Scenic Beauty at a national level.

Place	Municipality	Comments	Image	Coordinates	Type	Ref.
Fujikawadani 藤川谷; Fujikawadani	Miyoshi			33°52′34″N 133°43′32″E		

== See also ==
- Cultural Properties of Japan
- List of Historic Sites of Japan (Tokushima)
- List of parks and gardens of Tokushima Prefecture
