= List of historic sites of Japan (Tokushima) =

This list is of the historic sites of Japan located within the Prefecture of Tokushima.

== National Historic Sites ==
As of 1 July 2019, twelve Sites have been designated as being of national significance.

| Site | Municipality | Comments | Image | Coordinates | Type | Ref. |
|---|---|---|---|---|---|---|
| Awa Kokubunni-ji ruins 阿波国分尼寺跡 Awa Kokubunniji ato | Ishii | Nara period provincial nunnery of Awa Province ruins | Awa Kokubunni-ji ruins | 34°04′03″N 134°27′57″E | 3 | 2491 |
| Awa Henro-michi 阿波遍路道 Awa Henro-michi | Anan, Kamiyama, Katsuura, Komatsushima, Miyoshi | pilgrimage route dating from the Heian period; designation comprises Kakurin-ji michi (鶴林寺道), Tairyū-ji michi (太龍寺道), Iwaya michi (いわや道), Kamo michi (かも道), Byōdō-ji michi (平等寺道), Shōsan-ji michi (焼山寺道), Ichinomiya michi (一宮道), Onzan-ji michi (恩山寺道), Tatsue-ji michi (いわや道), Kakurin-ji Precinct (鶴林寺境内), Tairyū-ji Precinct (太龍寺境内), and Unpen-ji michi (雲辺寺道) | Awa Henro-michi | 33°55′06″N 134°39′44″E | 3 | 00003683 |
| Kōzato temple ruins 郡里廃寺跡 Kōzato Haiji ato | Mima | Hakuhō period temple ruins | Kōzato temple ruins | 34°03′14″N 134°03′34″E | 3 | 2493 |
| Shibunomaruyama Kofun 渋野丸山古墳 Shibunomaruyama kofun | Tokushima | Kofun period tumulus | Shibunomaruyama Kofun | 34°00′33″N 134°31′45″E | 1 | 00003623 |
| Shōzui Castle Residence Site 勝瑞城 Shōzui-jō kan ato | Aizumi | Muromachi-Sengoku period castle | Shōzui Castle | 34°07′55″N 134°31′23″E | 2 | 3285 |
| Tanda Kofun 丹田古墳 Tanda Kofun | Higashimiyoshi | Kofun period tumulus | | 34°01′26″N 133°56′11″E | 1 | 2494 |
| Dannozukaana Kofun Cluster 段の塚穴古墳群 Dannozukaana Kofun-gun | Mima | Kofun period tumulus cluster | Dannozukaana Kofun Cluster | 34°03′35″N 134°04′31″E | 1 | 2484 |
| Tokushima Castle 徳島城跡 Tokushima-jō ato | Tokushima | Edo Period castle | Tokushima Castle | 34°04′30″N 134°33′17″E | 2 | 00003476 |
| Tokushima Domain Hachisuka clan cemetery 徳島藩主蜂須賀家墓所 Tokushima han-shu Hachisuka-ke bosho | Tokushima | Edo Period daimyo cemetery | Tokushima Domain Hachisuka clan cemetery | 34°04′59″N 134°33′21″E | 7 | 401 |
| Naruto Itano Kofun Cluster 鳴門板野古墳群 Naruto Itano kofun-gun | Naruto | Kofun period tumuli cluster, designation comprises Ōshiro Kofun (大代古墳), Ikenotani Hōdōji Kofun (池谷宝幢寺古墳), Amanokawawake Jinja Kofun Cluster (天河別神社古墳群), and Hagiwara No.2 Tumulus (萩原２号墓) | Naruto Itano Kofun Cluster | 34°10′22″N 134°34′11″E | 1 | 00003951 |
| Bandō Prisoner-of-War Camp 板東俘虜収容所跡 Bandō furyoshūyōjo ato | Naruto | World War I POW camp | Bandō Prisoner-of-War Camp | 34°09′33″N 134°29′48″E | 2 | 00004042 |
| Wakasugiyama Cinnabar Mine Site 若杉山辰砂採掘遺跡 Wakasugiyama shinsa saikutsu iseki | Anan | late Yayoi to Kofun period Cinnabar Mine traces | | 33°53′43″N 134°31′19″E | 6 | 00004085 |

== Prefectural Historic Sites ==
As of 1 April 2019, twenty-six Sites have been designated as being of prefectural importance.

| Site | Municipality | Comments | Image | Coordinates | Type | Ref. |
|---|---|---|---|---|---|---|
| Ōzato Kofun 大里古墳; Ōzato kofun | Kaiyō | | | 33°35′58″N 134°21′41″E | | for all refs see |
| Shibuno Kofun 渋野の古墳; Shibuno no kofun | Tokushima | designation comprises four tombs | | 34°00′35″N 134°31′43″E | | |
| Yano Kofun 矢野の古墳; Yano no kofun | Tokushima | | | 34°03′36″N 134°28′03″E | | |
| Benkei-no-Iwaya 弁慶の岩屋; Benkei no iwaya | Komatsushima | | | 33°59′28″N 134°34′47″E | | |
| Fukuroi Water Sources 袋井用水の水源地; Fukuroi yōsui no suigen-chi | Tokushima | irrigation canal dating to the Genroku era | | 34°04′20″N 134°30′05″E | | |
| Awa Kokubun-ji Site 阿波国分寺; Awa Kokubunji ato | Tokushima | provincial temple of Awa Province; temple 15 on the Shikoku pilgrimage; the temple gardens are a Place of Scenic Beauty | | 34°03′20″N 134°28′25″E | | |
| Nyūta Tile Kiln Site 入田瓦窯跡; Nyūta gayō ato | Tokushima | | | 34°03′10″N 134°27′29″E | | |
| Kitaoka Kofun 北岡古墳; Kitaoka kofun | Awa | designation comprises two tombs | | 34°04′12″N 134°11′28″E | | |
| Ichinomiya Castle Site 一宮城跡; Ichinomiya-jō ato | Tokushima | | | 34°02′03″N 134°27′47″E | | |
| Ishii Haiji Site 石井廃寺跡; Ishii Haiji ato | Ishii | | | 34°03′35″N 134°25′46″E | | |
| Itano Atagoyama Kofun 板野の愛宕山古墳; Itano Atagoyama kofun | Itano | | | 34°09′03″N 134°28′59″E | | |
| Amanokawawake Jinja Kofun Cluster 天河別神社古墳群; Amanokawawake Jinja kofun-gun | Naruto | in part now a National Historic Site | | 34°09′20″N 134°31′31″E | | |
| Jōroku-ji 丈六寺; Jōrokuji | Tokushima | | | 34°00′19″N 134°33′03″E | | |
| Takinomiya Sutra Mound 滝の宮経塚; Takinomiya kyōzuka | Mima | | | 34°03′30″N 134°03′18″E | | |
| Inubushi Zōzadani Tile Sutra Mound 板野犬伏蔵佐谷瓦経塚; Inubushi Zōzadani gakyōzuka | Itano | | | 34°08′59″N 134°26′57″E | | |
| Kōbe-ji Site 河辺寺跡; Kōbeji ato | Yoshinogawa | | | 34°03′23″N 134°20′44″E | | |
| Kakurin-ji Chō-ishi 鶴林寺の丁石; Kakurinji no chō-ishi | Katsuura | designation comprises eleven stone markers | | 33°54′50″N 134°30′20″E | | |
| Sakurama Pond Site and Stele 桜間の池跡 石碑; Sakurama-no-ike ato sekihi | Ishii | | | 34°05′11″N 134°27′40″E | | |
| Kamodani River Rock Sites 加茂谷川岩陰遺跡群; Kamodani-gawa iwakage iseki-gun | Higashimiyoshi | | | 34°00′35″N 133°56′30″E | | |
| Naruto Morisaki Shell Mound 鳴門市森崎の貝塚; Naruto-shi Morisaki no kaizuka | Naruto | | | 34°09′31″N 134°32′43″E | | |
| Nomura Hachiman Kofun 野村八幡古墳; Nomura Hachiman kofun | Mima | | | 34°03′36″N 134°05′55″E | | |
| Ashiro-Higashibara Site 足代東原遺跡; Ashiro-higashibara iseki | Higashimiyoshi | | | 34°02′31″N 133°54′20″E | | |
| Uezakura Castle Site 上桜城跡; Uezakura-jō ato | Yoshinogawa | designation includes the sites of the honmaru and nishi-no-maru | | 34°03′14″N 134°19′12″E | | |
| German Bridge ドイツ橋附標柱; Doitsu-bashi tsuketari hyōchū | Naruto | built by German prisoners from Bandō prisoner-of-war camp | | 34°10′18″N 134°30′07″E | | |
| Donarimaruyama Kofun 土城丸山古墳; Donarimaruyama kofun | Awa | | | 34°07′04″N 134°23′04″E | | |
| Kawashima Haiji Site 川島廃寺跡; Kawashima haiji ato | Kawashima | | | 34°03′45″N 134°19′12″E | | |

== Municipal Historic Sites ==
As of 1 May 2018, a further one hundred and thirty-three Sites have been designated as being of municipal importance.

== See also ==
- Cultural Properties of Japan
- Awa Province
- Tokushima Prefectural Museum
- List of Places of Scenic Beauty of Japan (Tokushima)
