= Tokushima Domain Hachisuka clan cemetery =

Cemetery in Tokushima Prefecture, Japan

- 徳島藩主蜂須賀家墓所
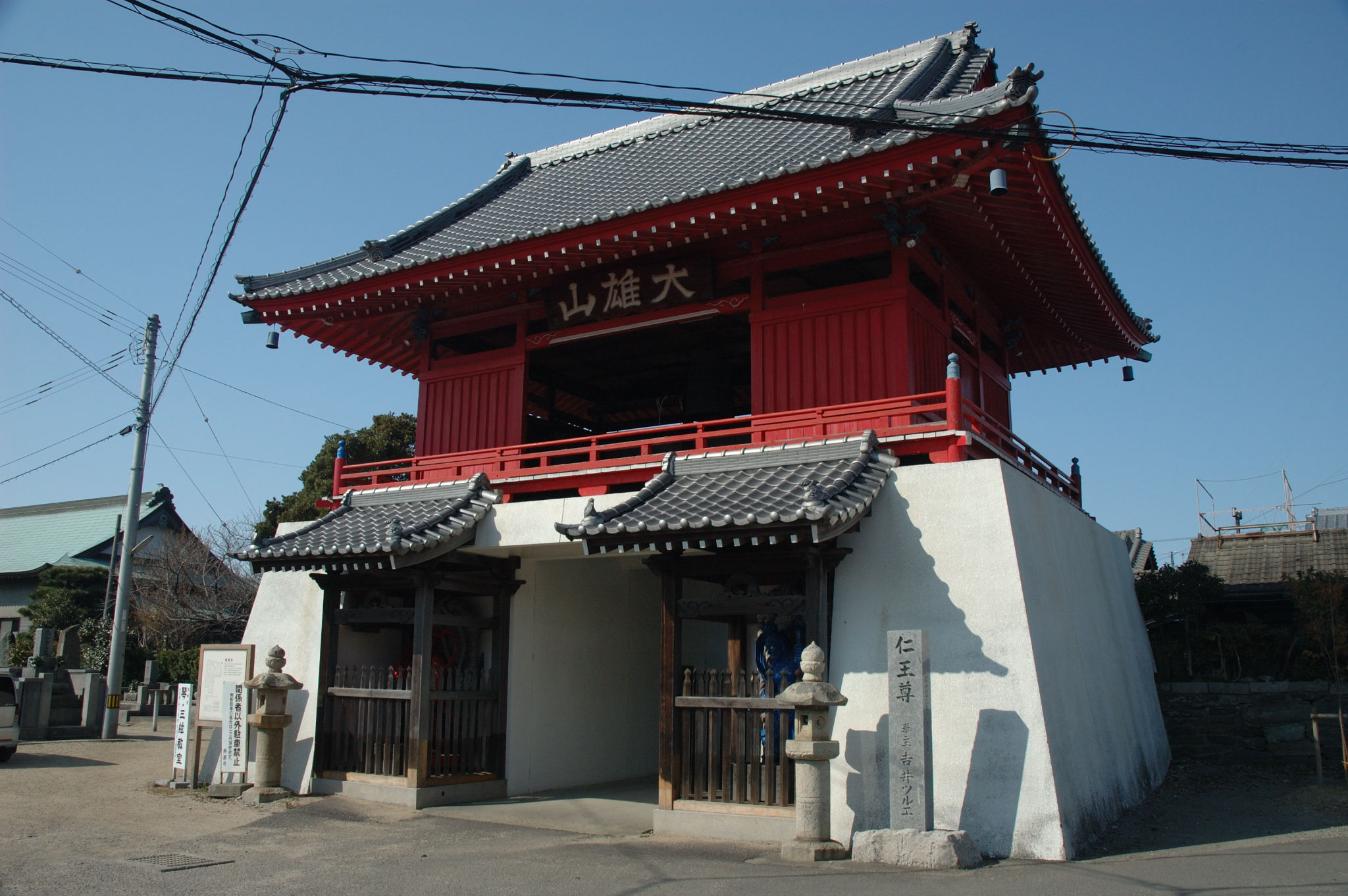
- Gate of Kōgen-ji

Details
- Established: 1661
- Location: Tokushima, Tokushima Prefecture
- Country: Japan
- Type: daimyō cemetery
- Footnotes: National Historic Site of Japan
- Hachisuka clan cemetery (Tokushima Prefecture) Hachisuka clan cemetery (Japan)

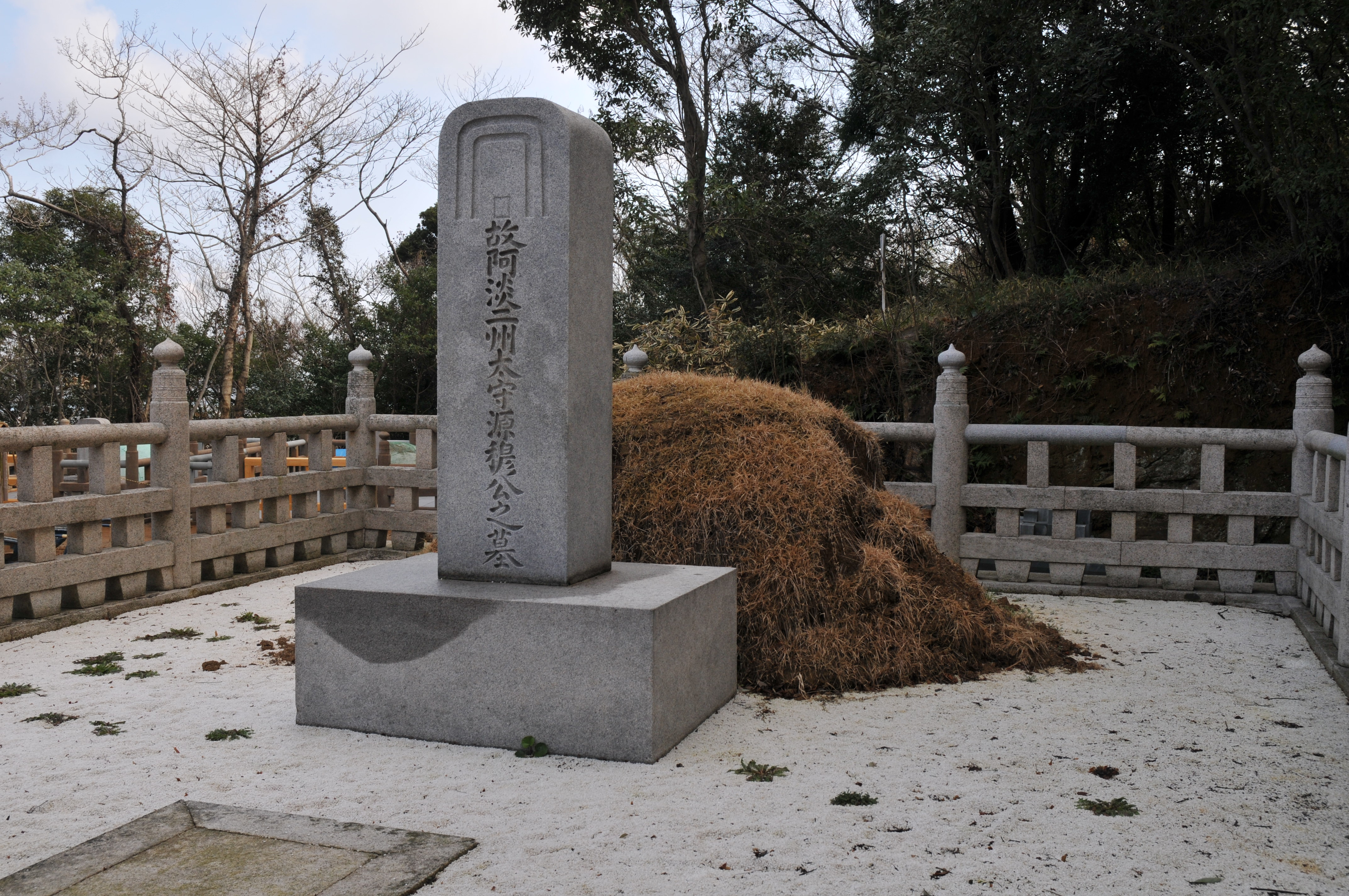
Tomb of 11th daimyō Hachisuka Haruaki at Mannenyama

The Tokushima Domain Hachisuka clan cemetery (徳島藩主蜂須賀家墓所, Tokushima han-shu Hachisuka-ke bosho) refers to two sites located in the city of Tokushima, Tokushima Prefecture, Japan, the Kōgenji cemetery (興源寺墓所) and the Mannenyama cemetery (万年山墓所) The cemeteries contains the graves of the Hachisuka clan, the daimyō of Tokushima Domain under the Edo Period Tokugawa shogunate. The cemeteries were collectively designated a National Historic Site in 2002.

== Background ==
The Hachisuka clan under Hachisuka Masakatsu served Oda Nobunaga under the command of Toyotomi Hideyoshi. In 1585, after Invasion of Shikoku, Hideyoshi awarded him Awa Province as a fief, but he declined in favor of his son, Hachisuka Iemasa. At the time, his territory was only a portion of Awa Province, with a kokudaka of 175,000 koku. He constructed Tokushima Castle, which would remain the clan's seat for the next 300 years. The clan had always been on bad terms with Ishida Mitsunari and at the time of the Battle of Sekigahara, Mitsunari forced Hachisuka Iemasa to take the tonsure and forcibly exiled him to Mount Kōya. However, his son Hachisuka Yoshishige was married to an adopted daughter of Tokugawa Ieyasu, and fought in the Eastern Army. As a result, the Tokugawa Shogunate restored the Hachisuka clan to their domains Hachisuka Yoshishige is regarded as the first daimyō of Tokushima Domain. Hachisuka Yoshishige went on to receive awards seven times from Shogun Tokugawa Hidetada for his actions at the 1614-1615 Battle of Osaka and his territories were expanded to cover all of Awa Province, as well as 70,000 koku in Awaji Province. In 1617, he was granted the remainder of Awaji Island, bringing his total kokudaka to 257,000 koku.

== Kōgenji cemetery ==
The original bodaiji of the Hachisuka clan was Kōganzan Fukuju-ji (江岸山福聚寺), a Rinzai school temple built by Tōgaku, an adopted son of Hachisuka Masakatsu. It was located within the grounds of Tokushima Castle. It was related out of the castle grounds in 1586. Under the 3rd daimyō, Hachisuka Tadateru, the temple of Kōgen-ji was established as the new bodaiji and was given estates of 550 koku for its upkeep. It is located about 900 meters north of Tokushima castle, near the mouth of the Yoshino River. The cemetery is separated from the main temple by an earthen wall and moat, and contains the graves of 13 generations of Hachisuka daimyō from Hachisuka Iemasa to Hachisuka Narihiro. However, from the time of the 10th daimyō, Hachisuka Shigeyoshi a new cemetery was constructed at Mannenyama, and the remains of the 8th daimyō, Hachisuka Muneshige was removed to the new site. The graves for the 9th through 13th daimyō at Kōgen-ji are thus centotaphs, containing only a lock of hair. the tomb stones are made from granite, and the largest is that of Hachisuka Tadateru at 4.24 meters high. In the modern period, Kōgen-ji has declined considerably and in 1985 it turned over its cemetery to the city of Tokushima for use as a park.

== Mannenyama cemetery ==
In 1766, Hachisuka Shigeyoshi established a new clan cemetery based on Confucianism and relocated the grave of the 8th daimyō, Hachisuka Muneshige, to the location. The Manneyama cemetery grew to contain the graves of the succeeding daimyō of Tokushima Domain to the 14th and final daimyō Hachisuka Mochiaki, as well as the tombs of 67 wives, concubines, children and relatives. In 1971, the grave of Hachisuka Masakatsu was relocated to this cemetery from the temple of Kokuon-ji in Tennōji-ku, Osaka. The grave area is about 320 meters east–west by about 780 meters north–south, with an inscription engraved on the bedrock of crystalline schist on the hillside, about 3 meters high and about 8 meters wide. Before World War II, the cemetery was maintained by the former vassals of the clan. However, after the war, the cemetery was not well maintained, and many of the gravestones which had collapsed in the 1946 Nankai earthquake were left unrepaired. The National Historic Site designation has released government funding for the restoration of the site .

== See also ==
- List of Historic Sites of Japan (Tokushima)
