= Wakasugiyama Site =

Wakasugiyama Cinnabar Production Site
- 若杉山辰砂採掘遺跡 (Japanese)
- Wakasugiyama Cinnabar Production Site Wakasugiyama Site (Japan)
- Interactive map of Wakasugiyama Cinnabar Production Site
- 33°53′43″N 134°31′19″E
- Periods: Yayoi - Kofun period
- Location: Anan, Tokushima, Japan
- Region: Shikoku region

Site notes
- Public access: No

The Wakasugiyama Cinnabar Mine (若杉山辰砂採掘遺跡, Wakasugiyama shinshasaikutsu iseki) is an archaeological site with the traces of a late Yayoi to early Kofun period cinnabar production site, located in the Suii neighborhood of the city of Anan, Tokushima on the island of Shikoku in Japan. It was designated a National Historic Site of Japan in 2019.

== Overview ==
Cinnabar, the raw material for vermilion, is found in crystalline form in exposed quartz veins the limestone and chert slopes on the west side of the Wakasugitani River, which is a tributary of the Naka River that flows eastward through southern Tokushima Prefecture. The site is at an elevation of 140 to170 meters one north side of the temple of Tairyū-ji. Its existence was known in the 1950s, but it was not excavated until 1984. Vermillion was used extensively in ancient Japan on dotaku, earthenware, and to decorate the walls of kofun burial chambers, and was used in funeral ceremonies. In the Chinese history Wajinden, it is recorded that cinnabar was a noted product of the Kingdom of Wa and was among the tribute items offered by Queen Himiko to the Cao Wei Court.

At the Wakasugiyama site, cinnabar extraction was carried out by breaking the bedrock to expose the quartz veins. In one case this was in the form of an open pit mine, and the other was by digging into the slope in a horizontal hole. Some processing also occurred on site, including splitting rock and crushing using stone pestles and stone mills made of porphyrite, which can be found in the eastern part of Kagawa Prefecture. Excavated artifacts also include shards of earthenware which originated from the lower Akui River and the lower Koto River, and it is believed that tribes in those areas were involved in the mining of cinnabar. This is the only archaeological site for cinnabar mining in Japan.

== See also ==
- List of Historic Sites of Japan (Tokushima)
