= Kuramoto Station (Tokushima) =

Railway station in Tokushima, Japan

B02 Kuramoto Station 蔵本駅
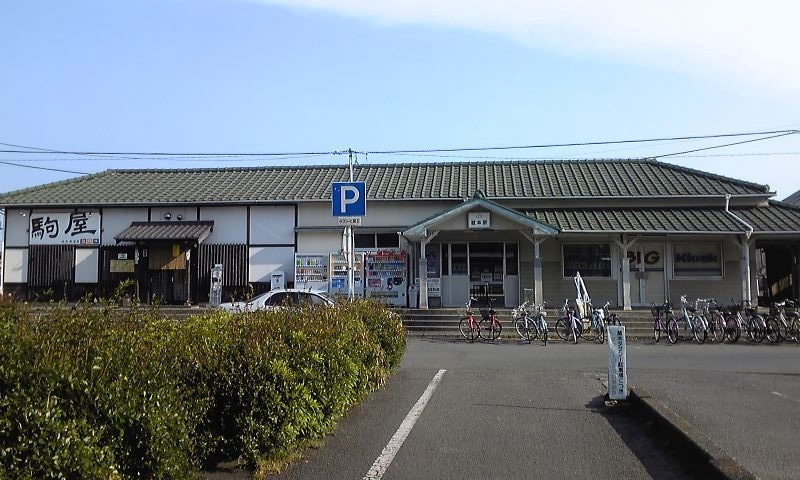
- Kuramoto Station Entrance, May 2010

General information
- Location: 2 Chome Kuramotochō, Tokushima-shi, Tokushima-ken 770-0042; Japan
- Coordinates: 34°04′46″N 134°31′06″E
- Operator: JR Shikoku
- Line: ■ Tokushima Line
- Distance: 65.6 km from Tsukuda
- Platforms: 2 side platforms
- Tracks: 2 + several sidings

Construction
- Structure type: At grade

Other information
- Status: Unstaffed
- Station code: B02

History
- Opened: 12 September 1899

Passengers
- FY2019: 453
Location
- Location within Tokushima Prefecture Location within Japan

Kuramoto Station (蔵本駅, Kuramoto-eki) is a passenger railway station located in the city of Tokushima, Tokushima Prefecture, Japan. It is operated by JR Shikoku and has the station number "B02".

== Lines ==
Kuramoto Station is served by the Tokushima Line and is 65.6 km from the beginning of the line at Tsukuda. Besides local service trains, the Tsurugisan limited express service also stops at Kuramoto.

== Layout ==
The station consists of two opposed side platforms serving 2 tracks. The station building is unstaffed and serves only as a waiting room. Access to the opposite side platform is by means of a footbridge. Several sidings branch off both tracks.

=== Platforms ===
1	■ Tokushima Line	for Anabuki and Awa-Ikeda; Sako and Tokushima
2	■ Tokushima Line	for passing trains only

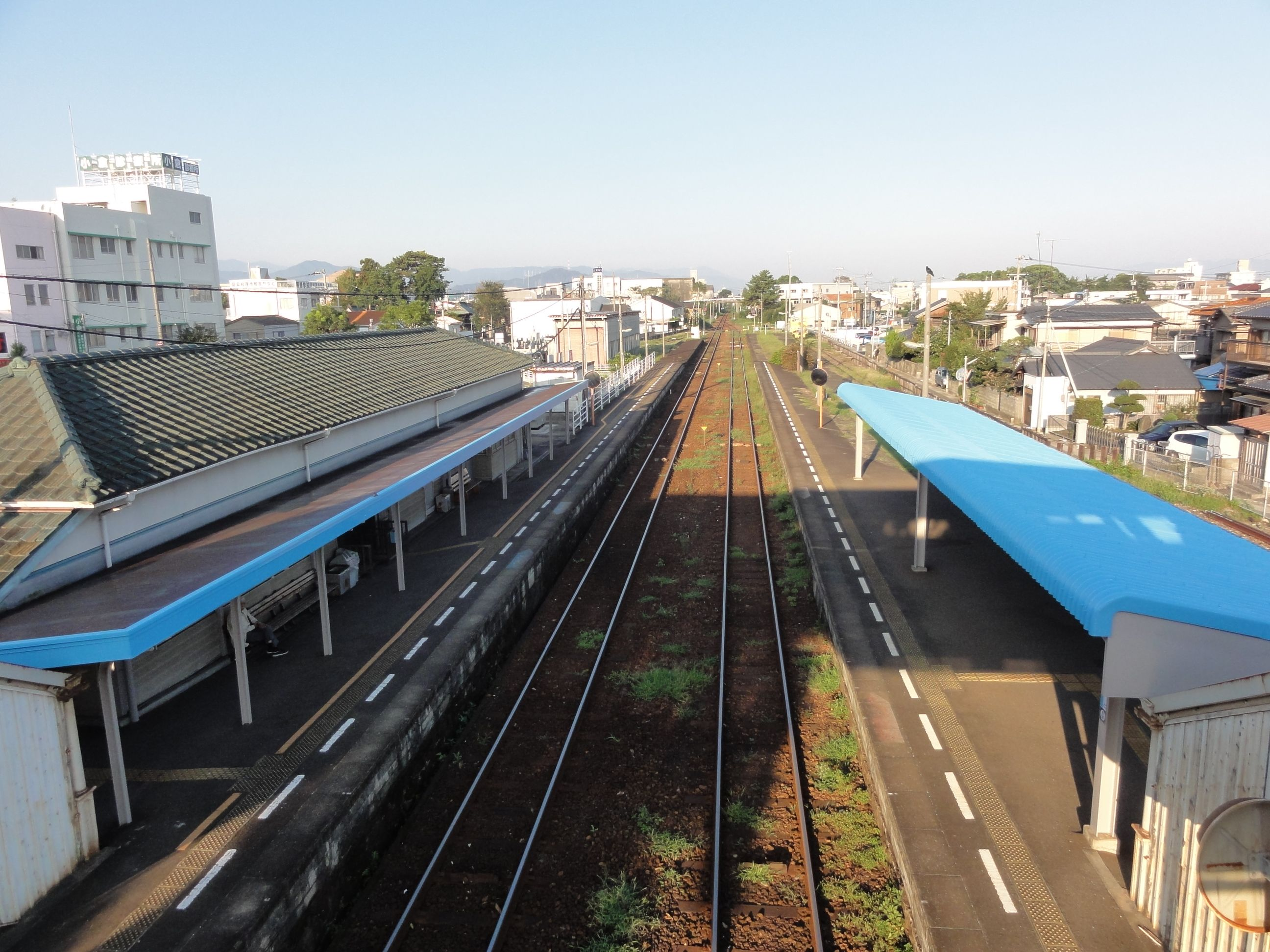
A view of the station platforms and tracks looking in the direction of Tsukuda.

== Adjacent stations ==
«	Service	»
JR Limited Express Services
Ishii	Tsurugisan	Tokushima
Tokushima Line
Akui	Local	Sako

== History ==
The station was opened on 12 September 1899 by the privately run Tokushima Railway. When the company was nationalized on 1 September 1907, Japanese Government Railways (JGR) took over control of the station and operated it as part of the Tokushima Line (later the Tokushima Main Line). With the privatization of Japanese National Railways (JNR), the successor of JGR, on 1 April 1987, the station came under the control of JR Shikoku. On 1 June 1988, the line was renamed the Tokushima Line.

== Passenger statistics ==
In fiscal 2019, the station was used by an average of 453 passengers daily

== Surrounding area ==
The station is located center of the western part of Tokushima city and is a student town centered on the Kuramoto Campus of Tokushima University. The area around the station is a cohesive commercial area. It is also where large-scale hospitals such as Tokushima University Hospital are concentrated.

- Tokushima University Hospital
- Tokushima Prefectural Central Hospital
- Tokushima Prefectural Medical Examination Center

== See also ==
- List of railway stations in Japan
