= Shibunomaruyama Kofun =

Burial mound in Japan

- 渋野丸山古墳 (Japanese)
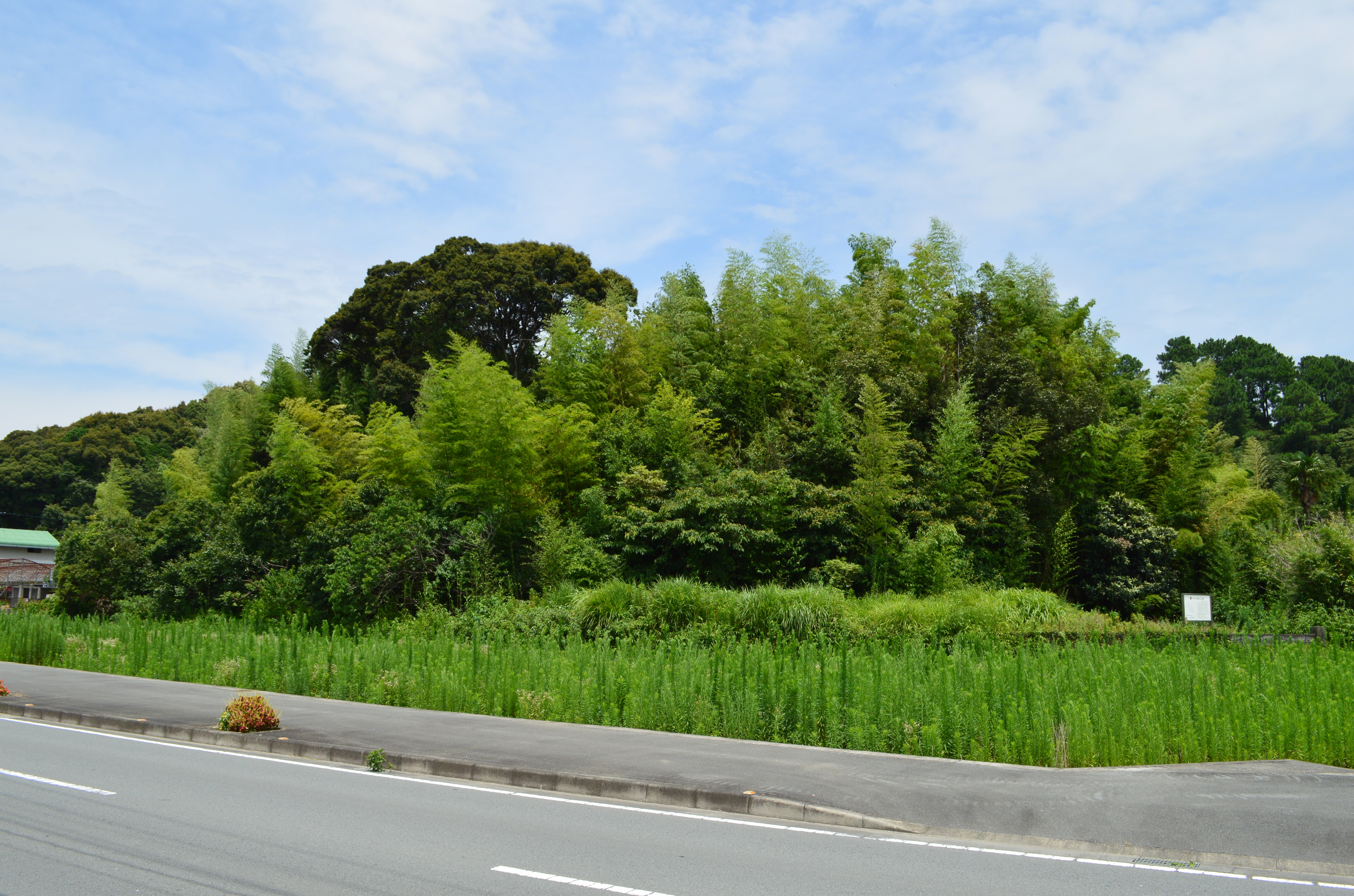
- Shibunomaruyama Kofun

- Shibunomaruyama Kofun Shibunomaruyama Kofun (Japan)
- Interactive map of Shibunomaruyama Kofun
- 34°0′33.66″N 134°31′44.02″E
- Type: Kofun
- Periods: Kofun period
- Location: Tokushima, Tokushima, Japan
- Region: Shikoku region

History
- Built: c.early 5th century

Site notes
- Public access: Yes

The Shibunomaruyama Kofun (渋野丸山古墳) is a Kofun period burial mound, located in the Mitsuiwa hamlet of the Shibuno neighborhood of the city of Tokushima on the island of Shikoku in Japan. It was designated a National Historic Site of Japan in 2009, with the area under protection expanded in 2012

== Overview ==
The Shibunomaruyama Kofun is located on the left bank of the Tatara River (Katsuura River system) in the eastern part of Tokushima Prefecture and the southern part of the Tokushima Plain. It is a zenpō-kōen-fun (前方後円墳), which is shaped like a keyhole, having one square end and one circular end, when viewed from above, and is orientated to the west. It is the largest of a cluster of tumuli in the lower reaches of the Katsuura River, and has been known to academia since 1923, with several archaeological excavations conducted since 1999. The tumulus was constructed in three tiers, with the lowest tier now below the ground surface level. The length of the mound is 105 meters, which is the largest in Tokushima Prefecture and the second largest in Shikoku after the Tomita Chausan Kofun in Sanuki, Kagawa (139 meters). On the surface of the mound, fukiishi, cylindrical, morning glory-shaped, and figurative haniwa (house-shaped, shield-shaped, lid-shaped, armor-shaped, boat-shaped) have been found, along with Haji ware pottery. In addition, there is a construct on the south side of the mound, from which many small jars, as well as colander-shaped earthenware and haniwa fragments have been excavated. Asymmetrical moats with a width 4 to 13 meters partially surround the mound. The burial chamber is believed to be in the posterior circular portion, but it has not been excavated, so details are not clear. Per a ground penetrating radar survey, the chamber appears to be five by 2.5 meters along the east-west main axis of the mound, but has possibly been robbed in antiquity, as large stones have been reused in the garden of nearby Hase-dera temple as a stone bridge.

This tumulus is presumed to have been built around the first half of the 5th century in the first half of the middle Kofun period, based on the style and excavated artifacts. In the Tokushima area, tumuli were built mainly in the Naruto / Itano areas and the Kinaiyama areas in the early Kofun period, but from the latter half of the early period, tumuli began to be built in the lower reaches of the Katsuura River.

In 1953, the tumulus area was designated as a Tokushima Prefectural Historic Site together with the surrounding Tennomori Kofun, Shinmiyazuka Kofun, Hanaoritsuka Kofun, and Manjozuka Kofun. In 2009, the Shibunomaruyama Kofun was designated as a National Historic Site.

Overall length
105 meters
Posterior circular portion
69 meter diameter x 18 meters high x 3-tier
Anterior rectangular portion
59 meters wide x 16 meters high x 3-tier
Connecting restriction
44 meters wide

== See also ==
- List of Historic Sites of Japan (Tokushima)
