= Dannozukaana Kofun Cluster =

Dannozukaana Kofun cluster
- 段の塚穴古墳群 (Japanese)
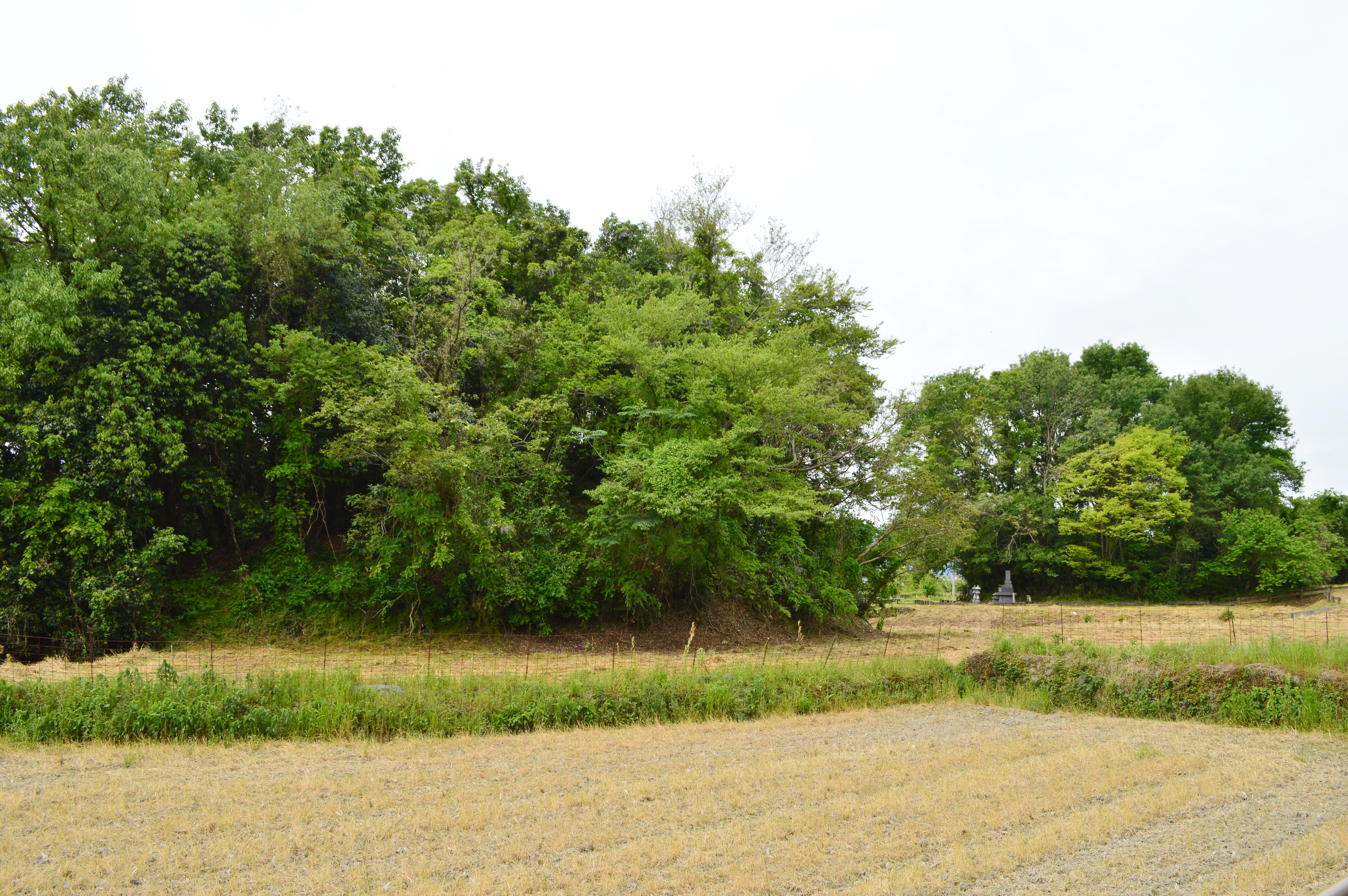
- Dannozukaana Kofun cluster; Taikozuka on the left, Tanazuka on the right

- Dannozukaana Dannozukaana Kofun Cluster (Japan)
- 34°3′35.03″N 134°4′31.05″E
- Type: Kofun
- Periods: Kofun period
- Location: Mima, Tokushima, Japan
- Region: Shikoku region

History
- Built: c.late 6th century

Site notes
- Public access: Yes
- National Historic Site of Japan

The Dannozukaana Kofun cluster (段の塚穴古墳群) is a pair of Kofun period burial mounds, located in the Mima neighborhood of the city of Mima, Tokushima on the island of Shikoku in Japan. It was designated a National Historic Site of Japan in 1942.

== Overview ==
The Dannozukaana is a pair of fun-style circular kofun located at the tip of a fluvial terrace on the north bank of the Yoshino River in western Tokushima Prefecture. The larger tumulus on the east is called the Taikozuka Kofun (太鼓塚古墳) and the smaller one on the west is the Tanazuka Kofun (棚塚古墳). The tumuli were first excavated in 1951.

The Taikozuka Kofun has a diameter of about 37 meters and a height of 10 meters, with a horizontal hole- type stone burial chamber in the center. The burial chamber is 13.1 meters in total length, 4.3 high and 3.4 meters wide, which is the largest in Tokushima Prefecture. The entrance room has a unique structure in which the ceiling is carried diagonally, the side walls are lined up, and the entrance room is shaped like a dome. The stones are mainly crystalline schist, with split stones on the walls and large natural stones on the ceiling stones and gate sleeve stones. Iron products, including horse harnesses, and Sue and Haji ware pottery have been found as grave goods. From these artifacts, it is believed that the tumulus dates from the latter half of the 6th century to the beginning of the 7th century.

The Tanazuka Kofun has a diameter of about 20 meters and a height of about 7 meters, and likewise has a horizontal hole type burial chamber. The burial chamber has a total length of 8.7 meters, a height of 2.8 meters, and a width of 2 meters, with a dome-shaped entry vestibule and a magnificent stone shelf on the back wall, which appears to be the origin of its name. No grave goods have been found in this tumulus.

This style of burial chamber is found only in the Mima area. The construction period of both tumuli is estimated to be around the latter part of the Kofun period. The grave goods excavated from the tumuli are exhibited at the Mima Folk Museum in the precincts of Gansho-ji Temple, about 2 kilometers away.

== Gallery ==
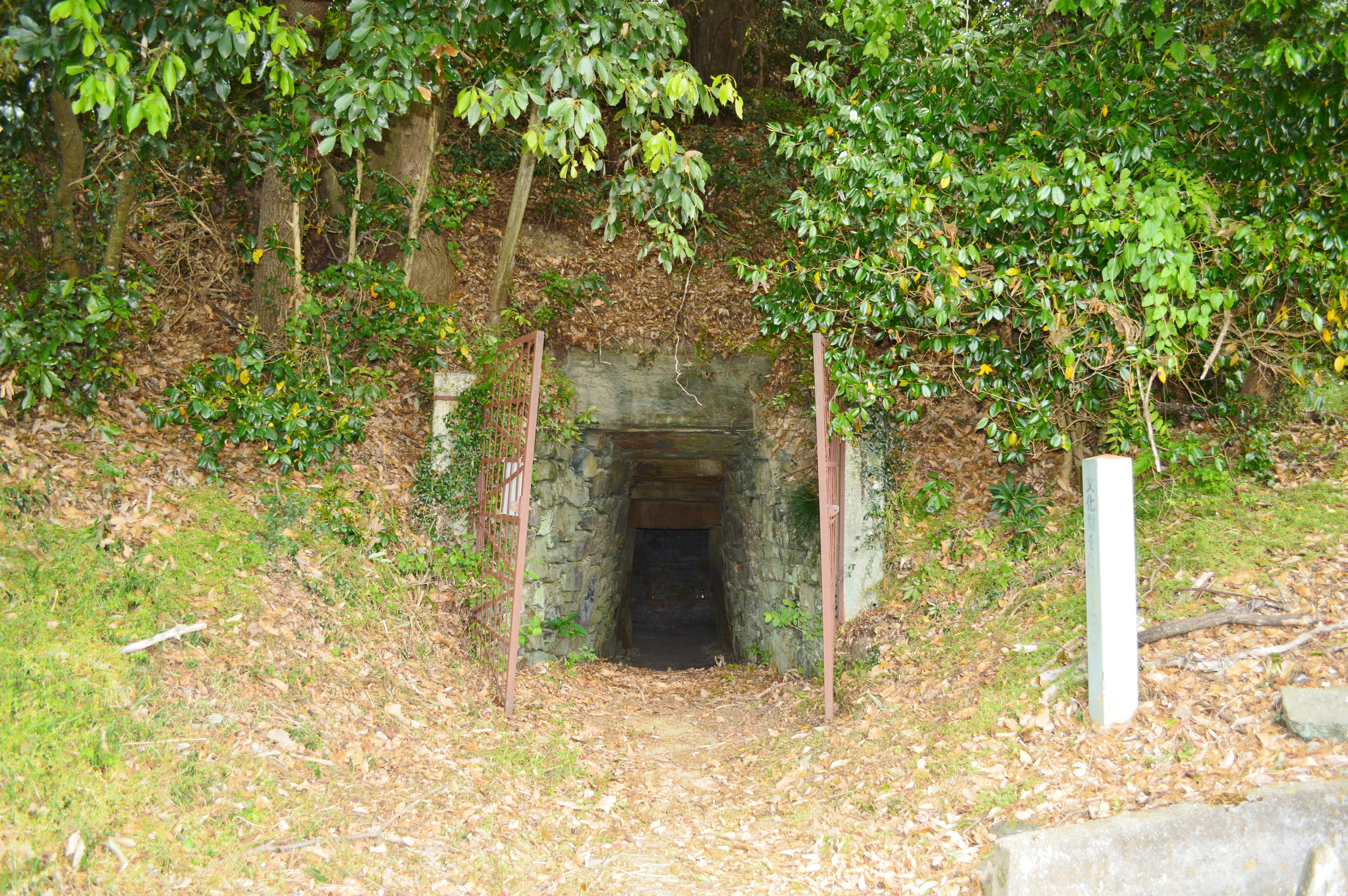
Taikozuka Kofun, entrance

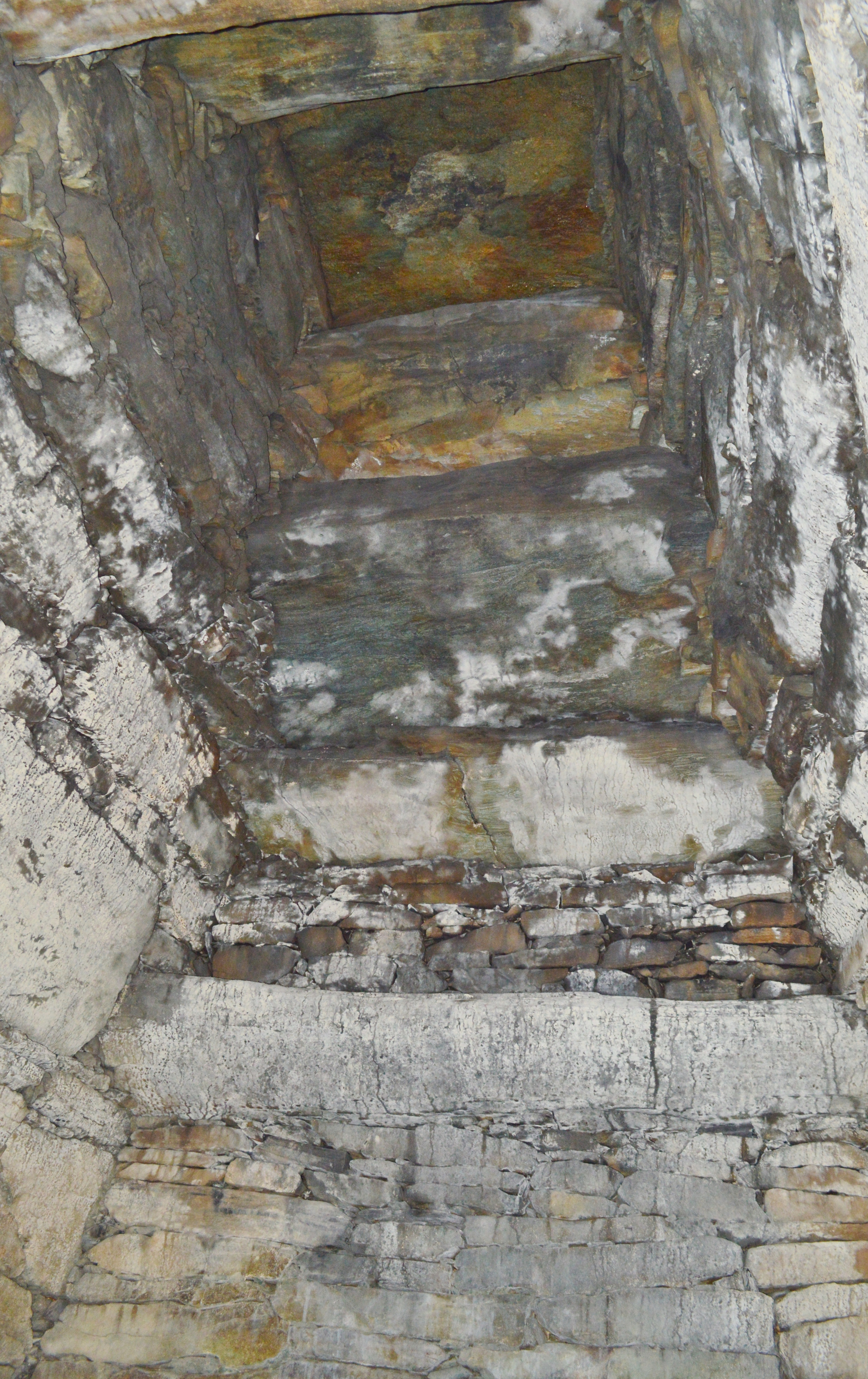
Taikozuka Kofun, ceiling of burial chamber

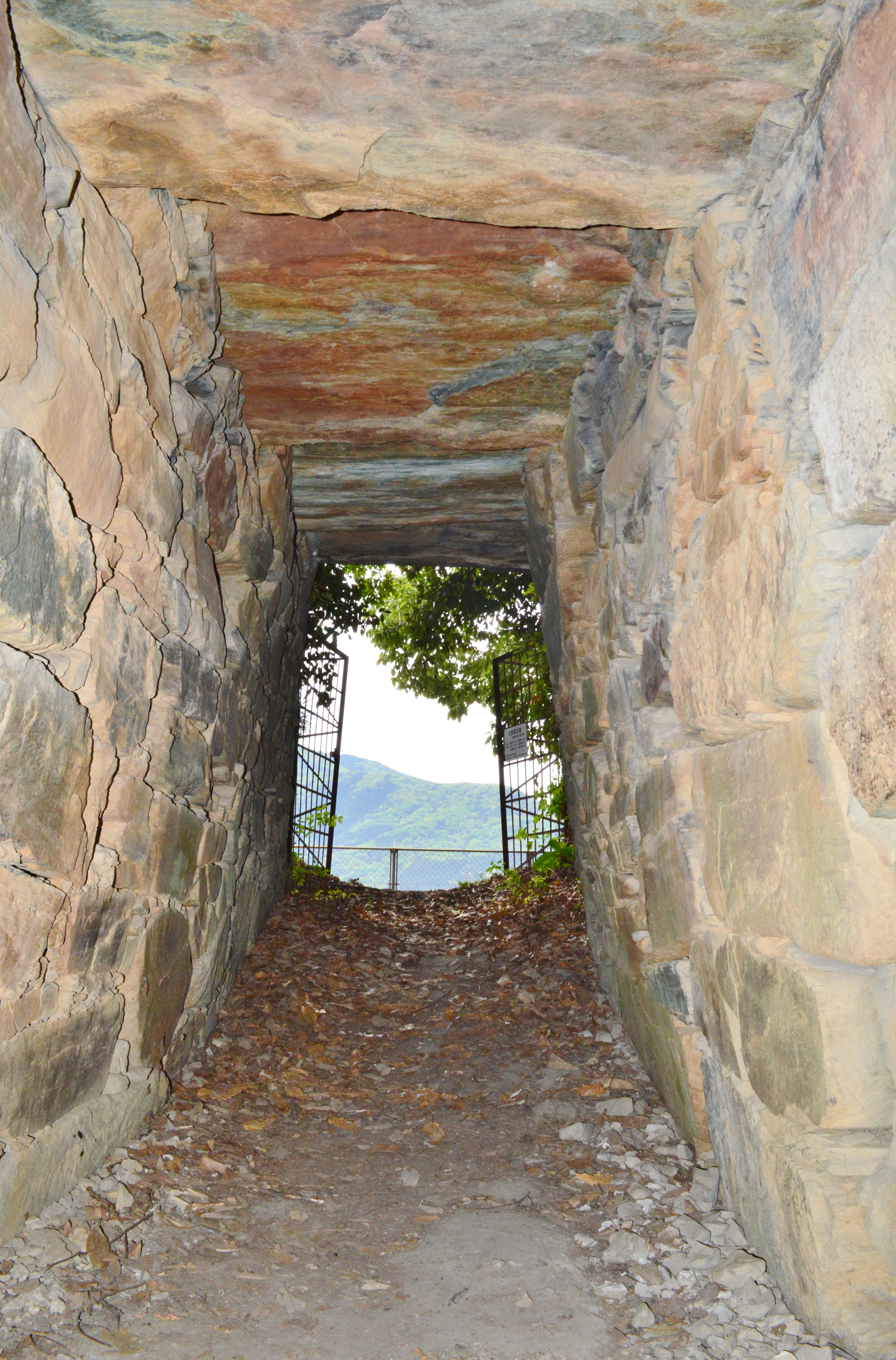
Taikozuka Kofun, inside, looking towards entrance

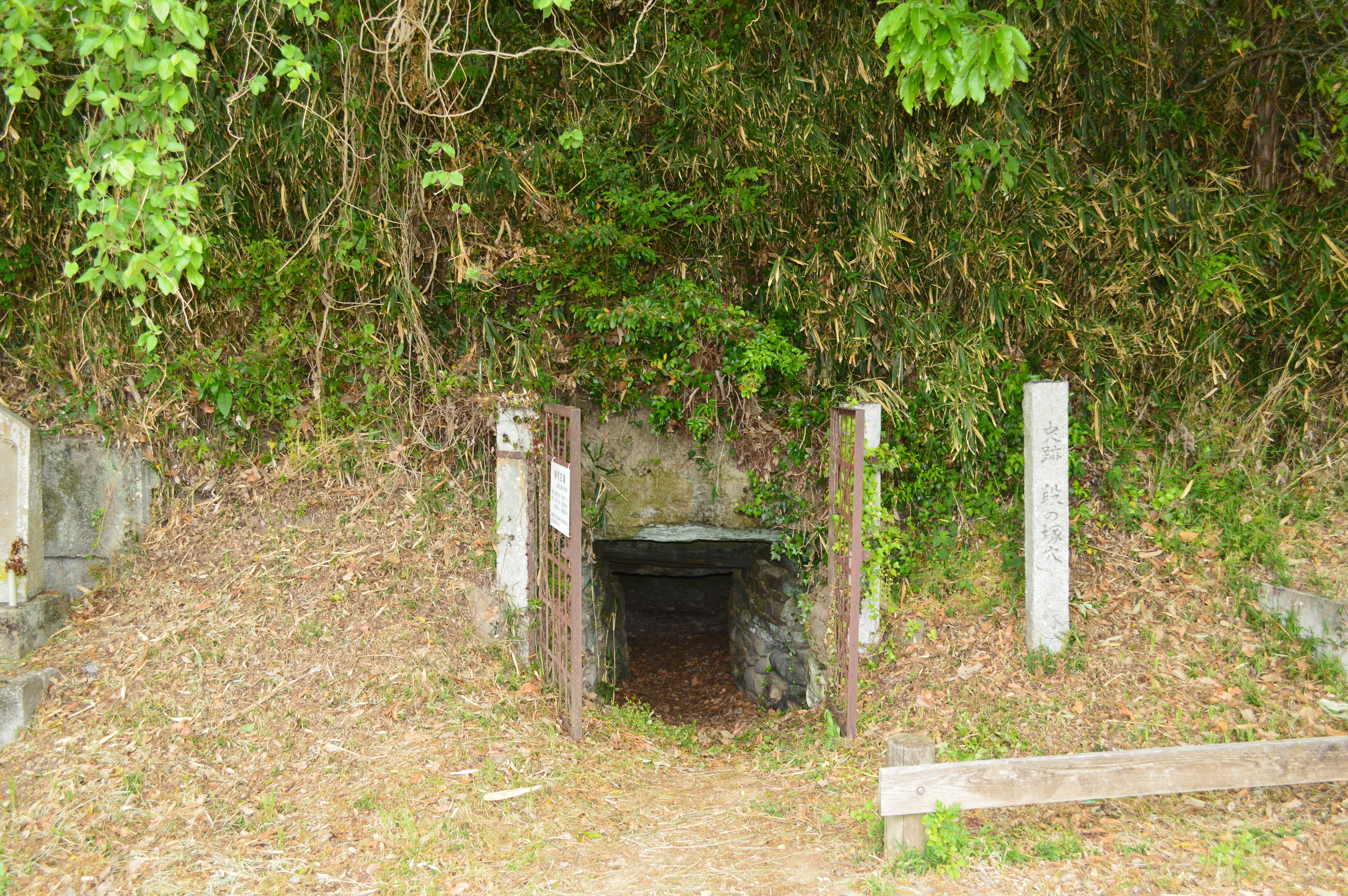
Tanazuka Kofun, entrance

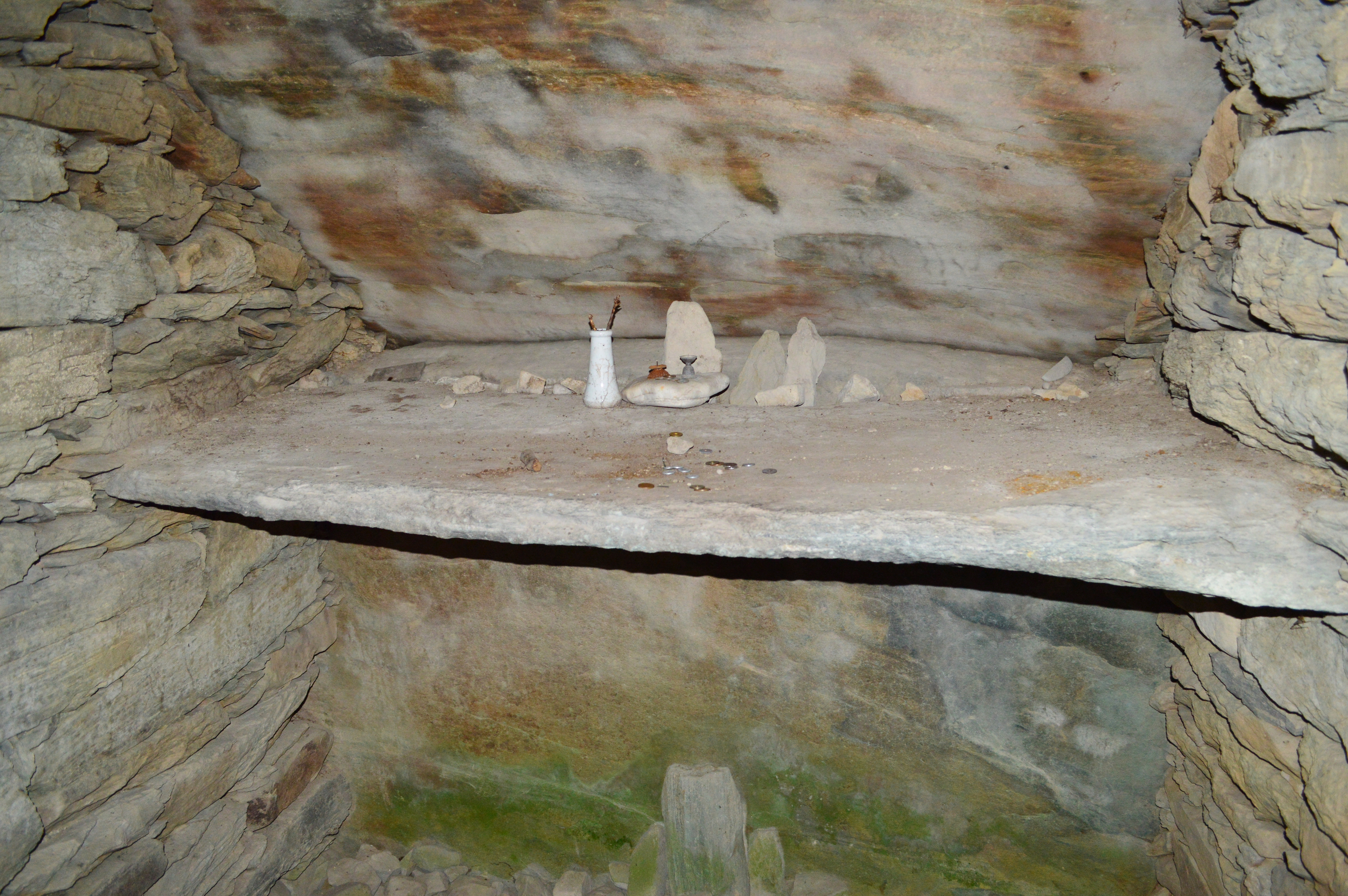
Tanazuka Kofun, stone shelf

== See also ==
- List of Historic Sites of Japan (Tokushima)
