= Akui Station =

Railway station in Tokushima, Japan

B03 Akui Station 鮎喰駅
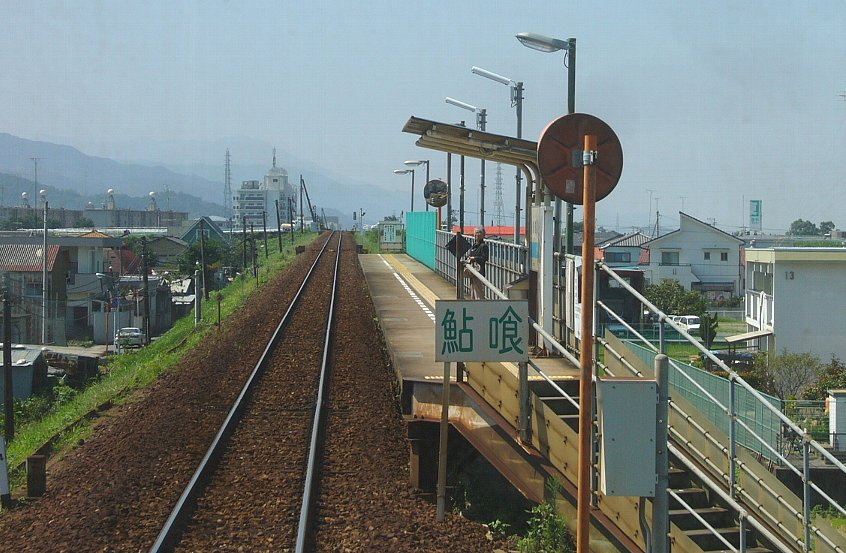
- Akui Station platform in 2006

General information
- Location: 5-chome Shōmachi, Tokushima-shi, Tokushima-ken 770-0044; Japan
- Coordinates: 34°04′39″N 134°30′22″E
- Operator: JR Shikoku
- Line: ■ Tokushima Line
- Distance: 64.5 km from Tsukuda
- Platforms: 1 side platforms
- Tracks: 1

Construction
- Structure type: Embankment
- Accessible: No - steps lead up to platform

Other information
- Status: Unstaffed
- Station code: B03

History
- Opened: 20 September 1934

Passengers
- FY2017: 223
Location
- Location within Tokushima Prefecture Location within Japan

Akui Station (鮎喰駅, Akui-eki) is a passenger railway station located in the city of Tokushima, Tokushima Prefecture, Japan. It is operated by JR Shikoku and has the station number "B03".

== Lines ==
Akui Station is served by the Tokushima Line and is 64.5 km from the beginning of the line at Tsukuda. Only trains from the local service stop at the station.

== Layout ==
The station, which is unstaffed, consists of a side platform serving a single track on an embankment. There is no station building, only a shelter on the platform for waiting passengers. A flight of steps leads up the embankment to the platform from the access road. At the base of the steps is a "tickets corner" (a shelter housing a ticket vending machine), a public telephone call box and a paved area for the parking of bicycles.

== Adjacent stations ==
«	Service	»
Tokushima Line
Limited Express Tsurugisan: Does not stop at this station
Kō	Local	Kuramoto

== History ==
The station was opened on 20 September 1934 by Japanese Government Railways (JGR) on the then Tokushima Main Line. With the privatization of Japanese National Railways (JNR), the successor of JGR, on 1 April 1987, the station came under the control of JR Shikoku. On 1 June 1988, the line was renamed the Tokushima Line.

== Passenger statistics ==
In fiscal 2017, the station was used by an average of 233 passengers daily

== Surrounding area ==
The area around the station is a residential area on the outskirts of Tokushima city.

- Tokushima Prefectural Josei High School
- Tokushima City Kamona Elementary School
- Tokushima City Kamona Junior High Scho

== See also ==
- List of railway stations in Japan
