= Naruto Itano Kofun Cluster =

Kofun period burial mound cluster in Naruto, Tokushima, Japan

Naruto Itano Kofun cluster
- 鳴門板野古墳群 (Japanese)
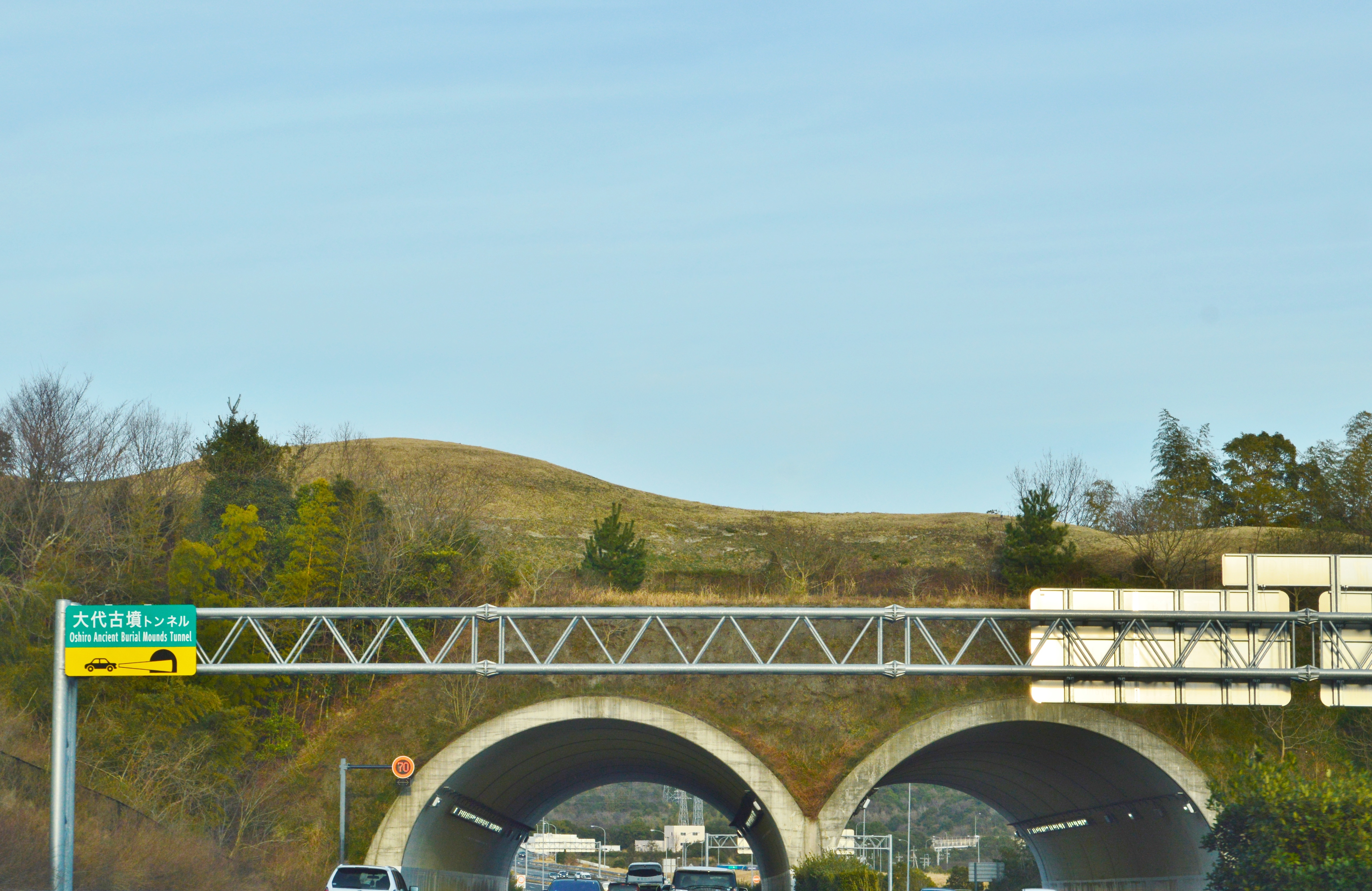
- Ōshiro Kofun within the Naruto Itano Kofun cluster

- Naruto Itano Kofun cluster cluster Naruto Itano Kofun Cluster (Japan)
- Interactive map of Naruto Itano Kofun cluster
- 34°10′21.31″N 134°34′11.07″E
- Type: Kofun
- Periods: Kofun period
- Location: Naruto and Itano, Tokushima, Japan
- Region: Shikoku

History
- Built: late 4th - mid-5th century AD

Site notes
- Public access: Yes

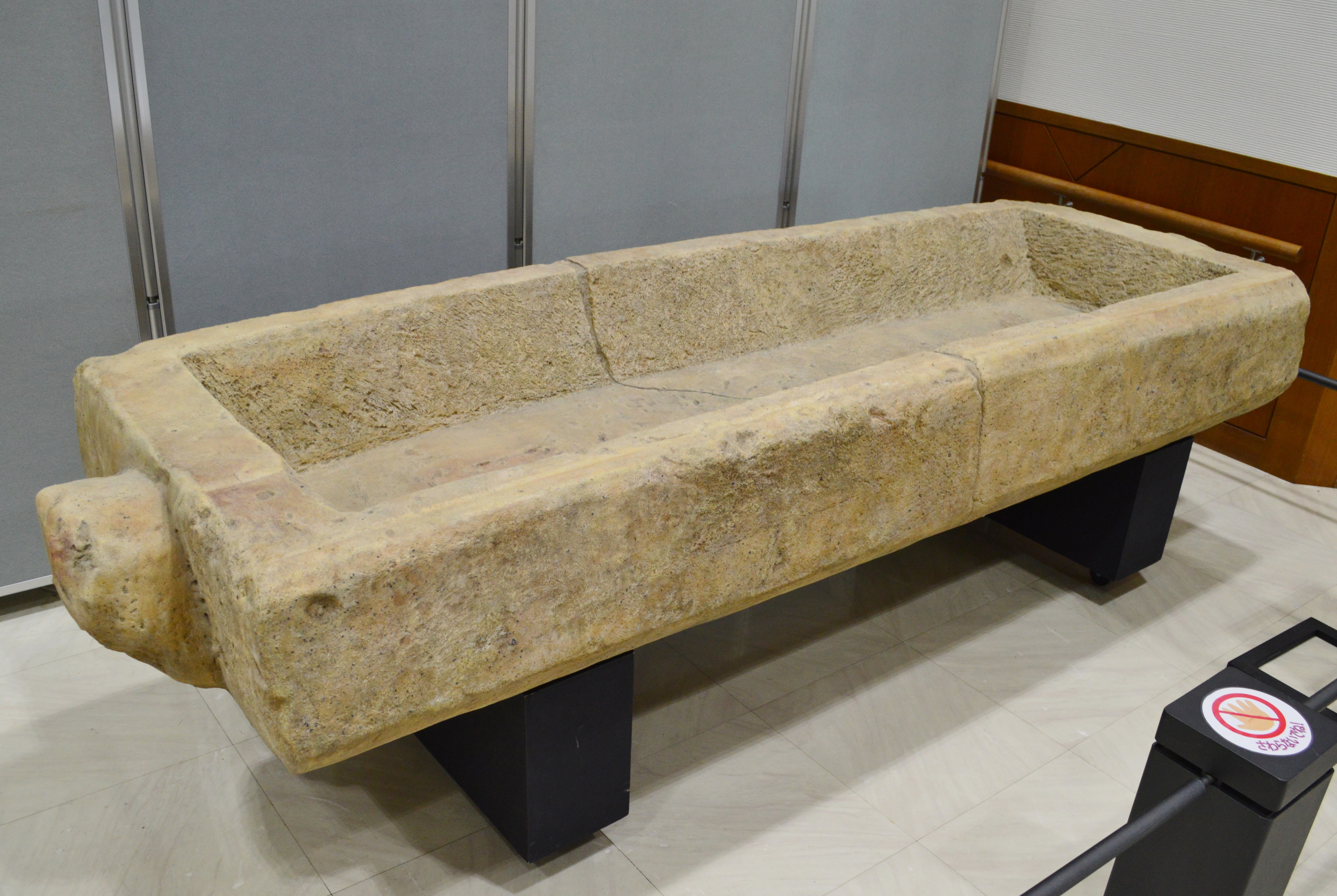
stone sarcophagus from the Ōshiro Kofun

The Naruto Itano Kofun cluster (鳴門板野古墳群, Naruto Itano kofun-gun) is a group of nine kofun burial mounds located between the city of Naruto and Itano, Tokushima Prefecture, on the island of Shikoku, Japan. The tumuli were collectively designated a National Historic Site in 2016.

== Overview ==
The Naruto Itano Kofun cluster is located along an eleven kilometer area at the southeastern foot of the Asan Mountains, which crosses the northern part of Tokushima Prefecture from east to west. The tumuli date from the end of the Yayoi period into the early Kofun period, and show the gradual evolution of tomb building in eastern Shikoku and how it was increasingly influenced by the Kinai region of Japan during this period. The tumuli are roughly divided into two groups. The Amanokawawake Jinja Kofun cluster (天河別神社古墳群) was threatened with destruction due to prefectural road construction in 1978 and the Ōshiro Kofun cluster (大代古墳群) was likewise treated by construction of an extension of the Cross-Shikoku Expressway in 2000. In both cases, the findings of rescue archaeology convinced relevant authorities to revise construction methods to tunneling in order to preserve both sites, and full archaeological excavations have been conducted since 2005.

== Hagiwara No.2 Kofun ==
The Hagiawara No.2 Kofun (萩原２号墓) is a late Yayoi period stone mound tomb consisting of a 5.6 meter long protrusion attached to a 21.2 meter diameter circular hill built on the ridge with a north-south axis and an elevation of 42 to 43 meters. The stones in the mound are about 80-cm in diameter. A burial chamber made of crystalline schist class contained a box-shaped wooden coffin aligned east-to-west. Grave goods included fragments of a bronze mirror and Yayoi pottery. Although resembling a keyhole-shaped tomb, it predates true zenpō-kōen-fun by a couple of centuries, leading to much speculation by archaeologists on its design.

== Amanokawawake Jinja Kofun Cluster ==
The Amanokawawake Jinja Kofun Cluster (天河別神社古墳群) consists of at least 11 tumuli, of which only No.1 through No.4 are protected by the National Historic Site designation.

Amanokawawake Jinja Kofun No. 1 is an enpun (円墳)-style circular mound with a diameter of about 25 meters built on a ridge at an elevation of 19.5 to 22.6 meters. Haniwa were not excavated, and many pieces of Haji pottery painted with red cinnabar were excavated from the mound. At the top of the burial mound, a vertical stone burial chamber made of crystalline schist slabs was constructed on the north-south main axis. Grave goods included two iron swords, one iron ax, one iron handle, two bronze swords, and one bronze mirror. The construction period is considered to be the first half of the early Kofun period. However, the burial chamber inherits the same structure as the Hagiwara No. 2 Kofun.

Amanokawawake Jinja Kofun No. 2 is also an enpun-style circular mound with a diameter of about 26 meters, built close on the same ridge as Amanokawawake Jinja Kofun No.1. Fukiishi were fond on the mound, but no haniwa were confirmed. Many pieces of painted Haji pottery were excavated. At the top of the burial mound, is what seems to be the ceiling stone of the burial chamber, but no grave goods have been found. The construction period is from the first half of the early Kofun period.

Amanokawawake Jinja Kofun No. 3 is a zenpō-kōen-fun (前方後円墳), which is shaped like a keyhole, having one square end and one circular end, when viewed from above. with a total length of about 41 meters, a posterior circle diameter of about 24 meters. It is located on a ridge at an elevation of 18.5 to 26.5 meters to the southwest of the above tumuli. Fukiishi have been found, but no haniwa have been confirmed, and a few pieces of Haji pottery have been excavated. The tomb has not been excavated, so details of the burial chamber are unknown. The construction period is believed to be the latter half of the early Kofun period.

Amanokawawake Jinja Kofun No. 4 is located on a ridge with a north-south axis at an elevation of 26 to 28 meters. The shape of the tumulus is uncertain, but it is general considered a keyhole-shaped tumulus with a posterior circular diameter of 20 to 25 meters, and an anterior length of 15 to 20 meters. Most of the burial chamber has disappeared, leaving only the gravel floor. Iron spears, iron irons, and bronze mirror pieces have been confirmed as grave goods, placing the construction period to be in the first half of the early Kofun period.

== Hōdōji Kofun ==
The Hōdōji Kofun (宝幢寺古墳) is a keyhole-shaped tumulus built on a north-south ridge at an elevation of 27 to 32.5 meters. It has a total length of about 47 meters, with a posterior circle diameter of about 28 meters, and a front length of about 19 meters. The excavation survey confirmed that cylindrical and "morning-glory"-shaped haniwa were laid on the mound. However, during the Edo Period, the posterior circular portion of the tumulus was highly modified to hold the tombs of the chief priests of the Buddhist temple of Hōdō-ji, which destroyed the burial chamber. From its style, this kofun is thought to date from the latter half of the early Kofun period.

== Ōshiro Kofun ==
The Ōshiro Kofun (大代古墳) is a keyhole-shaped tumulus built on a north-south ridge at an elevation of 41 to 47 meter. It has a total length of about 54 meters, with a posterior circle diameter of about 31 meters, and a front length of about 23 meters. Cylindrical and house-shaped haniwa have been found on the tumulus. The burial chamber is a vertical stone chamber made of crystalline schist stone slabs, containing a hollow boat-shaped sarcophagus made of white tuff which originated in there of modern Sanuki, Kagawa. Grave goods included iron swords, iron axes, and other iron objects, talc stone mortar balls, green magatama, and bronze mirrors. The tumulus dates from the latter half of the early Kofun period. The Ōshiro Kofun is part of a cluster containing two smaller enpun-style round tumuli. The Ōshiro No.2 Kofun is to the north and has a diameter of 22 meters. The Ōshiro No.3 Kofun is to the south, and has a diameter of 15 meters.

== See also ==
- List of Historic Sites of Japan (Tokushima)
