= Kōzato temple ruins =

Historic religious ruin in Mima, Tokushima, Japan

- 郡里廃寺跡 (Japanese)
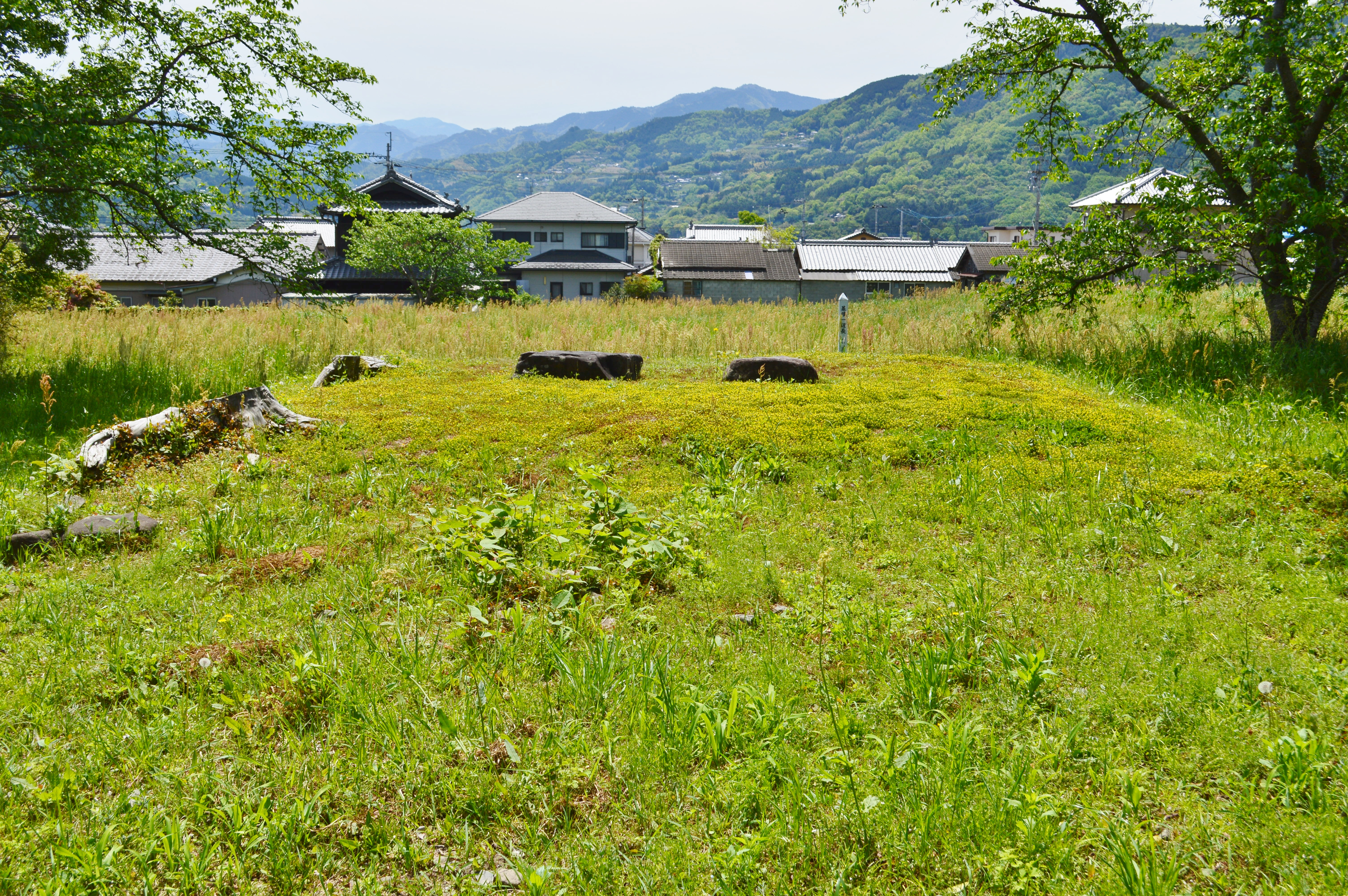
- site of the Pagoda at the Kōzato temple ruins

- Location within Tokushima Prefecture Location within Japan
- 34°3′14.70″N 134°3′34.35″E
- Type: Buddhist temple ruins
- Location: Mima, Tokushima, Japan

History
- Built: Hakuhō period
- National Historic Site of Japan

The Kōzato temple ruins (郡里廃寺跡) is an archaeological site with the ruins of a Hakuhō period Buddhist temple in the Ganshoji, Ichogi neighborhood of the town of Mima, Tokushima Prefecture Japan. Its ruins were designated as a National Historic Site in 1976, with the area under protection extended in 1997. It is the oldest known Buddhist temple ruin in Tokushima Prefecture.

== History ==
The Kōzato temple ruins are located is located on the alluvial plain of the north bank of the middle reaches of the Yoshino River. The local place name of Rikko-ji (立光寺) is recorded from Edo Period records, and roof tiles which have subsequently been dated to the Nara period have been found in this area, indicating that a temple once existed. A large-scale archaeological excavation in 1967 found the foundation stones for the Kondō and Pagoda. From traces of a surrounding earthen palisade and moat, the temple compound was found to occupy an area 94 meters east-to-west by 120 meters north-to-south. The layout of the temple appears to be patterned after Hokki-ji in Ikaruga, Nara, with the Kondō on the right and the Pagoda on the left. The Pagoda foundations included an irregular octagonal stone with a diameter of over a meter, with a 13-centimeter center hole for the pagoda's main spar.

In addition to roof tiles, small pieces of bronze, Haji pottery, Sue pottery, and wooden tally boards have also been excavated from the temple area. There are plans to preserve the ruins as an archaeological park. The excavated roof tiles and other artifacts are stored and exhibited at the Mima Folk Museum and Tokushima Prefectural Museum, located on the precincts of Gansho-ji temple, about 300 meters from the site.

The site is a five-minute walk from the "Teramachi" bus stop on the municipal bus Sadamitsu Station on the JR Tokushima Line.

== See also ==
- List of Historic Sites of Japan (Tokushima)
