= Kan'on-ji =

Buddhist temple in Tokushima, Japan

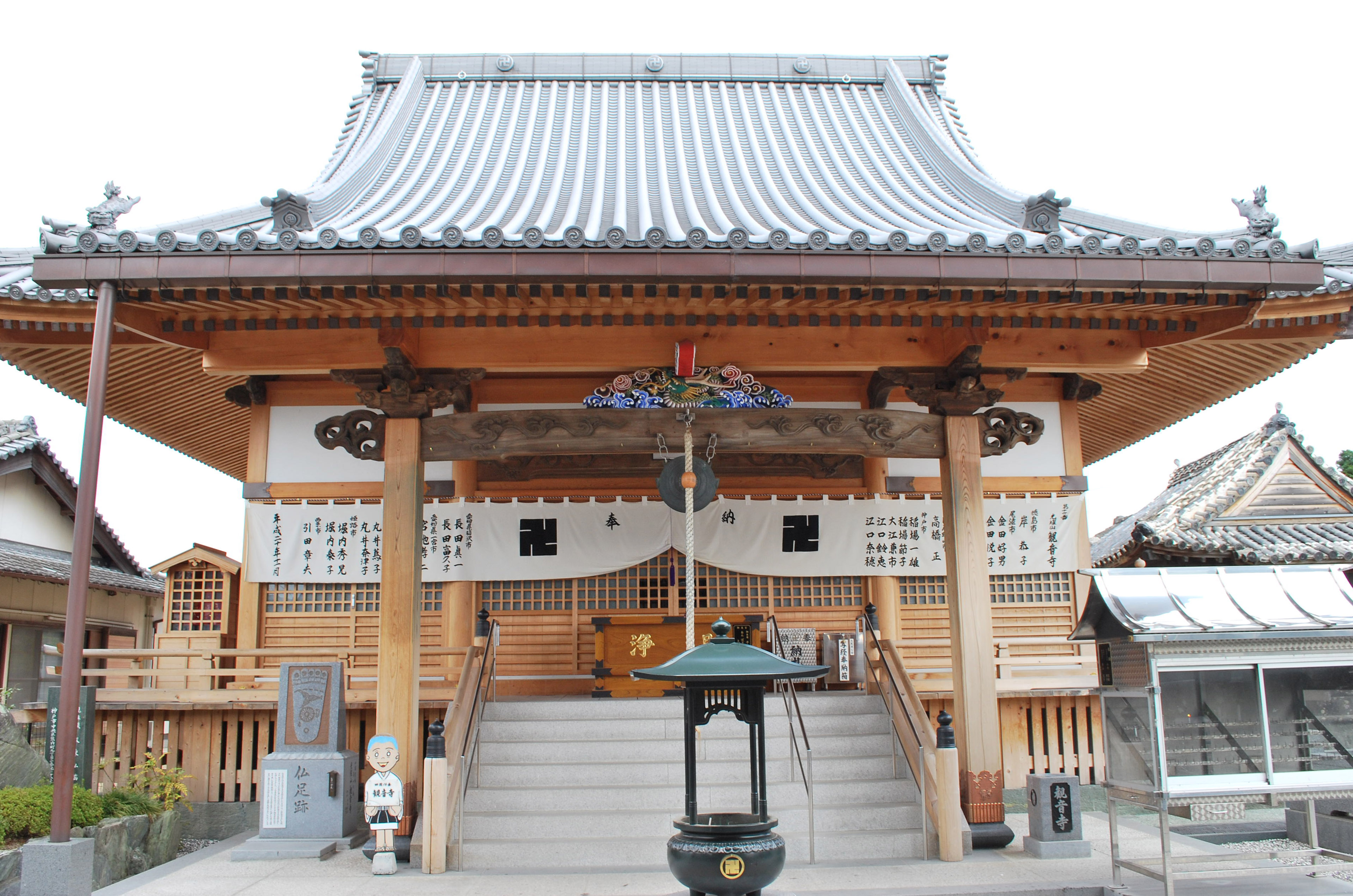
Main entrance

Kan'on-ji (Japanese: 観音寺) is a Koyasan Shingon temple in Tokushima, Tokushima Prefecture, Japan. It is Temple # 16 on the Shikoku 88 temple pilgrimage. The main image is of Senju Kannon (Guan Yin Boddhisattva, Sanskrit: Avalokitasvara or Avalokiteśvara).

== History ==
The temple was constructed during Emperor Shōmu's reign (701–756) as an imperial pilgrimage place. During the Tenshō (天正) era (1573–1592), the temple was destroyed by the forces of Chōsokabe Motochika (長宗我部 元親). In the Manji (万治) era (1658–1661), the temple was rebuilt with the support of the Hachisuka clan (蜂須賀氏).

== See also ==
- Shikoku 88 temple pilgrimage
