= Tokushima Castle =

- 徳島城
- Tokushima, Tokushima Prefecture, Japan
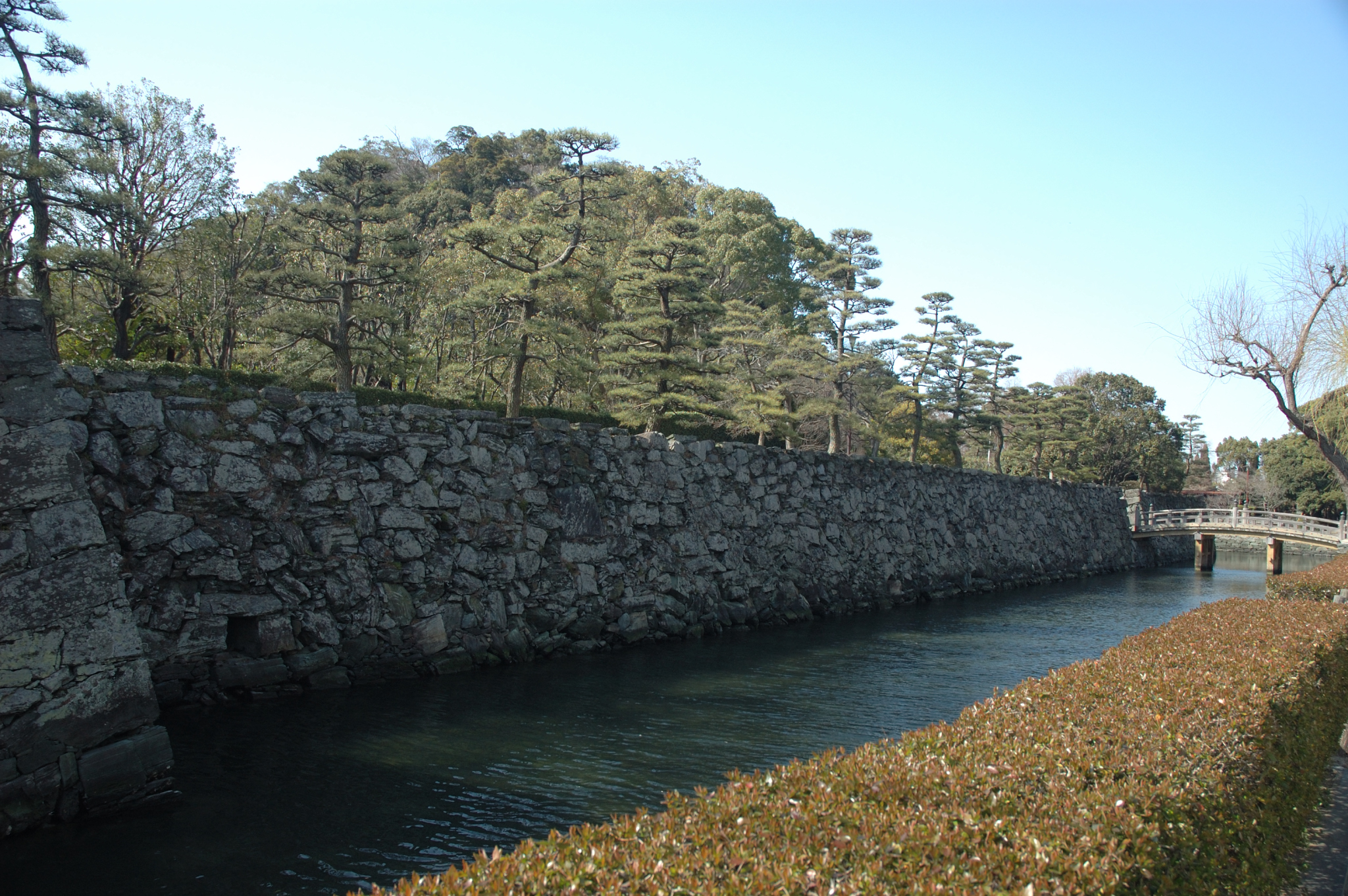
- Moat of the San-no-Maru enclosure

Site information
- Type: Japanese castle
- Condition: Ruins

Location
- Location within Tokushima Prefecture Location within Japan
- Coordinates: 34°4′30.69″N 134°33′18.99″E

Site history
- Built: 1601-1602
- Built by: Hachisuka Iemasa
- In use: 1601 to 1874
- Demolished: 1874
- National Historic Site of Japan National Place of Scenic Beauty

Tokushima Castle (徳島城, Tokushima-jō) was an Edo period Japanese castle located in the city of Tokushima, Tokushima Prefecture, Japan. Its ruins have been protected as a National Historic Site since 1957. Its Omotegoten Gardens are designated a national Place of Scenic Beauty.

== History ==
Tokushima Castle is located on the 60-meter high Shiroyama hill, in the center of Tokushima city at the mouth of the Yoshino River. Its location makes it the main gateway to Shikoku from the Kinai region. During the Muromachi period, the area was dominated by the local Miyoshi clan, who also controlled Kawachi Province across the Kii Channel. In 1582, the warlord Chōsokabe Motochika of Tosa Province attempted to united the island of Shikoku under his rule, and defeated the Miyoshi. However, he was in turn defeated by the forces of Toyotomi Hideyoshi only three years later in Hideyoshi's conquest of Shikoku. As Awa Province was directly opposite Hideyoshi's stronghold of Osaka, he placed Hachisuka Iemasa, the son of one of his most trusted generals, Hachisuka Masakatsu as governor. Masakatsu had originally been from Owari Province and had been one of Hideyoshi's closest confidants since an early age, participating at Hideyoshi's side through most of his campaigns, including the capture of Sanuki and Awa provinces. However, due to his advanced age, he turned the clan chieftainship to his son Iemasa.

Hachisuka Iemasa completed Tokushima Castle after about a year of construction. The site was a long and narrow ridge extending from east-to-west, with the central area over 150 meters long. As was typical for the Sengoku period, the castle originally consisted of a series of enclosures guarded by winding stone walls along the contours of the original terrain, and protected by masugata-style complex gates. Later, a three-story tenshu was added at the east edge of the hill. He also laid out the design of the castle town at the foot of the castle hill. Hachisuka Iemasa attempted to keep some distance from the Toyotomi government, as he did not get along with Ishida Mitsunari. He also married his son Hachisuka Yoshishige to an adopted daughter of Tokugawa Ieyasu. For these reasons, at the time of the Battle of Sekigahara, Ishida Mitsunari forced Hachisuka Iemasa to take the tonsure and forcibly exiled him to Mount Koya and the castle was occupied by troops from the Mōri clan. Following the establishment of the Tokugawa Shogunate Tokugawa Ieyasu restored the Hachisuka clan to their domains Hachisuka Yoshishige is therefore regarded as the first daimyō of Tokushima Domain. Hachisuka Yoshishige later received awards seven times from Shogun Tokugawa Hidetada for his actions at the 1614-1615 Battle of Osaka and his territories were expanded to cover all of Awa Province, as well as 70,000 koku in Awaji Province. In 1617, he was granted the remainder of Awaji Island, bringing his total kokudaka to 257,000 koku.

The castle remained the stronghold of the clan to the Meiji restoration. The Meiji government ordered the destruction of most of the castle structures in 1873, and by 1875 only one gate survived. Portions of the outer sections of the castle were sold to the public, or were used construct public facilities, such as schools and a prison. To commemorate the victory of Japan in the Russo-Japanese War in 1905 the remaining castle grounds were opened to the public as a park. The remaining one original gate of the old castle was destroyed during World War II on July 4, 1945. It was restored in 1989.

Tokushima Castle was listed as one of Japan's Top 100 Castles by the Japan Castle Foundation in 2006. The castle is a 15-minute walk from Tokushima Station.

== Gallery ==
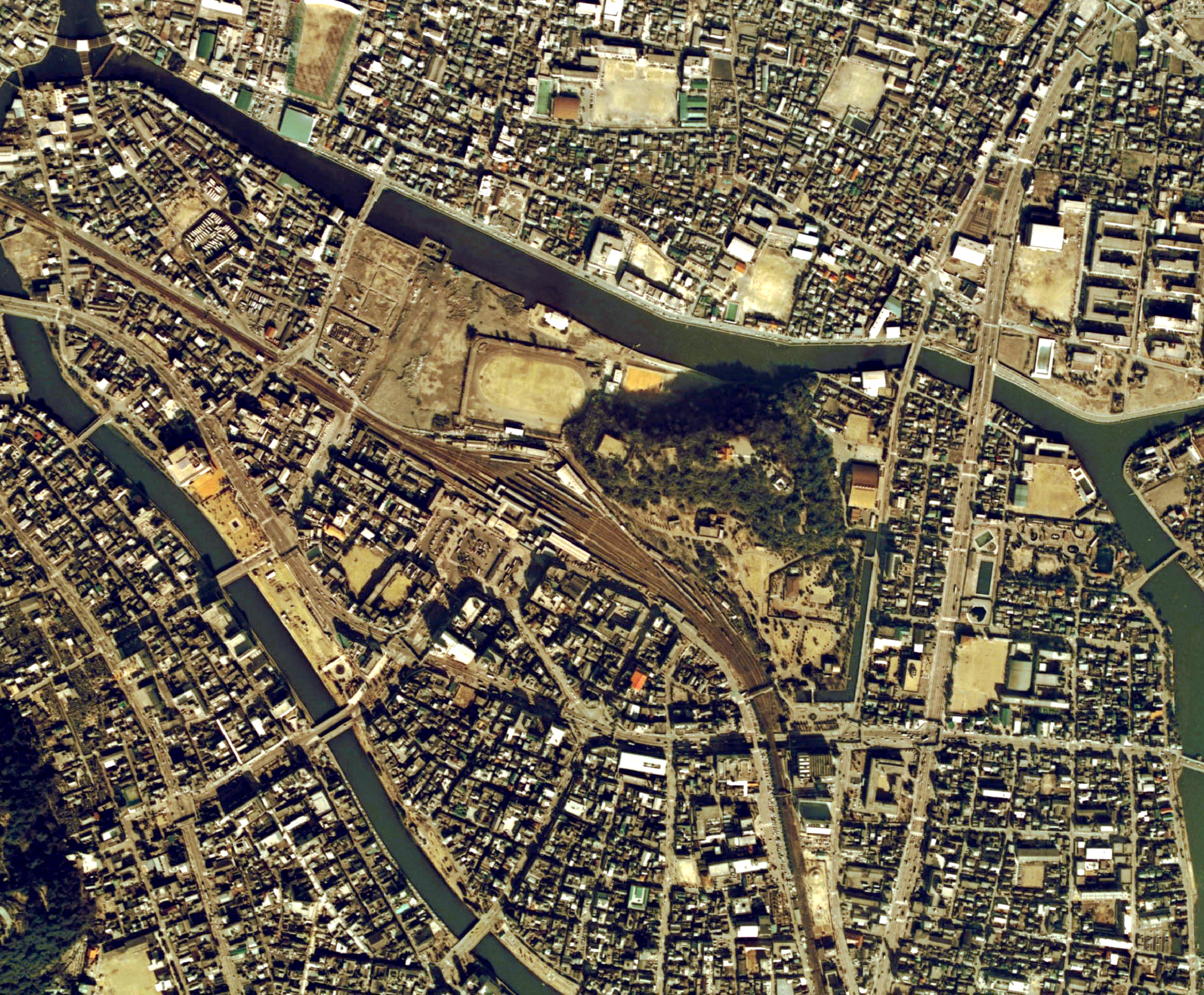
Aerial photograph taken in 1975

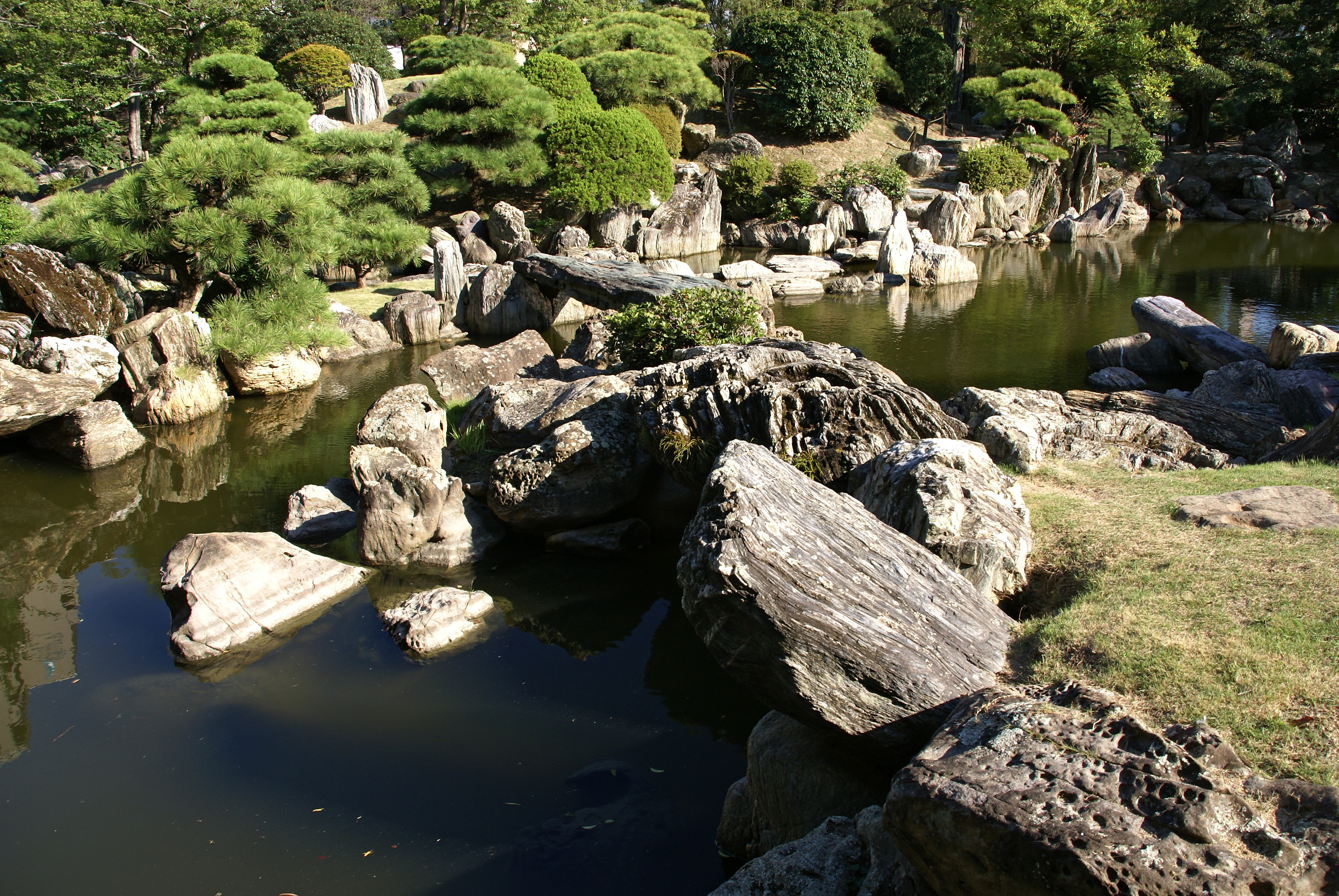
Omotegoten Gardens

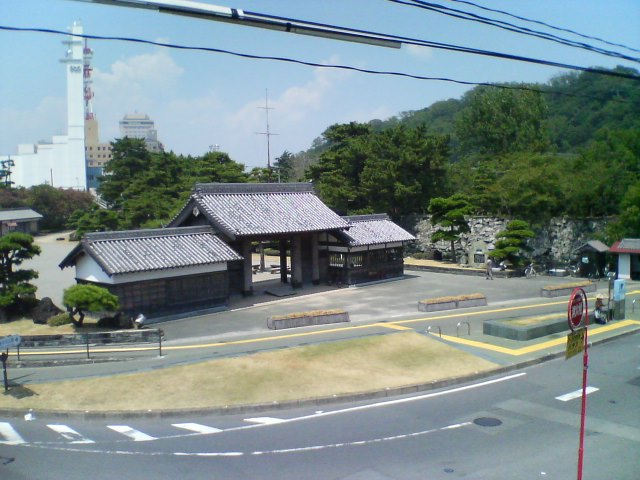
Reconstructed castle gate

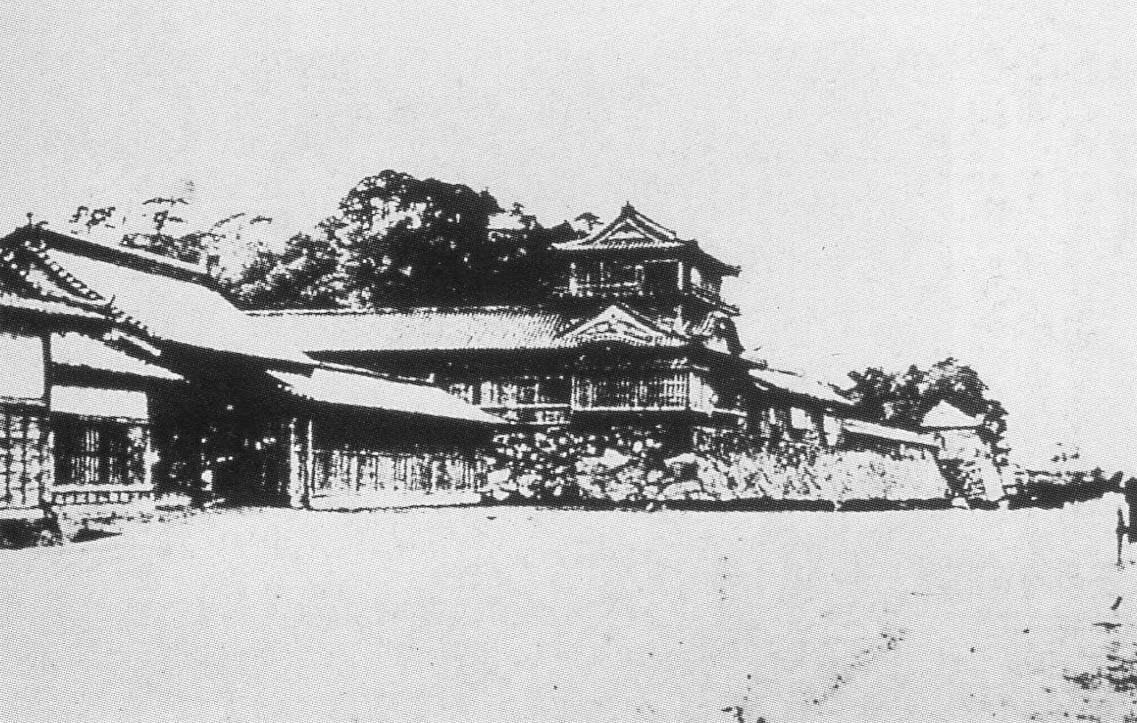
Bakumatsu period Tokushima Castle

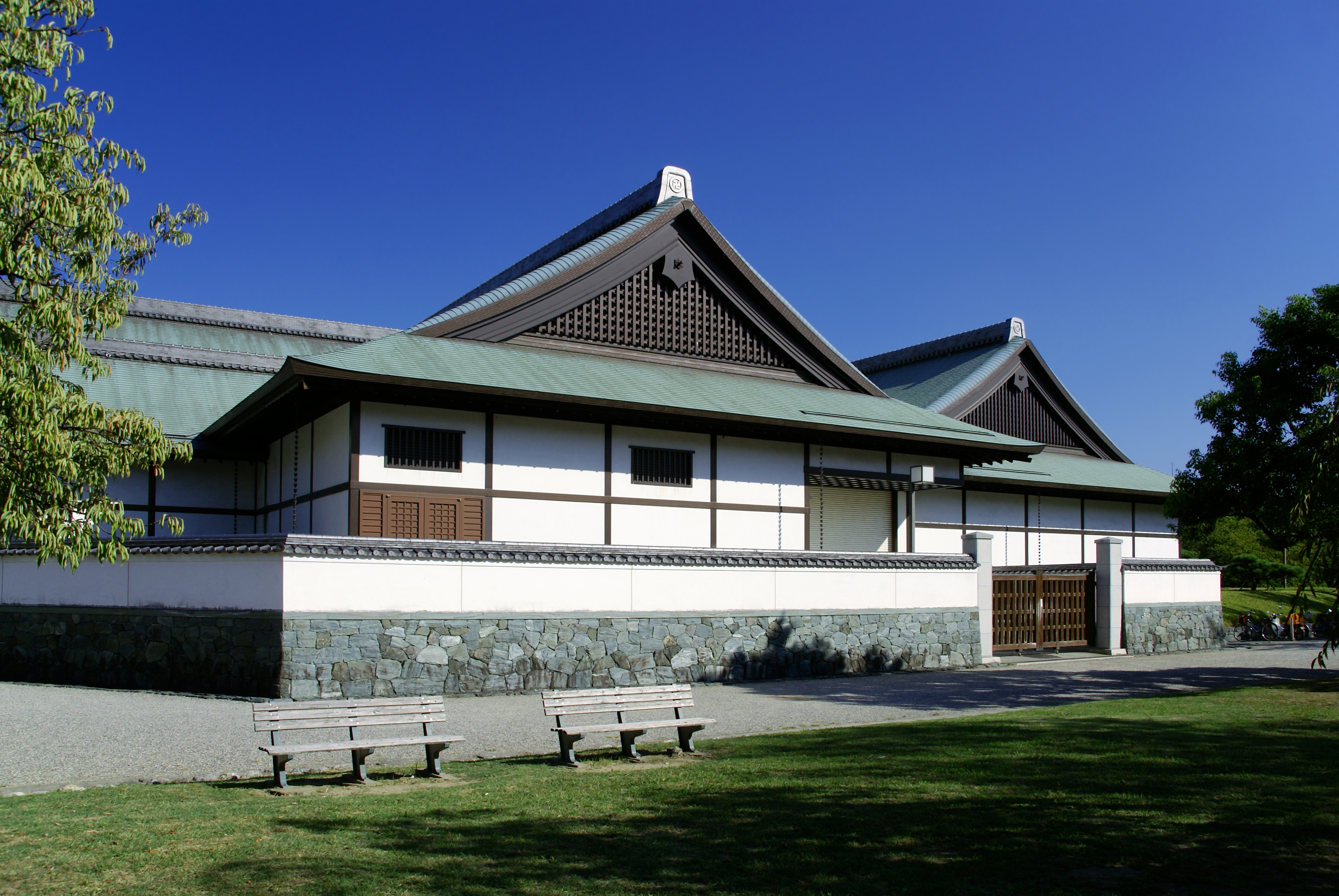
Tokushima Castle Museum

== See also ==
- List of Historic Sites of Japan (Tokushima)
- List of Places of Scenic Beauty of Japan (Tokushima)

== Literature ==
- Benesch, Oleg and Ran Zwigenberg (2019). Japan's Castles: Citadels of Modernity in War and Peace. Cambridge: Cambridge University Press. p. 374. ISBN 9781108481946.
- De Lange, William (2021). An Encyclopedia of Japanese Castles. Groningen: Toyo Press. pp. 600 pages. ISBN 978-9492722300.
