= Tairyūji =

Koyasan Shingon temple in Anan, Tokushima, Japan

Coordinates: 33.8825°N 134.5218°E

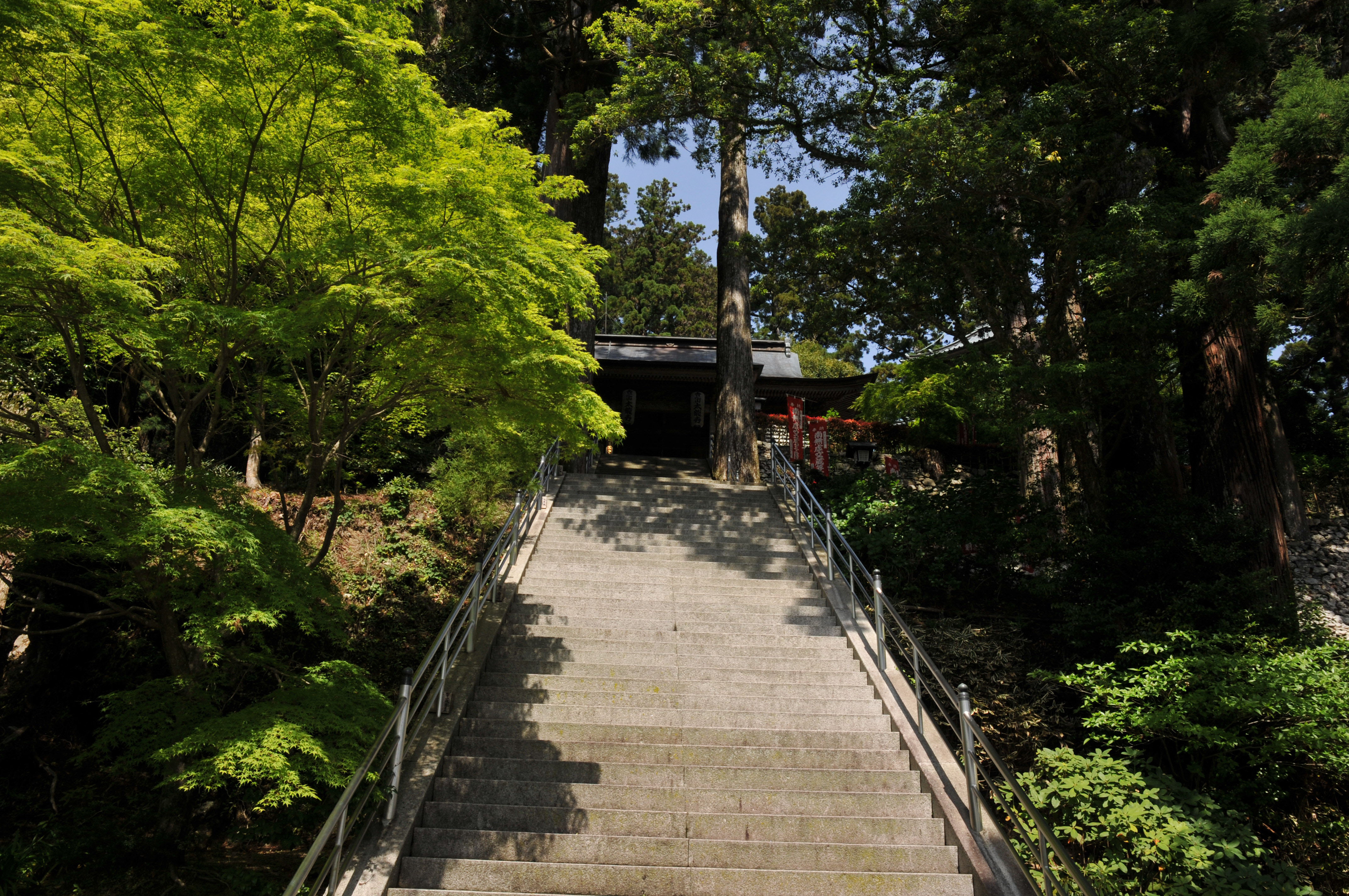

Tairyūji or Tairyū-ji (Tairyū Temple, Great Dragon Temple) (Japanese: 太龍寺) is a Koyasan Shingon temple in Anan city, Tokushima Prefecture, Japan. Temple # 21 on the Shikoku 88 temple pilgrimage. The main image is of Ākāśagarbha Bodhisattva.

== History ==
- The temple was constructed during Emperor Kanmu's era.
- In the Tenshō (天正, 1573-1592) era, the temple was destroyed by Chōsokabe Motochika (長宗我部 元親) force.
- In the Edo era, the temple was rebuilt with the support of Hachisuka clan (蜂須賀氏).
- Typhoon No. 6 in July 2011 caused a 400-year-old cedar tree to break and broke through the main hall roof.

== Cultural properties ==
Following structures in the temple were designated as Tangible Cultural Properties of Japan on June 21, 2013:

- Main Hall: built in 1852
- Kōbō-Daishi Hall: built in 1877
- Hexagon Sutra Hall: built in 1856
- Treasure Stupa: built in 1861
- Entrance Gate: built 1806
- Bell Tower Gate: built in 1903

== See also ==
- Shikoku 88 temple pilgrimage
