= Tokushima (city) =

Tokushima 徳島市
- Prefecture capital and City
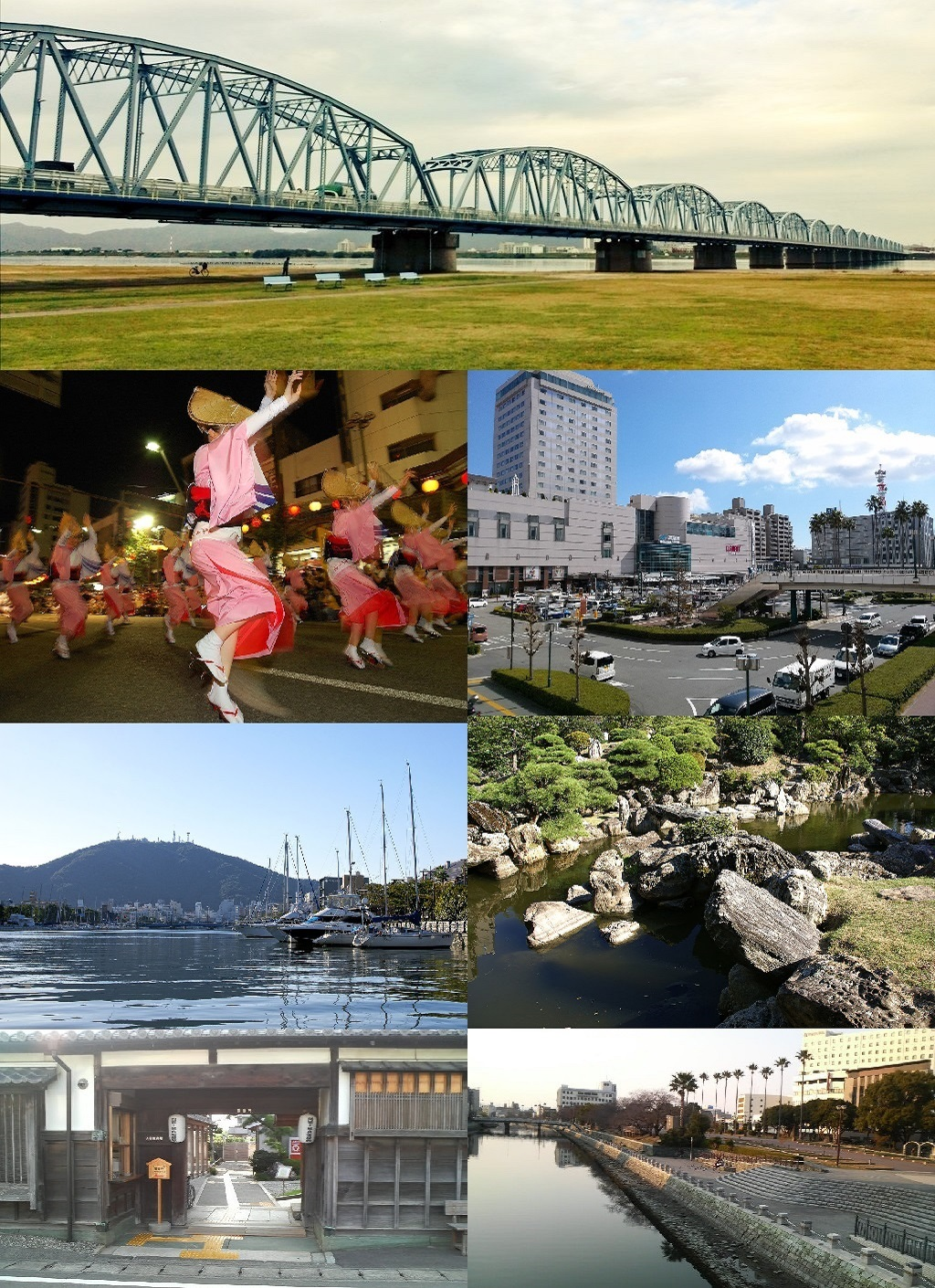
- Left to right from top: Yoshinogawa Bridge, Awa Odori in August, Tokushima Station, Mount Bizan, Senshukaku Garden at Tokushima Castle, Awa Jūrōbei House, Aibahama Park

- Flag Seal
- Location of Tokushima in Tokushima Prefecture
- Coordinates: 34°4′N 134°33′E
- Country: Japan
- Region: Shikoku
- Prefecture: Tokushima
- City Status: October 1, 1889

Government
  - Mayor: Akiyoshi Endō

Area
  - Total: 191.52 km^{2} (73.95 sq mi)

Population (September 1, 2024)
  - Total: 245,264
  - Density: 1,280/km^{2} (3,300/sq mi)
- Time zone: UTC+9 (JST)
- Symbols
  - Tree: Elaeocarpus sylvestris
  - Flower: Prunus serrulata
- Phone number: 088-621-5111
- Address: 2-5 Saiwaichō, Tokushima-shi, Tokushima-ken 770-8571
- Website: Official website

Tokushima (徳島市, Tokushima-shi; Japanese pronunciation: [tò̞.kɯ̥̈.ɕì.mä̀, -ɕí.mä̀, -ɕí.mä́.ɕì]) is the capital city of Tokushima Prefecture on Shikoku island in Japan. As of 1 September 2024, the city had an estimated population of 245,264 in 122,539 households and a population density of 1,280 persons per km². The total area of the city is 191.52 square kilometres (73.95 sq mi).

== Geography ==
The city is situated in the north-eastern part of Tokushima Prefecture at the mouth of the Yoshino River. In terms of layout and organization, Tokushima displays the typical characteristics of a Japanese castle town. Most of the city is located in the Tokushima plain and is flat, but the symbol of the city, Mt. Bizan, rises in the center, creating a scenic landscape. The southern part is a mountainous area with forests.

=== Mountains ===
Name	Height	Notes
Bizan (眉山)	277 m	
Shiroyama (城山)	62 m	
Nakatsu Mineyama (中津峰山)	773 m	The highest mountain in the Tokushima City district.
Nishi Ryuo-san (西竜王山)	495 m	
Higashi Ryuo-san (東龍王山)	408m	
Kinobeyama (気延山)	212 m	
Bentenyama (弁天山)	6.1 m	Claimed to be the smallest natural mountain in Japan.

=== Rivers ===
- Akui River
- Imagire River
- Shinmachi River
- Suketō River
- Yoshino River

=== Neighbouring municipalities ===
Tokushima Prefecture

- Aizumi
- Ishii
- Kamiyama
- Katsuura
- Kitajima
- Komatsushima
- Matsushige
- Sanagōchi

== Demographics ==
Per Japanese census data, the population of Tokushima has been growing steadily for the past century.

Historical population
Year	Pop.	±%
1920	140,534	—
1930	158,688	+12.9%
1940	164,572	+3.7%
1950	177,363	+7.8%
1960	203,326	+14.6%
1970	223,451	+9.9%
1980	249,343	+11.6%
1990	263,356	+5.6%
2000	268,218	+1.8%
2010	264,764	−1.3%

== Climate ==
Tokushima has a humid subtropical climate (Köppen climate classification Cfa) with hot summers and cool winters. Precipitation is high, but there is a pronounced difference between the wetter summers and drier winters.

Climate data for Tokushima (1991−2020 normals, extremes 1891−present)
Month	Jan	Feb	Mar	Apr	May	Jun	Jul	Aug	Sep	Oct	Nov	Dec	Year
Record high °C (°F)	22.5 (72.5)	23.2 (73.8)	28.0 (82.4)	30.1 (86.2)	32.9 (91.2)	36.2 (97.2)	38.4 (101.1)	38.2 (100.8)	36.2 (97.2)	33.4 (92.1)	27.1 (80.8)	26.7 (80.1)	38.4 (101.1)
Mean maximum °C (°F)	15.5 (59.9)	18.0 (64.4)	21.4 (70.5)	25.5 (77.9)	29.0 (84.2)	32.1 (89.8)	34.9 (94.8)	35.9 (96.6)	33.0 (91.4)	28.6 (83.5)	23.3 (73.9)	18.8 (65.8)	36.2 (97.2)
Mean daily maximum °C (°F)	10.0 (50.0)	10.8 (51.4)	14.3 (57.7)	19.6 (67.3)	24.0 (75.2)	26.8 (80.2)	30.6 (87.1)	32.3 (90.1)	28.5 (83.3)	23.1 (73.6)	17.7 (63.9)	12.5 (54.5)	20.9 (69.6)
Daily mean °C (°F)	6.3 (43.3)	6.8 (44.2)	9.9 (49.8)	15.0 (59.0)	19.6 (67.3)	23.0 (73.4)	26.8 (80.2)	28.1 (82.6)	24.8 (76.6)	19.3 (66.7)	13.8 (56.8)	8.7 (47.7)	16.8 (62.2)
Mean daily minimum °C (°F)	2.9 (37.2)	3.1 (37.6)	5.8 (42.4)	10.6 (51.1)	15.6 (60.1)	19.8 (67.6)	23.9 (75.0)	24.9 (76.8)	21.6 (70.9)	15.9 (60.6)	10.1 (50.2)	5.2 (41.4)	13.3 (55.9)
Mean minimum °C (°F)	−0.9 (30.4)	−0.7 (30.7)	1.0 (33.8)	4.7 (40.5)	10.5 (50.9)	15.9 (60.6)	20.6 (69.1)	21.8 (71.2)	16.9 (62.4)	10.6 (51.1)	4.8 (40.6)	0.7 (33.3)	−1.5 (29.3)
Record low °C (°F)	−5.4 (22.3)	−6.0 (21.2)	−3.6 (25.5)	−0.7 (30.7)	4.6 (40.3)	9.7 (49.5)	15.3 (59.5)	16.6 (61.9)	11.9 (53.4)	4.5 (40.1)	−1.3 (29.7)	−4.3 (24.3)	−6.0 (21.2)
Average precipitation mm (inches)	41.9 (1.65)	53.0 (2.09)	87.8 (3.46)	104.3 (4.11)	146.6 (5.77)	192.6 (7.58)	177.0 (6.97)	193.0 (7.60)	271.2 (10.68)	199.5 (7.85)	89.2 (3.51)	63.9 (2.52)	1,619.9 (63.78)
Average snowfall cm (inches)	1 (0.4)	1 (0.4)	0 (0)	0 (0)	0 (0)	0 (0)	0 (0)	0 (0)	0 (0)	0 (0)	0 (0)	0 (0)	2 (0.8)
Average precipitation days (≥ 0.5 mm)	6.5	7.1	10.3	10.1	9.7	13.2	11.2	9.0	11.4	9.4	7.7	6.5	112.2
Average relative humidity (%)	61	61	61	62	67	75	77	73	72	69	66	63	67
Mean monthly sunshine hours	160.3	152.5	179.8	197.9	205.7	151.9	192.0	230.6	162.0	163.6	150.4	160.1	2,106.8
Source: Japan Meteorological Agency

== History ==
As with all of Tokushima Prefecture, the area of Tokushima was part of ancient Awa Province. Tokushima was developed around Tokushima Castle, the seat of the Hachisuka clan, daimyo of Tokushima Domain under the Edo Period Tokugawa shogunate. Its prosperity was built on a strong indigo dye industry. Following the Meiji restoration, the city of Tokushima was established on October 1, 1889 with the creation of the modern municipalities system. At the time, it was the 10th largest city in Japan.

=== World War II air raid ===
Tokushima was selected as a target by the United States' XXI Bomber Command during World War II because of the city's role as an agricultural center for the region. On July 3, 1945, at 5:45 PM (JST) 137 aircraft took off to bomb Tokushima. 1,050 tons of incendiary bombs were dropped on Tokushima, destroying 74% of the built up areas of the city. Over 1000 people were killed in the bombing (431 men, 553 women, 17 of unknown gender) and over 2000 people were injured. The number of incendiary bombs dropped on Tokushima City was calculated to be 354,664.

== Government ==
Tokushima has a mayor-council form of government with a directly elected mayor and a unicameral city council of 30 members. Tokushima contributes ten members to the Tokushima Prefectural Assembly. In terms of national politics, the city is part of Tokushima 1st district of the lower house of the Diet of Japan.

== Economy ==
Tokushima has been the economic center of eastern Shikoku since the Edo period, when prospered as a distribution center for indigo and timber, and was one of the leading commercial cities in Japan. It has a deep connection with the Kansai region especially Osaka, which has become even more prominent in modern times after the opening of the Akashi Kaikyo Bridge. Following the decline of the indigo industry, the accumulated wealth of the merchant class led to the development of banks and financial institutions, which in turn led to modern industries such as spinning, papermaking, pharmaceuticals, food processing and electric power. Although the city area was burnt to the ground due to the Tokushima air raid in World War II, it was quickly reconstructed. There are numerous industrial parks.

Agriculture and forestry both remain as major contributors the local economy. The Tokushima Plain in the Yoshino and Katsuura river basins have fertile agricultural land, and in addition to rice, some items such as cauliflower and carrots are major local products.

== Education ==
=== Universities and colleges ===
- Shikoku University
- Tokushima Bunri University
- University of Tokushima

== Primary and secondary education ==
Tokushima has 30 public elementary schools and 18 public middle schools operated by the city government and nine public high schools operated by the Tokushima Prefectural Department of Education. There are also one private elementary school, three private middle schools and five private high schools. The prefecture also operates one night school and four special education schools for the disabled.

== Transportation ==
=== Airport ===
- Tokushima Airport, which is located in neighboring town of Matsushige

=== Railway ===
Shikoku Railway Company – Kōtoku Line

- Tokushima - Sako - Yoshinari

Shikoku Railway Company – Mugi Line

- Tokushima - Awa-Tomida - Niken'ya - Bunkanomori - Jizōbashi

Shikoku Railway Company – Tokushima Line

- Sako - Kuramoto - Akui - Kō

=== Highways ===
- Tokushima Expressway
- Tokushima-Nanbu Expressway
- National Route 11
- National Route 28
- National Route 55
- National Route 192
- National Route 195
- National Route 318
- National Route 438
- National Route 439

== Sister cities ==
- Saginaw, Michigan, United States, since December 1961
- Leiria, Portugal, since October 1969
- Dandong, Liaoning, China, since October 1991

== Local attractions ==
- Awa Kokubun-ji, 15th temple on the Shikoku Pilgrimage
- Dainichi-ji, 13th temple on the Shikoku Pilgrimage
- Ichinomiya Jinja, one of the ichinomiya of former Awa Province
- Ido-ji, 17th temple on the Shikoku Pilgrimage
- Jōraku-ji, 14th temple on the Shikoku Pilgrimage
- Kan'on-ji, 16th temple on the Shikoku Pilgrimage
- Shibunomaruyama Kofun, National Historic Site
- Tokushima Archaeological Museum
- Tokushima Castle
- Tokushima Castle Museum
- Tokushima Domain Hachisuka clan cemetery, National Historic Site
- Tokushima Prefectural Museum

== Culture ==
Every August, during the Obon Festival, Tokushima holds a cultural dance festival, the Awa Odori. Awa Odori literally translates as "Awa Dance" (Awa being Tokushima Prefecture's ancient name). During the festival, residents ranging from young children to professional dance troupes perform a distinctive style of Japanese traditional dance in regional costumes, accompanied by strings, drums, and singing (usually by the dancers themselves).

== Sports ==
The city's Asty Tokushima arena hosted the official 2007 Asian Basketball Championship.

== Gallery ==
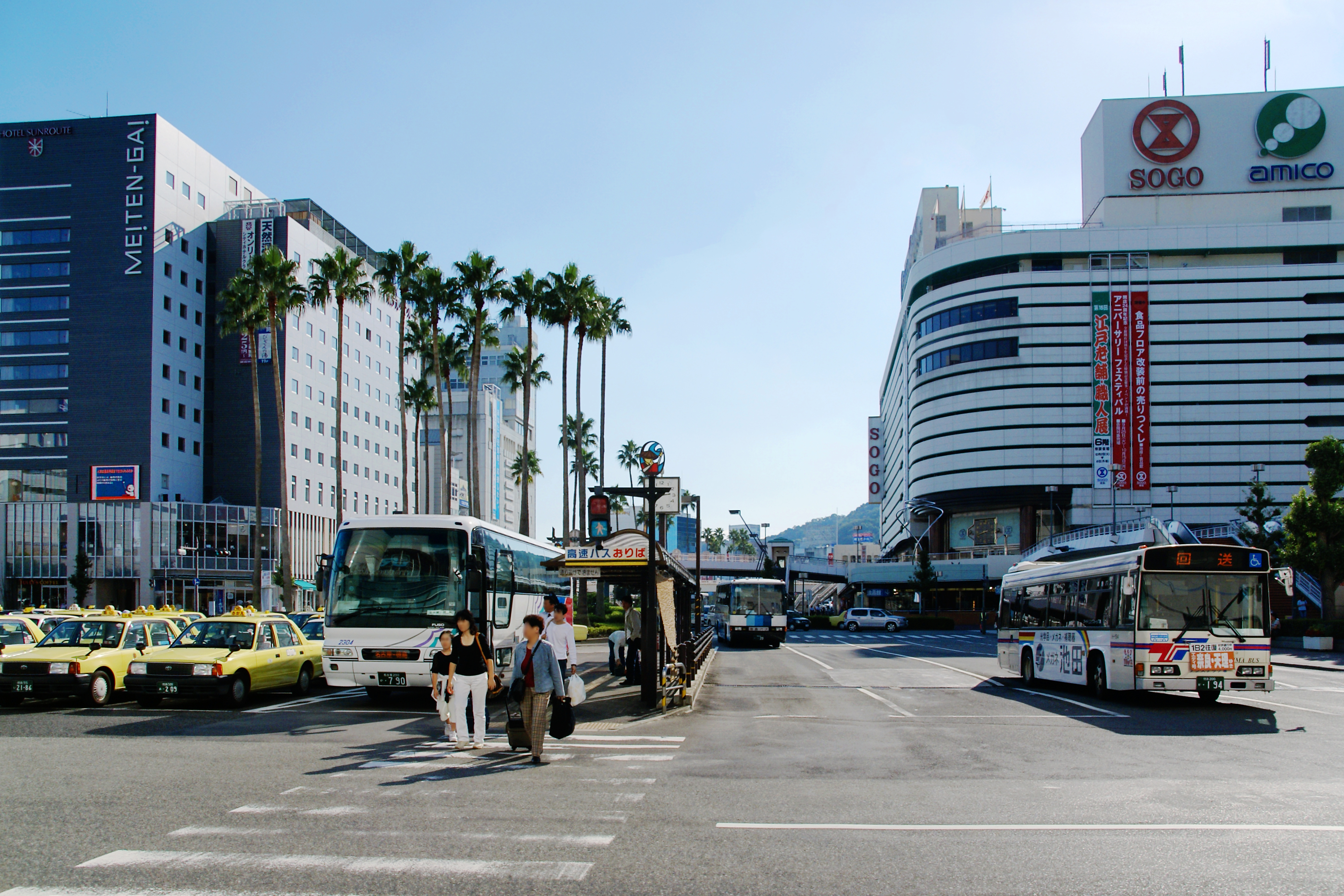
Tokushima Station Bus Terminal

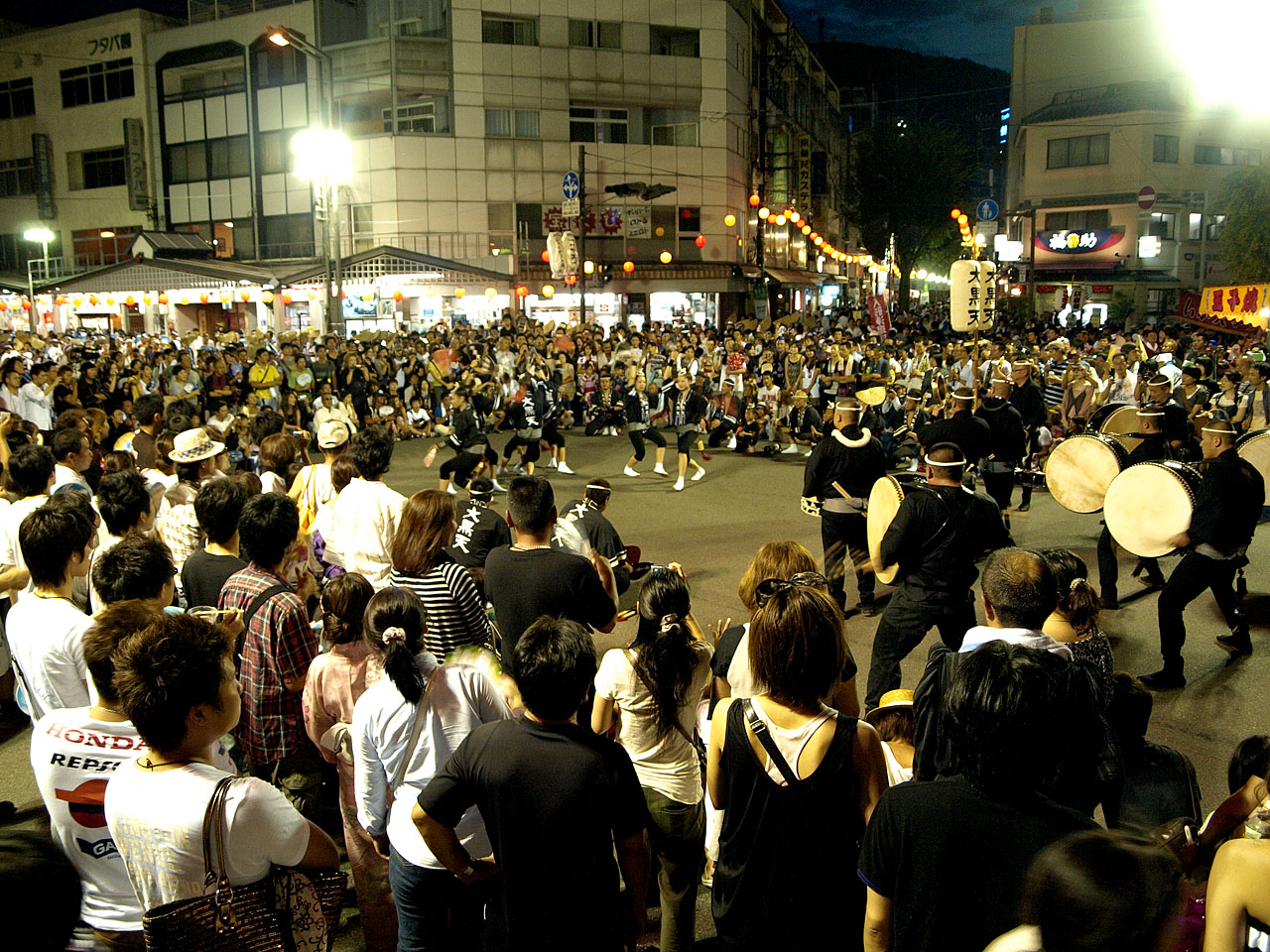
Awa Dancing Festival, well-known Bon Festival

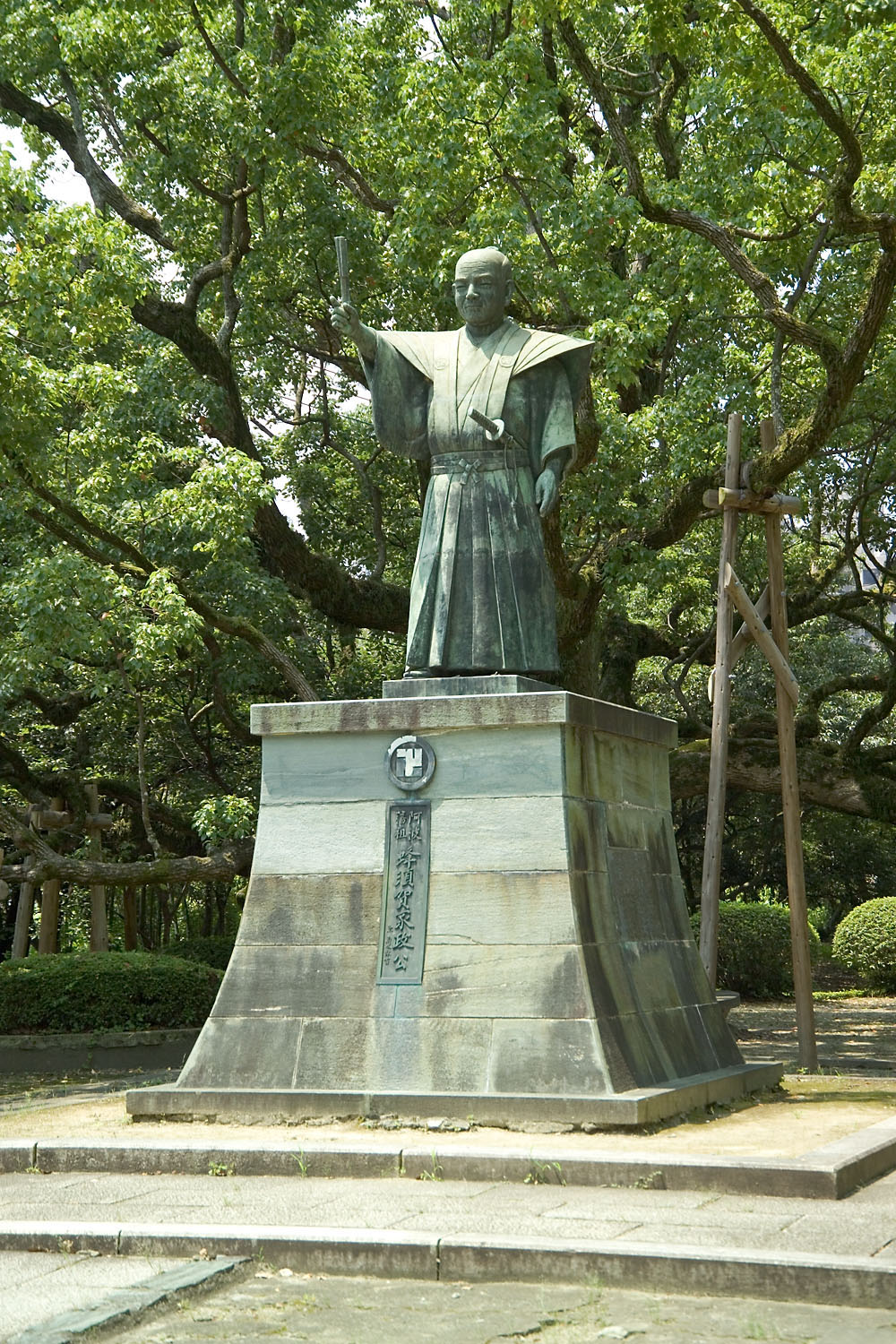
statue of Hachisuka Iemasa
