= Awa Kokubun-ji (Tokushima) =

- 阿波国分寺
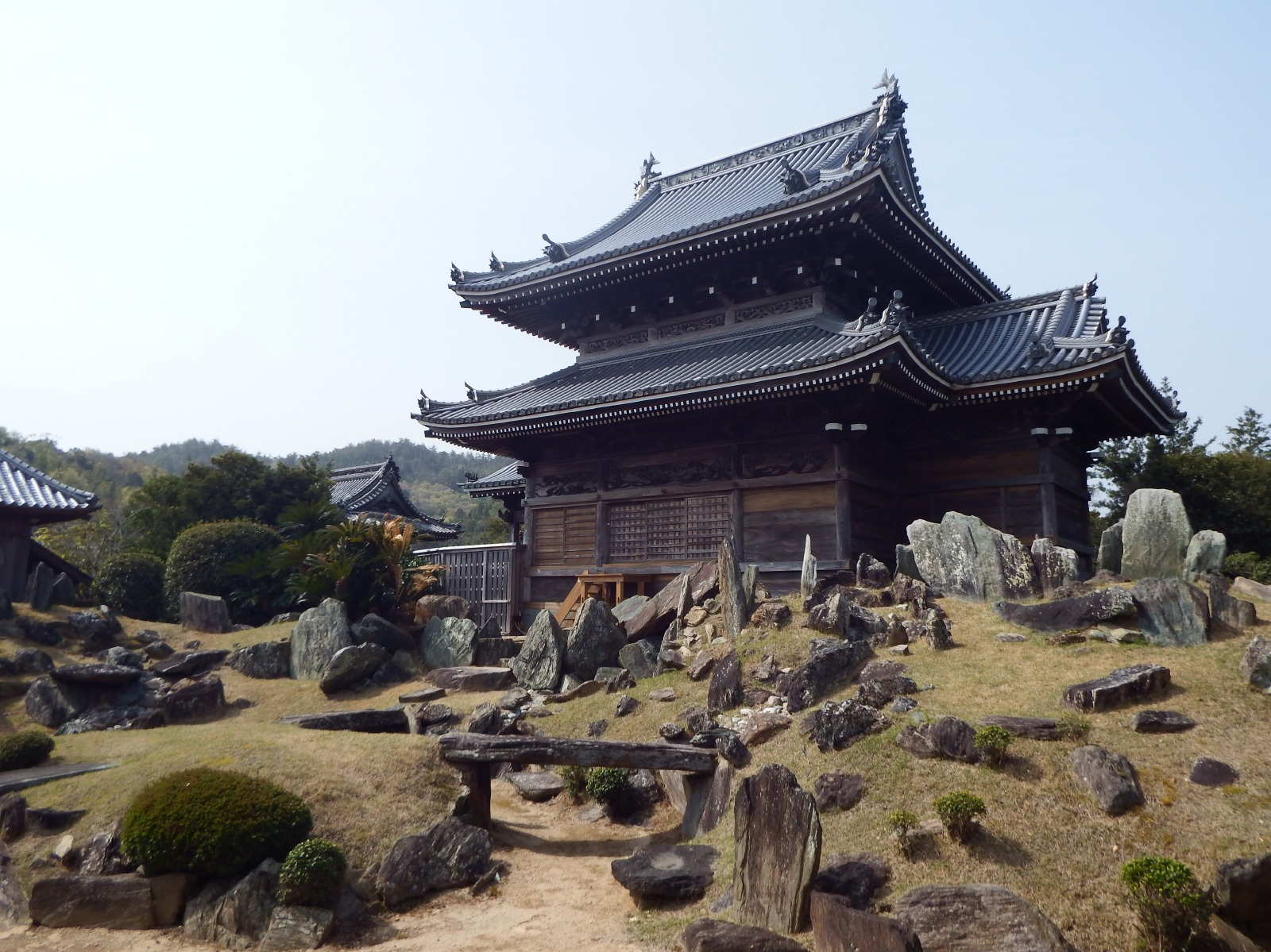

Religion
- Affiliation: Buddhism
- Sect: Sōtō Zen
- Deity: Yakushi Nyorai
- Rite: Mantra: On korokoro sendari matōgi sowaka

Location
- Location: Tokushima, Tokushima
- Country: Japan
- Interactive map of Awa Kokubun-ji
- Coordinates: 34°3′20.2″N 134°28′25″E

Architecture
- Founder: Gyōki (by tradition)
- Completed: 815

Awa Kokubun-ji (阿波国分寺) is a Sōtō Zen Buddhist temple in Tokushima, Tokushima. It is the 15th temple of the Shikoku Pilgrimage.

== History ==
Awa Kokubun-ji is the Kokubun-ji (provincial temples, one in each province of Japan) for Awa Province. Gyōki is said to have carved the principal image of Yakushi Nyorai. These temples were designated by Emperor Shōmu. It was originally of the Hosso sect, but changed to the Shingon sect when Kukai visited the temple. Later, it became part of the Sōtō Zen sect.

Nearby is the Awa Kokubunni-ji ruins, the site of a nunnery also established as part of Emperor Shōmu's efforts.

== Cultural Properties ==
The temple's garden is a Nationally Designated Cultural Property.
