= List of Buddhist temples in Japan =

This is a list of Buddhist temples, monasteries, stupas, and pagodas in Japan for which there are Wikipedia articles, sorted by prefecture.

== Aichi ==
- Nittai-ji
- Ōsu Kannon

== Chiba ==
- Wat Paknam Japan

== Ehime ==
- Kanjizai-ji

== Fukui ==
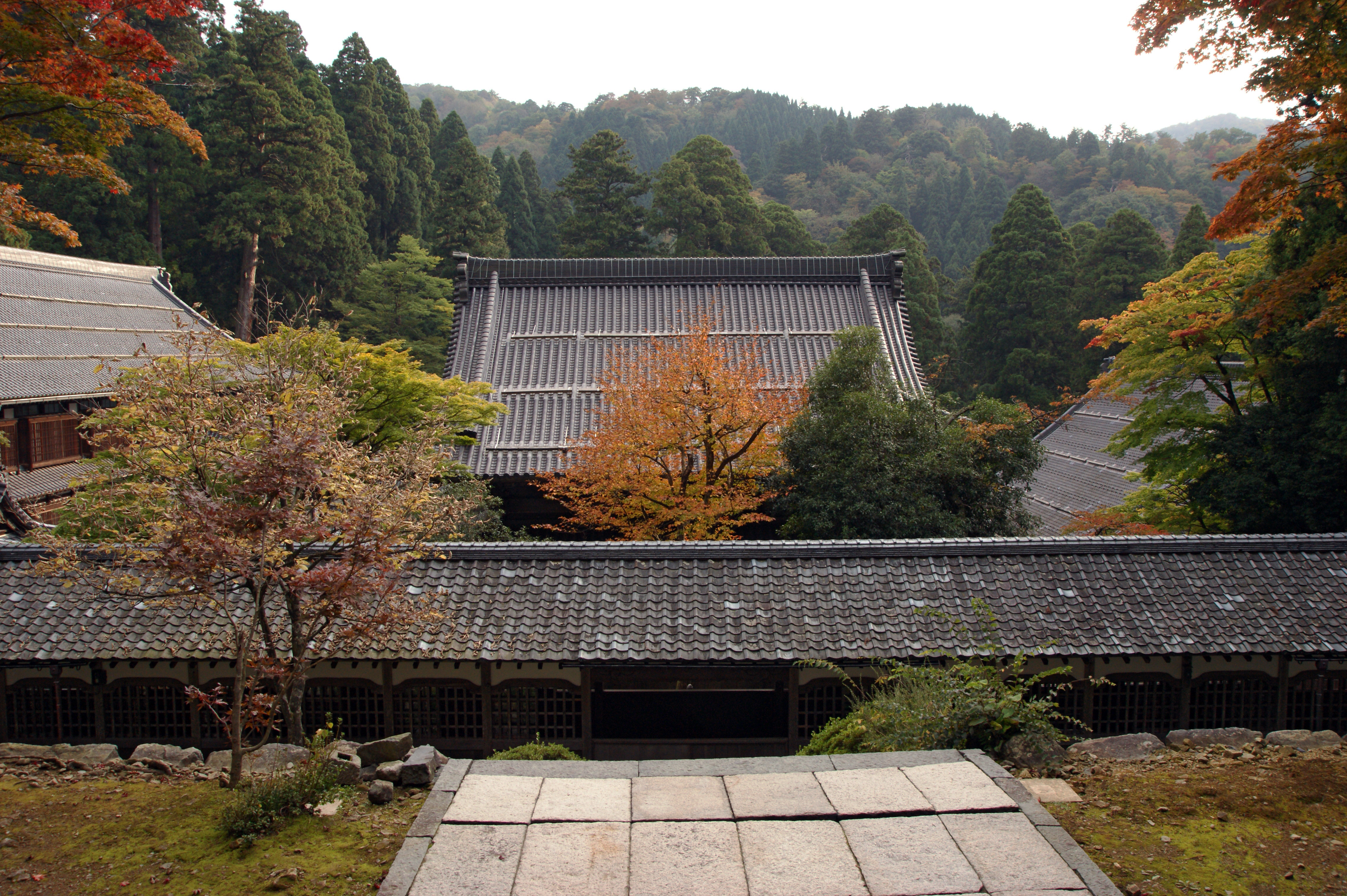
Eihei-ji in Eiheiji, Fukui

- Eihei-ji

== Fukuoka ==
- Nanzoin
- Shōfuku-ji
- Jōten-ji

== Fukushima ==
- Enichi-ji

== Gifu ==
- Eihō-ji
- Shōgen-ji
- Shōhō-ji

== Hiroshima ==
- Ankoku-ji
- Buttsū-ji
- Myōō-in

== Hyōgo ==
- Antai-ji
- Chōkō-ji
- Engyō-ji
- Hōrin-ji
- Hōun-ji
- Ichijō-ji
- Jōdo-ji in Ono
- Kakurin-ji in Kakogawa
- Sagami-ji
- Taisan-ji in Kobe

== Iwate ==
- Chūson-ji
- Mōtsū-ji

== Kagawa ==
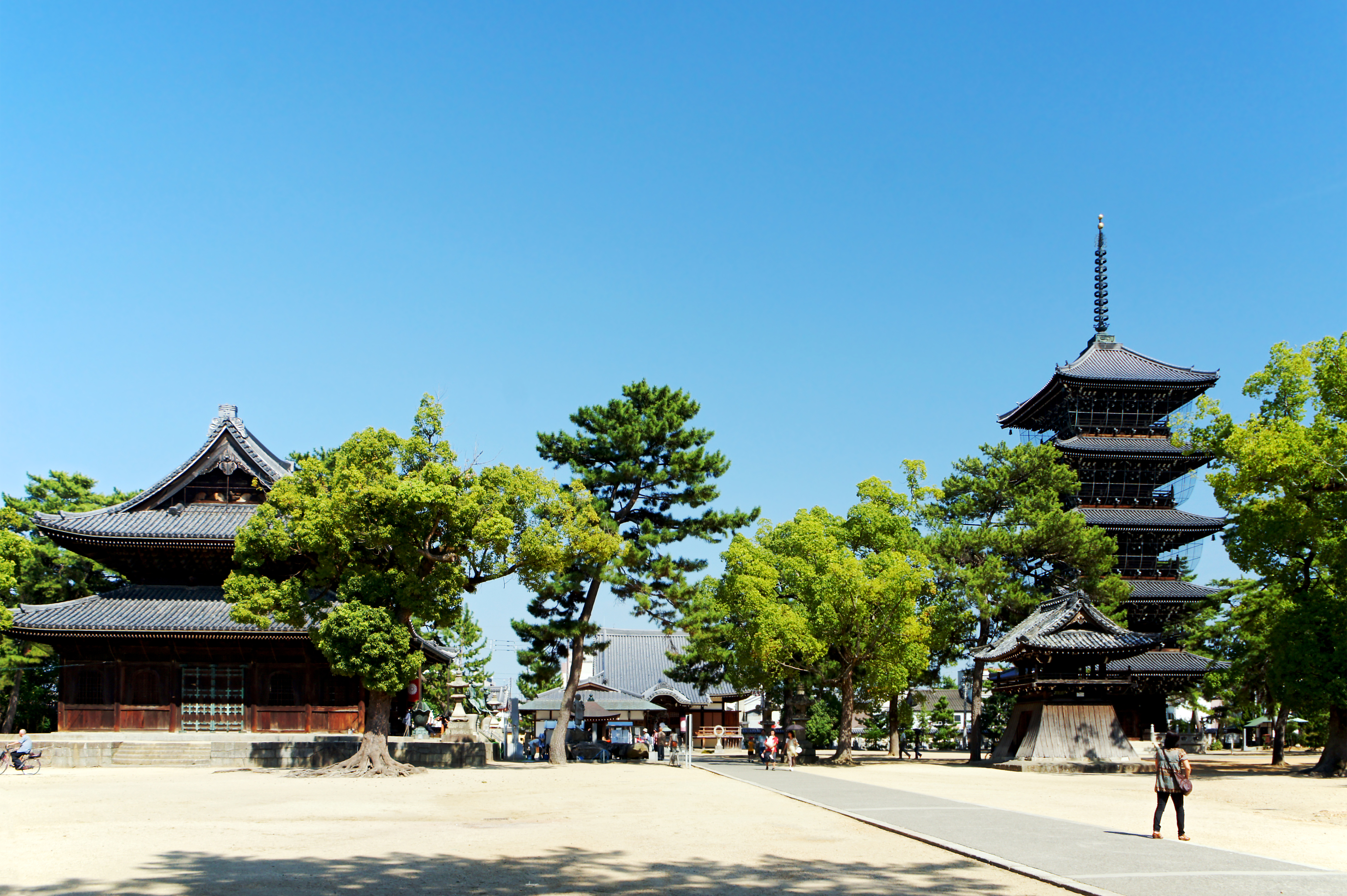
Zentsū-ji (Kūkai's birthplace)

- Motoyama-ji
- Ōkubo-ji
- Sanuki Kokubun-ji
- Yashima-ji
- Zentsū-ji

== Kanagawa ==
- Engaku-ji
- Hōkoku-ji
- Kenchō-ji
- Kōtoku-in
- Sōji-ji

== Kōchi ==
- Chikurin-ji
- Dainichi-ji
- Hotsumisaki-ji
- Kongōchō-ji
- Kōnomine-ji
- Shinshō-ji
- Tosa_Kokubun-ji
- Zenjibu-ji
- Zenrakuji

== Kyoto ==
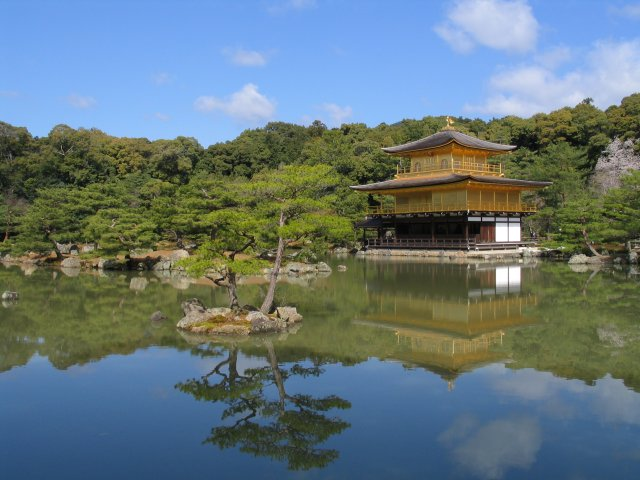
Kinkaku-ji (Rinzai-Shōkoku-ji sect), the Temple of the Golden Pavilion, located in Kyoto. It was built in Muromachi period.

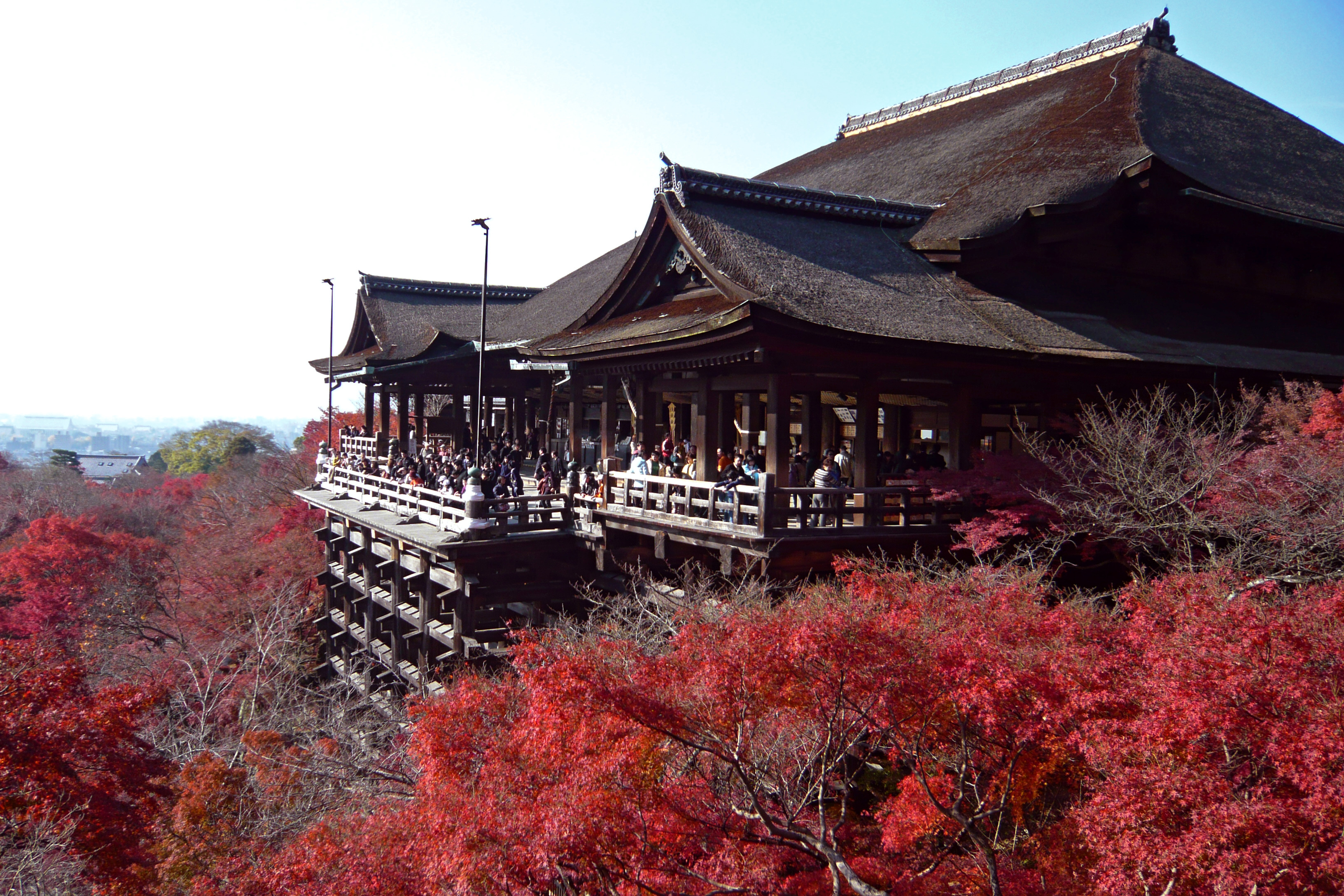
Kiyomizu-dera in Kyoto, Kyoto

- Adashino Nenbutsu-ji
- Byōdō-in
- Chion-in (Head temple of the Jōdo-shū Buddhist sect)
- Daigo-ji
- Daikaku-ji
- Daitoku-ji
- Eikan-dō Zenrin-ji (Head temple of the Seizan branch of Jōdo-shū)
- Ginkaku-ji (Temple of the Silver Pavilion)
- Higashi-Honganji (Head temple of the Ōtani-ha branch within the Jōdo Shinshū school)
- Kinkaku-ji (Rokuonji, Deer Garden Temple, Temple of the Golden Pavilion)
- Kiyomizu-dera
- Kōdai-ji
- Kōzan-ji
- Manpuku-ji (Ōbaku temple at Uji)
- Myōshin-ji
- Nanzen-ji
- Ninna-ji
- Nishi-Honganji (Head temple of the Honganji-ha branch within the Jōdo Shinshū school)
- Ryōan-ji
- Saihō-ji
- Sanjūsangen-dō
- Shinnyō-ji
- Tenryū-ji (major temple of the Rinzai school)
- Tōfuku-ji
  - Manju-ji
- Tō-ji

== Mie ==
- Honzan Senju-ji (Head temple of the Takada branch within the Jōdo Shinshū school)

== Miyagi ==
- Zuigan-ji

== Nagano ==
- Anraku-ji
- Zenkō-ji

== Nagasaki ==
- Fukusai-ji
- Sōfuku-ji in Nagasaki

== Nagoya ==
- Arako Kannon

== Nara ==
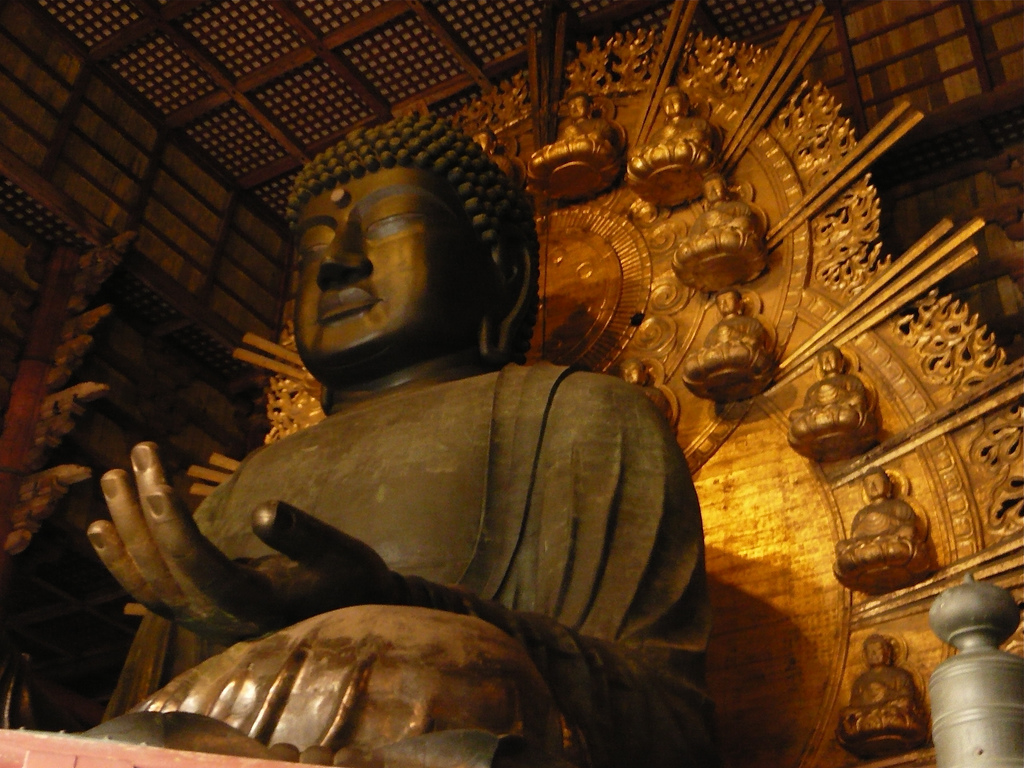
Tōdai-ji's Daibutsu in Nara, Nara

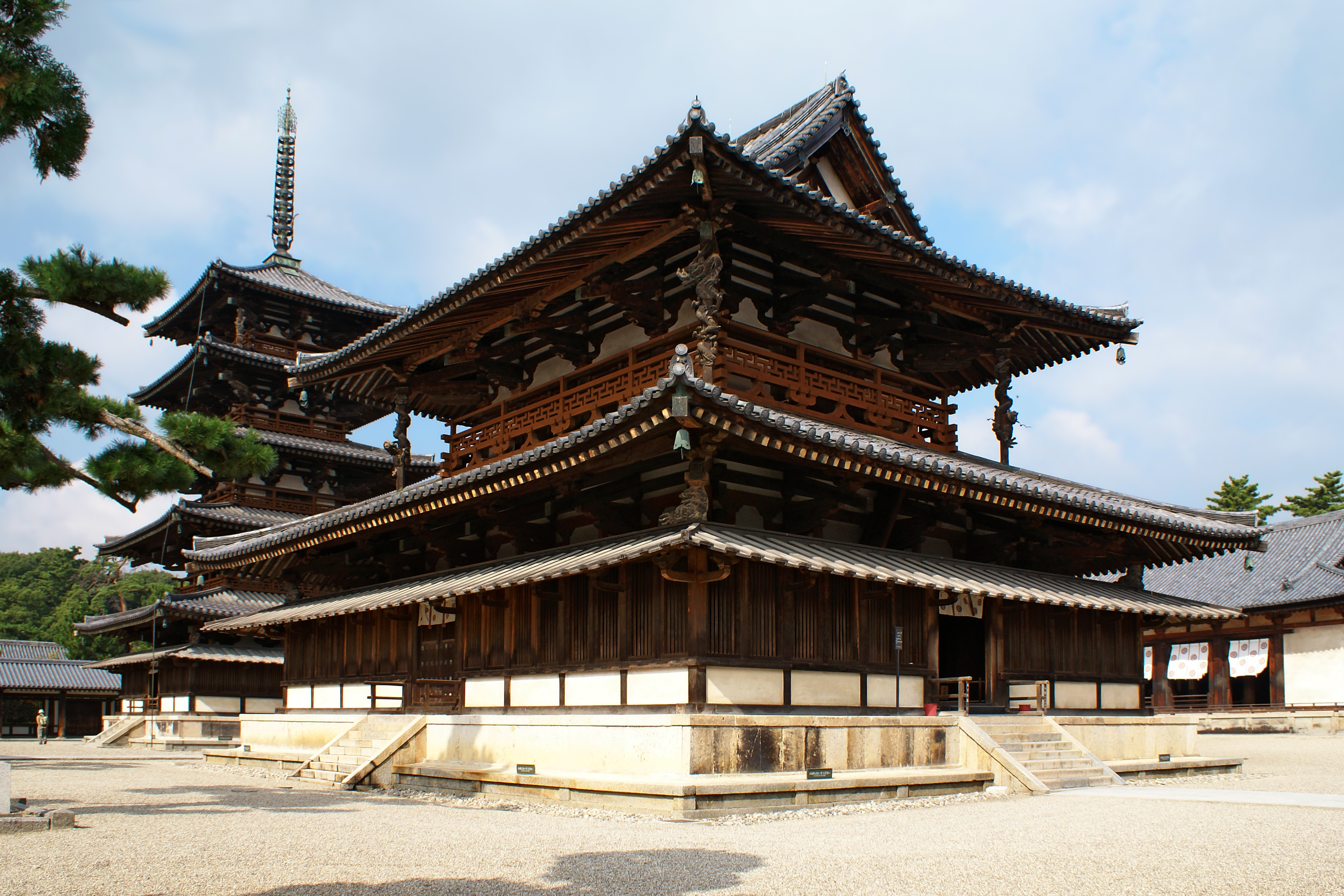
Hōryū-ji in Ikaruga, Nara

- Asuka-dera
- Daian-ji
- Gangō-ji
- Hase-dera
- Hōki-ji
- Hokke-ji
- Hōryū-ji
- Kimpusen-ji
- Kōfuku-ji
- Ōminesan-ji
- Murō-ji
- Saidai-ji
- Shin-Yakushi-ji
- Taima-dera
- Tōdai-ji
- Tōshōdai-ji
- Yakushi-ji

== Okayama ==
- Inryō-ji

== Osaka ==
- Shitennō-ji (the first Buddhist and oldest officially administered temple in Japan)

== Saitama ==
- Heirin-ji
- Kenshō-in in Kumagaya, Saitama

== Shiga ==
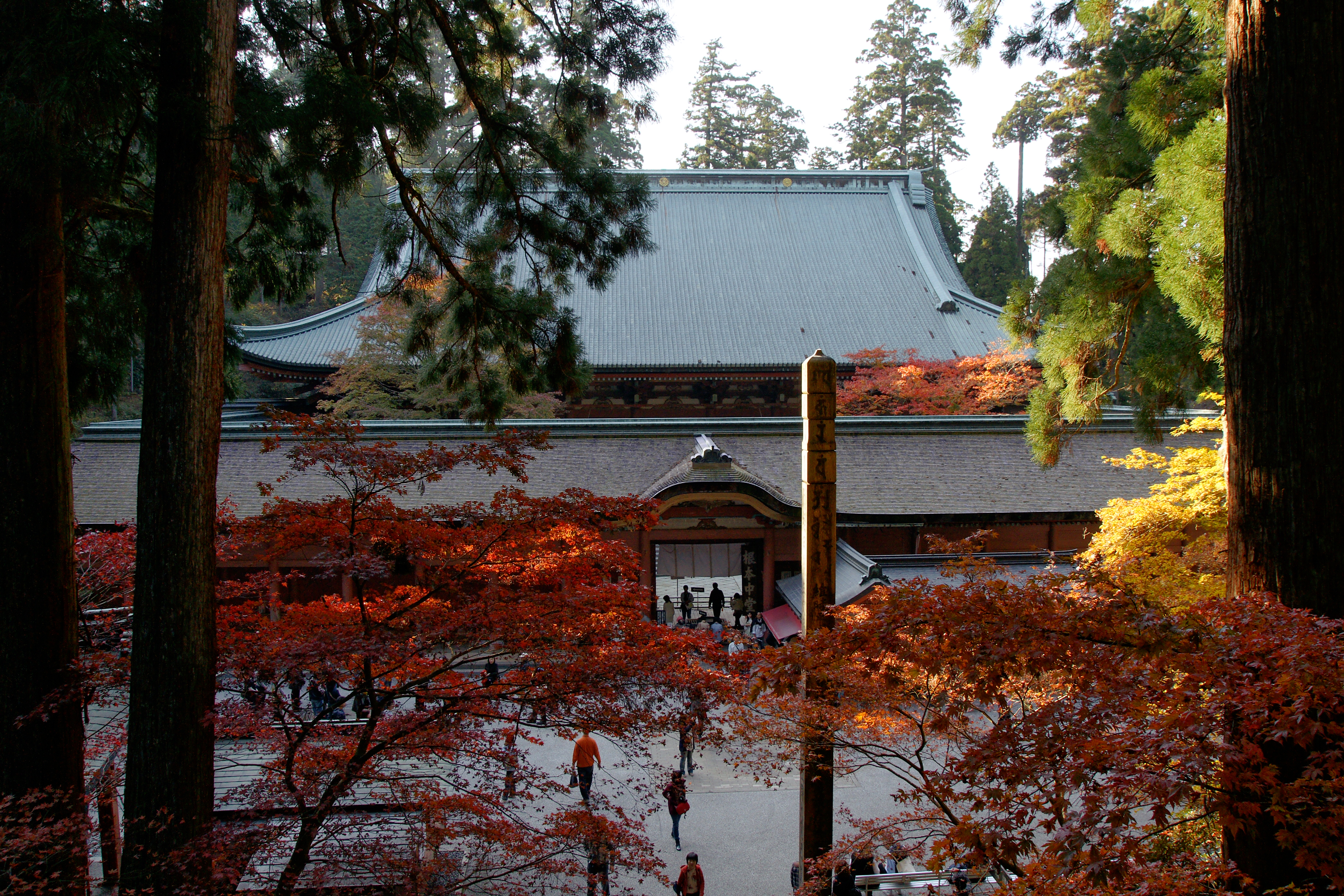
Konpon Chū-dō of Enryakuji in Ōtsu, Shiga

- Eigen-ji
- Enryaku-ji (Temple complex on a mountain northeast of the city)
- Ishiyama-dera
- Mii-dera

== Shizuoka ==
- Ryūtaku-ji
- Shōgen-ji
- Taiseki-ji

== Tochigi ==
- Rinnō-ji
- Hon-ji Senju-ji

== Tokushima ==
- Anraku-ji
- Byōdō-ji
- Dainichi-ji
- Gokuraku-ji
- Hōrin-ji
- Jizō-ji
- Jōraku-ji
- Jūraku-ji
- Kannon-ji
- Kirihata-ji
- Konsen-ji
- Kumadani-ji
- Onzan-ji
- Ryōzen-ji
- Tatsue-ji
- Yakuo-ji

== Tokyo ==
- Gōtoku-ji
- Kan'ei-ji
- Sengaku-ji
- Sensō-ji (temple complex)
- Shōfuku-ji in Higashimurayama
- Tsukiji Hongan-ji
- Zōjō-ji

== Toyama ==
- Kokutai-ji

== Wakayama ==
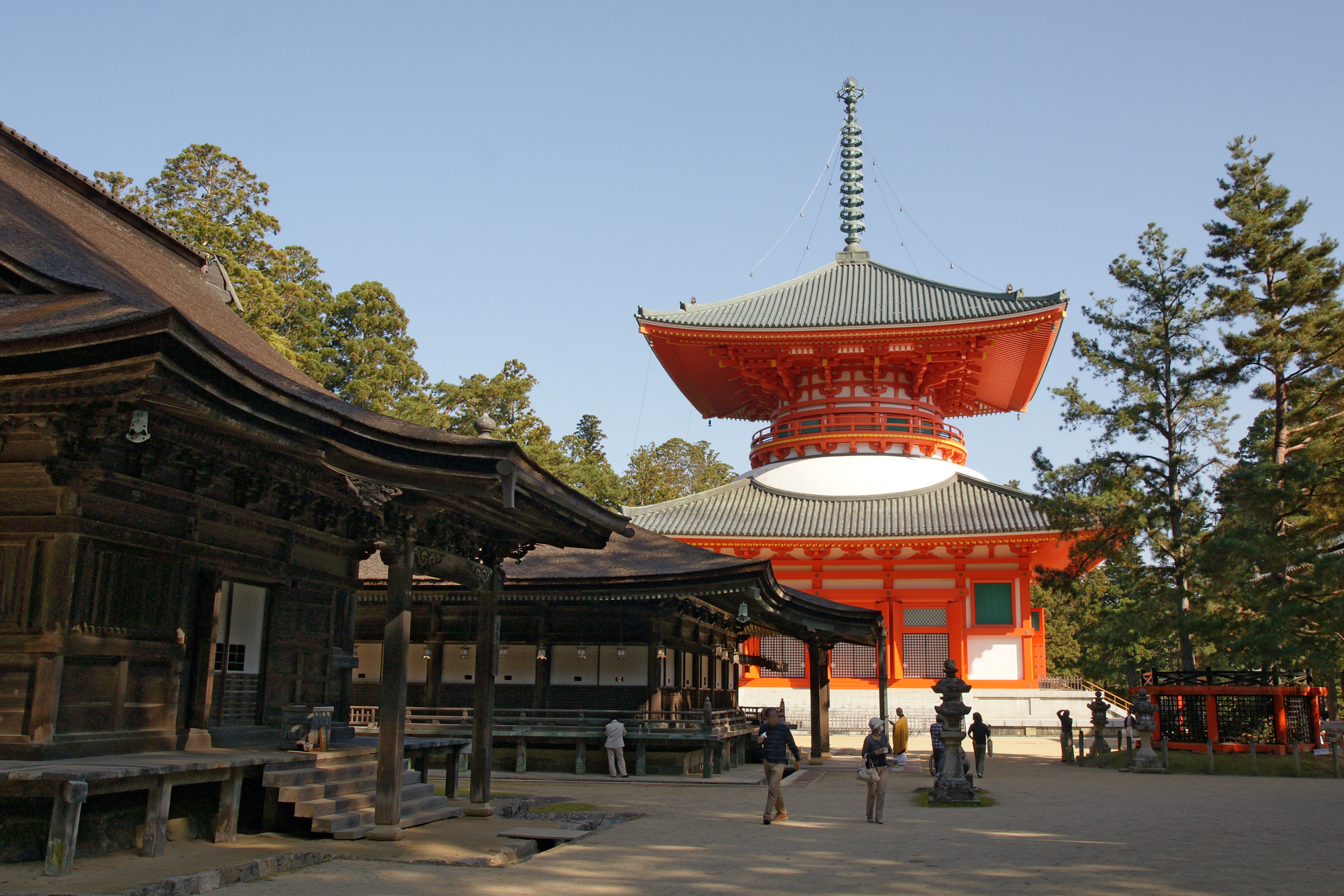
Danjogaran of Mount Kōya

- Chōhō-ji
- Fudarakusan-ji
- Jison-in
- Mount Kōya (temple complex)
  - Kongōbu-ji
- Negoro-ji
- Seiganto-ji

== Yamagata ==
- Yama-dera

== Yamaguchi ==
- Kōzan-ji in Shimonoseki

== Yamanashi ==
- Kōgaku-ji
- Kuon-ji

== See also ==
- Buddhism in Japan
- Daibutsu
- Japanese Buddhist architecture
- Shinbutsu-shūgō
- List of Buddhist temples
- List of National Treasures of Japan (temples)
