= List of Natural Monuments of Japan (Tokushima) =

This list is of the Natural Monuments of Japan within the Prefecture of Tokushima.

== National Natural Monuments ==
As of 1 April 2021, twenty-five Natural Monuments have been designated, including four *Special Natural Monuments; Miune-Tenguzuka Miyama kumazasa and Rhododendron tschonoskii Communities spans the prefectural borders with Kōchi.

Monument	Municipality	Comments	Image	Coordinates	Type	Ref.
*Japanese serow Capricornis crispus カモシカ; Kamoshika		designated across thirty prefectures			1.1	
*Otter; Lutra nippon カワウソ; Kawauso					1.2	
*Japanese giant salamander Andrias japonicus オオサンショウウオ; Õsanshōuo		designated across eighteen prefectures			1.2	
*Kamo Giant Camphor tree Cinnamomum camphora 加茂の大クス; Kamo no ō-kusu	Higashimiyoshi			34°02′27″N 133°55′55″E	2.1	
Japanese dormouse Glirulus japonicus ヤマネ; Yamane		found in Honshū, Shikoku, and Kyūshū			1.1	
Brent goose Branta bernicla コクガン; Kokugan					1.2	
Bean goose Anser fabalis ヒシクイ; Hishikui					1.2	
Greater white-fronted goose Anser albifrons マガン; Magan					1.2	
Haha River Giant mottled eel Habitat; Anguilla marmorata 母川オオウナギ生息地; Haha-gawa ōunagi seisoku-chi	Kaiyō			33°35′52″N 134°20′33″E	1.3	
Ōhama Beach Sea turtles and their Egg-laying Grounds; Chelonioidea 大浜海岸のウミガメおよびその産卵地; Ōhama kaigan no umigame oyobi sono sanran-chi	Minami			33°43′57″N 134°32′38″E	1.2	
Misato Fireflies and their Area of Incidence; Lampyridae 美郷のホタルおよびその発生地; Misato no hotaru oyobi sono hassei-chi	Yoshinogawa			34°00′46″N 134°16′28″E	1.3	
Akabane Taishi Chinese hackberry Celtis sinensis 赤羽根大師のエノキ; Akabane Taishi no enoki	Tsurugi			33°57′08″N 134°04′11″E	2.1	
Awa Sand Pillars 阿波の土柱; Awa no dochū	Awa			34°05′34″N 134°12′25″E	3.9	
Sakashū Irregular Strata 坂州不整合; Sakashū fuseigō	Naka			33°49′40″N 134°17′55″E	3.1,2,7	
Sawatani Thismia abei Area of Incidence 沢谷のタヌキノショクダイ発生地; Sawatani no tanukinoshokudai hassei-chi	Naka			33°51′58″N 134°15′47″E	2.12	
Shishikui Bay Fossil Ripples 宍喰浦の化石漣痕; Shishikui-ura no kaseki renkon	Kaiyō			33°33′36″N 134°18′40″E	3.1	
Mount Suzu Mitrastemonaceae Area of Incidence 鈴が峯のヤッコソウ発生地; Suzu-ga-mine no yakkosō hassei-chi	Kaiyō			33°34′46″N 134°17′41″E	2.12	
Tsu-shima Temperate Plant Communities 津島暖地性植物群落; Tsu-shima danchi-sei shokubutsu gunraku	Mugi			33°38′19″N 134°26′52″E	2.2	
Deba-jima Ōike Lamprothamnium succinctum Native Area 出羽島大池のシラタマモ自生地; Deba-jima Ōike no shiratamamo jisei-chi	Mugi			33°37′54″N 134°25′22″E	2.10	
Nyūbo Jinja Ginkgo; Ginkgo biloba 乳保神社のイチョウ; Nyūbo Jinja no ichō	Kamiita			34°05′59″N 134°23′55″E	2.1	
Nogami Giant Chinaberry tree Melia azedarach 野神の大センダン; Nogami no dai-sendan	Awa			34°05′06″N 134°15′08″E	2.1	
Funakubo Rhododendron Communities; Rhododendron weyrichii 船窪のオンツツジ群落; Funakubo no ontsutsuji gunraku	Yoshinogawa			34°00′09″N 134°11′50″E	2.4	
Benten-jima Tropical Plant Communities 弁天島熱帯性植物群落; Benten-jima nettaisei shokubutsu gunraku	Anan			33°52′22″N 134°39′29″E	2.2,10	
Ōboke-Koboke 大歩危 小歩危; Ōboke・Koboke	Miyoshi			33°53′12″N 133°45′38″E		
Miune-Tenguzuka Miyama kumazasa and Rhododendron tschonoskii Communities 三嶺・天狗塚のミヤマクマザサ及びコメツツジ群落; Miune・Tenguzuka no miyama-kuma-zasa oyobi kometsutsuji gunraku	Miyoshi	designation includes areas of Kami in Kōchi Prefecture		33°50′26″N 133°58′48″E	2.2	

April 2021

== Prefectural Natural Monuments ==
As of 1 February 2021, sixty-three Natural Monuments have been designated at a prefectural level.

Monument	Municipality	Comments	Image	Coordinates	Type	Ref.
Kamouda Loggerhead sea turtle Egg-laying Grounds; Caretta caretta 蒲生田のアカウミガメ産卵地; Kamouda no akaumigame sanran-chi	Anan			33°50′05″N 134°45′01″E		for all refs see
Kuwano River Japanese perch Coreoperca kawamebari 桑野川のオヤニラミ; Kuwano-gawa no oyanirame	Anan			33°50′55″N 134°34′48″E		
Ō-shima Grey herons and their Colonies; Ardea cinerea 大島のアオサギとその群生地; Ō-shima no aosagi to sono gunsei-chi	Mugi			33°38′06″N 134°29′33″E		
Mount Tsurugi and its Subarctic Plant Forest 剣山並びに亜寒帯植物林; Tsurugi-san narabini akantai shokubutsu-rin	Mima, Naka, Miyoshi	also a Prefectural Place of Scenic Beauty		33°51′13″N 134°05′39″E		
Minoda-no-Fuchi 美濃田の淵; Minoda-no-fuchi	Higashimiyoshi	also a Prefectural Place of Scenic Beauty		34°18′33″N 133°59′23″E		

== Municipal Natural Monuments ==
As of 1 May 2020, one hundred and forty-nine Natural Monuments have been designated at a municipal level.

== See also ==
- Cultural Properties of Japan
- Parks and gardens in Tokushima Prefecture
- List of Places of Scenic Beauty of Japan (Tokushima)
- List of Historic Sites of Japan (Tokushima)
