= Hōrin-ji =

Hōrin-ji (法輪寺) is the name of a number of Buddhist temples in Japan. In particular, it most often refers to:

- Hōrin-ji (Awa), a Kōya-san Shingon temple in Awa, Tokushima Prefecture, Japan. Temple 9 on the Shikoku 88 temple pilgrimage, the main image is of Parinirvana Shaka Nyorai. The temple is said to have been founded by Kōbō Daishi, who carved the image
- Hōrin-ji (Harima), a Rinzai Buddhist temple in Himeji, Hyōgo Prefecture (formerly Harima province)
- Hōrin-ji (Nara), Ikaruga, Nara Prefecture (also known as Mii-dera)
- Hōrin-ji (Kyoto), Arashiyama, Kyoto Prefecture
