= Awa Sand Pillars =

Sandstone rock formations in Tokushima, Japan

Awa-no-dochū
- IUCN category III (natural monument or feature)
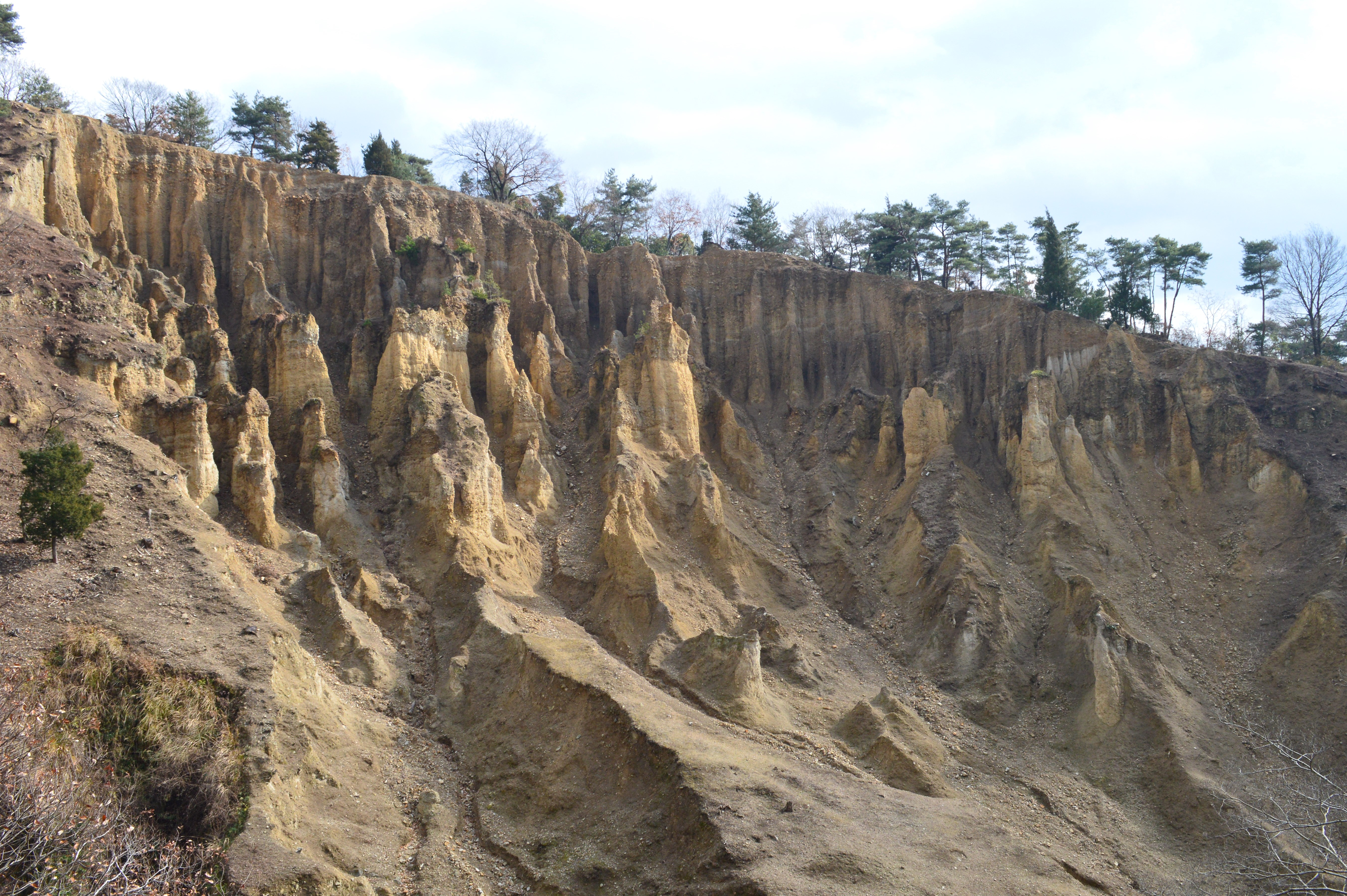
- typical rock formations at Awa-no-dochū

- Location within Tokushima Prefecture Location within Japan
- Location: Awa, Tokushima Prefecture, Japan
- Coordinates: 34°05′34″N 134°12′25″E
- Established: May 1, 1934
- Natural Monument

The Awa-no-dochū (阿波の土柱｜Earth Pillars of Awa, also referred to as the Awa Sand Pillars or Awa no Douban), is a formation of sandstone and gravel hoodoos located in the city Awa, Tokushima Prefecture, on the island of Shikoku, Japan. The formation is located with Dochū-Kōtsu Prefectural Natural Park.

The formation is designated as a natural treasure of Japan.

== Description ==
The pillars of earth seen at Awa are hoodoos, thin spires of rock that have been weathered in such a way as to take on an unusual shape. As opposed to other rock formations, hoodoos are created when a harder type of rock forms above a softer rock; as wind, rain, and other natural processes gradually wear down the stone, the soft rock is worn away faster than the hard rock (which is known as a "cap"), creating a cone or pillar. Continuous erosion of the soft rock causes the cap to grow unstable, eventually falling off and exposing the rest of the pillar to erosion.

In Tsuchiya Takakoshi prefectural natural park, the hoodoos seen are made from layers of ancient gravel and sand (later compressed into sandstone) deposited by the nearby Yoshino River, which used to cover the area. Thought to have formed 1.2 million years ago, the compacted gravel deposited by the river weathers at a slower speed than the sandstone, creating the erratic rock formations. The Awa hoodoos vary in size and shape; some of the smaller pillars are 10 meters high, while the largest (named "Wadakuto") is 90 meters tall. The hoodoos at Awa are one of only three such formations in the world, with the other two being in the Rocky Mountains and Tyrol.

The first record of the formation dates to 800 A.D. In May 1935 the formation was designated a National Natural Monument. and was later incorporated into Dochū-Kōtsu Prefectural Natural Park. The site is one of the 88 Sceneries of Tokushima.

== See also ==
- List of Natural Monuments of Japan (Tokushima)
