= Okumiyagawa-Uchidani Prefectural Natural Park =

Natural park of Tokushima prefecture, Japan

- 奥宮川内谷県立自然公園
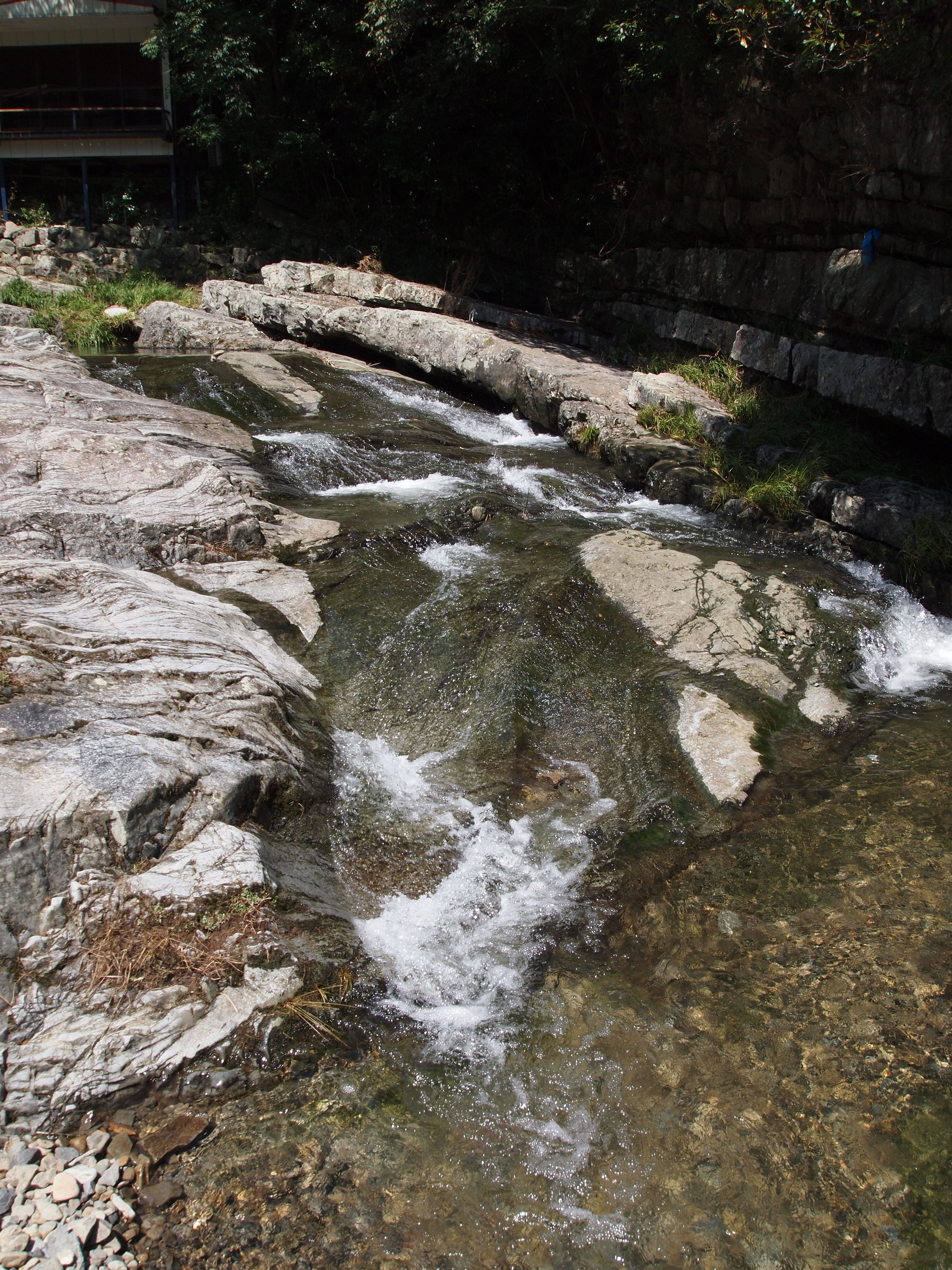
- Miyagōchidani River
- Interactive map of Okumiyagawa-Uchidani Prefectural Natural Park
- Location: Tokushima Prefecture, Japan
- Area: 13.25 km^{2} (5.12 sq mi)
- Established: 1 January 1967

Okumiyagawa-Uchidani Prefectural Natural Park (奥宮川内谷県立自然公園, Okumiyagawa-Uchidani kenritsu shizen kōen) is a Prefectural Natural Park in Awa, Tokushima Prefecture, Japan. It was established in 1967.

== See also ==
- National Parks of Japan
