= Arako Kannon =

Coordinates: 35°8′11.65″N 136°51′29.61″E

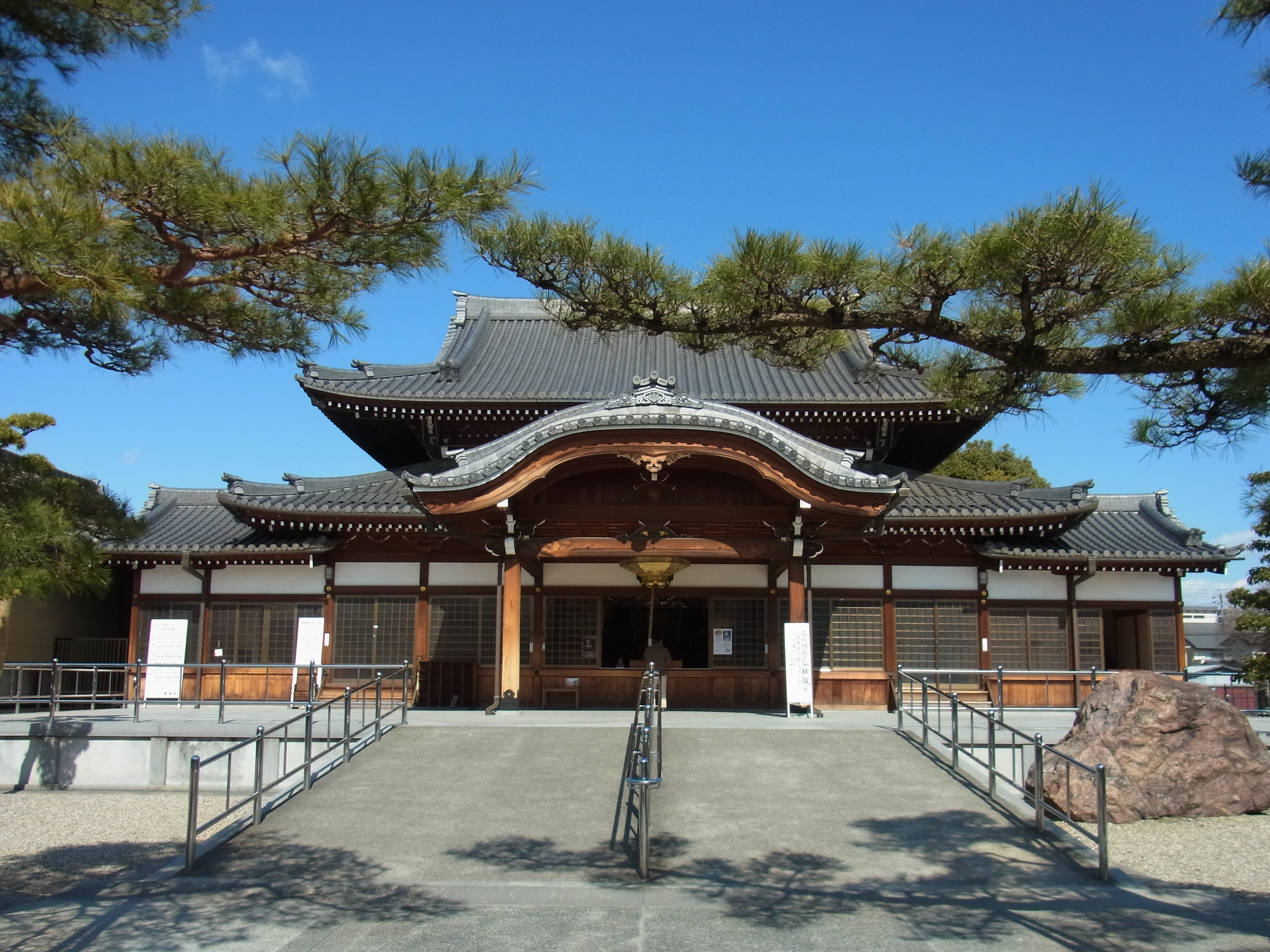
Hondō

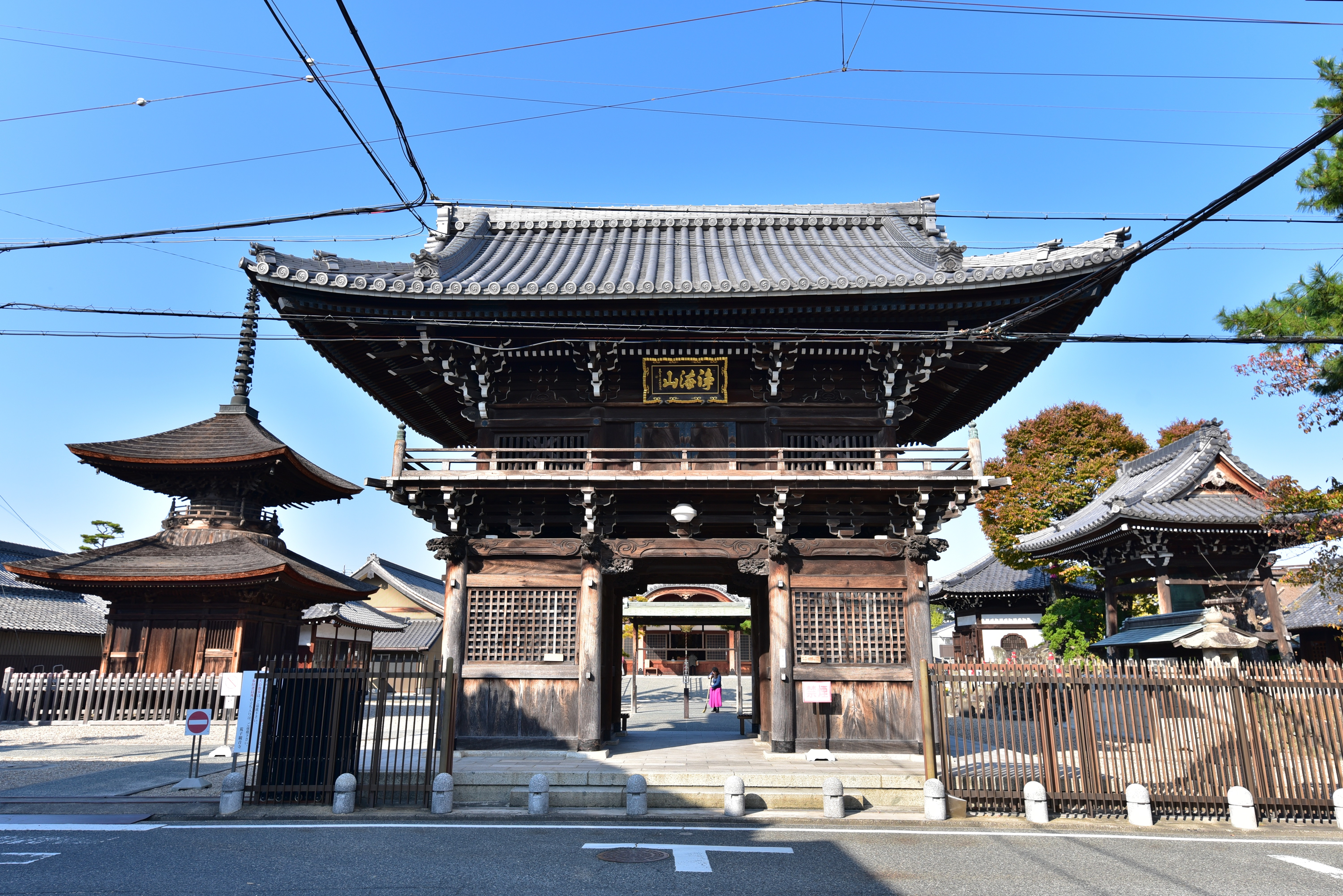
Sanmon

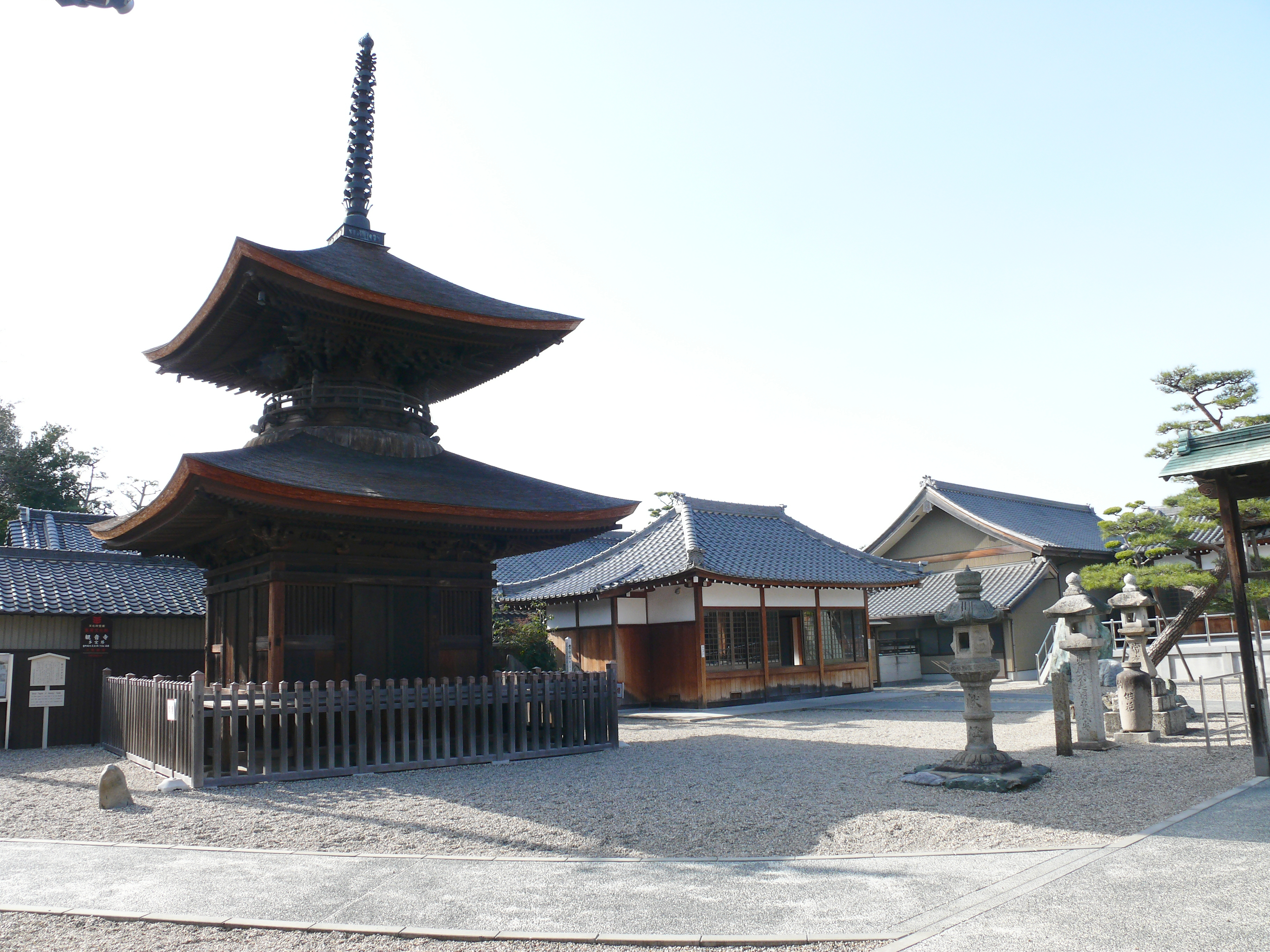
Wooden pagoda of Arako Kannon dating to the 16th century.

Arako Kannon (荒子観音), also known as Jōkai-san Enryū-in Kannon-ji (浄海山圓龍（円竜）院観音寺) is a Buddhist temple located in Nagoya in central Japan.

It has a wooden pagoda which is one of Japan's oldest, dating to the 16th century. Maeda Toshiie's family boddhisatva.
