= Jūraku-ji (Awa) =

Coordinates: 34°7′14.7″N 134°22′40.53″E

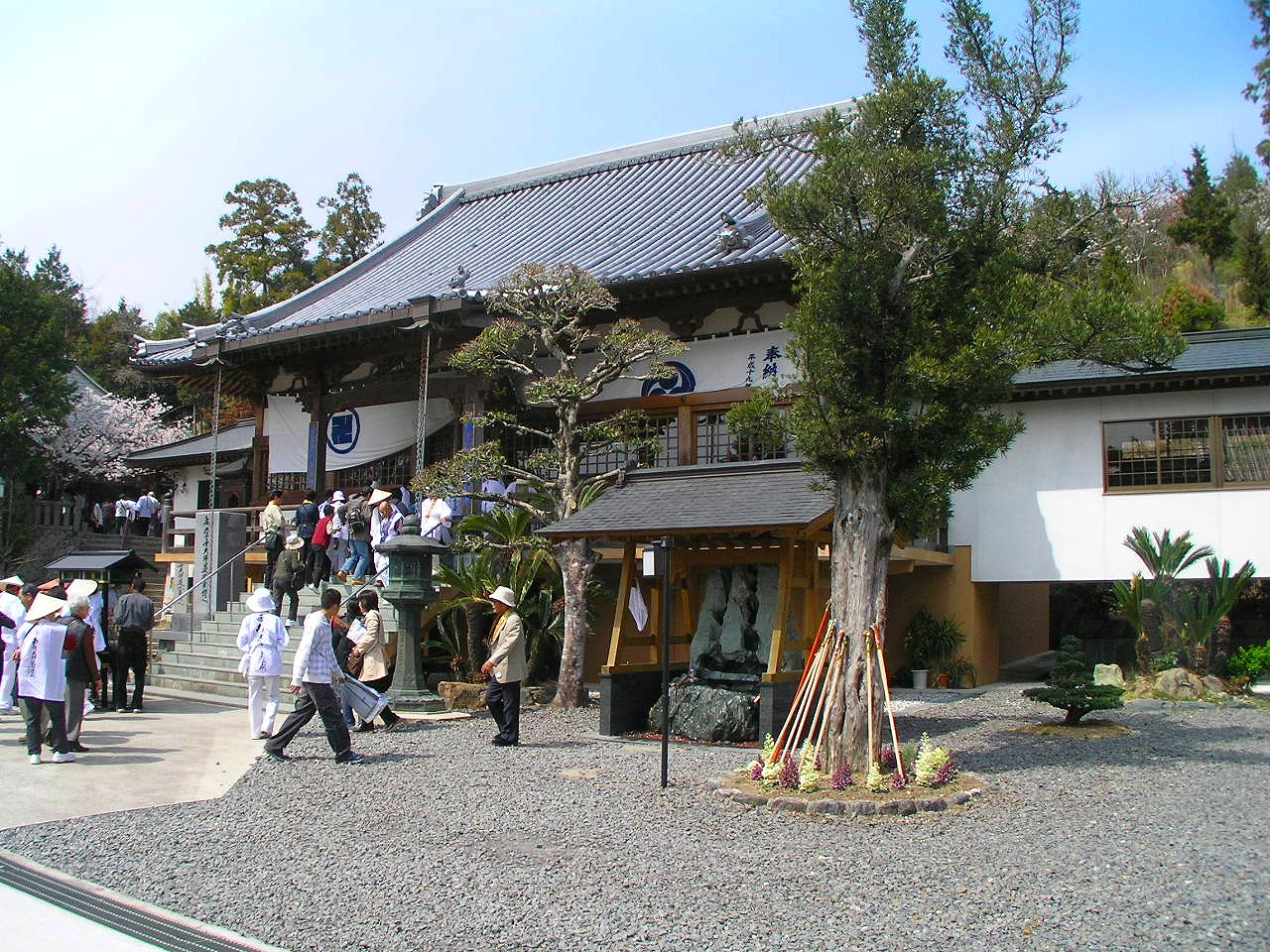
Jūraku-ji Hondō

Jūraku-ji (十楽寺) is a Kōya-san Shingon temple in Awa, Tokushima Prefecture, Japan. Temple 7 on the Shikoku 88 temple pilgrimage, the main image is of Amida Nyorai, a key figure in Pure Land Buddhism. The temple is said to have been founded by Kōbō Daishi, who carved the image.

== See also ==
- Shikoku 88 temple pilgrimage
