= Shōfuku-ji (Higashimurayama) =

Shōfuku-ji 正福寺
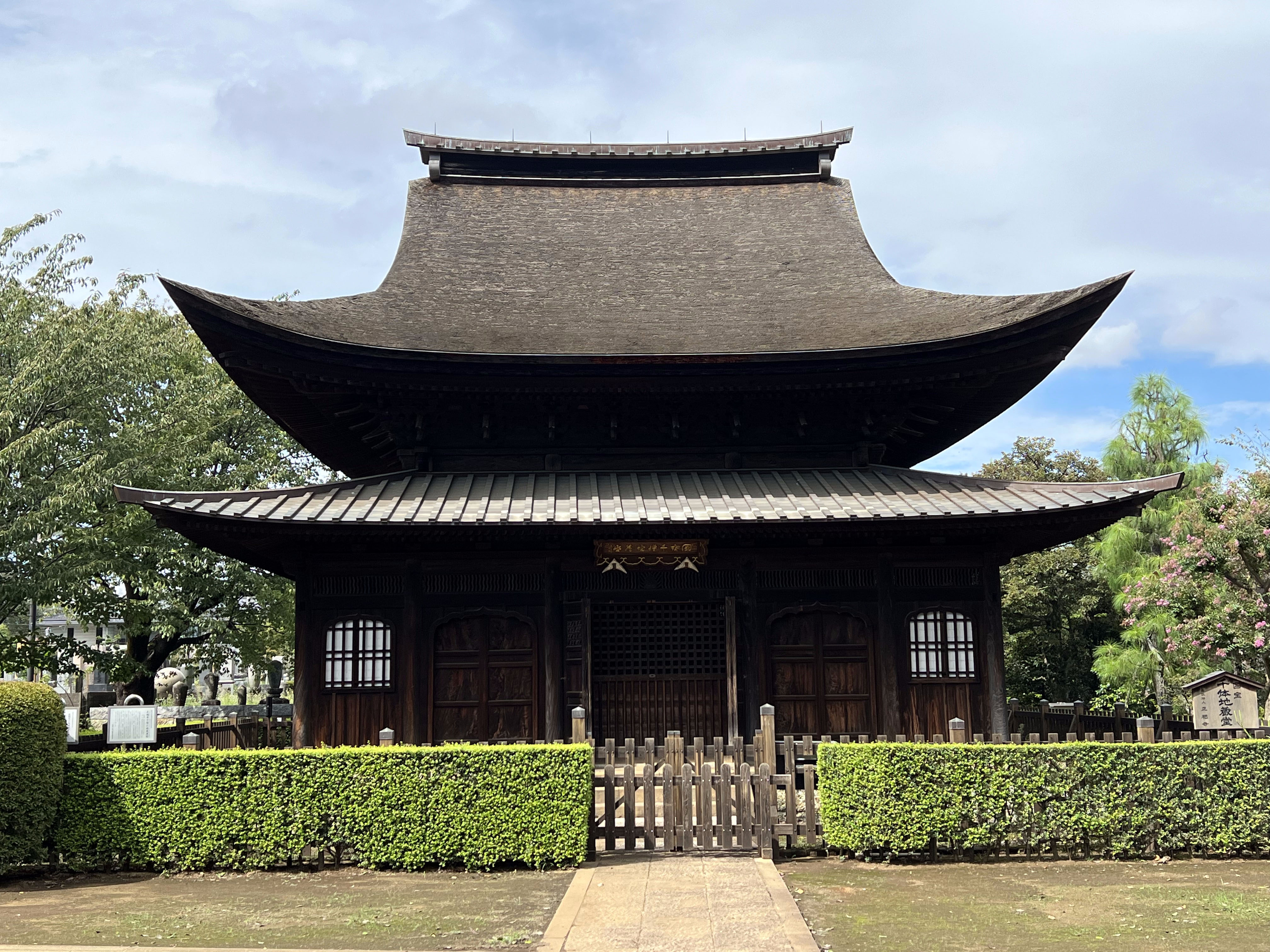
- Shōfuku-ji Jizō Hall

Religion
- Affiliation: Rinzai school (Kencho-ji branch)
- Deity: Senju Kannon Bosatsu

Location
- Location: Higashimurayama, Tokyo
- Country: Japan
- Interactive map of Shōfuku-ji 正福寺
- Coordinates: 35°45′53″N 139°27′34″E

Architecture
- Founder: Hōjō Tokiyori / Hōjō Tokimune
- Completed: 1407

Shōfuku-ji (正福寺; lit. Temple of the Correct Fortune) is a Rinzai Zen Buddhist temple in Higashimurayama, Tokyo, Japan. Its early 15th century Jizō hall is a registered National Treasure of Japan. It is considered to be the oldest intact building in Tokyo Prefecture and a unique example of Kamakura period architecture.

== History ==
Shōfuku-ji was founded in 1270, during the Kamakura period. The temple records state that a Jizō hall was built in 1278 under the sponsorship of Kamakura Regent Hōjō Tokiyori. Tradition holds that the Regent fell ill while on hunting expedition and was nursed back to health back by a resident priest. In gratitude, Tokiyori commissioned builders from Kamakura to build the Jizō hall.

There is some question as to the accuracy of this story given that Tokiyori died in 1263. Nonetheless, official patronage from the Kamakura shogunate was key in the temple construction. It is worth noting that the temple may have been founded and constructed during the ministry of Tokiyori's son, Hōjō Tokimune under whose authority Japan successfully defended itself against Mongol Invasions.

The current Jizo hall was rebuilt in 1407, according to an inscription in India ink discovered in 1933, when the Jizo hall was repaired. The writing also stated that this temple has been dedicated to Jizo Bodhisattva since this was founded.

This temple remains largely in its original configuration since the time it was founded.

== Architecture ==
The Shōfuku-ji Jizō hall employed new building techniques perfected by the Japanese master builders during the Kamakura era that permitted more strength, elasticity, and detail compared to Chinese, Korean, or earlier Japanese techniques. From the outside it appears as a two-story structure with sharply upturned eaves on the roofs. Internally, it is a single open space. This effect results from the lower roof mokoshi. This is called Zenshūyō. This style can be seen at Shariden of Enkaku-ji in Kamakura. For example, the curve of the upper roof is similar. However, there are some differences. For example, the mokoshi of the Shōfuku-ji Jizo hall is covered with copper for good conservation. The door opens towards the inside.

It contains significant architectural innovations, including the use of elastic Japanese cypress, steel support chisels, decorative but functional brackets, and cantilevers. These innovations permitted a structure that appears lightweight with its curved hip roof, open interior, and floating, upturned eaves while being structurally sound against earthquakes.

The material of roofs has been thatched. However, in 1933, when the hall was repaired, the roof was changed from thatched to shingled to restore it closer to the original construction configuration. This is made by piling thin boards and fixing using bamboo nails. This “Kokerabuki” is also seen in Katsura Imperial Villa and Kinkaku-ji.

The building was designated a National Treasure on March 29, 1952.

Laymen are permitted to enter the building only once a year, during the festival for Jizo, or “Jizo-matsuri” held on November 3.

== Significance ==
Despite major reconstruction in 1407, Shōfuku-ji's Jizō hall is held to be one of the most representative and intact examples of Kamakura architecture. Though 50 kilometers from Kamakura, this area marked the northern extent of what was considered the outer sphere of the Kamakura defenses. However, this remoteness likely contributed to its preservation since it did not see the destruction that most of the buildings of Kamakura itself experienced.

== Traditions ==
Consistent with it being a place of healing, Shōfuku-ji has a tradition that is believed by many locals to help cure illness. Outside the hall are a number of wooden dolls that, when a family member or friend is sick, are to be taken to the ill person's home. Upon recovery, the original doll plus a new one are returned to the temple.

== Jizō Hall gallery ==
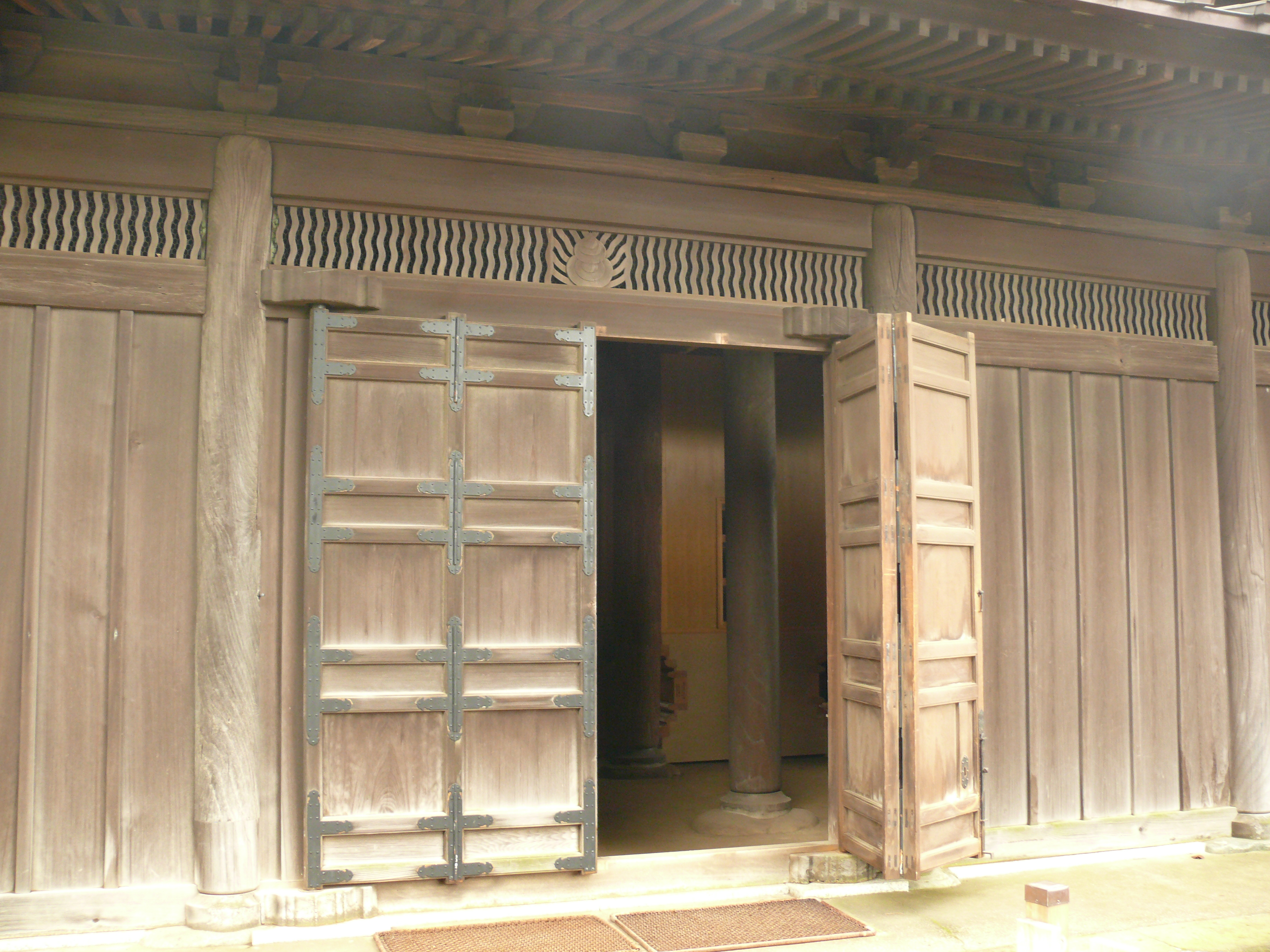
Exterior North

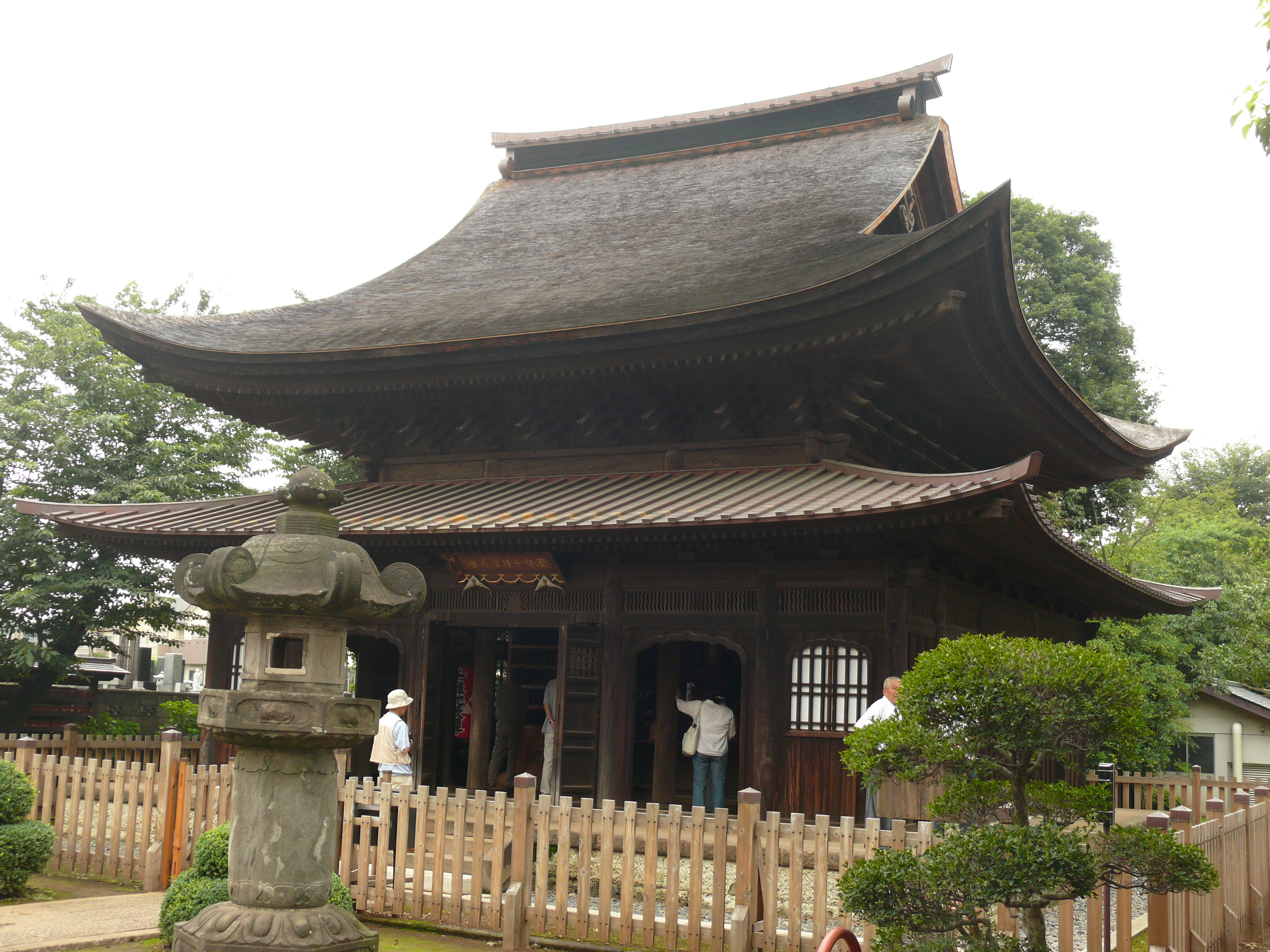
Exterior South

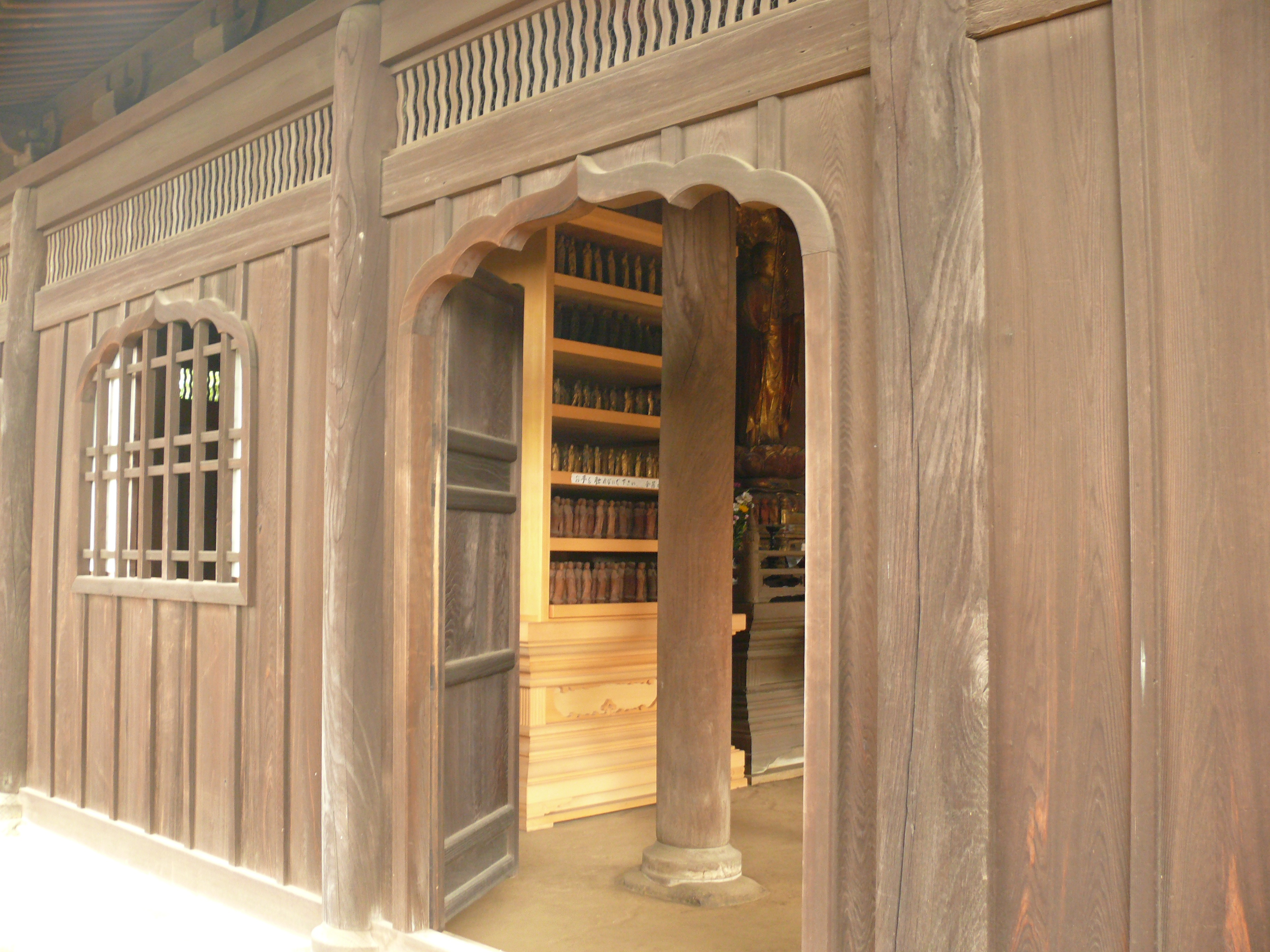
Exterior West

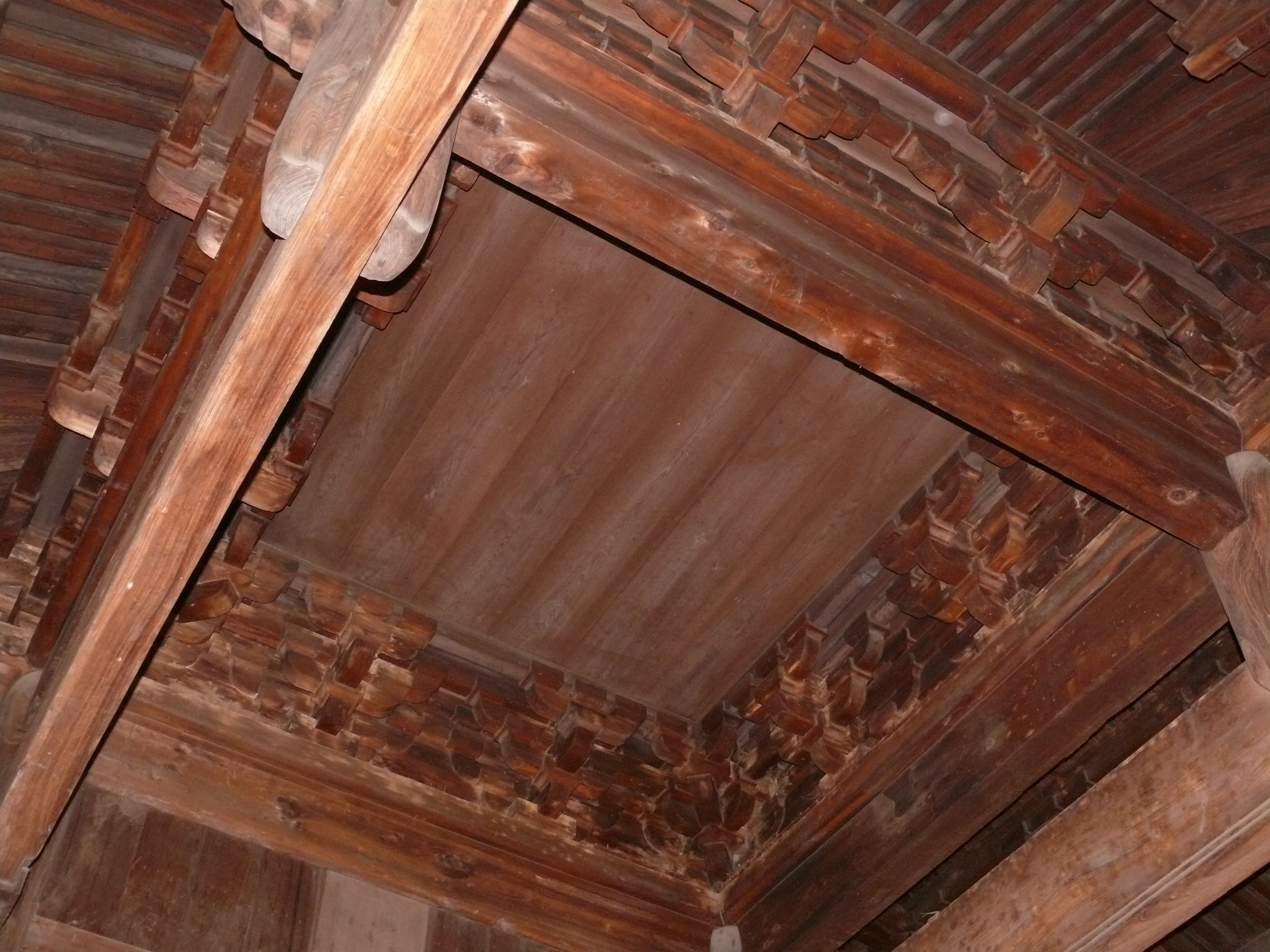
Interior East Ceiling

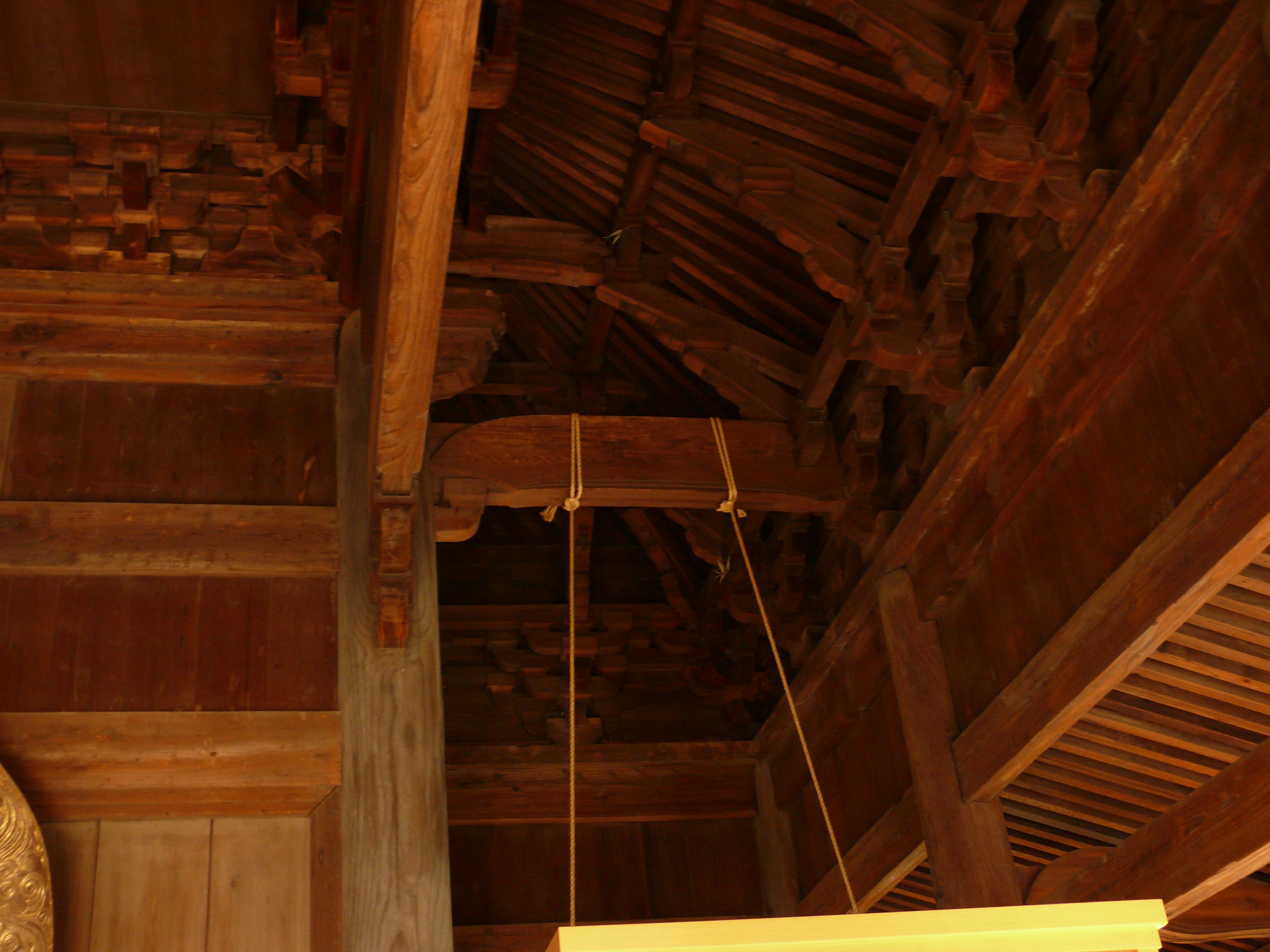
Interior East

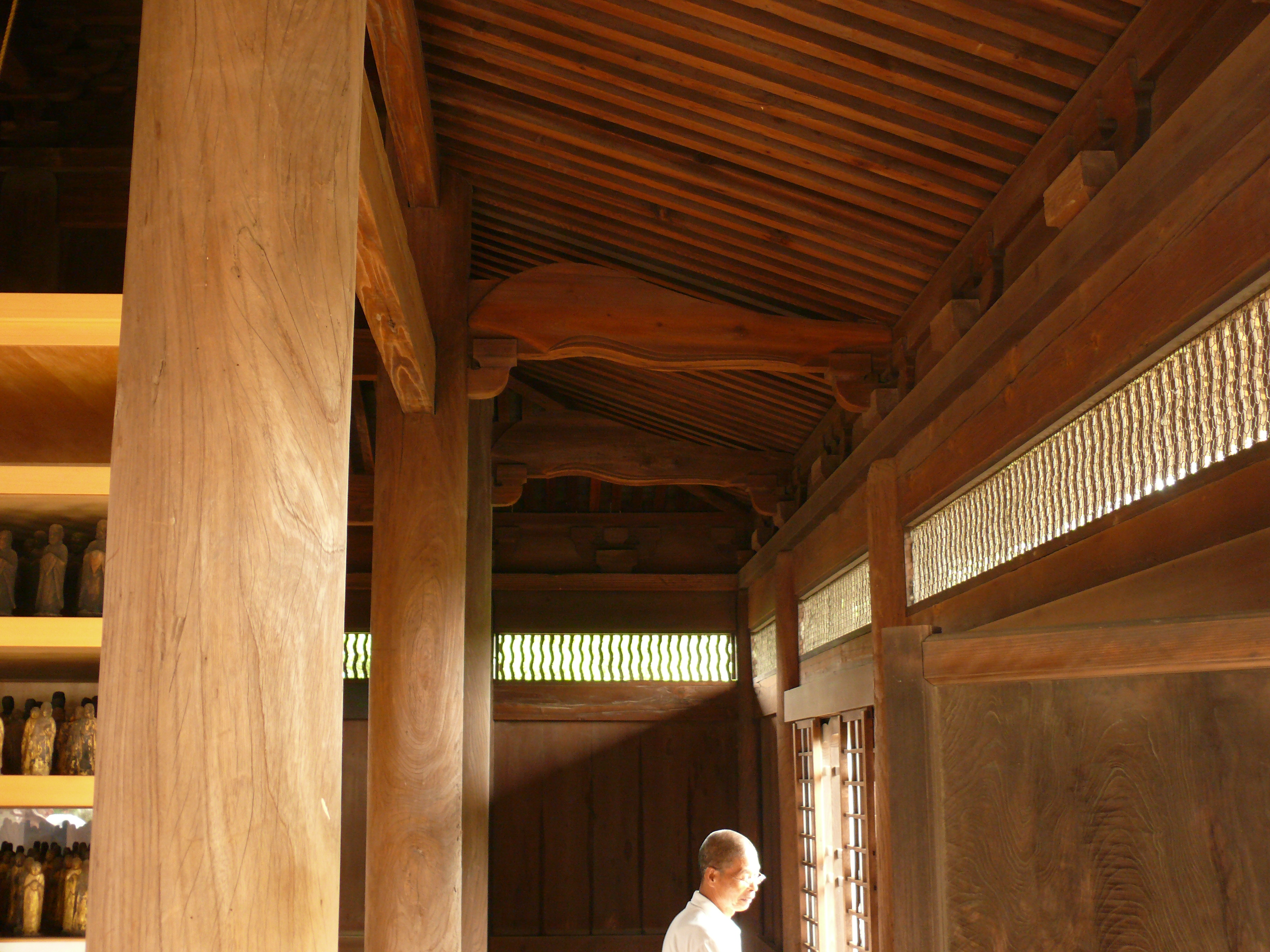
Interior East Lower level

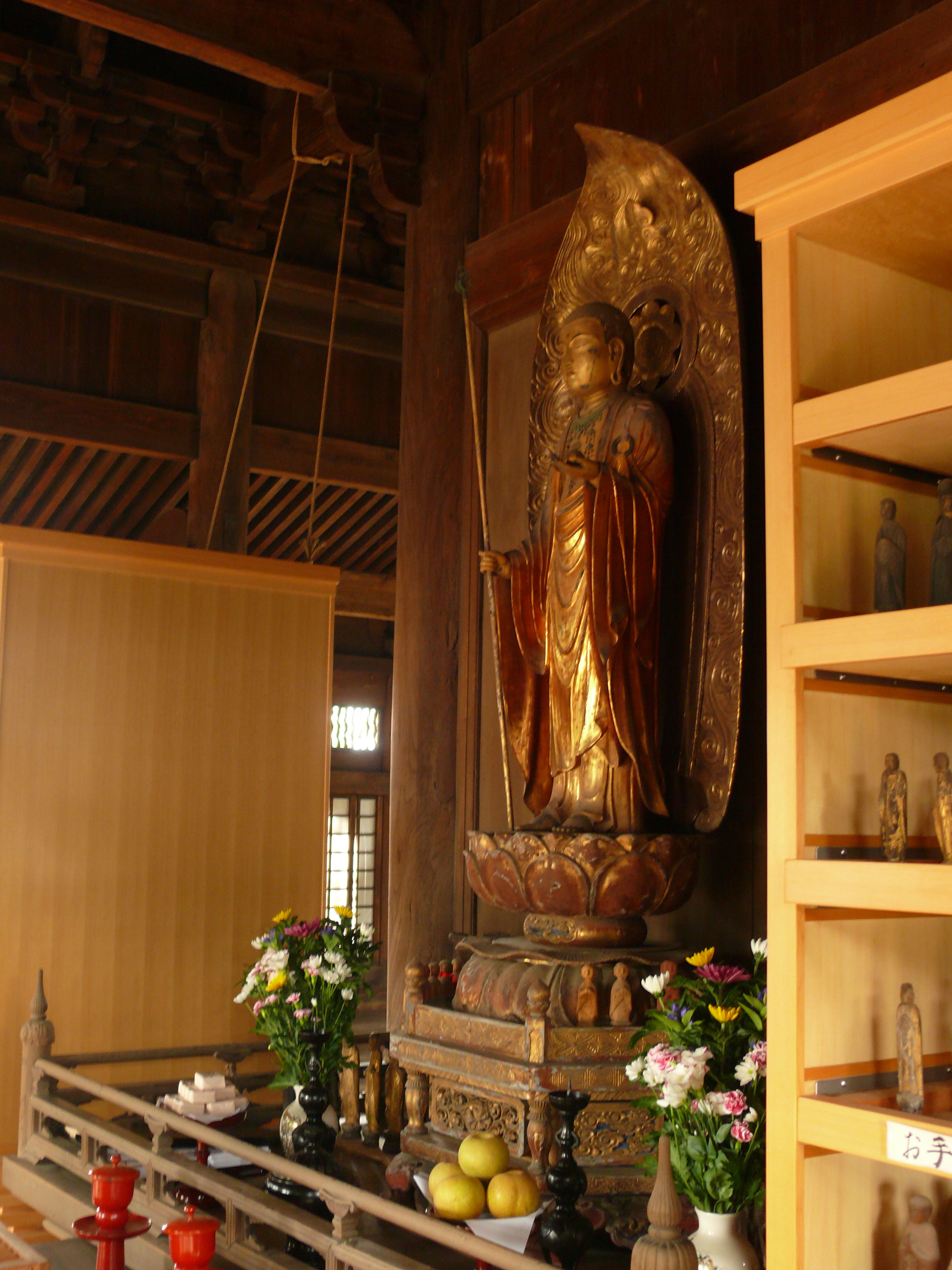
Interior Kṣitigarbha Statue

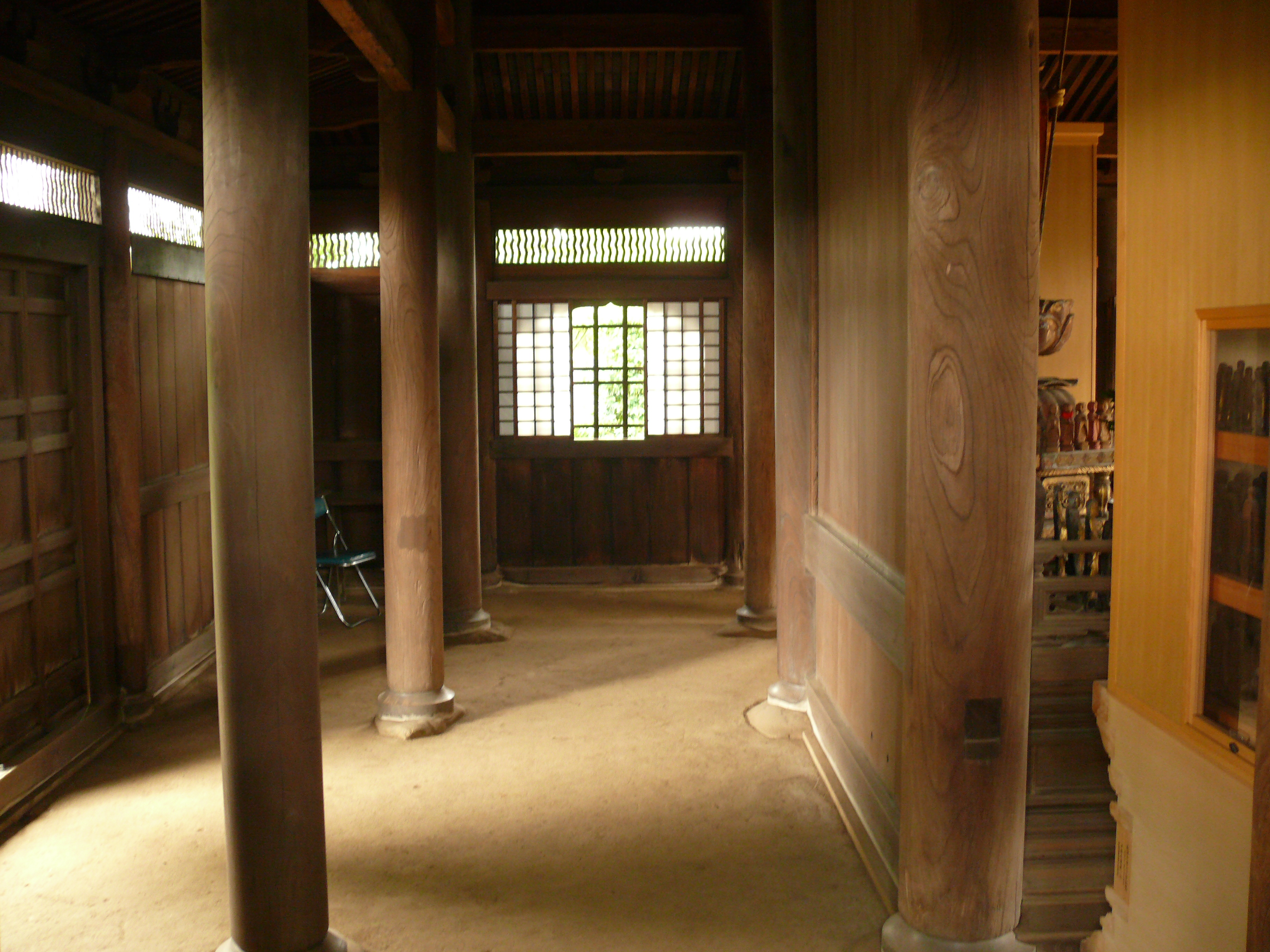
Interior North Lower Level

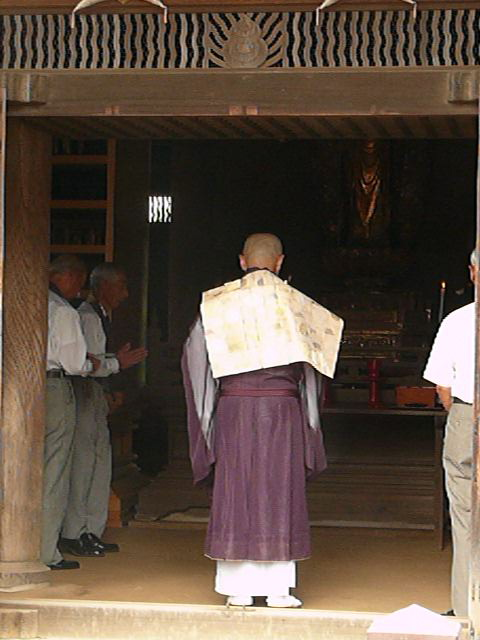
Interior Priest

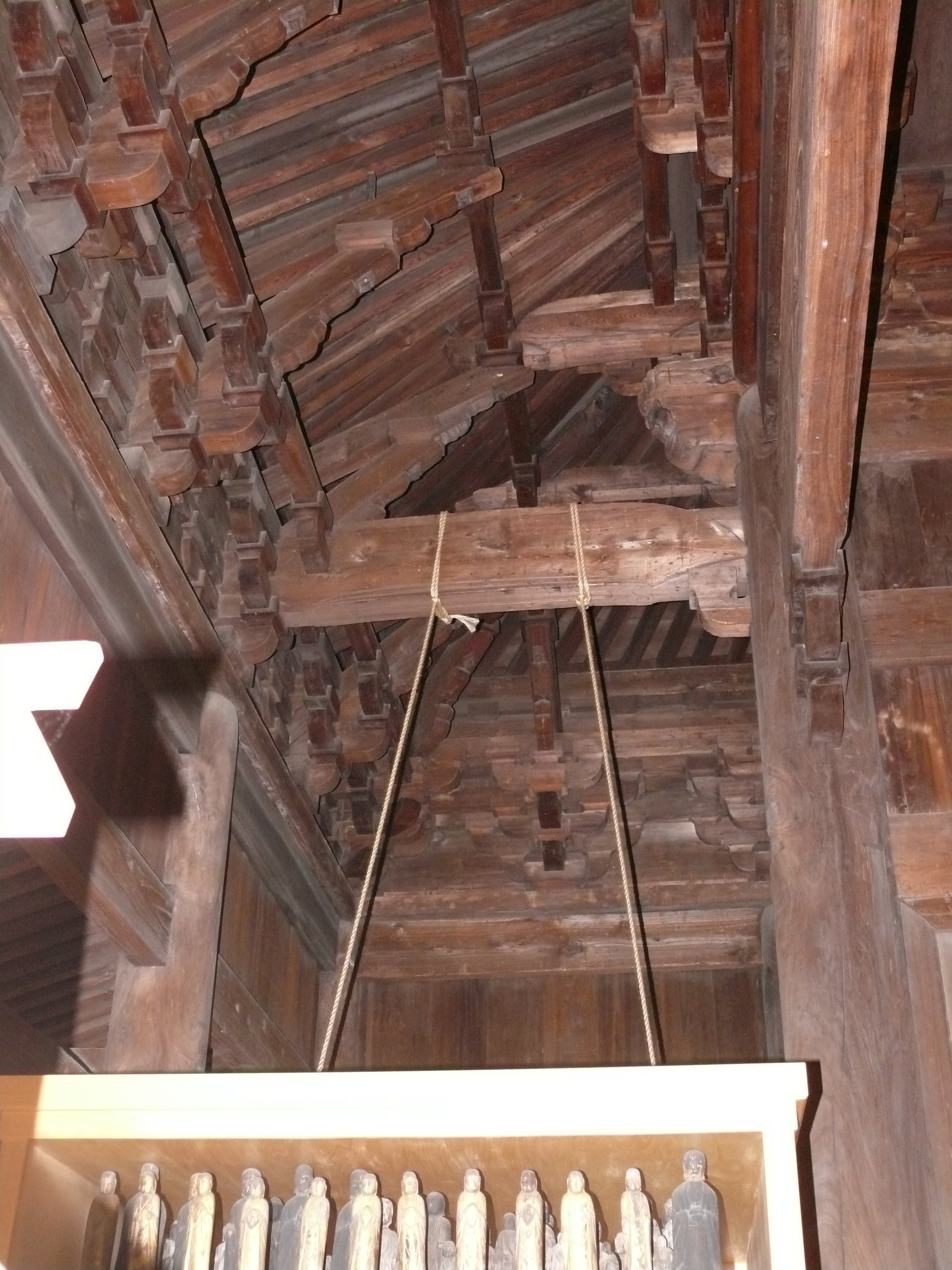
Interior West Ceiling

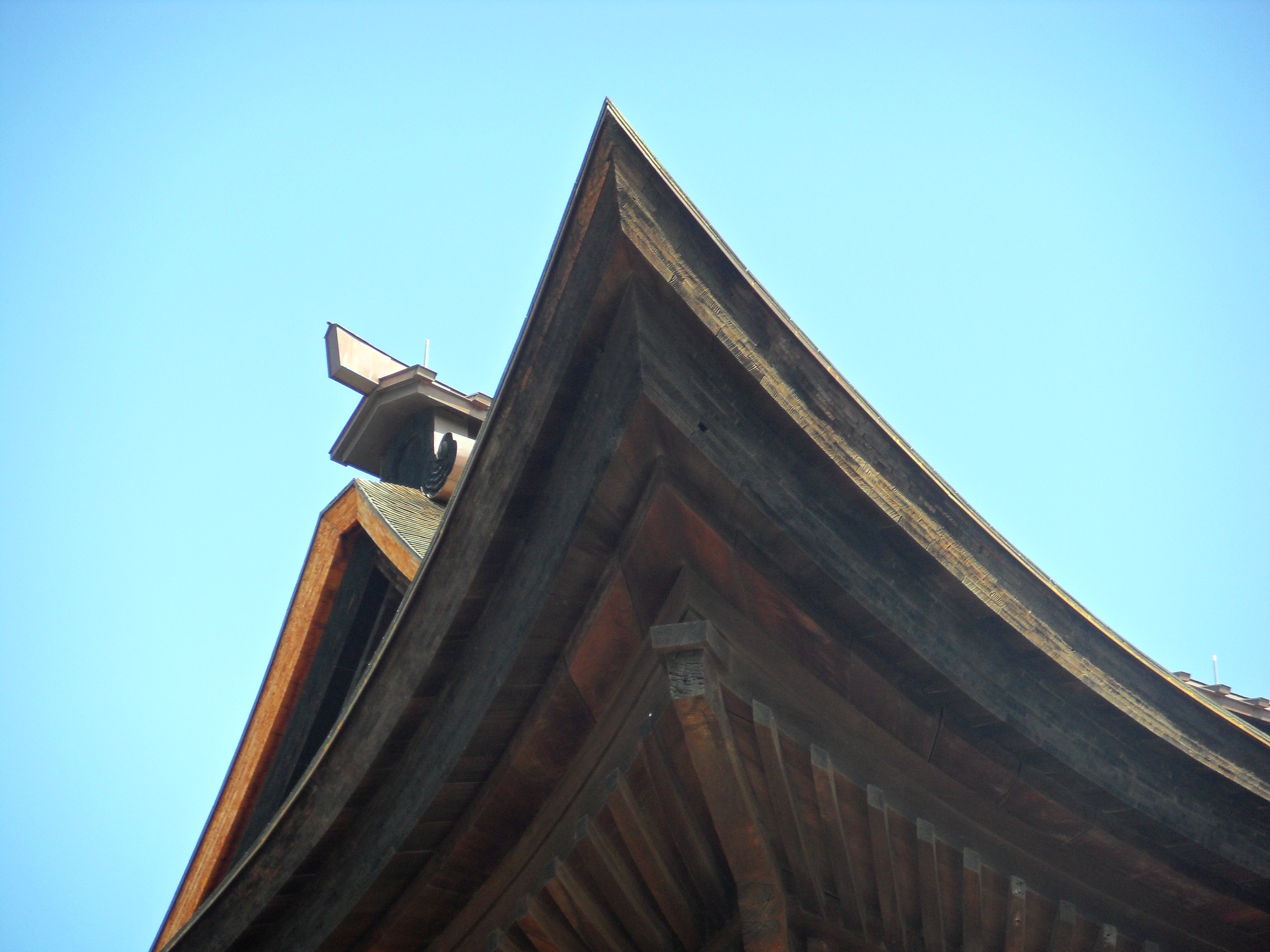
Exterior Eave detail

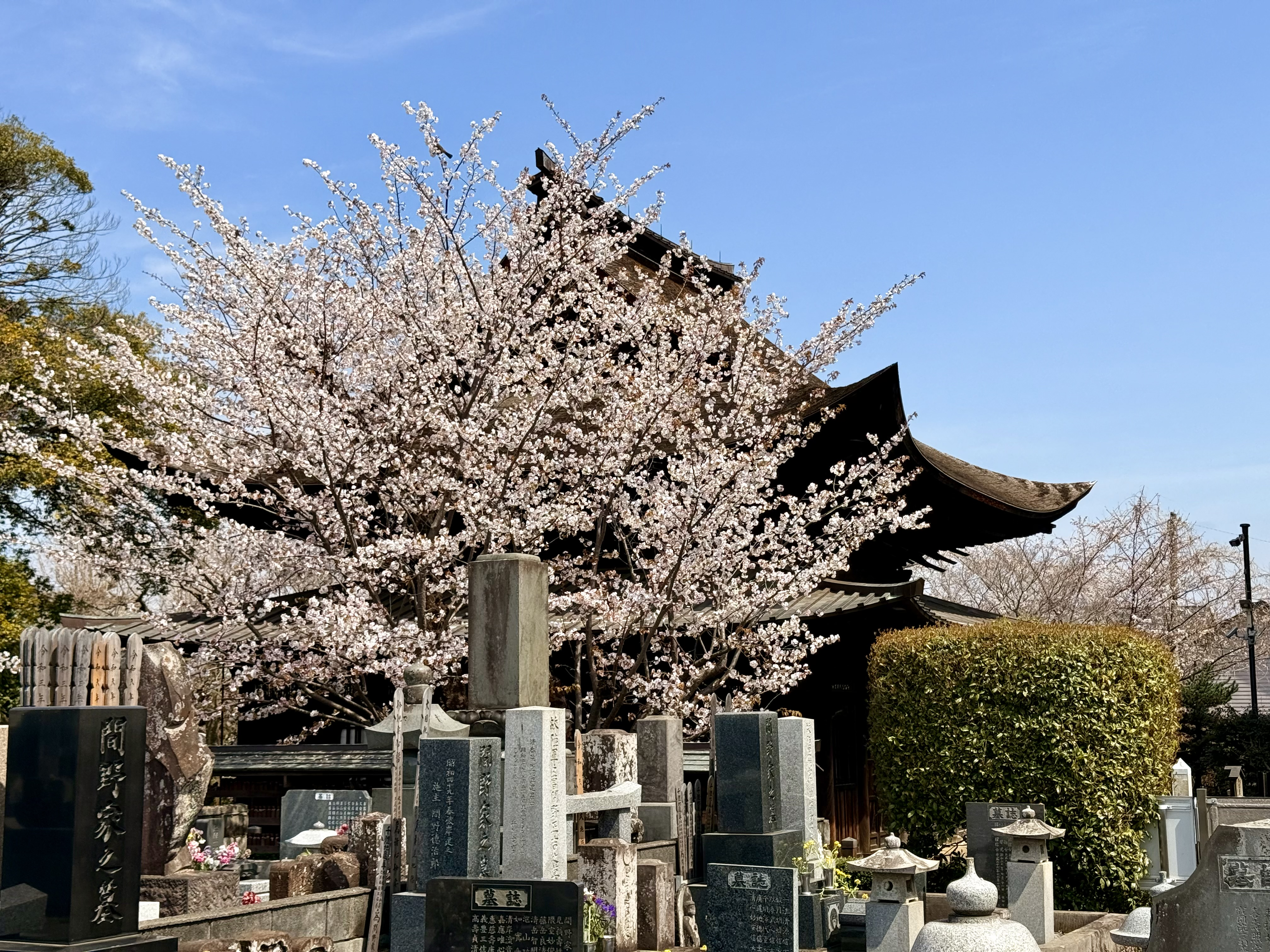
Sakura cherry blossoms above graveyard with the Jizo Hall behind

== See also ==
- Glossary of Japanese Buddhism – terms concerning Japanese Buddhism, Buddhist art, and Buddhist temple architecture
