= Dochū-Kōtsu Prefectural Natural Park =

Natural park of Tokushima prefecture, Japan

- 土柱高越県立自然公園
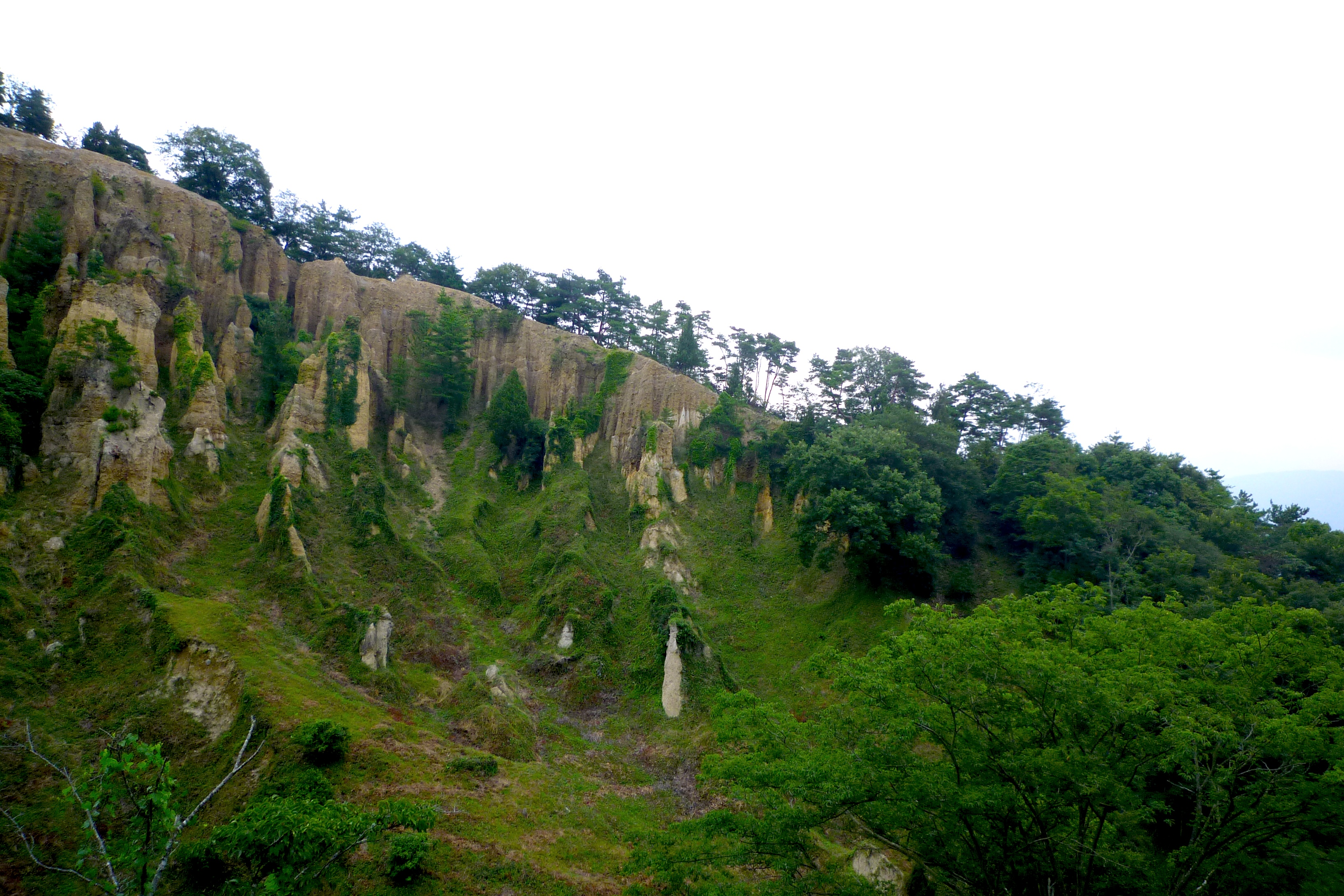
- Awa-no-Dochū (Natural Monument)
- Interactive map of Dochū-Kōtsu Prefectural Natural Park
- Location: Tokushima Prefecture, Japan
- Area: 14.18 km^{2} (5.47 sq mi)
- Established: 1 April 2005

Dochū-Kōtsu Prefectural Natural Park (土柱高越県立自然公園, Dochū-Kōtsu kenritsu shizen kōen) is a Prefectural Natural Park in northern Tokushima Prefecture, Japan. Established in 2005, the park encompasses a stretch of the Yoshino River, Mount Kōtsu (高越山), the temple of Kōtsu-ji (高越寺) and the earth pillars of Awa-no-Dochū (阿波の土柱).

== See also ==
- National Parks of Japan
