= Awa, Tokushima =

Awa 阿波市
- City
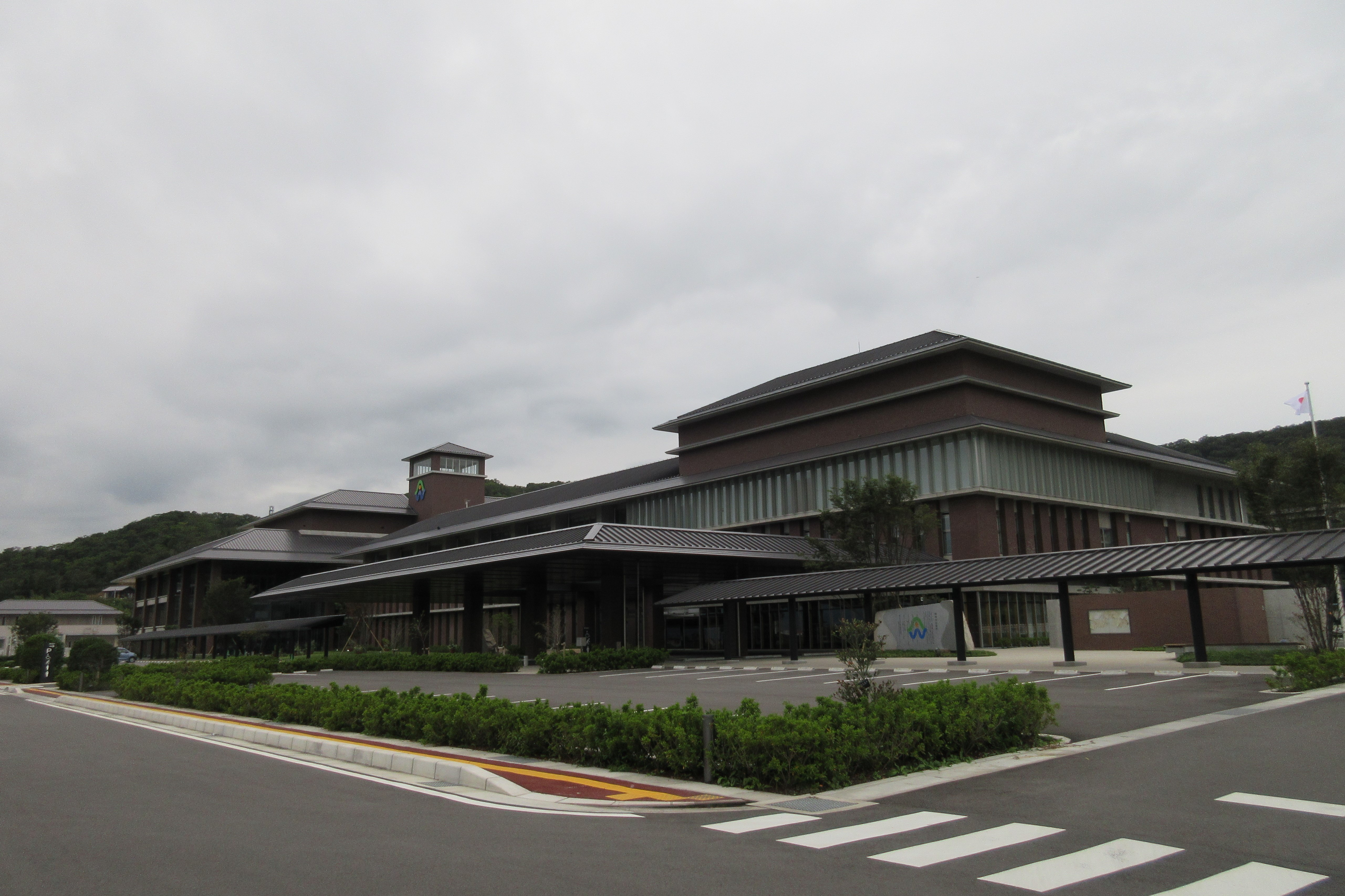
- Awa City Hall

- Flag Emblem
- Interactive map of Awa
- Location in Japan
- Coordinates: 34°6′5″N 134°17′47″E
- Country: Japan
- Region: Shikoku
- Prefecture: Tokushima

Government
  - Mayor: Kunikatsu Nozaki (since May 2009)

Area
  - Total: 191.11 km^{2} (73.79 sq mi)

Population (June 30, 2022)
  - Total: 35,631
  - Density: 186.44/km^{2} (482.88/sq mi)
- Time zone: UTC+09:00 (JST)
- City hall address: Awacho, Higashihara 173, Awa-shi, Tokushima-ken 771–1703
- Website: Official website
- Symbols
- Bird: Cettia diphone
- Flower: Cosmos
- Tree: Zelkova serrata

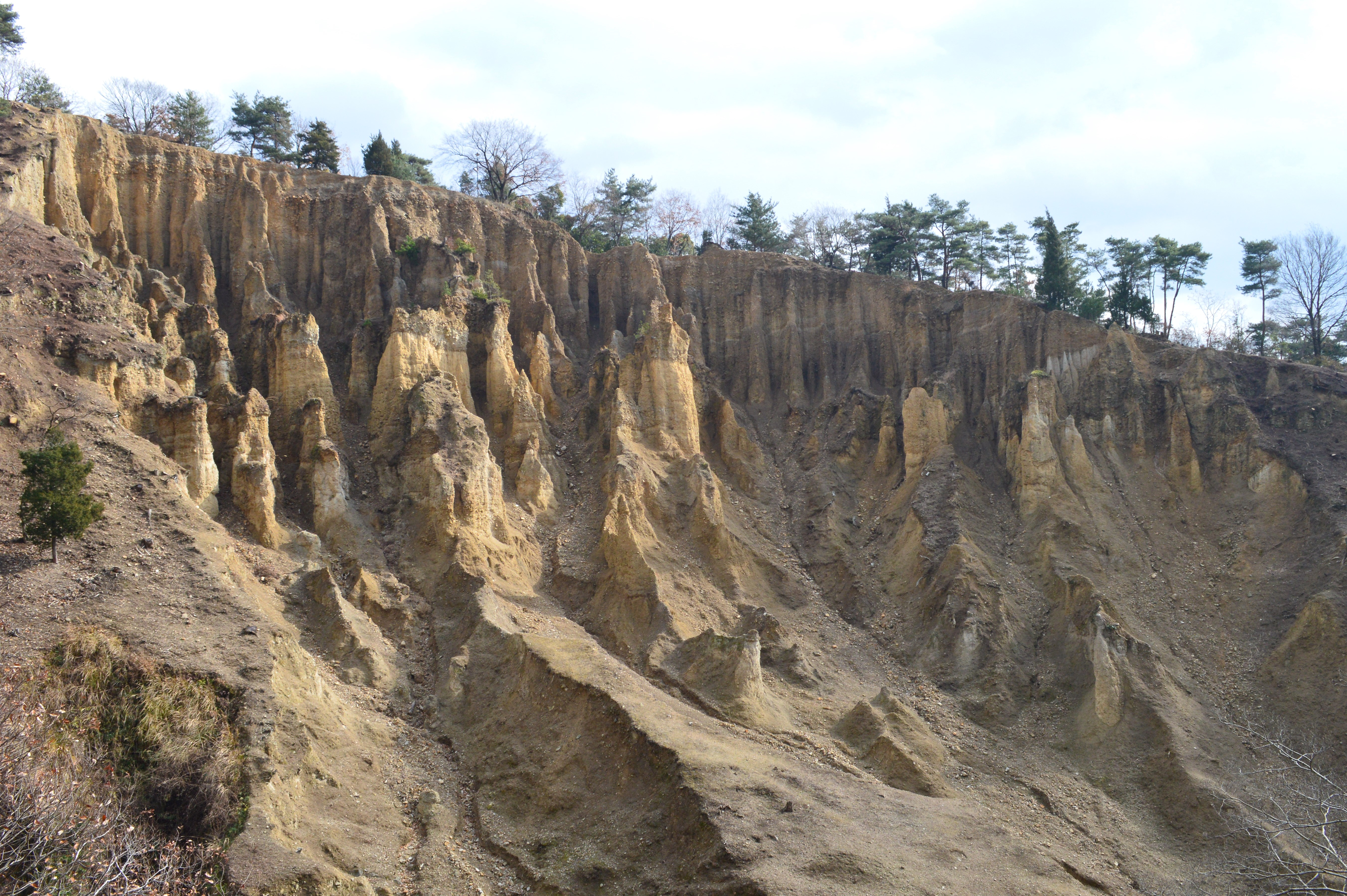
Awa-no-dochu earthen pillars Natural Monument

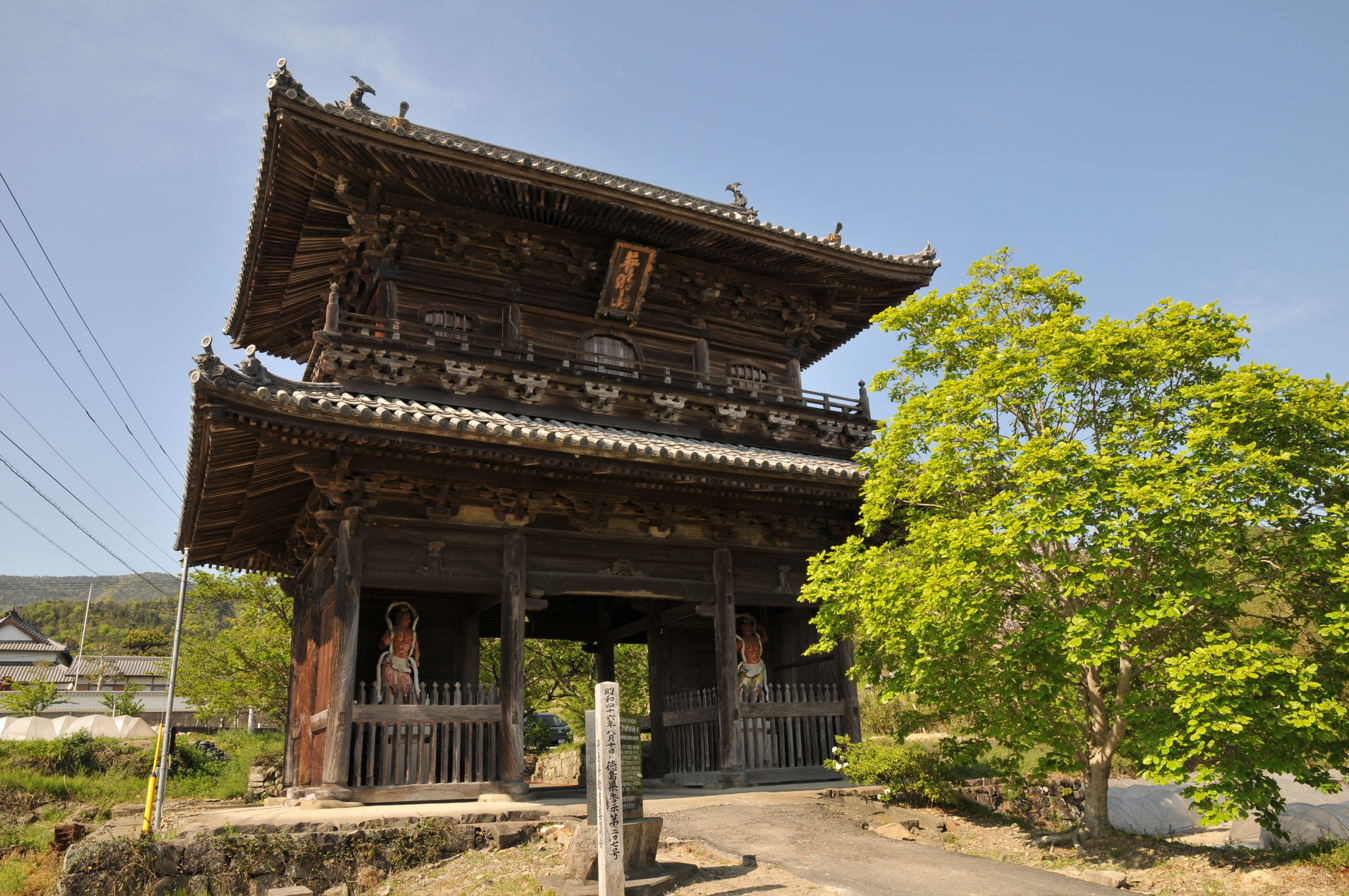
Kumadani-ji Sanmon

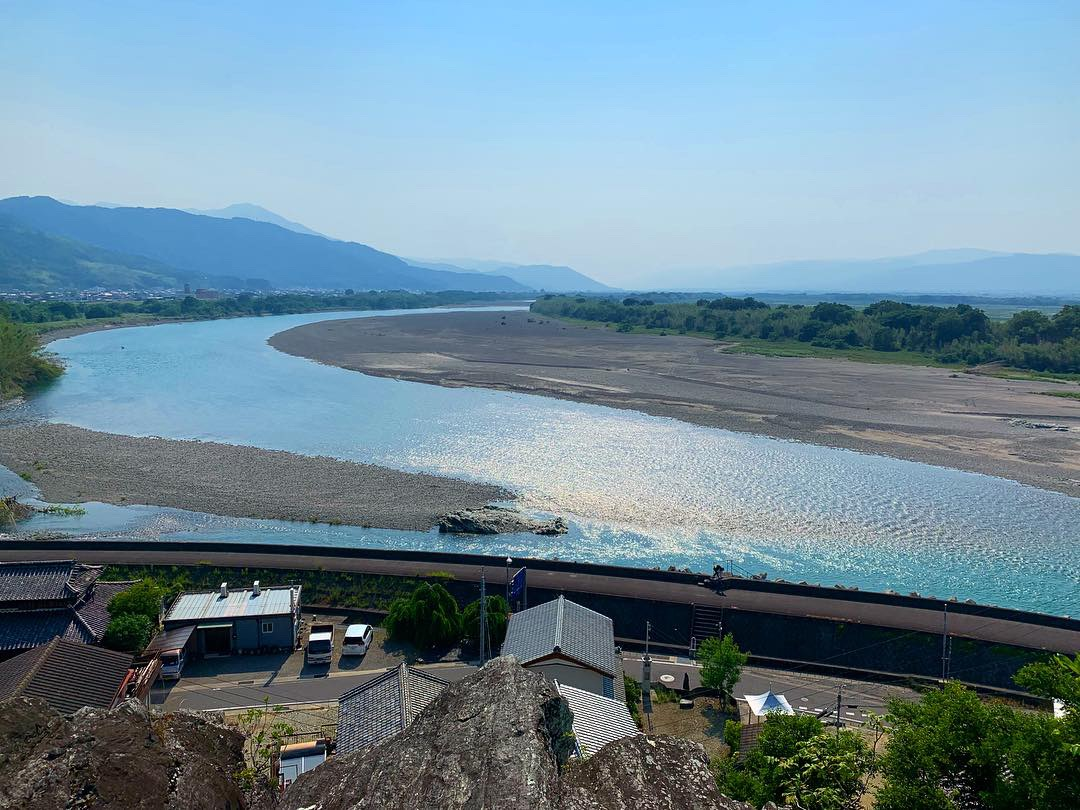
Yoshino River

Awa (阿波市, Awa-shi; Japanese pronunciation: [ä́.β̞ä̀, ä̀.β̞ä́(.ɕì)]) is a city located in Tokushima Prefecture, Japan. As of 30 June 2022, the city had an estimated population of 35,631 in 15432 households and a population density of 190 persons per km^{2}. The total area of the city is 191.11 square kilometres (73.79 sq mi).

== Geography ==
Awa is located in the northeastern part of Tokushima Prefecture, between the northern bank of the Yoshino River and Kagawa Prefecture. Parts of the city are within the borders of the Okumiyagawa-Uchidani Prefectural Natural Park.

=== Neighbouring municipalities ===
Kagawa Prefecture

- Higashikagawa
- Sanuki

Tokushima Prefecture

- Kamiita
- Mima
- Yoshinogawa

=== Climate ===
Awa has a humid subtropical climate (Köppen Cfa) characterized by warm summers and cool winters with light to no snowfall. The average annual temperature in Awa is 14.9 °C. The average annual rainfall is 1,335 mm with September as the wettest month.

== Demographics ==
Per Japanese census data, the population of Awa has slowly declined over the past 60 years.

Historical population
| Year | Pop. | ±% |
|---|---|---|
| 1960 | 49,968 | — |
| 1970 | 42,491 | −15.0% |
| 1980 | 43,823 | +3.1% |
| 1990 | 43,304 | −1.2% |
| 2000 | 42,388 | −2.1% |
| 2010 | 39,255 | −7.4% |

== History ==
As with all of Tokushima Prefecture, the area of Awa was part of ancient Awa Province. The Yoshino River valley was settled since at least the Kofun period, and archaeologists have found many kofun burial mounds. During the Edo period, the area was part of the holdings of Tokushima Domain ruled by the Hachisuka clan from their seat at Tokushima Castle. Following the Meiji restoration, it was organized into villages within Awa District and Itano District, Tokushima with the creation of the modern municipalities system on October 1, 1889. The villages of Hisakatsu, Isawa and Hayashi were founded within Awa District on October 1, 1889. Hayashi was raised to town status on November 1, 1928, and Hisakatsu on November 3, 1951. Hayashi, Hisakatsu and Isawa merged to form the town of Awa on March 31, 1955. The city of Awa was established on April 1, 2005, from the merger of the former town of Awa, absorbing the town of Ichiba from Awa District, and the towns of Donari and Yoshino (from Itano District).

== Government ==
Awa has a mayor-council form of government with a directly elected mayor and a unicameral city council of 20 members. Awa contributes two members to the Tokushima Prefectural Assembly. In terms of national politics, the city is part of Tokushima 2nd district of the lower house of the Diet of Japan.

== Economy ==
The economy of Awa is primarily agricultural.

== Education ==
Awa has ten public elementary schools and four public middle schools operated by the city government and two public middle school and four public high schools operated by the Tokushima Prefectural Department of Education.

== Transportation ==
=== Railway ===
Awa has no passenger railway service. Awa-Kawashima Station is closest to the city hall, Awa-Yamakawa Station is close to center of former Awa town, and Kamojima Station is closest to the center of both former Donari and Yoshino towns.

=== Highways ===
- Tokushima Expressway
- National Route 318

== Local attractions ==
- Awa-no-dochū. Natural Monument
- Hōrin-ji, 9th temple on the Shikoku Pilgrimage
- Jūraku-ji, 7th temple on the Shikoku Pilgrimage
- Kirihata-ji, 10th temple on the Shikoku Pilgrimage
- Kumadani-ji, 8th temple on the Shikoku Pilgrimage
- Okumiyagawa-Uchidani Prefectural Natural Park

== Noted people from Awa ==
- Takeo Miki, Prime Minister of Japan
- Kazuo Sakamaki, Imperial Japanese Navy officer
