= Kirihata-ji (Awa) =

Shingon temple in Tokushima Prefecture, Japan

Coordinates: 34°6′27.9″N 134°18′15.4″E

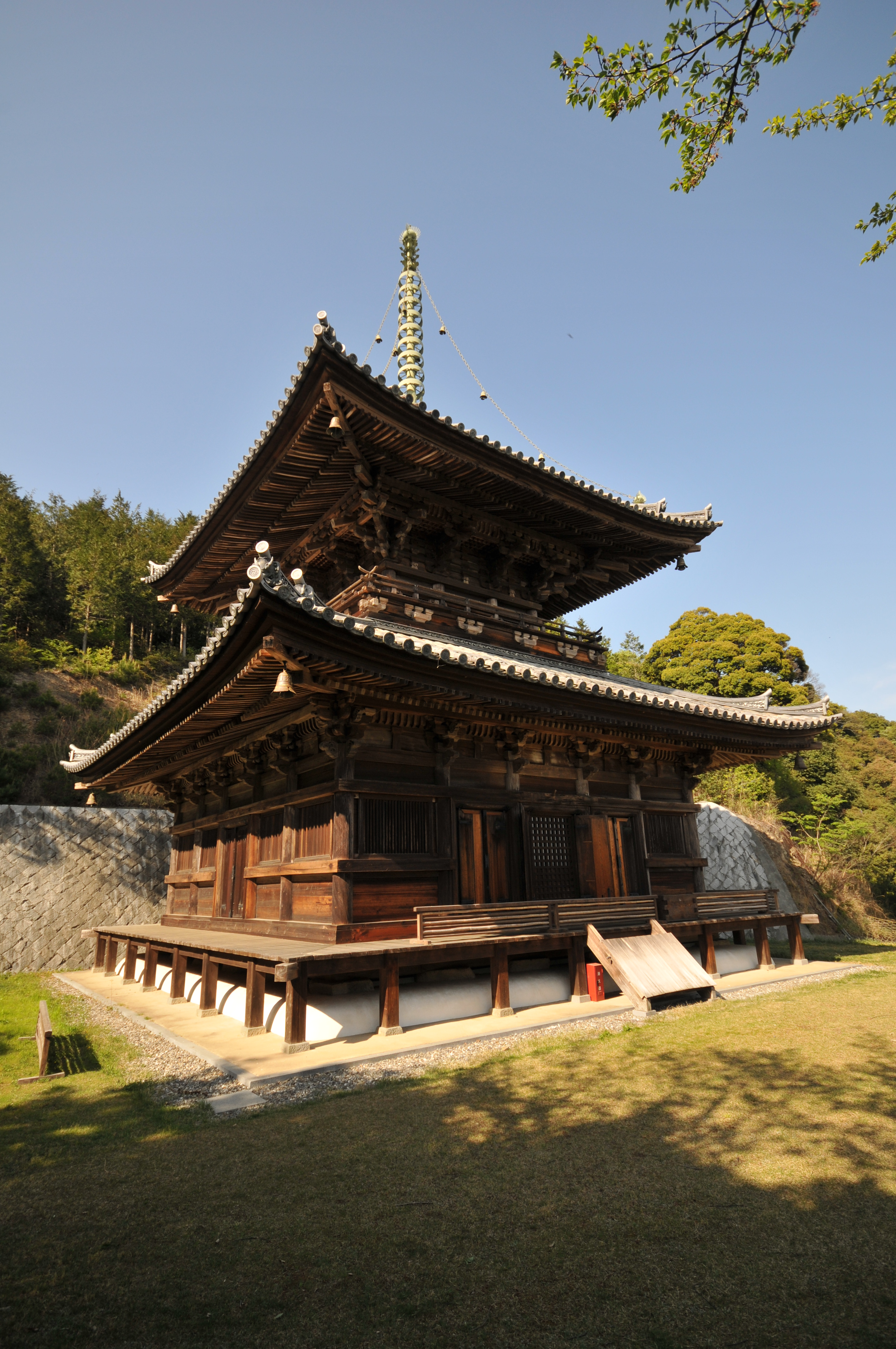
Daitō (1618), an Important Cultural Property

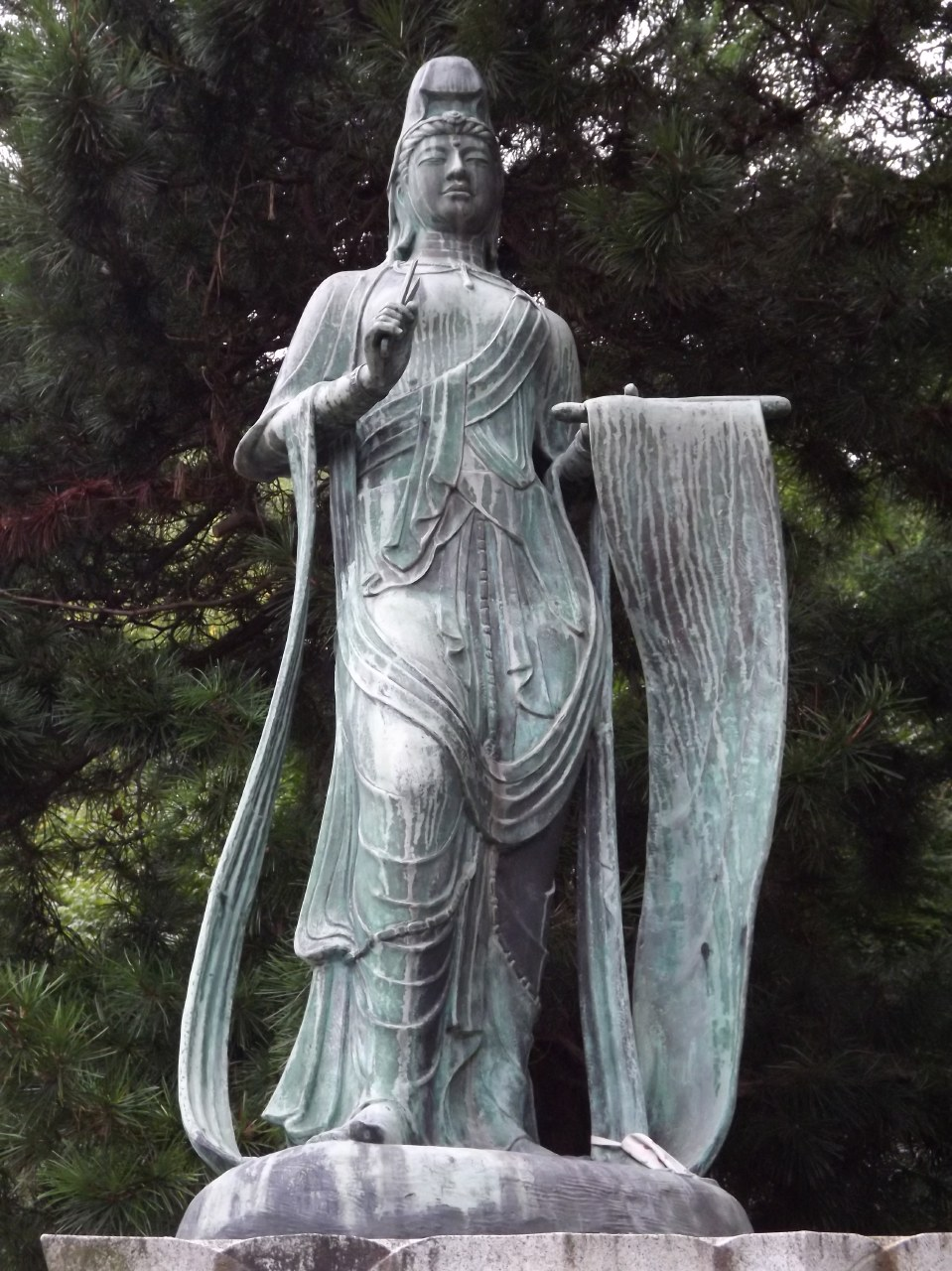
Guanyin

Kirihata-ji (切幡寺) is a Kōya-san Shingon temple in Awa, Tokushima Prefecture, Japan. Kirihata-ji is Temple 10 on the Shikoku 88 temple pilgrimage, featuring the main image of Senjū Kannon. The temple is said to have been founded by Kōbō Daishi, who carved the image.

The five-bay, two-storey Daitō of 1618 has been designated an Important Cultural Property.

== See also ==
- Important Cultural Properties of Japan
- Shikoku 88 temple pilgrimage
