= Hōrin-ji (Awa) =

Coordinates: 34°6′15.76″N 134°20′1.73″E

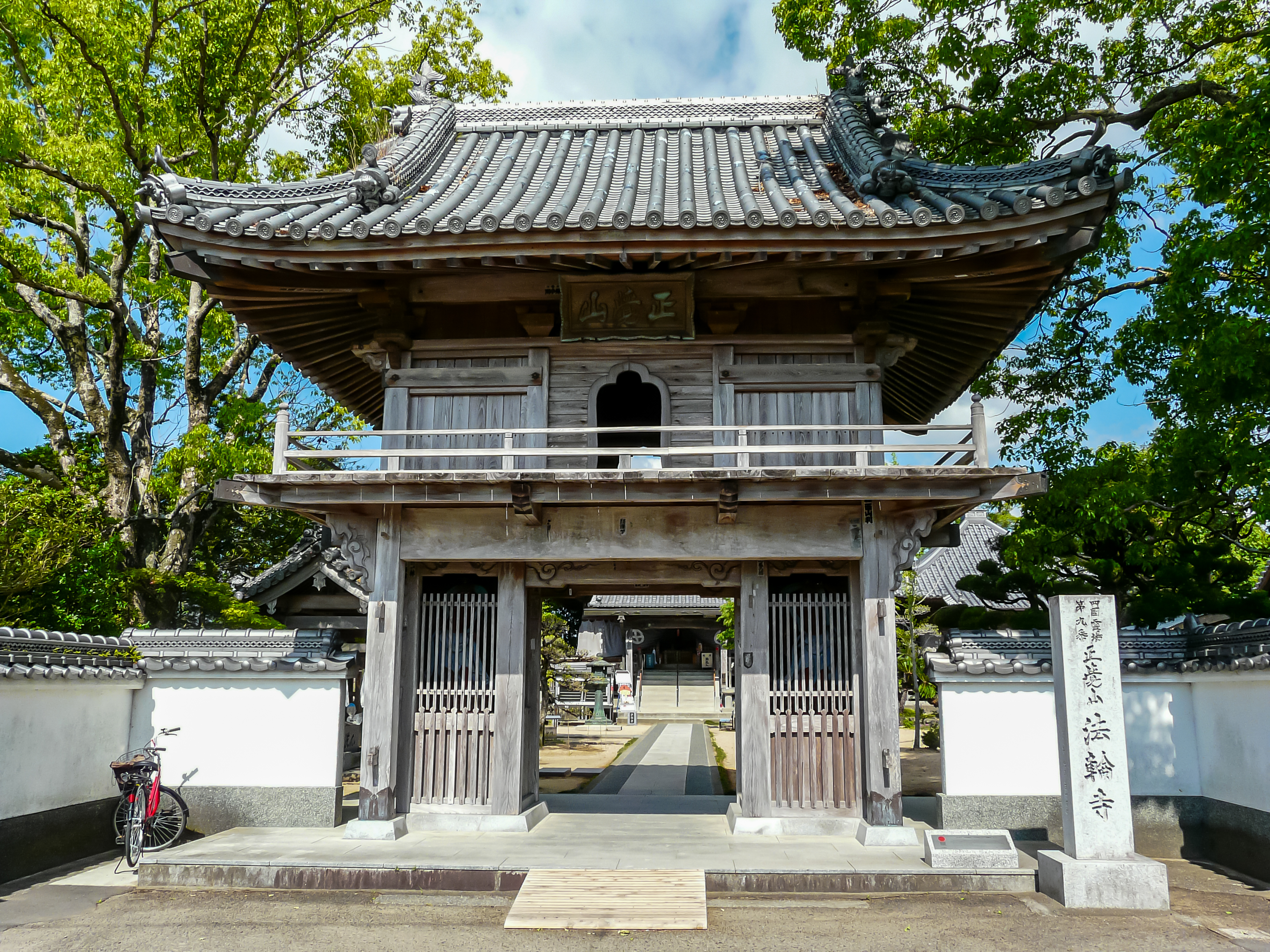
Gate leading to Hōrin-ji

Hōrin-ji (法輪寺) is a Kōya-san Shingon temple in Awa, Tokushima Prefecture, Japan. Temple 9 on the Shikoku 88 temple pilgrimage, the main image is of Parinirvana Shaka Nyorai. The temple is said to have been founded by Kōbō Daishi, who carved the image.

== See also ==
- Shikoku 88 temple pilgrimage
