= List of cultural properties of Japan – structures (Tokushima) =

This list is of the cultural properties of Japan designated in the category of structures (建造物, kenzōbutsu) for the Prefecture of Tokushima.

== National Cultural Properties ==
As of 1 January 2015, seventeen Important Cultural Properties with thirty-seven component structures have been designated, being of national significance.

Property	Date	Municipality	Comments	Image	Coordinates	Ref.
Aihara Family Residence 粟飯原家住宅; Aihara-ke jūtaku	1710	Kamiyama			33°57′55″N 134°19′34″E	
Ichinomiya Jinja Honden 一宮神社本殿; Ichinomiya Jinja honden	1630	Tokushima			34°02′16″N 134°27′45″E	
Ushihiko Jinja Honden 宇志比古神社本殿; Ushihiko Jinja honden	1599	Naruto			34°09′44″N 134°32′13″E	
Former Nagaoka Family Residence 旧長岡家住宅 kyū-Nagaoka-ke jūtaku	1735	Mima			34°04′12″N 134°09′20″E	
Mikawa Family Residence 三河家住宅; Mikawa-ke jūtaku	1928	Tokushima			34°03′59″N 134°33′22″E	
Miki Family Residence 三木家住宅; Miki-ke jūtaku	1615-60	Mima			33°57′51″N 134°12′21″E	
Kōne Family Residence 小采家住宅; Kōne-ke jūtaku	1804-43	Miyoshi			33°52′08″N 133°58′47″E	
Jōroku-ji Kannondō 丈六寺観音堂; Jōrokuji Kannondō	1648	Tokushima			34°00′17″N 134°33′03″E	
Jōroku-ji Kyōzō 丈六寺経蔵(旧僧堂); Jōrokuji kyōzō (kyū-sōdō)	1644	Tokushima			34°00′18″N 134°33′04″E	
Jōroku-ji Sanmon 丈六寺三門; Jōrokuji sanmon	late Muromachi period	Tokushima			34°00′19″N 134°33′05″E	
Jōroku-ji Hondō 丈六寺本堂(元方丈); Jōrokuji (moto hōjō)	1629	Tokushima			34°00′19″N 134°33′03″E	
Kirihata-ji Daitō 切幡寺大塔; Kirihata daitō	1618	Awa			34°06′29″N 134°18′13″E	
Tanaka Family Residence 田中家住宅; Tanaka-ke jūtaku	1685	Kamikatsu			33°52′30″N 134°21′05″E	
Tanaka Family Residence 田中家住宅; Tanaka-ke jūtaku	Bakumatsu to early Meiji period	Ishii	designation comprises eleven components: main building (1865), zashiki (1885), treasury (1859), front gate and storehouse (1870), indigo storehouse (1887), south (1860) and north (1873) indigo processing areas, and miso room, lodge, and ash store (early Meiji period)		34°05′25″N 134°26′47″E	
Hashikura-ji 箸蔵寺; Hashikuraji	end of Edo period	Miyoshi	designation comprises six components: honden (1830–67), hōjō (1856), and gomaden, Yakushidō, shōrōdō, and Tenjinja honden (1861)		34°02′57″N 133°50′30″E	
Fukunaga Family Residence 福永家住宅; Fukunaga-ke jūtaku	1818-1909	Naruto	designation comprises six components: main building (1828), detached zashiki (1832), storehouse (1833), barn and firewood storehouse (1818–43), and salt storehouse (1909)		34°12′20″N 134°35′21″E	
Kimura Family Residence 木村家住宅; Kimura-ke jūtaku	1699	Miyoshi			33°51′57″N 133°51′59″E	

== Prefectural Cultural Properties ==
As of 19 December 2014, sixteen properties have been designated at a prefectural level.

Property	Date	Municipality	Comments	Image	Coordinates	Ref.
Jizō-ji Genkan and Shoin 地蔵寺玄関及び書院; Jizōji genkan oyobi shoin		Komatsushima			34°00′29″N 134°34′56″E	for all refs see
Kakurin-ji Three-Storey Pagoda 鶴林寺三重塔; Kakurinji sanjū-no-tō	1827	Katsuura			34°00′29″N 134°34′56″E	
Chikurin-in Thirteen-Storey Tō 竹林院十三層塔; Chikurin-in jūsan-sō-tō		Tokushima			34°00′29″N 134°34′56″E	
Jōroku-ji Shoin 丈六寺書院附棟札一枚; Jōrokuji shoin tsuketari munafuda ichimai		Tokushima			34°00′19″N 134°33′03″E	
Jōroku-ji Tokuunin 丈六寺徳雲院附棟札一枚; Jōrokuji Tokuunin tsuketari munafuda ichimai		Tokushima			34°00′19″N 134°33′03″E	
Kumadani-ji Niomon 熊谷寺仁王門 (山門); Kumadaniji Niōmon (Sanmon)		Awa			34°07′15″N 134°20′24″E	
Okumura Family Residence 奥村家住宅; Okumura-ke jūtaku	1866	Aizumi	designation with thirteen components		34°06′56″N 134°28′57″E	
Kawahito Family Nagayamon 川人家長屋門; Kawahito-ke nagayamon	1772-81	Miyoshi			34°02′37″N 133°47′50″E	
Asa Family Residence 阿佐家住宅一棟及び屋敷林、庭園、石垣、石段、前庭を含む屋敷構え附棟札一枚; Asa-ke jūtaku ittō oyobi yashiki rin, teien, ishigaki, ishidan, zentei o fukumu yashiki kamae tsuketari munafuda ichi-mai		Miyoshi	designation includes forest, gardens, stone walls, stone steps, vestibule		33°50′41″N 133°54′06″E	
Kumadani-ji Daishidō 熊谷寺大師堂; Kumadaniji Daishidō		Awa			34°07′15″N 134°20′24″E	
Kumadani-ji Tahōtō 熊谷寺多宝塔; Kumadaniji Tahōtō		Awa			34°07′15″N 134°20′24″E	
Kumadani-ji Chūmon 熊谷寺中門; Kumadaniji Chūmon		Awa			34°07′15″N 134°20′24″E	
Kumadani-ji Shōrō 熊谷寺鐘楼; Kumadaniji Shōrō		Awa			34°07′15″N 134°20′24″E	
Miniature Shrine inside Kumadani-ji Daishidō 熊谷寺大師堂内厨子; Kumadaniji Daishidō nai zushi		Awa			34°07′15″N 134°20′24″E	
Hashikura-ji Kannondō 箸蔵寺観音堂; Hashikuraji Kannondō		Miyoshi			34°02′57″N 133°50′30″E	
Tokuzen Family Residence 徳善家住宅; Tokuzen-ke jūtaku	1866	Miyoshi			33°52′41″N 133°46′14″E	

== Municipal Cultural Properties ==
As of 1 May 2014, forty-two properties have been designated at a municipal level.

Property	Date	Municipality	Comments	Image	Coordinates	Ref.
Hachiman Jinja Zuishinmon 八幡神社随臣門; Hachiman Jinja zuishinmon		Tokushima			34°03′57″N 134°32′39″E	
Mishima Jinja Komainu 三島神社の狛犬; Mishima Jinja komainu		Tokushima			34°04′29″N 134°32′31″E	
Kannon-ji Hondō 観音寺本堂; Kannonji hondō		Tokushima			34°03′41″N 134°32′43″E	

== Registered Cultural Properties ==
As of 1 January 2015, one hundred and thirteen properties at forty-one sites have been registered (as opposed to designated) at a national level.

Property	Date	Municipality	Comments	Image	Coordinates	Ref.
Takahara Building 高原ビル; Takahara biru	1932	Tokushima			34°04′13″N 134°32′56″E	
Seigyoku Sake Company 勢玉 酒蔵A 酒蔵B 煙突 事務所棟; Seigyoku	late Meiji to early Shōwa period	Tokushima	four registrations: storehouses A and B (1902), chimney (1909), and office (early Shōwa period)		34°04′19″N 134°33′48″E	
Matsusaka Tunnel 松坂隧道; Matsusaka suidō	1921	Mugi	length of 87 metres (285 ft), width of 5.8 metres (19 ft)		33°39′33″N 134°23′53″E	
Taisan-ji 大山寺; Taisanji	mid to late Edo period	Kamiita	four registrations: hondō (mid-Edo period, relocated in 1796 and repaired in 1952 and 1985), Daishidō (1863, repaired 1985), corridor (late Edo period), and shōrōmon (late Edo period, repaired 1985)		34°09′33″N 134°23′59″E	
Hashikura-ji 箸蔵寺; Hashikuraji	early Meiji period	Miyoshi	four registrations: high tōrō (1884), chōzuya (1896), Niōmon (1880), and chūmon (early Meiji period)		34°02′57″N 133°50′30″E	

== See also ==
- Cultural Properties of Japan
- National Treasures of Japan
- List of Historic Sites of Japan (Tokushima)
