= List of cultural properties of Japan – archaeological materials (Tokushima) =

This list is of the cultural properties of Japan designated in the category of archaeological materials (考古資料, kōko shiryō) for the Prefecture of Tokushima.

== National Cultural Properties ==
As of 1 January 2015, three Important Cultural Properties have been designated, being of national significance.

Property	Date	Municipality	Ownership	Comments	Image	Coordinates	Ref.
Bronze Sutra Container 銅経筒 dō kyō-zutsu	1126	Kamiita	Taisan-ji	linked with the idea of mappō, the four-line inscription on the body reads "Daiji 1, Fire Horse, tenth month, twelfth day Wood Dragon / Jambudvipa, Japan, Awa Province, Taisan-ji / in observance of the law copying memorial sutras in fulfilment of his vows, the monk Saihan / in connection with the universe, the six realms, the three planes of existence, suffering" (大治元年歳次丙午十月十二日甲辰 / 閻浮提日本国阿州於大山寺 / 如法経書写供養畢願頌僧西範 / 為結縁法界六道三有受苦者也)		34°09′34″N 134°24′00″E	
Dōtaku with Tossen and Kesadasuki Design 突線袈裟襷文銅鐸／徳島県徳島市国府町矢野遺跡出土 tossen kesadasuki mon dōtaku Tokushima-ken Tokushima-shi Kokufu-chō Yano iseki shutsudo	Yayoi period	Itano	Tokushima Prefecture (kept at Tokushima Prefectural Buried Cultural Properties Research Centre)	excavated in Yano, Kokufu-chō, Tokushima; divided on front and back into six panels, framed within broad bands with lattice design, known as surplice design (袈裟襷文, kesadasuki mon), and with thick vertical and horizontal lines (突線, tossen)		34°08′34″N 134°27′05″E	
Dōtaku with Running Water Design 流水文銅鐸 ryūsui-mon dōtaku	Yayoi period	Tokushima	Tokushima Prefectural Museum	excavated in Suehiro, Yamaguchi-chō, Anan		34°02′24″N 134°31′35″E	

== Prefectural Cultural Properties ==
As of 19 December 2014, seventeen properties have been designated at a prefectural level.

Property	Date	Municipality	Ownership	Comments	Image	Coordinates	Ref.
Dōtaku with Kesadasuki Design 袈裟襷文銅鐸 (小松島市勢合出土) kesadasuki mon dōtaku	Yayoi period	Komatsushima	private (kept at Tokushima Prefectural Museum)	excavated in Seigō, Tano-chō, Komatsushima		34°02′24″N 134°31′35″E	for all refs see
Takagawara Stele 高川原の板碑; Takagawara no itabi		Ishii	Ishii Board of Education (kept at Shikichi Jinja (敷地神社))			34°04′55″N 134°27′32″E	
Ichiraku Stelai 市楽の板碑群; Ichiraku no itabi-gun	1285 onwards	Ishii	Ishii Board of Education (kept at Ishikawa Jinja (石川神社))	17 stelai, the oldest of which dates from 1285		34°04′37″N 134°27′35″E	
Itano Zōdani Tile Sutras 板野蔵佐谷瓦経; Itano Zōdani gakyō		Anan	private			33°54′26″N 134°36′52″E	
Excavated Artefacts from Takinomiya Sutra Mound 竜の宮経塚出土品; Takinomiya kyōzuka shutsudo-hin	Kamakura period	Mima	Mima Kyōdo Museum (美馬郷土博物館)	the assemblage comprises a bronze sutra container, without inscription, three Haji ware-like containers, four blue ceramic incense containers, a bronze washer, four swords, a mirror, and two stone objects of uncertain function		34°03′07″N 134°03′36″E	
Funerary Urns and related materials excavated at Hidonodani 樋殿谷出土蔵骨器関係資料; Hidonodani shutsudo zōkotsuki kankei shiryō		Tokushima	Tokushima Prefecture (kept at Tokushima Prefectural Museum)	18 items		34°02′24″N 134°31′35″E	
Dōtaku with Kesadasuki Design 袈裟襷文銅鐸 (徳島市安都真出土) kesadasuki mon dōtaku	Yayoi period	Tokushima	private (kept at Tokushima Prefectural Museum)	4 items; excavated in Azuma, Nyūta-chō, Tokushima		34°02′24″N 134°31′35″E	
Flat Bronze Swords 平型銅剣 (神山町東寺出土) hiragata dōken		Kamiyama	private (kept at Tokushima Prefectural Museum)	3 items; excavated at Tōji, Kamiyama		34°02′24″N 134°31′35″E	
Awa Kuni no Miyatsuko Tombstone 阿波国造墓碑; Awa no kuni-no-miyatsuko bohi		Ishii	Chūōshi Jinja (中王子神社)			34°03′25″N 134°26′36″E	
Dōtaku with Kesadasuki Design 袈裟襷文銅鐸 (徳島市名東遺跡出土) kesadasuki mon dōtaku	Yayoi period	Tokushima	Tokushima City Board of Education (kept at Tokushima Archaeological Museum)	excavated at the Meitō Site, Tokushima		34°03′39″N 134°28′09″E	
Dōtaku with Kesadasuki Design 袈裟襷文銅鐸 (三好市西祖谷山村榎鉾神社蔵) kesadasuki mon dōtaku	Yayoi period	Miyoshi	Hoko Jinja (鉾神社) (kept at Tokushima Prefectural Buried Cultural Properties Research Centre )			34°08′34″N 134°27′05″E	
Excavated Artefacts from Hagiwara Tumulus 1 萩原一号墓出土品; Hagiwara ichi-gō fun shutsudo-hin		Itano	Tokushima Prefecture (kept at Tokushima Prefectural Buried Cultural Properties Research Centre )			34°08′34″N 134°27′05″E	
Excavated Artefacts from Nishiyamadani Tumulus 2 西山谷二号墳出土品; Nishiyamadani ni-gō fun shutsudo-hin		Itano	Tokushima Prefecture (kept at Tokushima Prefectural Buried Cultural Properties Research Centre )			34°08′34″N 134°27′05″E	
Excavated Artefacts from Tumulus 2, Rengedani Kofun Cluster 蓮華谷古墳群(II)二号墳出土品; Rengedani kofun-gun (II) ni-gō fun shutsudo-hin		Itano	Tokushima Prefecture (kept at Tokushima Prefectural Buried Cultural Properties Research Centre )			34°08′34″N 134°27′05″E	
Excavated Artefacts from Kanegatani Site カネが谷遺跡出土品; Kanegatani iseki shutsudo-hin		Itano	Tokushima Prefecture (kept at Tokushima Prefectural Buried Cultural Properties Research Centre )	90 items		34°08′34″N 134°27′05″E	
Mokkan and Government Office-related excavated materials from Kannonji-Shijiki Site 観音寺・敷地遺跡木簡と官衙関連出土品; Kannonji・Shikiji iseki mokkan to kanga kanren shutsudo-hin		Itano	Tokushima Prefecture (kept at Tokushima Prefectural Buried Cultural Properties Research Centre )	500 items		34°08′34″N 134°27′05″E	
Earthen Mask from Yano Site 矢野遺跡土製仮面; Yano iseki dosei kamen	late Jōmon period	Itano	Tokushima Prefecture (kept at Tokushima Prefectural Buried Cultural Properties Research Centre )	1 item		34°08′34″N 134°27′05″E	

== See also ==
- Cultural Properties of Japan
- List of National Treasures of Japan (archaeological materials)
- List of Historic Sites of Japan (Tokushima)
- List of Cultural Properties of Japan - historical materials (Tokushima)
