= List of cultural properties of Japan – paintings (Tokushima) =

This list is of the cultural properties of Japan designated in the category of paintings (絵画, kaiga) for the Prefecture of Tokushima.

== National Cultural Properties ==
As of 1 January 2015, six Important Cultural Properties have been designated, being of national significance.

Property	Date	Municipality	Ownership	Comments	Image	Dimensions	Coordinates	Ref.
Hosokawa Shigeyuki, colour on silk 絹本著色細川成之像 kenpon chakushoku Hosokawa Shigeyuki zō	Muromachi period	Tokushima	Jōroku-ji (丈六寺))			74.0 centimetres (2 ft 5.1 in) by 31.1 centimetres (1 ft 0.2 in)	34°00′17″N 134°33′04″E	
Water-Moon Avalokiteśvara, colour on silk 絹本著色楊柳観音像 kenpon chakushoku Yōryū Kannon zō	Goryeo	Miyoshi	Chōraku-ji (長楽寺))	Goryeo Buddhist painting		119.0 centimetres (3 ft 10.9 in) by 63.5 centimetres (2 ft 1.0 in)	34°01′48″N 133°51′44″E	
Shaka Triad, colour on silk 絹本著色釈迦三尊像 kenpon chakushoku Shaka sanzon zō	Kamakura period	Komatsushima	Tatsuei-ji (立江寺) (kept at Kyoto National Museum)				34°59′24″N 135°46′23″E	
Nirvana painting, colour on silk 絹本著色仏涅槃図 kenpon chakushoku Butsu nehan zu	Kamakura period	Yoshinogawa	Kōtsū-ji (高越寺) (kept at Kyoto National Museum)			154.5 centimetres (5 ft 0.8 in) by 120.0 centimetres (3 ft 11.2 in)	34°59′24″N 135°46′23″E	
Vajrasattva and Monju Bosatsu, colour on silk 絹本著色金剛薩埵像 絹本著色文殊菩薩像 kenpon chakushoku Kongōsatta zō kenpon chakushoku Monju bosatsu zō	Kamakura period	Higashimiyoshi	Chōzen-ji (長善寺) (kept at Kyoto National Museum)	two scrolls			34°59′24″N 135°46′23″E	
Descent of the Heavenly Retinue, colour on silk 絹本著色聖衆来迎図 kenpon chakushoku Shōjū raigō zu	Kamakura period	Miyoshi	Unpen-ji (雲辺寺) (kept at Nara National Museum)				34°41′01″N 135°50′12″E	

== Prefectural Cultural Properties ==
As of 19 December 2014, twenty-nine properties have been designated at a prefectural level.

Property	Date	Municipality	Ownership	Comments	Image	Dimensions	Coordinates	Ref.
Dragon and Clouds, by Kanō Motonobu 狩野元信筆雲龍; Kanō Motonobu hitsu unryū	late Muromachi period	Komatsushima	private				33°59′34″N 134°36′12″E	for all refs see
Miyoshi Motonaga, colour on silk 絹本著色三好長基像 kenpon chakushoku Miyoshi Motonaga zō	1533	Aizumi	Kenshō-ji (見性寺)				34°07′55″N 134°31′23″E	
Miyoshi Yukinaga, colour on silk 絹本著色三好長輝像 kenpon chakushoku Miyoshi Yukinaga zō	1526	Aizumi	Kenshō-ji (見性寺)			71 centimetres (2 ft 4 in) by 37 centimetres (1 ft 3 in)	34°07′55″N 134°31′23″E	
Amida Raigō, colour on silk 絹本著色阿弥陀尊来迎図 kenpon chakushoku Amida mikoto raigō zō	Kamakura period	Naruto	Tōrin-in			82 centimetres (2 ft 8 in) by 39 centimetres (1 ft 3 in)	34°09′41″N 134°32′10″E	
Crossing Shinmachi Bridge 新町橋渡初之図; Shinmachi-bashi watarizome no zu	C19	Tokushima	private (kept at Tokushima Castle Museum)	by Morizumi Kangyo (守住貫魚)		115 centimetres (3 ft 9 in) by 84 centimetres (2 ft 9 in)	34°04′25″N 134°33′21″E	
Peacock with Peach Blossoms - Xi Wangmu - Peahen with Peonies 絹本著色桃花孔雀雄・西王母・牡丹孔雀雌図 kenpon chakushoku momo-ka kujaku-osu・Seiōbo・botan kujaku-mesu zu		Komatsushima	private	3 scrolls			34°00′28″N 134°35′01″E	
Descent of the Heavenly Retinue, colour on silk 絹本著色聖衆来迎図 kenpon chakushoku Shōjū raigō zu	Kamakura period	Mima	Ganshō-ji (願勝寺)			163.0 centimetres (5 ft 4.2 in) by 104.5 centimetres (3 ft 5.1 in)	34°03′08″N 134°03′33″E	
Senju Kannon, colour on silk 絹本著色千手観音像 kenpon chakushoku senju Kannon zō	Kamakura period	Naruto	Shōkō-ji (正興寺)			111.9 centimetres (3 ft 8.1 in) by 51.3 centimetres (1 ft 8.2 in)	34°10′41″N 134°36′01″E	
Sixteen Benevolent Deities, colour on silk 絹本著色十六善神像 kenpon chakushoku jūroku zenjin zō		Yoshinogawa	Gyokurin-ji (玉林寺)				34°03′06″N 134°22′17″E	
Hachisuka Family's Meisho from All over the Country, emaki 蜂須賀家旧蔵全国名勝絵巻; Hachisuka-ke kyūzō zenkoku meishō emaki	1844	Tokushima	Tokushima Prefecture (kept at Tokushima Prefectural Museum)	10 scrolls; by Morizumi Kangyo (守住貫魚)			34°02′22″N 134°31′34″E	
Jizō Raigō, colour on silk 絹本著色地蔵来迎図 kenpon chakushoku Jizō raigō zu		Katsuura	Kakurin-ji (鶴林寺)				33°54′50″N 134°30′20″E	
Mount Iya, emaki 祖谷山絵巻; Iya-yama emaki	1828	Tokushima	Tokushima Prefecture (kept at Tokushima Prefectural Museum)	2 scrolls; by Watanabe Hiroteru (渡辺広輝)			34°02′22″N 134°31′34″E	
Autumn Grass, colour on paper with gold ground (fusuma) 紙本金地著色秋草図（襖貼図） shihon kinji chakushoku aki kusa zu (fusuma ha zu)		Anan	Byōdō-ji (平等寺)	4 panels			33°51′06″N 134°34′58″E	
Senju Kannon 千手観音像; Senju Kannon zō		Awa	Jingū-ji (神宮寺)	3 scrolls			34°07′18″N 134°21′02″E	
Kōkaku Jōkō's Ceremonial Visit to the Shugaku-in 光格上皇修学院御幸儀仗図; Kōkaku Jōkō Shūgakuin gokō gijō zu	C19	Tokushima	Tokushima Prefecture (kept at Tokushima Prefectural Museum)	3 scrolls			34°02′22″N 134°31′34″E	
Mandala of the Two Realms 両界曼荼羅 ryōkai mandara	Nanboku-chō period	Naruto	Gokuraku-ji	pair of scrolls		157 centimetres (5 ft 2 in) by 107 centimetres (3 ft 6 in)	34°09′20″N 134°29′25″E	
Jizō Raigō 地蔵来迎図; Jizō raigō zu	Kamakura period	Mima	Saimyō-ji (最明寺) (kept at Tokushima Prefectural Museum)			81.6 centimetres (2 ft 8.1 in) by 35.3 centimetres (1 ft 1.9 in)	34°02′22″N 134°31′34″E	
Aizen Myōō, colour on silk 絹本著色愛染明王像 kenpon chakushoku Aizen Myōō zō	Muromachi period	Tsurugi	Jingū-ji (神宮寺)			93.8 centimetres (3 ft 0.9 in) by 35.7 centimetres (1 ft 2.1 in)	34°01′47″N 134°02′01″E	
Womb Realm Mandala 胎蔵界曼荼羅図 taizōkai mandara zu		Komatsushima	Jizō-ji (地蔵寺)				34°00′29″N 134°34′56″E	
Mandala of the Two Realms 両界曼荼羅図 ryōkai mandara zu		Komatsushima	private	pair of scrolls			33°59′03″N 134°35′16″E	
Thirteen Buddhas 十三仏図 jūsan Butsu	Nanboku-chō period	Tsurugi	Tōfuku-ji (神宮寺)			94.5 centimetres (3 ft 1.2 in) by 40.0 centimetres (1 ft 3.7 in)	34°00′11″N 134°04′40″E	
Descent of Amida Triad, colour on silk 絹本著色阿弥陀三尊来迎図 kenpon chakushoku Amida sanzo raigō zu	Muromachi period	Ishii	Jōdo-ji (浄土寺)			93 centimetres (3 ft 1 in) by 45 centimetres (1 ft 6 in)	34°03′33″N 134°25′57″E	
Tosotsuten Mandala, colour on silk 絹本著色伝兜率天曼荼羅図 kenpon chakushoku den-Tosotsuten mandara zu		Ishii	Jōdo-ji (浄土寺)				34°03′33″N 134°25′57″E	
Taishakuten Mandala, colour on hemp 麻布著色伝帝釈天曼荼羅図 azabu chakushoku den-Taishakuten mandara zu		Kamiyama	Zenkaku-ji (善覚寺)				33°58′18″N 134°22′19″E	
Yanagi-Bashi Water Wheel, six-panel byōbu 柳橋水車図六曲屏風 ryūkyō suisha zu rokkyoku byōbu	early Edo period	Tokushima	Tokushima City (kept at Tokushima Prefectural Museum)	pair of screens		327 centimetres (10 ft 9 in) by 151.3 centimetres (4 ft 11.6 in)	34°02′22″N 134°31′34″E	
Twelve Views of Naruto, emaki 鳴門十二勝真景図巻; Naruto jūni shō shinkei zu maki	1796	Tokushima	Tokushima City (kept at Tokushima Castle Museum)	by Suzuki Fuyō (鈴木芙蓉); commissioned by Hachisuka Haruaki			34°04′25″N 134°33′21″E	
Hachisuka Masakatsu 蜂須賀正勝画像; Hachisuka Masakatsu gazō	1586	Tokushima	Tokushima City (kept at Tokushima Castle Museum)				34°04′25″N 134°33′21″E	
Joseon Mission and Hachisuka Clan River Gozabune 朝鮮通信使蜂須賀家川御座船図; Chōsen tsūshinshi Hachisuka-ke kawa gozabune zu	1711-19	Tokushima	Tokushima City (kept at Tokushima Castle Museum)	2 paintings		173.5 centimetres (5 ft 8.3 in) by 59.3 centimetres (1 ft 11.3 in) and 77.1 centimetres (2 ft 6.4 in) by 59.2 centimetres (1 ft 11.3 in)	34°04′25″N 134°33′21″E	
Willow and Waterwheel - Paulownias, cedar doors 「柳に水車図・桐花図」杉戸絵 yanagi ni suisha zu・tōka zu sugido-e	1842	Tokushima	Tokushima City (kept at Tokushima Castle Museum)	pair of doors painted on both sides		164.5 centimetres (5 ft 4.8 in) by 83.9 centimetres (2 ft 9.0 in)	34°04′25″N 134°33′21″E	

== See also ==
- Cultural Properties of Japan
- List of National Treasures of Japan (paintings)
- Japanese painting
