= Tokushima Archaeological Museum =

- 徳島市立考古資料館
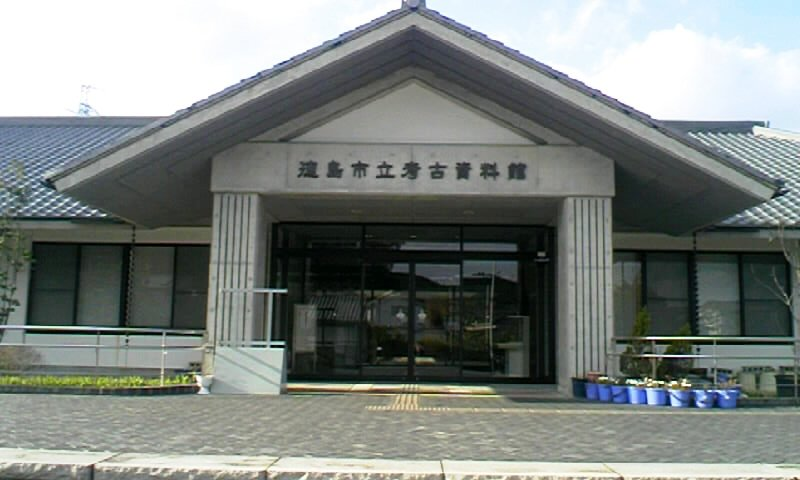
- Interactive map of the Tokushima Archaeological Museum area

General information
- Location: 10-1 Nishiyano, Kokufu-chō, Tokushima, Tokushima Prefecture, Japan
- Coordinates: 34°03′39″N 134°28′09″E
- Opened: November 1998

Website
- http://tokushima-kouko.jp/

Tokushima Archaeological Museum (徳島市立考古資料館, Tokushima-shi kōko shiryōkan) opened in Tokushima, Japan, in 1998. The collection includes artefacts from the Jōmon to the Nara and Heian periods.

== See also ==
- Tokushima Prefectural Museum
- Tokushima Prefectural Buried Cultural Properties Research Centre
- List of Cultural Properties of Japan - archaeological materials (Tokushima)
