= List of cultural properties of Japan – historical materials (Tokushima) =

This list is of the cultural properties of Japan designated in the category of historical materials (歴史資料, rekishi shiryō) for the Prefecture of Tokushima.

== National Cultural Properties ==
As of 1 February 2015, one Important Cultural Property has been designated, being of national significance.

Property	Date	Municipality	Ownership	Comments	Image	Coordinates	Ref.
Model of Tokushima Han Whaler Senzanmaru 徳島藩御召鯨船千山丸; Tokushima-han omeshi kujirabune Senzanmaru	1857	Tokushima	Tokushima City (kept at Tokushima Castle Museum)			34°04′25″N 134°33′20″E	

== Prefectural Cultural Properties ==
As of 19 December 2014, five properties have been designated at a prefectural level.

Property	Date	Municipality	Ownership	Comments	Image	Coordinates	Ref.
Cloud-Topped Memorial Tablets 雲首形位牌; Uzugata ihai	c.1420	Naka	private			33°51′21″N 134°30′12″E	
Picture of the Crossing at Shinmachi-Bashi 新町橋渡初之図; Shinmachi-bashi watarizome no zu		Tokushima	private			34°04′15″N 134°33′03″E	
Esoteric School Sarvastivada Scripture Woodblocks 密宗所学説一切有部受体随行要軌板木; Misshū shogaku setsu issai ubu uketai zuikō yōki hangi		Ishii	Renkō-ji (蓮光寺)			34°04′19″N 134°25′55″E	
Cloud-Topped Memorial Tablets 雲首形位牌; Uzugata ihai		Naka	private			33°51′36″N 134°31′48″E	
Materials relating to Bandō Prisoner-of-War Camp 板東俘虜収容所関係資料; Bandō furyoshūyōjo kankei shiryō		Naruto	Naruto City (kept at German House)			34°09′53″N 134°29′57″E	

== Municipal Cultural Properties ==
Properties designated at the municipal level include the following:

Property	Date	Municipality	Ownership	Comments	Image	Coordinates	Ref.
Glass Plates of the Wanwan Kite (Naruto Giant Kite) わんわん凧(鳴門大凧)ガラス乾板 wanwan tako (Naruto ōtako) garasu kanpan		Naruto		40 plates; 16.3 centimetres (6.4 in) by 12 centimetres (4.7 in)		34°11′05″N 134°36′49″E	

== See also ==
- Cultural Properties of Japan
- List of National Treasures of Japan (historical materials)
- List of Historic Sites of Japan (Tokushima)
- List of Cultural Properties of Japan - paintings (Tokushima)
