= Anraku-ji =

Anraku-ji may refer to:

Buddhist temples in Japan:

- Anraku-ji (Kamiita) in Tokushima Prefecture
- Anraku-ji (Ueda) in Nagano Prefecture
- Anraku-ji (Hiroshima) in Hiroshima Prefecture
