= Tokushima Prefectural Buried Cultural Properties Research Centre =

- 徳島県立埋蔵文化財総合センター
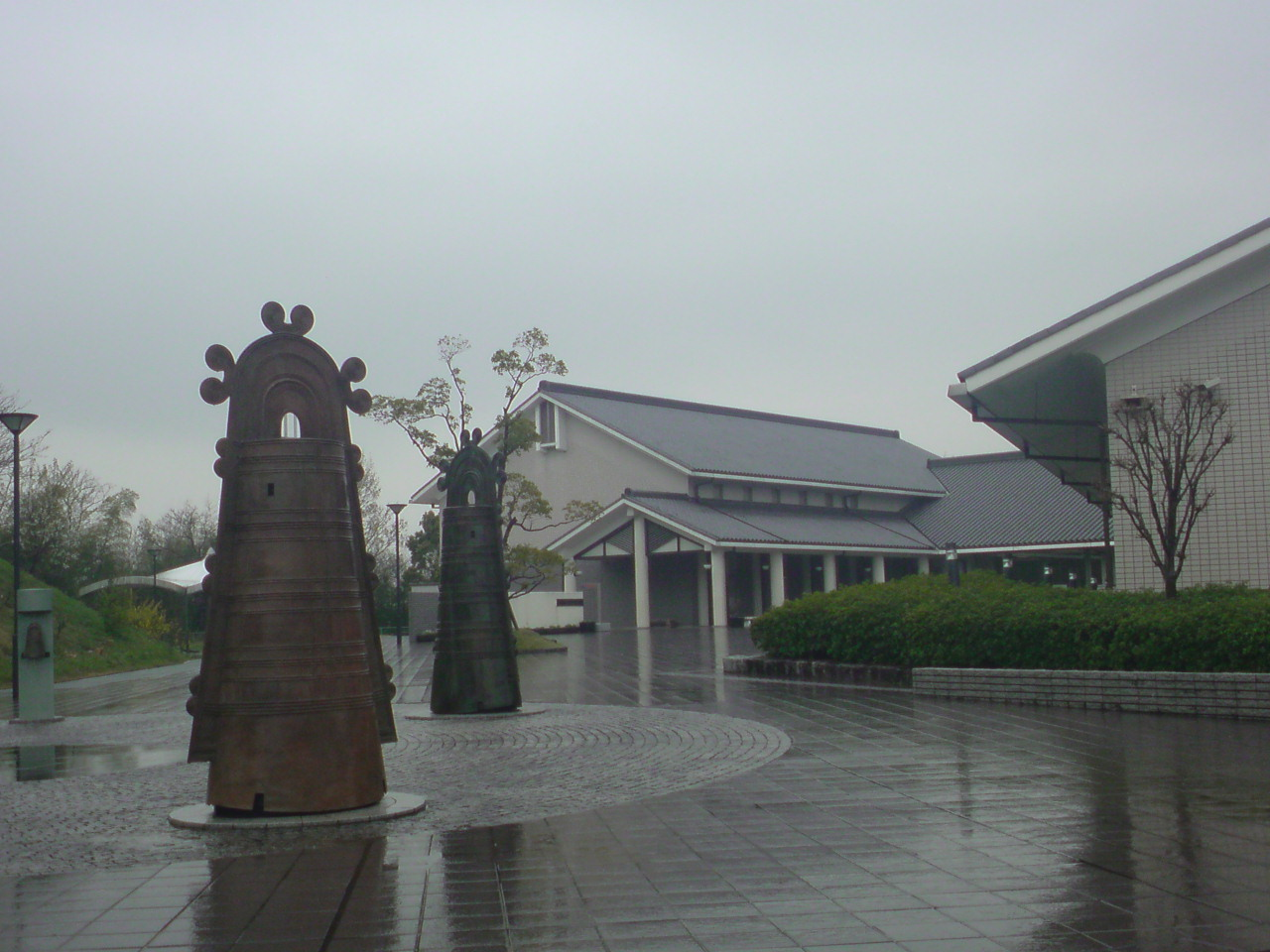
- Interactive map of the Tokushima Prefectural Buried Cultural Properties Research Centre area

General information
- Location: 86-2, Hirayama, Inubushi, Itano, Tokushima Prefecture, Japan
- Coordinates: 34°08′34″N 134°27′05″E
- Opened: 3 November 1995

Tokushima Prefectural Buried Cultural Properties Research Centre (徳島県立埋蔵文化財総合センター, Tokushima kenritsu maizō bunkazai sōgō sentā) opened in Itano, Tokushima Prefecture, Japan, in 1995. The collection includes a dōtaku excavated in Yano, Tokushima City which has been designated an Important Cultural Property. Publications include an Annual Bulletin (since 1989) and Research Reports (No.84 in 2014).

== See also ==
- Tokushima Prefectural Museum
- List of Cultural Properties of Japan - archaeological materials (Tokushima)
