= Dōgaku-ji =

Coordinates: 34°03′31″N 134°25′40″E

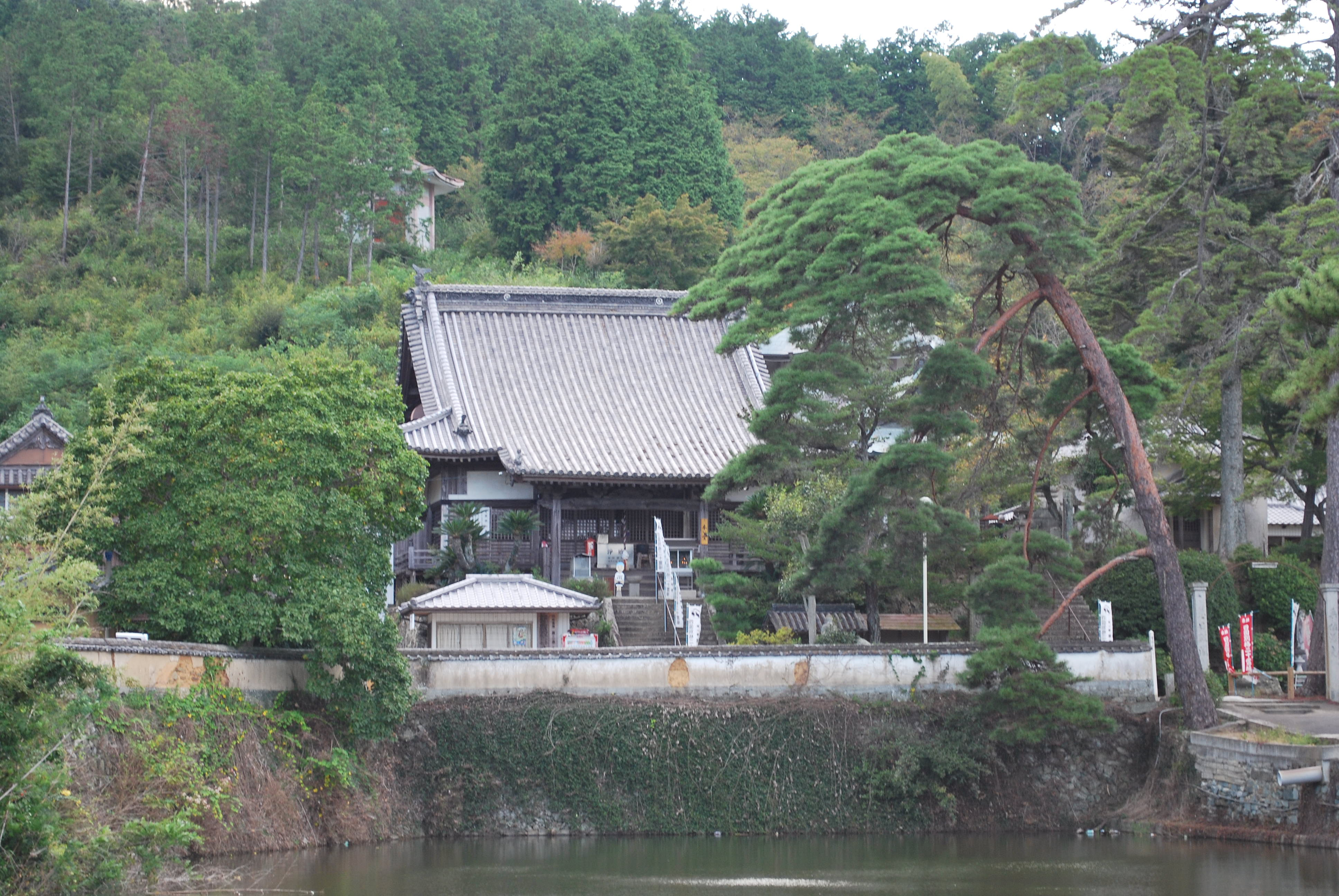
Dōgaku-ji Hondō

Dōgaku-ji (童学寺) is a Zentsū-ji Shingon temple in Ishii, Tokushima Prefecture, Japan. The Heian period seated wooden statue of Yakushi Nyorai has been designated an Important Cultural Property. The temple is the second of the 20 Fudasho Bangai.

== See also ==
- Important Cultural Properties of Japan
