= Awa Kokubunni-ji ruins =

Historic religious ruin in Ishii, Tokushima, Japan

Awa Kokubun-niji ruins
- 阿波国分尼寺跡 (Japanese)
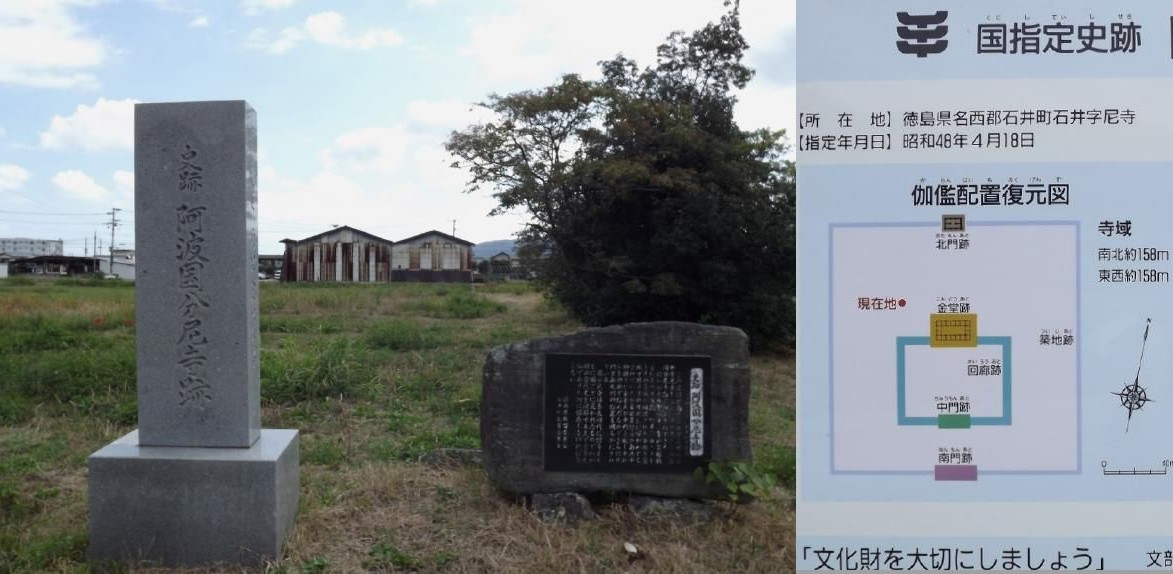
- Awa Kokubun-niji ruins

- Location within Tokushima Prefecture Location within Japan
- 34°4′4.2″N 134°27′55.8″E
- Type: Buddhist temple ruins
- Location: Ishii, Tokushima, Japan

History
- Founder: c.Emperor Shōmu
- Built: Nara period
- National Historic Site of Japan

The Awa Kokubun-niji ruins (阿波国分尼寺跡) is an archaeological site with the ruins of a Nara period Buddhist temple in the Ishii-Ninji neighborhood of the town of Ishiii, Tokushima Prefecture Japan. Its ruins were designated as a National Historic Site in 1973.

== History ==
The Shoku Nihongi records that in 741, as the country recovered from a major smallpox epidemic, Emperor Shōmu ordered that a monastery and nunnery be established in every province, the kokubunji (国分寺). These temples were built to a semi-standardized template, and served both to spread Buddhist orthodoxy to the provinces, and to emphasize the power of the Nara period centralized government under the Ritsuryō system. While the sites of most of the kokubun-ji monasteries are either known or have been discovered, very few sites of the kokubun-niji nunneries are known.

The Awa Kokubun-niji site is located on the alluvial plain formed by the confluence of the Yoshino River and the Akui Rivers. The local place name of Ninji (尼寺), meaning "nunnery" and local tradition from ancient times retained the memory that a temple once existed in this area, but it was not until construction work on a housing development began in 1970 that a megalith identified as the cornerstone of an ancient building was discovered. Subsequent archaeological excavations found the foundation stones for the Kondō and North Gate, the remains of the cloister and portions of a moat. From traces of a surrounding earthen palisade, the temple compound was found to occupy an area of 158 meters square. Considering the size of the temple ruins, and its proximity to the Awa Kokubun-ji, approximately 1.5 kilometers away, it was determined that this was the ruins of the Awa Kokubun-niji.

The site was backfilled after excavation. Currently, a guide board explaining the ruins is installed. The temple site is a five-minute walk from the "Tossakakita" bus stop on the Tokushima Bus from Tokushima Station.

== See also ==
- List of Historic Sites of Japan (Tokushima)
- Provincial temple
