= Ryōzen-ji (Naruto) =

Buddhist temple in Japan

- 霊山寺
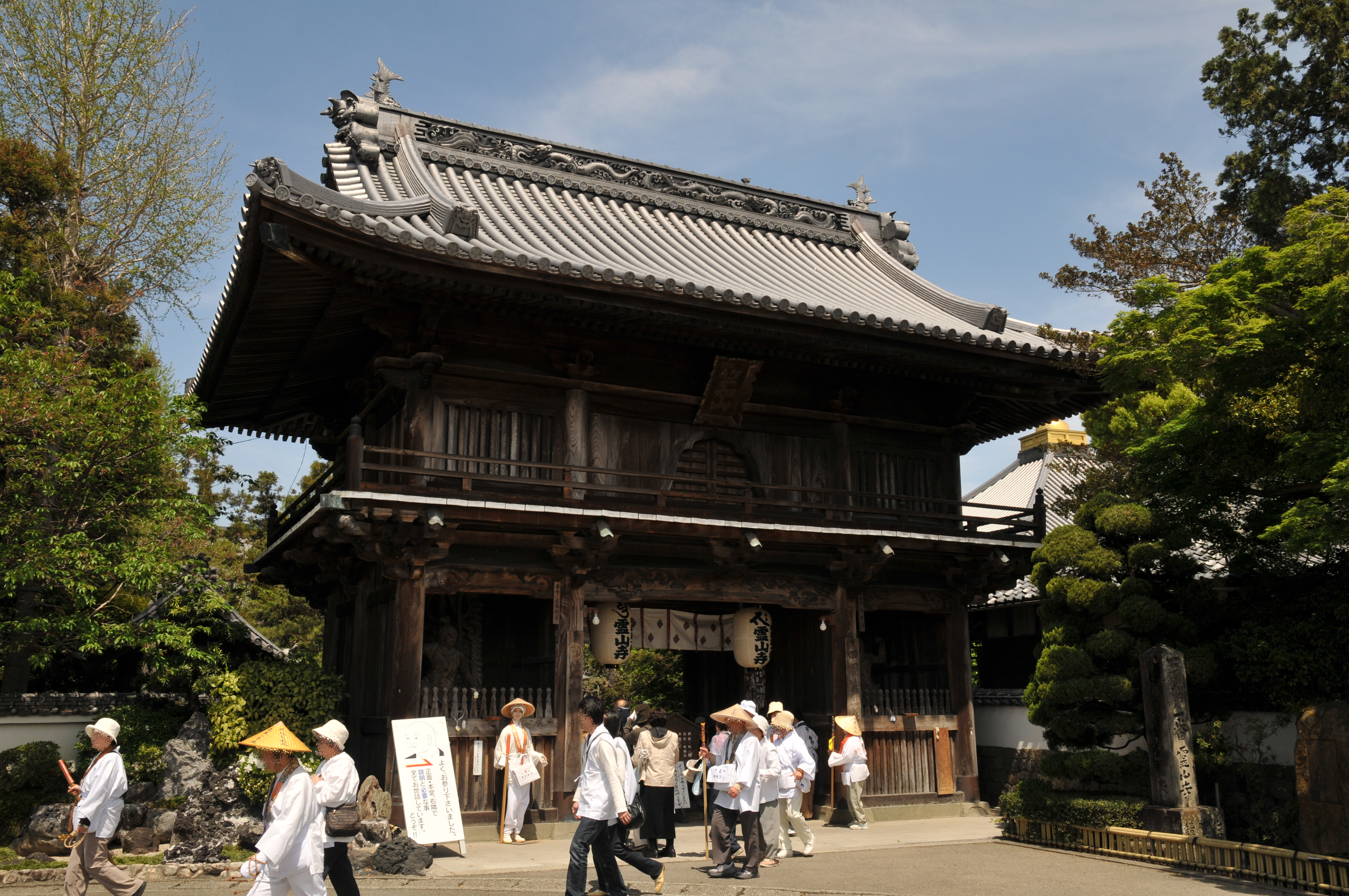
- Pilgrims (henro) at Ryōzen-ji

- Location within Tokushima Prefecture

Religion
- Affiliation: Buddhism
- Sect: Kōyasan Shingon
- Deity: Shaka Nyorai
- Rite: Mantra: Nōmaku sanmanda bodanan baku

Location
- Location: Naruto, Tokushima Prefecture
- Country: Japan
- Coordinates: 34°9′35.29″N 134°30′9.33″E

Architecture
- Founder: Gyōki
- Completed: 729-749

Ryōzen-ji (Japanese: 霊山寺; lit. 'Vulture Peak Temple') is a Shingon Buddhist temple in Naruto, Tokushima Prefecture, Japan best known as the first temple of the Shikoku pilgrimage. It is associated with the Kōyasan sect and dedicated to Shaka Nyorai.

Said to have been founded by Gyōki during the Tenpyō era, its buildings are more recent replacements after damage by fires. Located close to the crossing point for pilgrims from the Kansai region, Yūben Shinnen identified the temple as No.1 in his Shikoku henro michishirube of 1687 and subsequent guidebooks followed suit. It is customary to return to Ryōzen-ji on a 'thanksgiving visit' (orei mairi) upon completing the pilgrimage, although this may be a relatively recent development.

== See also ==
- Tōrin-in, the temple's oku-no-in
