= Kumadani-ji (Awa) =

Shingon temple in Awa, Tokushima Prefecture, Japan

Coordinates: 34°07′22″N 134°20′24″E

Kumadani-ji 熊谷寺
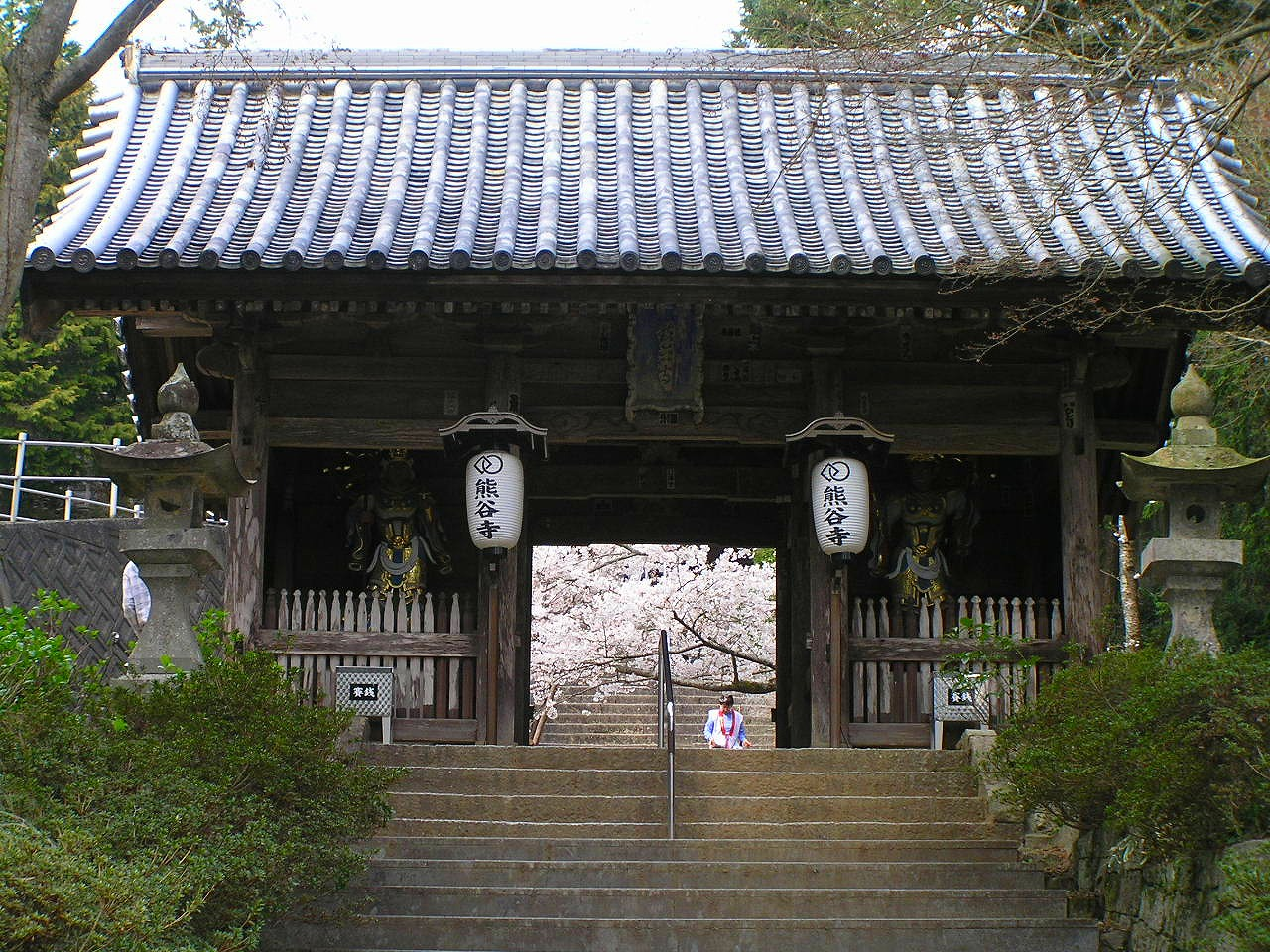
- Niōmon

Religion
- Affiliation: Shingon
- Deity: Senjū Kannon

Location
- Location: Awa-shi, Tokushima-ken
- Country: Japan
- Interactive map of Kumadani-ji 熊谷寺

Architecture
- Founder: Kūkai
- Completed: early 9th century

Kumadani-ji (熊谷寺) is a Kōya-san Shingon temple in Awa, Tokushima Prefecture, Japan. Temple 8 on the Shikoku 88 temple pilgrimage, the main image is of Senjū Kannon. The temple is said to have been founded by Kōbō Daishi. The Hondō was destroyed by fire in 1928 and has been rebuilt. The Daishidō, tahōtō, chūmon, and shōrō have all been designated Prefectural Cultural Properties.

== See also ==
- Shikoku 88 temple pilgrimage
