= Anraku-ji (Kamiita) =

Buddhist temple in Kamiita, Tokushima, Japan

Coordinates: 34°7′5″N 134°23′18.2″E

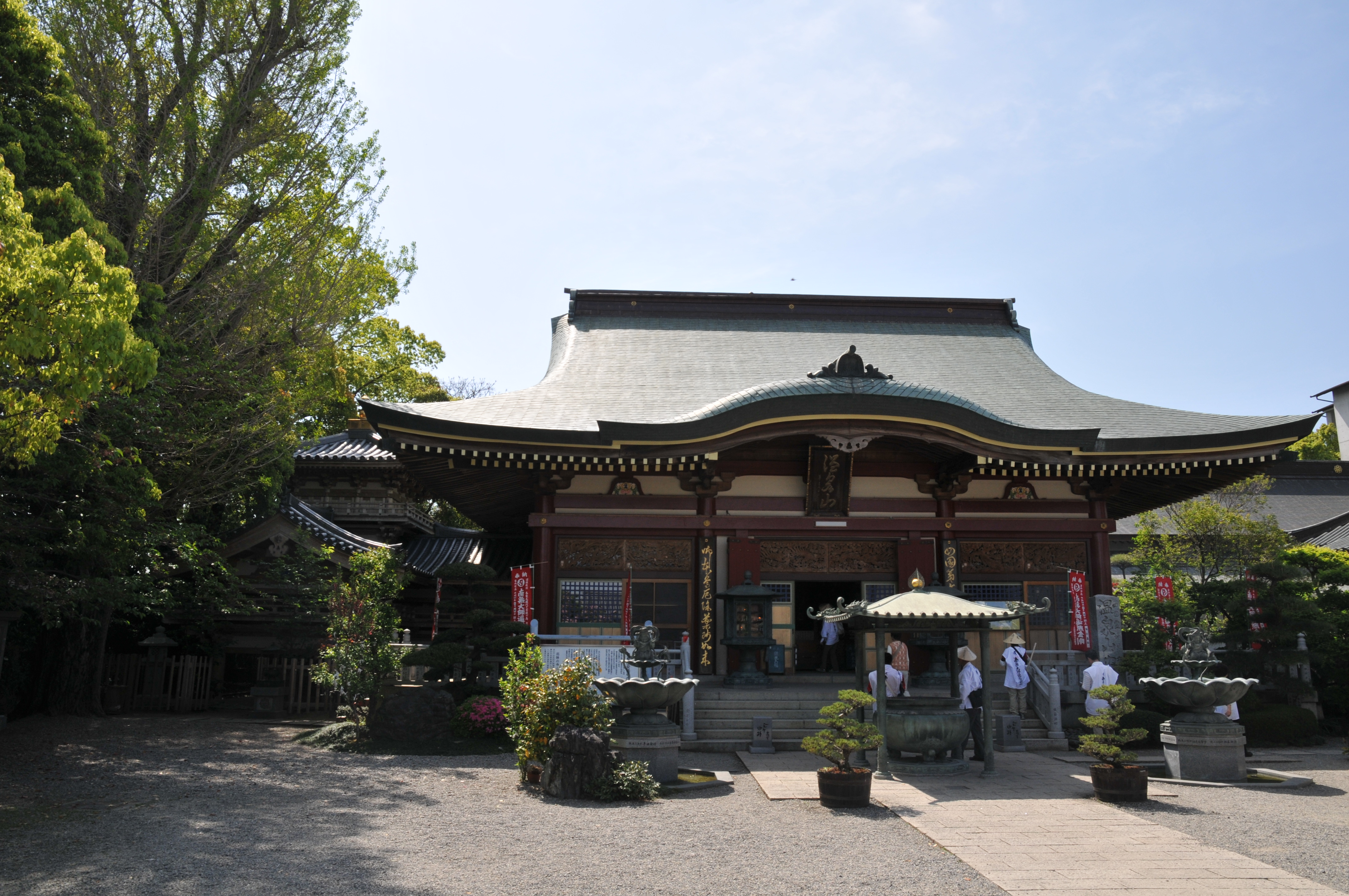
Anraku-ji Hondō

Anraku-ji (安楽寺) is a Buddhist temple of the Kōyasan Shingon-shū in Kamiita, Tokushima, Japan. Temple 6 on the Shikoku Pilgrimage, the main image is of Bhaisajyaguru (Yakushi Nyōrai). The temple is said to have been founded by Kūkai, who carved the image. The Hōjō (1751–1829) has been placed on the cultural properties register. Anraku-ji has played an influential role in the Shikoku Reijōkai (Shikoku Pilgrimage Association), providing its first head in 1956.
