= Tokushima Castle Museum =

- 徳島市立徳島城博物館
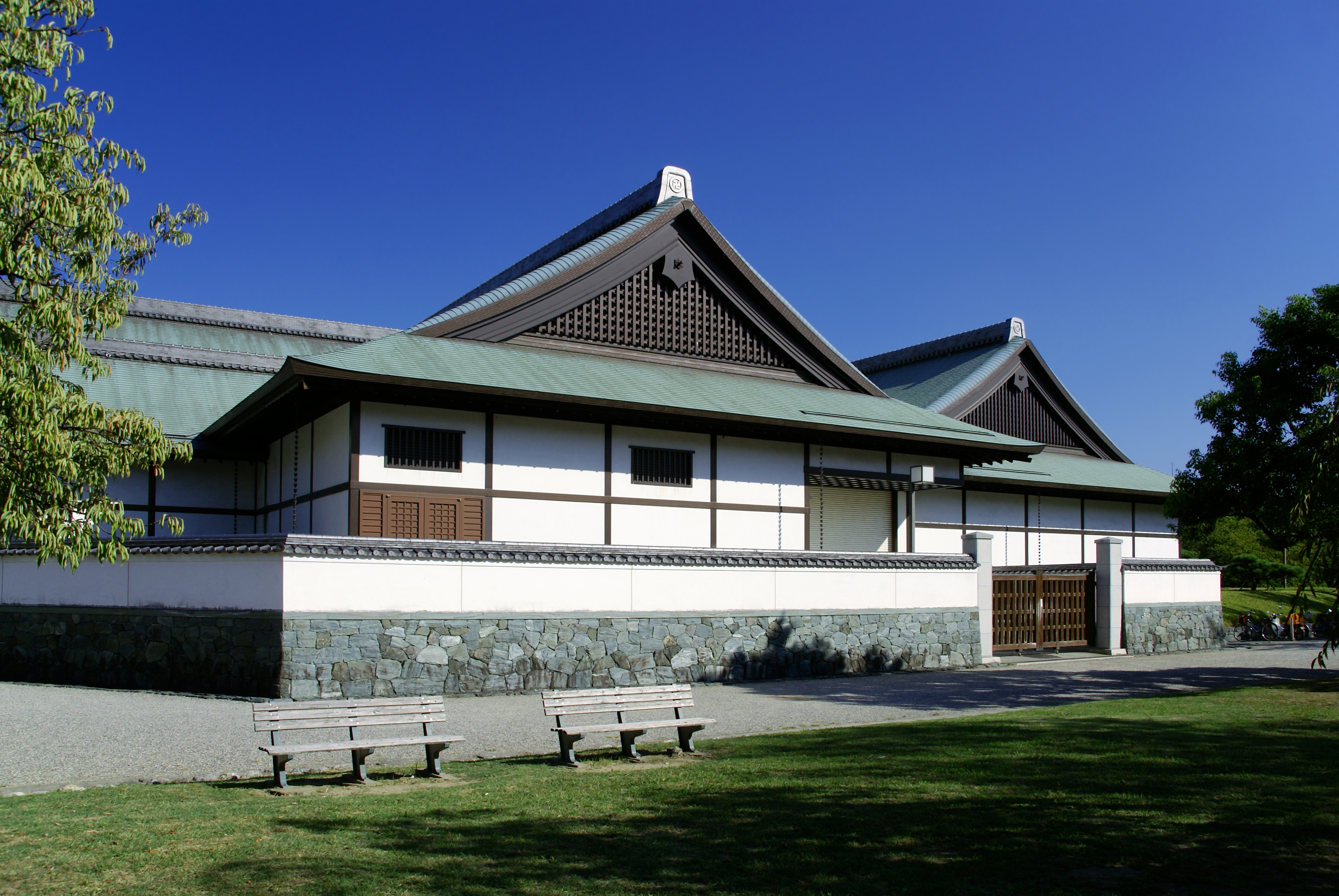
- Interactive map of the Tokushima Castle Museum area

General information
- Location: 1-8, Tokushimachō Jōnai, Tokushima, Tokushima Prefecture, Japan
- Coordinates: 34°04′25″N 134°33′21″E
- Opened: October 1992

Website
- ja

Tokushima Castle Museum (徳島市立徳島城博物館, Tokushima shiritsu Tokushima-jō hakubutsukan) opened in Tokushima, Japan, in 1992. The museum is located in a garden with the ruins of Tokushima Castle, and features exhibits about the history of the castle.

== See also ==
- Tokushima Prefectural Museum
