= Tōrin-in (Naruto) =

Buddhist temple in Tokushima Prefecture, Japan

Coordinates: 34°09′41″N 134°32′10″E

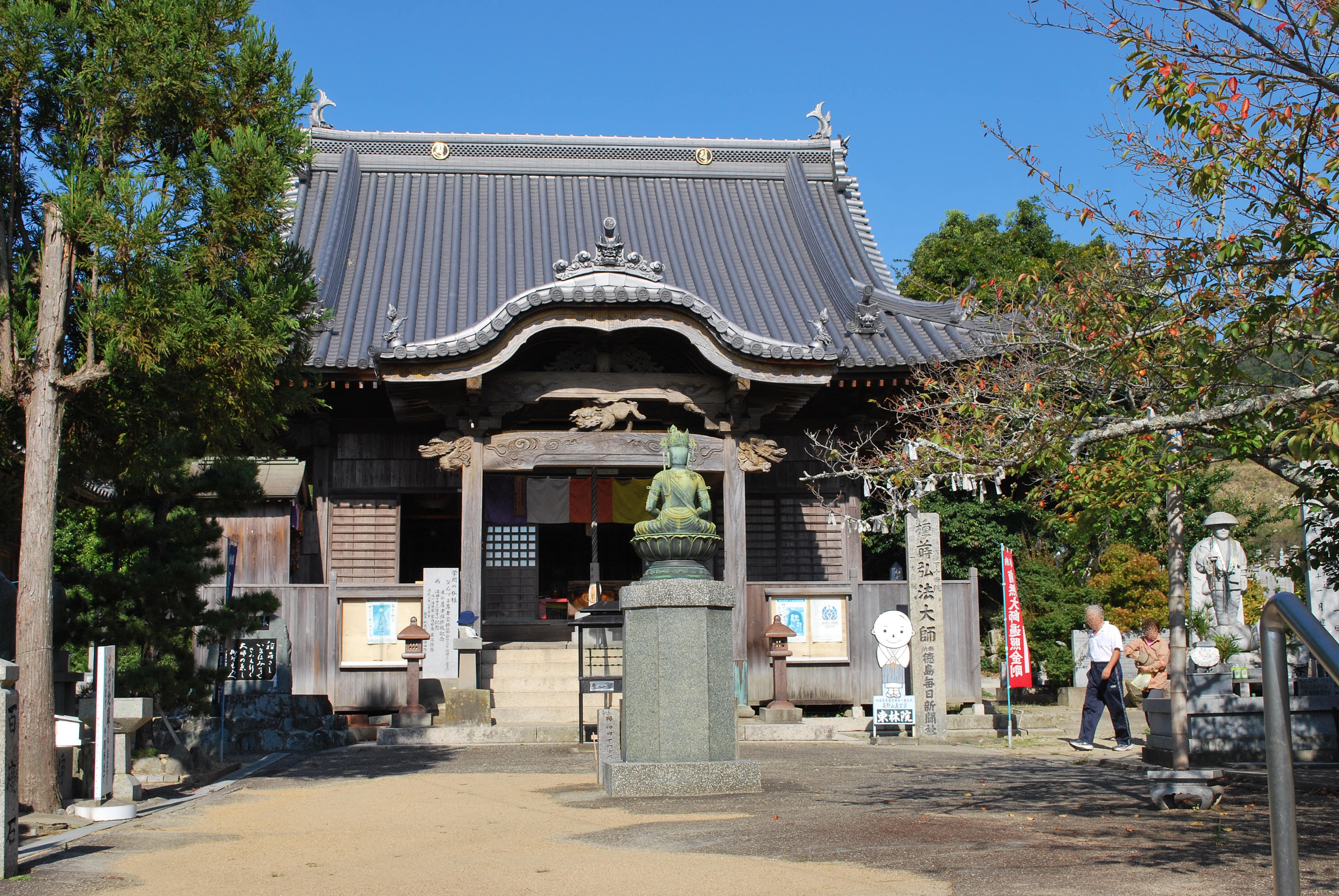
Tōrin-in Daishi-dō

Tōrin-in (東林院), also known as Takamine-Daishi (種蒔大師), is a temple in Naruto, Tokushima Prefecture, Japan. It is the oku-no-in of Ryōzen-ji, Temple 1 on the Shikoku 88 temple pilgrimage. Said to have been founded by Gyōki, the main image is of Yakushi Nyorai. It is Temple 1 on the Shinshikoku Mandala Reijō. A Heian period seated wooden statue of Miroku Bosatsu has been designated an Important Cultural Property.

== See also ==
- Ryōzen-ji
