= Taisan-ji (Kamiita) =

Coordinates: 34.1595°N 134.4000°E

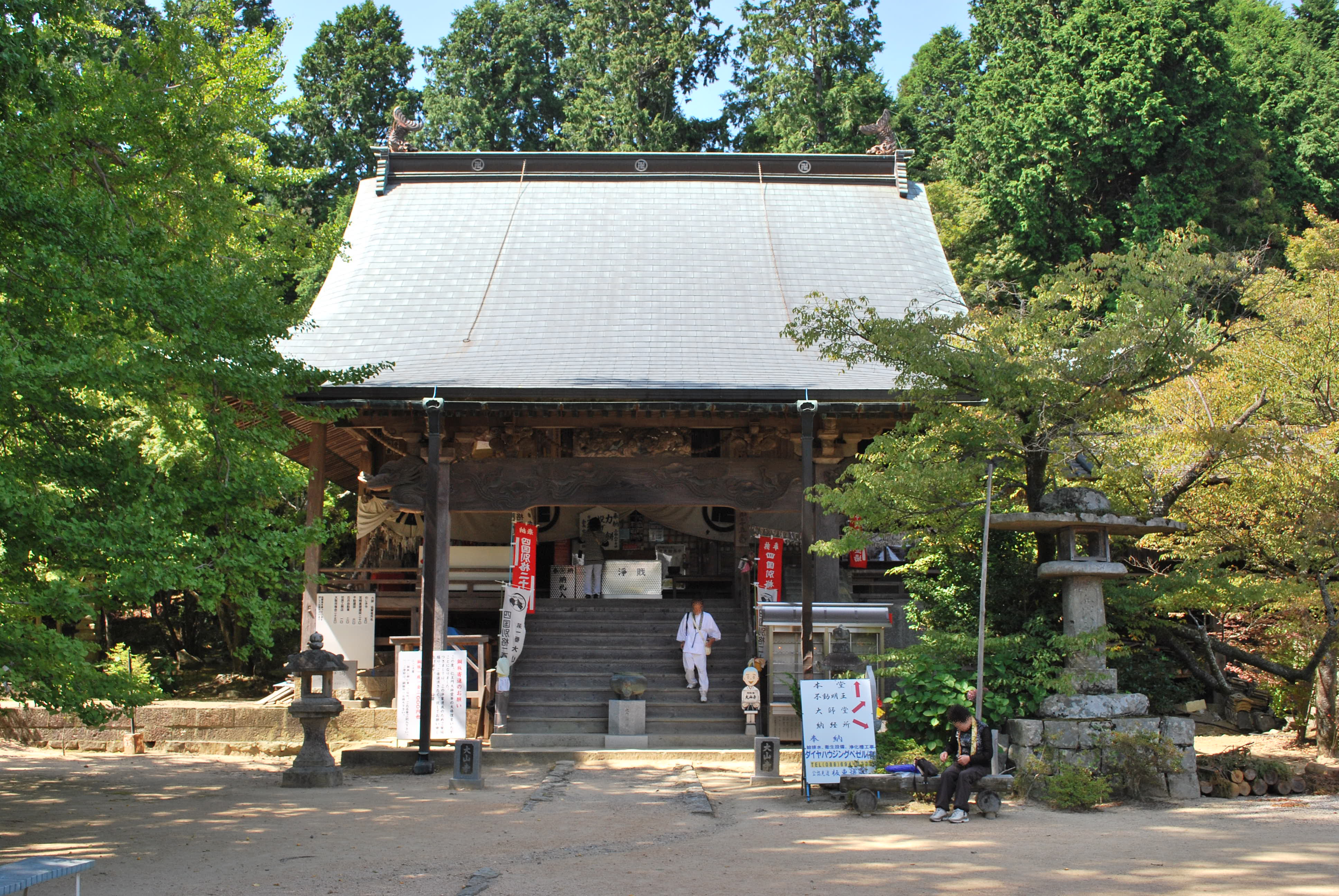
Taisan-ji Hondō (mid-Edo period)

Taisan-ji (大山寺) is a Daigo Shingon temple in Kamiita, Tokushima Prefecture, Japan. Said to have been visited by Kōbō Daishi, the main image is of Senjū Kannon. The Shōrō-mon and Kairō of 1830–68, Hondō (mid-Edo period), and Daishidō (1863) have all been placed on the cultural properties register. The temple was renovated in 1985. A bronze canister containing documents dating to 1126 has been designated an Important Cultural Property. The temple is the first of the 20 Fudasho Bangai and also Temple 1 of the Shikoku 36 Fudō pilgrimage.

== See also ==
- Junrei
- Important Cultural Properties of Japan
