= Kamiita, Tokushima =

Kamiita 上板町
- Town
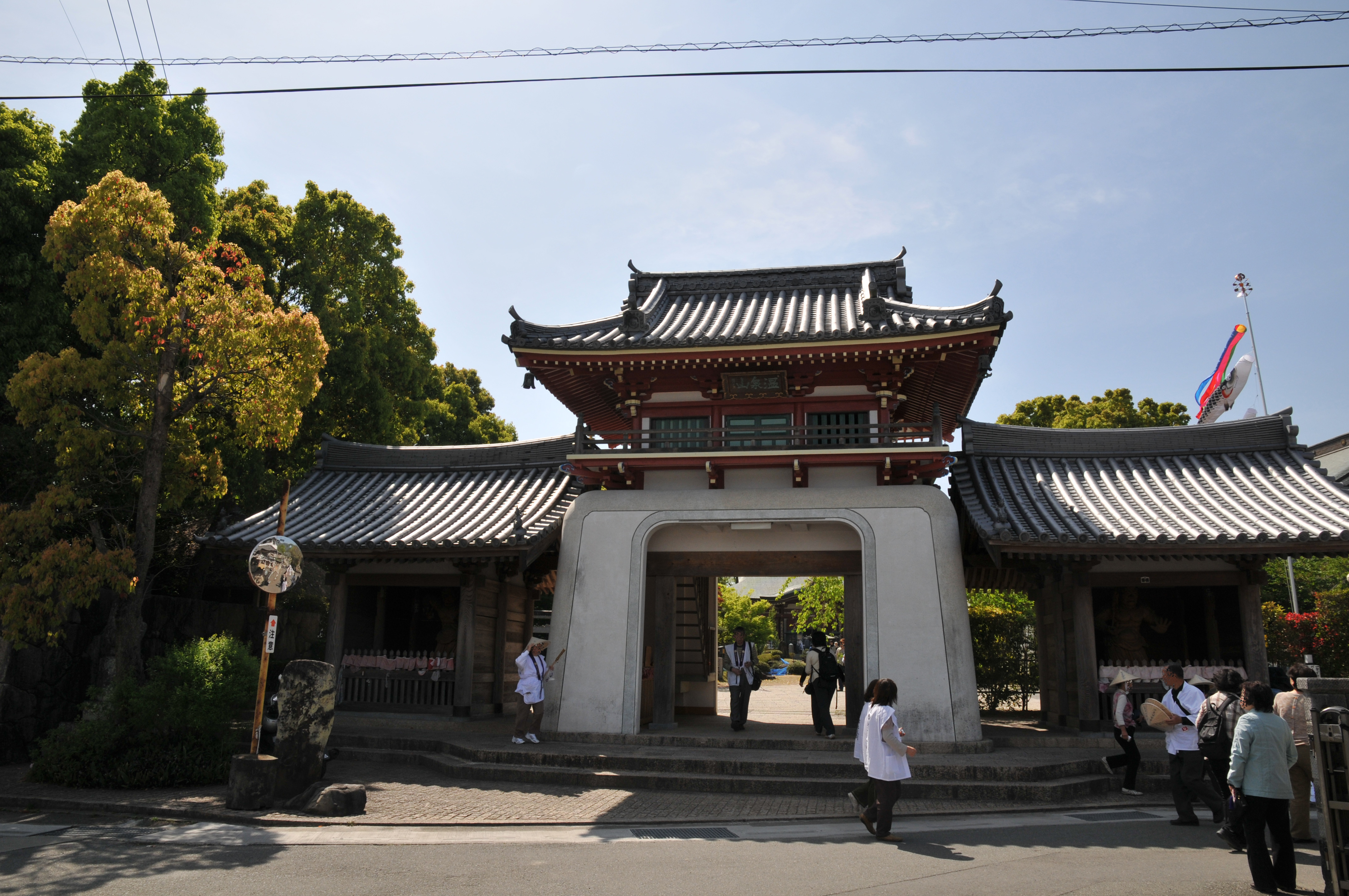
- Anraku-ji

- Flag Emblem
- Interactive map of Kamiita
- Location in Japan
- Coordinates: 34°7′N 134°24′E
- Country: Japan
- Region: Shikoku
- Prefecture: Tokushima
- District: Itano

Area
  - Total: 34.58 km^{2} (13.35 sq mi)

Population (April 1, 2022)
  - Total: 11,725
  - Density: 339.1/km^{2} (878.2/sq mi)
- Time zone: UTC+09:00 (JST)
- City hall address: 42 Kyozuka, Shichijo, Kamiita-cho, Itano-gun, Tokushima-ken 771-1392
- Website: Official website
- Symbols
- Flower: Japanese indigo
- Tree: Ginkgo biloba

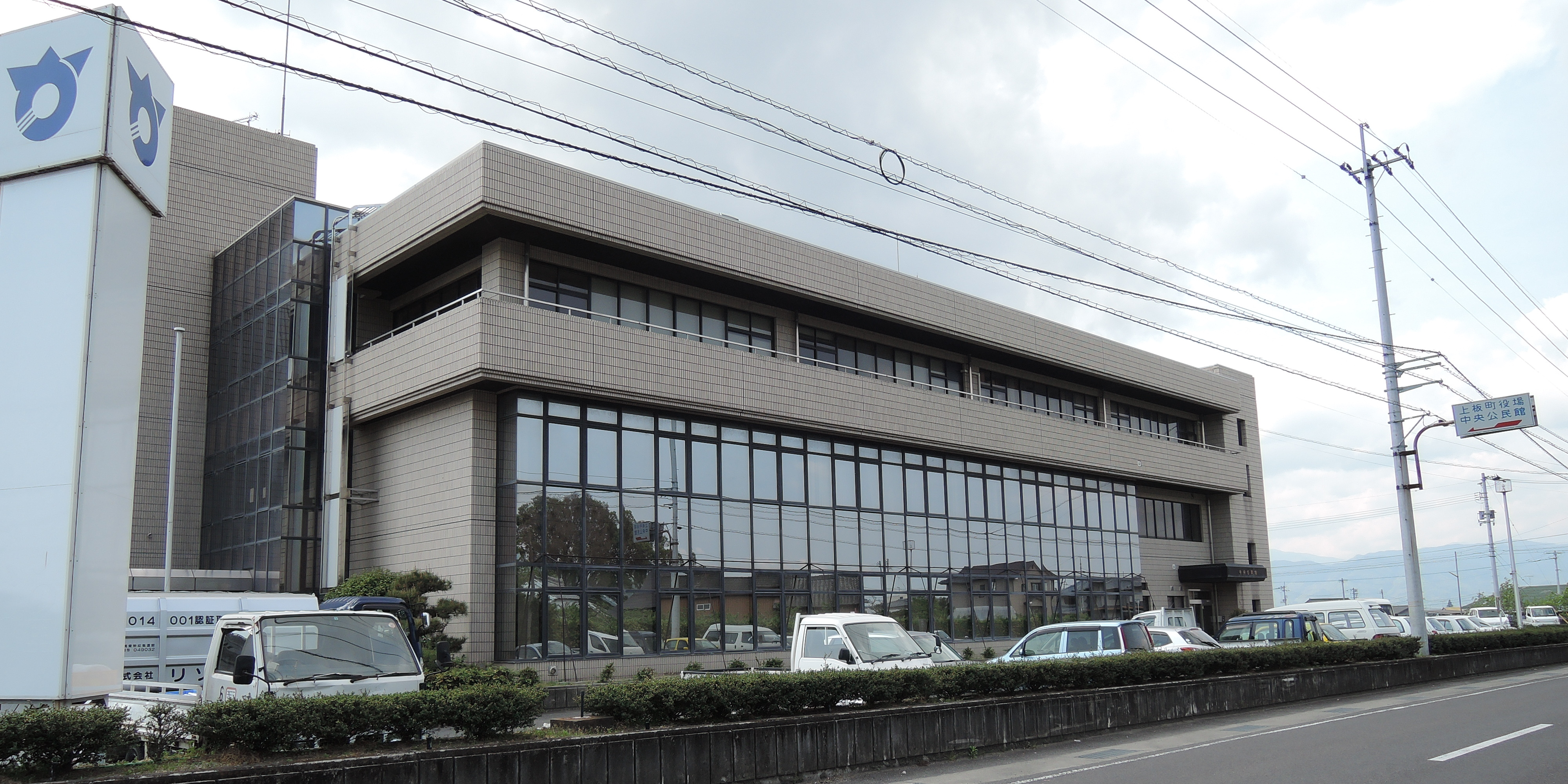
Kamiita Town Hall

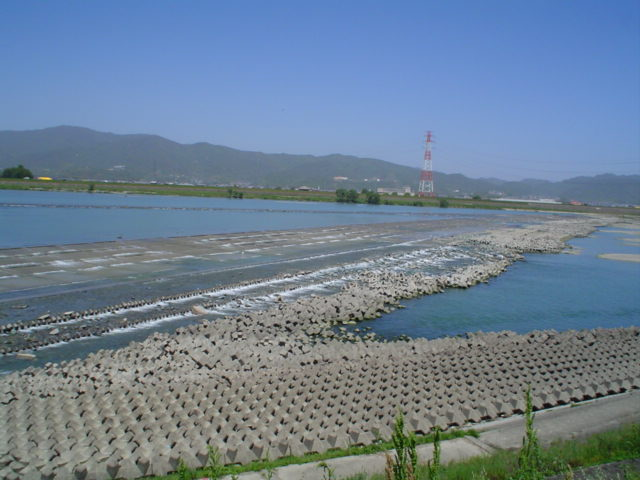
Yoshinogawa at Kamiita

Kamiita (上板町, Kamiita-chō) is a town located in Itano District, Tokushima Prefecture, Japan. As of 30 June 2022, the town had an estimated population of 11,725 in 4951 households and a population density of 340 persons per km^{2}. The total area of the town is 34.58 square kilometres (13.35 sq mi).

== Geography ==
Kamiita is located in northeastern Tokushima Prefecture on the island of Shikoku. It is sandwiched between the Sanuki Mountains to the north and the Yoshino River to the south. The Japan Median Tectonic Line runs from east to west in the center of the town, separating the mountainous area to the north and the plains to the south. The highest elevation of the town is Oyama, which is 691 meters above sea level. Numerous small rivers which originate in the Sanuki Mountains form multiple alluvial fans and have been inhabited by people from ancient times.

=== Neighbouring municipalities ===
Kagawa Prefecture

- Higashikagawa

Tokushima Prefecture

- Aizumi
- Awa
- Ishii
- Itano
- Yoshinogawa

== Climate ==
Kamiita has a humid subtropical climate (Köppen Cfa) characterized by warm summers and cool winters with light snowfall. The average annual temperature in Kamiita is 15.2 °C. The average annual rainfall is 1637 mm with September as the wettest month. The temperatures are highest on average in August, at around 26.4 °C, and lowest in January, at around 4.5 °C.

== Demographics ==
Per Japanese census data, the population of Kamiita has been relatively steady for the past 70 years.

Historical population
Year	Pop.	±%
1920	11,259	—
1930	11,666	+3.6%
1940	11,381	−2.4%
1950	15,405	+35.4%
1960	12,904	−16.2%
1970	11,234	−12.9%
1980	19,317	+72.0%
1990	12,071	−37.5%
2000	12,952	+7.3%
2010	12,735	−1.7%

== History ==
As with all of Tokushima Prefecture, the area of Kammita was part of ancient Awa Province. The area is one of the oldest inhabited areas of Shikoku, and stone tools from the Japanese Paleolithic period, Jomon pottery, dotaku from the Yayoi period, burial mounds from the Kofun period have been found. Itano District was one of the seven counties of Awa established by the Taika Reform. During the Edo period, the area was part of the holdings of Tokushima Domain ruled by the Hachisuka clan from their seat at Tokushima Castle, and Kamiita became an agricultural area noted for its production of indigo. The villages of Oyama (大山村) and Matsushima (松島町) within Itano District, Tokushima and the village of Takashi (高志村) within Myōzai District, Tokushima were established with the creation of the modern municipalities system on October 1, 1889. The three municipalities merged on March 31, 1955, to form the town of Kamiita.

== Government ==
Kamiita has a mayor-council form of government with a directly elected mayor and a unicameral town council of 13 members. Kamiita, together with the other municipalities of Itano District, contributes four members to the Tokushima Prefectural Assembly. In terms of national politics, the town is part of Tokushima 2nd district of the lower house of the Diet of Japan.

== Economy ==
Since the Edo period, the area has been known for production of indigo and sugar, which remain important heritage products to this day. The local economy is strongly agricultural, with rice and market crops as carrots, lettuce, spinach, and strawberries, and fruit trees such as persimmons and peaches predominating. It is also the largest dairy area in Tokushima Prefecture.

== Education ==
Kamiita has four public elementary schools and one public middle school operated by the town government. The town does not have a high school.

== Transportation ==
=== Railway ===
Kamiita has not had passenger rail service since the abolition of the JNR Kajiyabara Line in 1972. Currently, the nearest passenger station is Itano on the JR Shikoku Kōtoku Line

=== Highways ===
- Tokushima Expressway

== Local attractions ==
- Anraku-ji, 6th temple on the Shikoku Pilgrimage
- Taisan-ji
