= Shōrō =

Bell towers in Japan

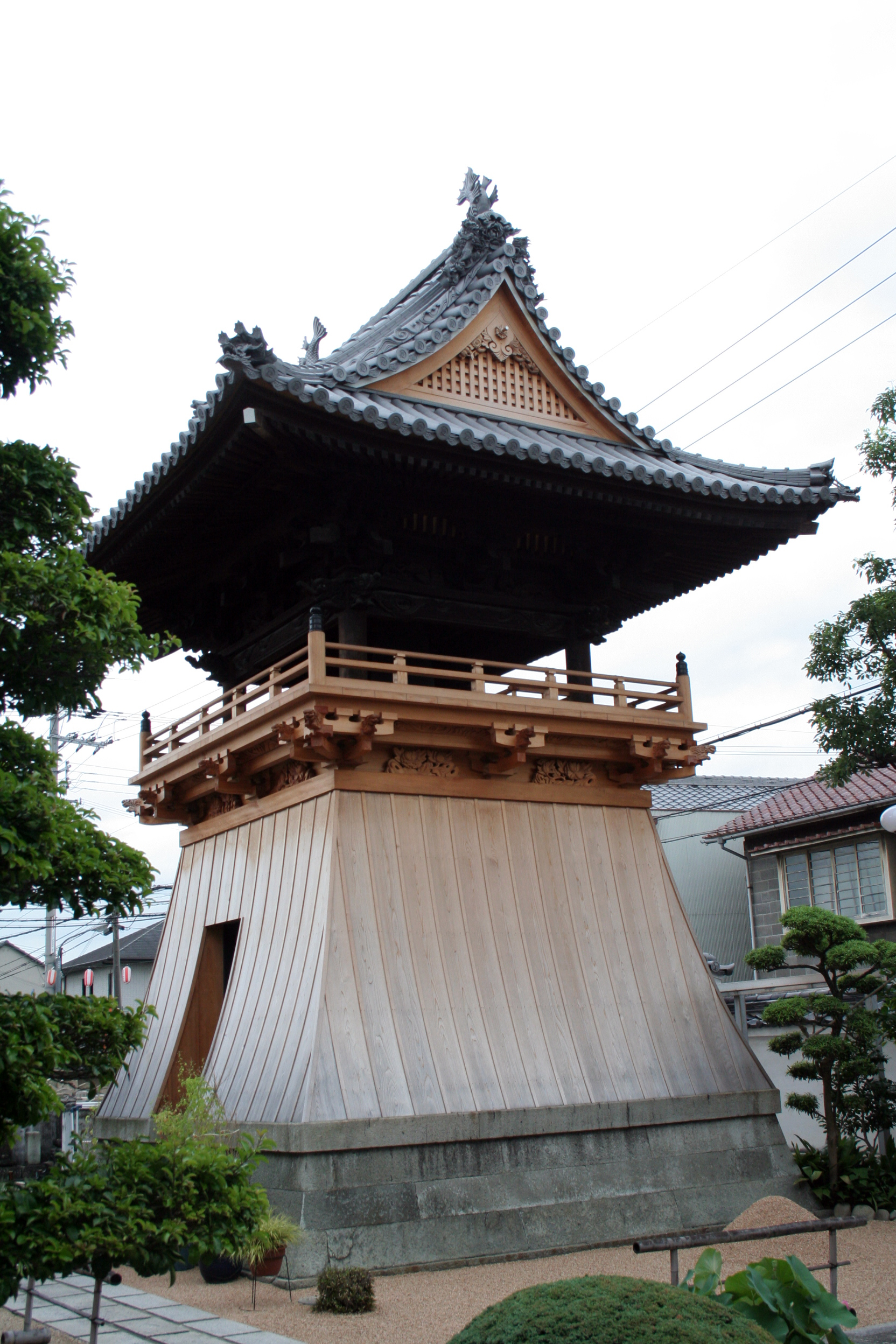

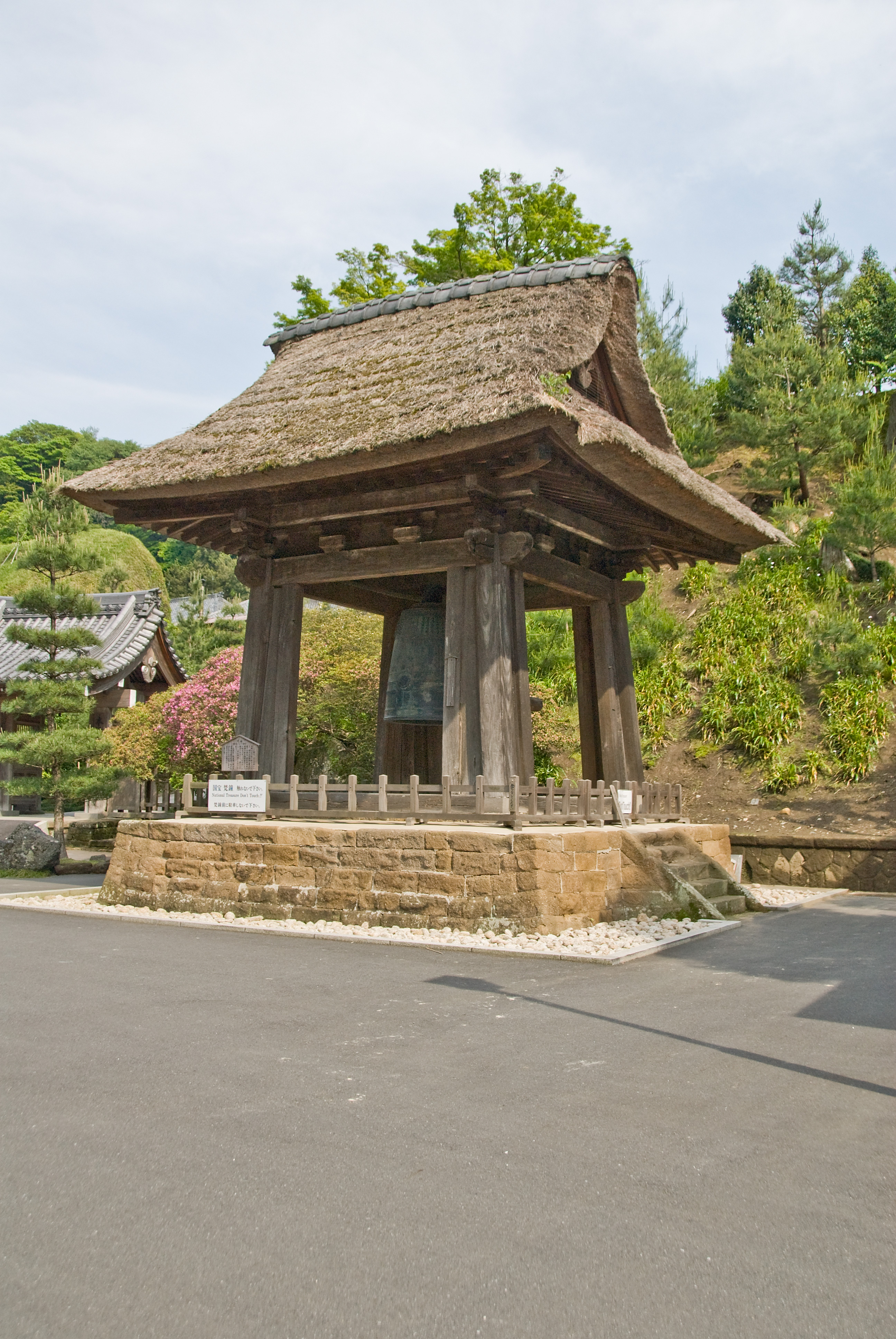

The two main types of bell tower in Japan

The shōrō, shurō (鐘楼; lit. 'bell building') or kanetsuki-dō (鐘突堂; lit. bell-striking hall) is the bell tower of a Buddhist temple in Japan, housing the temple's bonshō (梵鐘). It can also be found at some Shinto shrines which used to function as temples (see article Shinbutsu shūgō), as for example Nikkō Tōshō-gū. Two main types exist, the older hakamagoshi (袴腰), which has walls, and the more recent fukihanachi (吹放ち) or fukinuki (吹貫・吹抜き), which does not.

== History ==
During the Nara period (710–794), immediately after the arrival of Buddhism in Japan bell towers were 3 x 2 bay, 2 storied buildings. A typical temple garan had normally two, one to the left and one to the right of the kyōzō (or kyō-dō), the sūtra repository. An extant example of this style is Hōryū-ji's Sai-in Shōrō in Nara (see photo in the gallery).

During the following Heian period (794–1185) was developed a new style called hakamagoshi which consisted of a two storied, hourglass-shaped building with the bell hanging from the second story. The earliest extant example is Hōryū-ji's Tō-in Shōrō (see photo in the gallery).

Finally, during the 13th century the fukihanachi type was created at Tōdai-ji by making all structural parts visible. The bell tower in this case usually consists of a 1-ken wide, 1-ken high structure with no walls and having the bell at its center (see photo above). Sometimes the four pillars have an inward inclination called uchikorobi (内転び; lit. inward fall). After the Nara period, in which temple layout was rigidly prescribed after the Chinese fashion, the position of the bell tower stopped being prescribed and began to change temple by temple. Roofs are either gabled (切妻造, kirizuma-zukuri) or hip-and-gable (入母屋造, irimoya-zukuri).

== Gallery ==
Shōrō

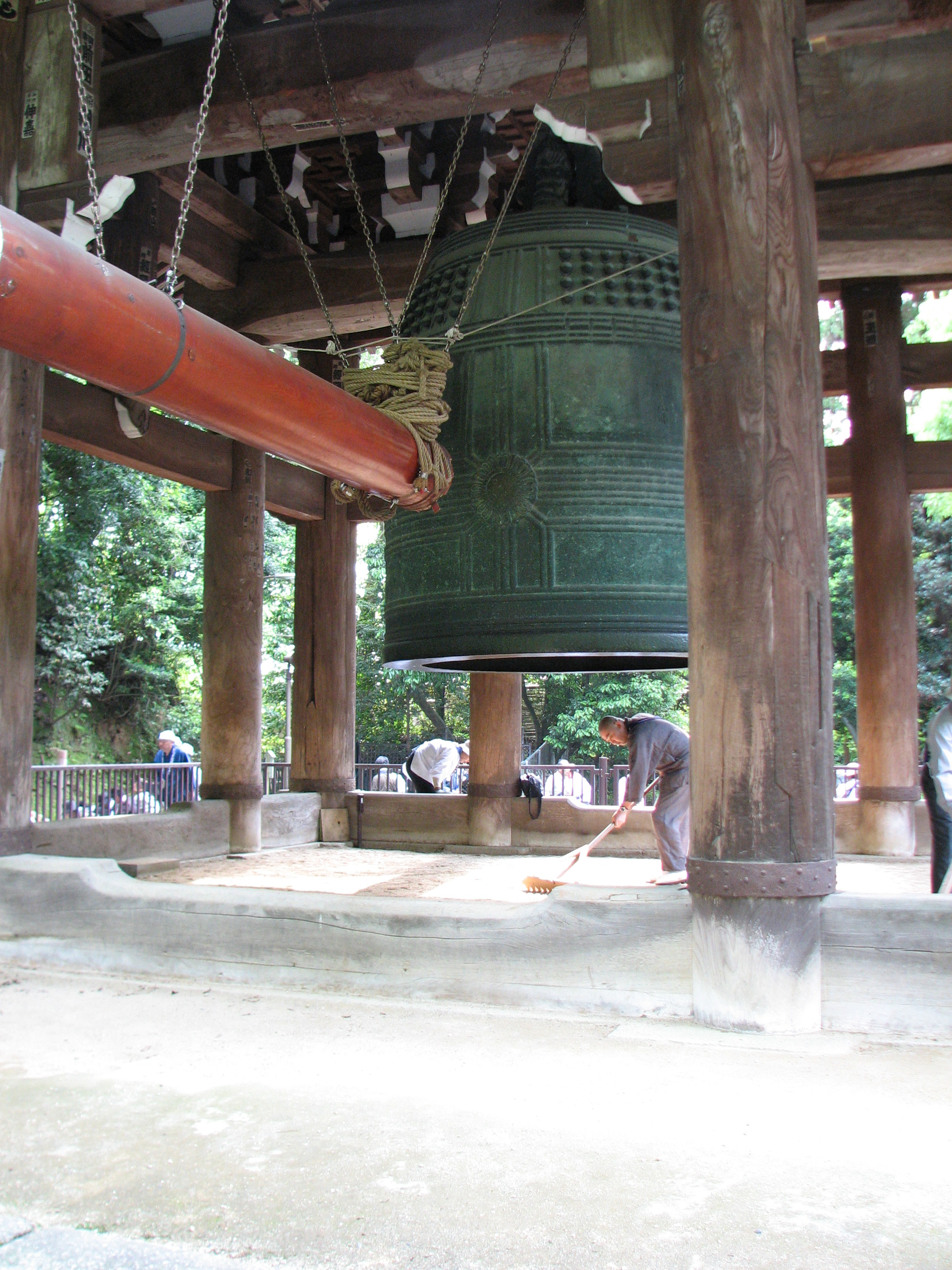
Great Bell at Chion-in

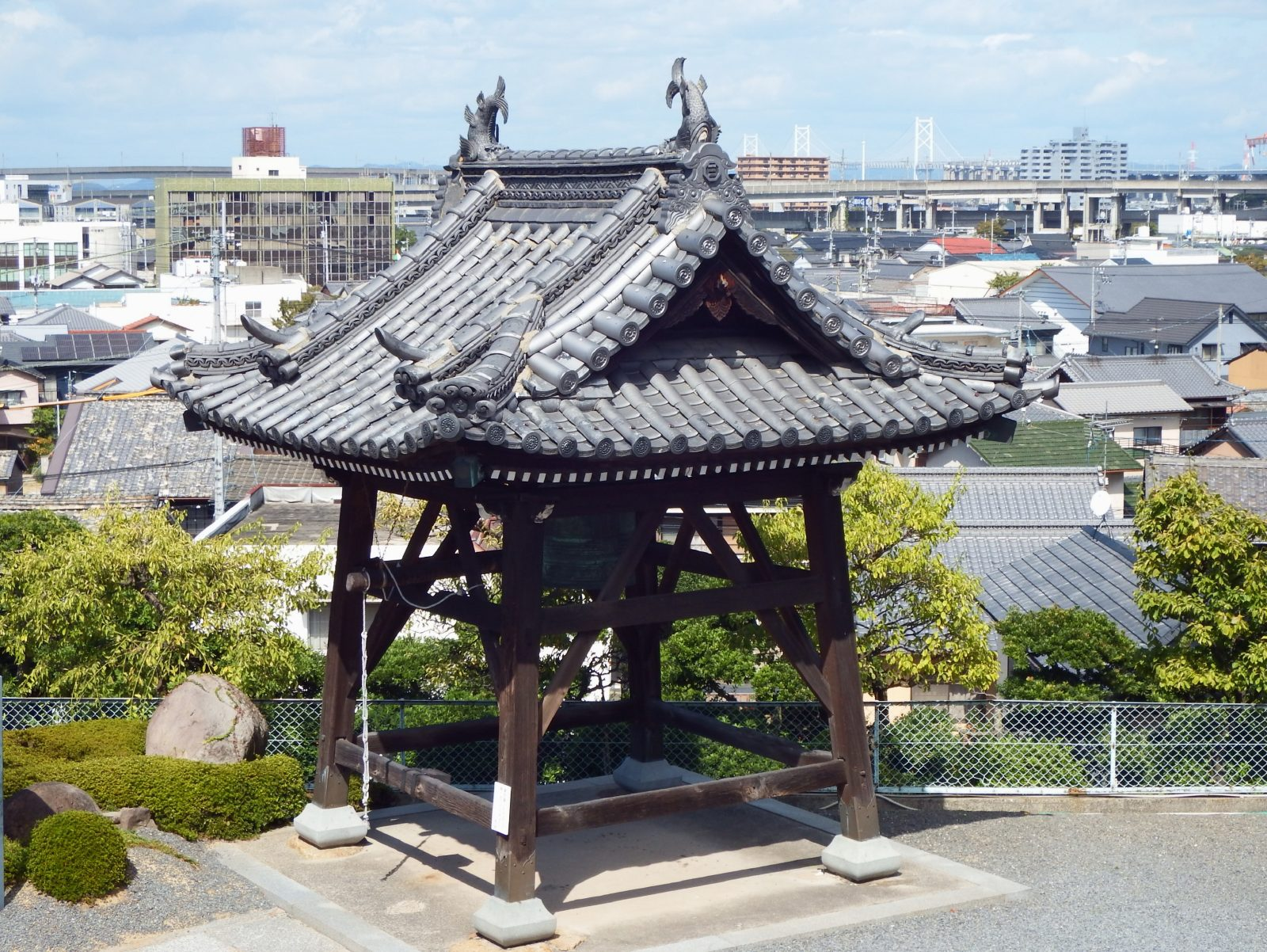
Goshoji-Temple

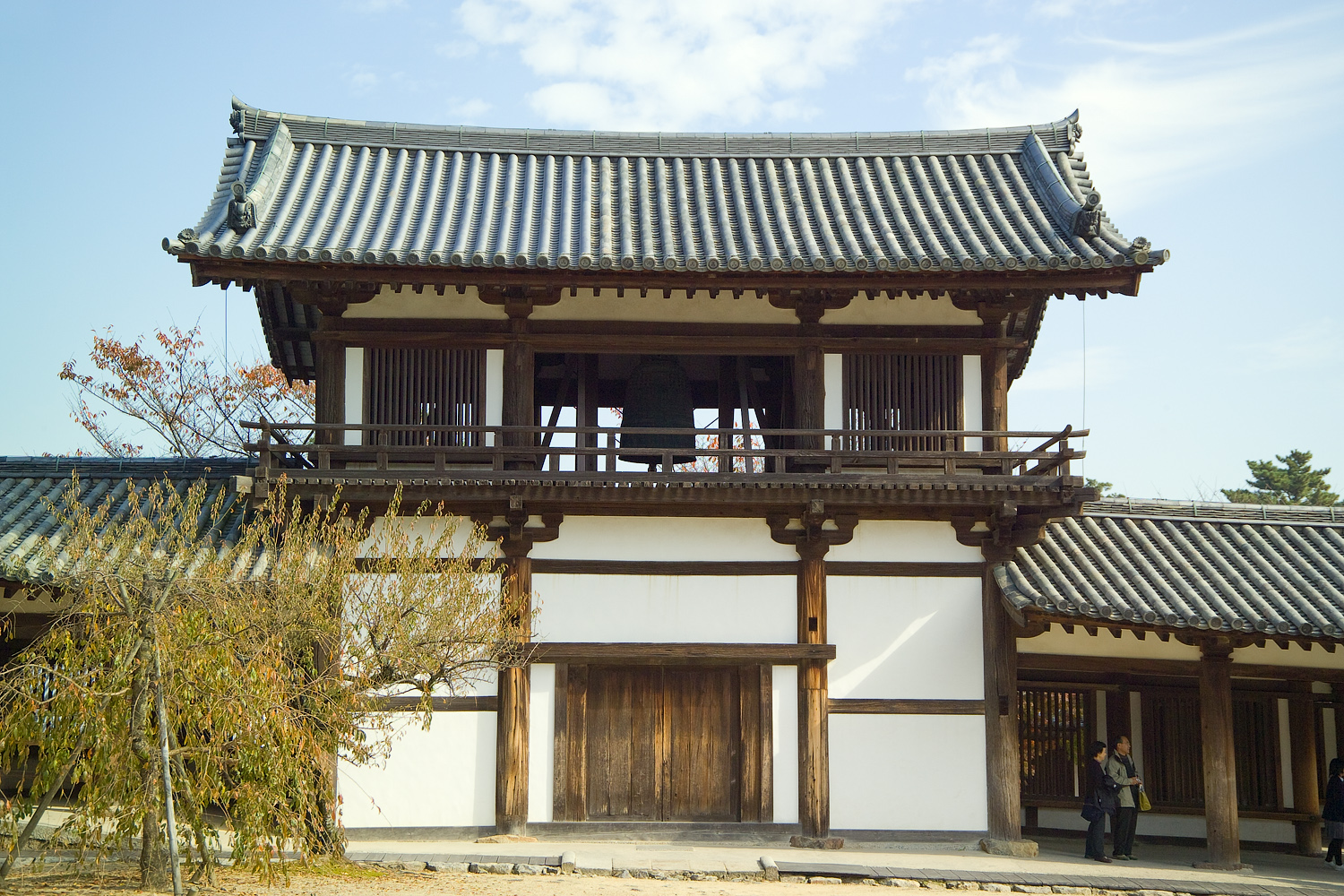
Hōryū-ji's Sai-in Shōrō, an example of Nara period bell tower

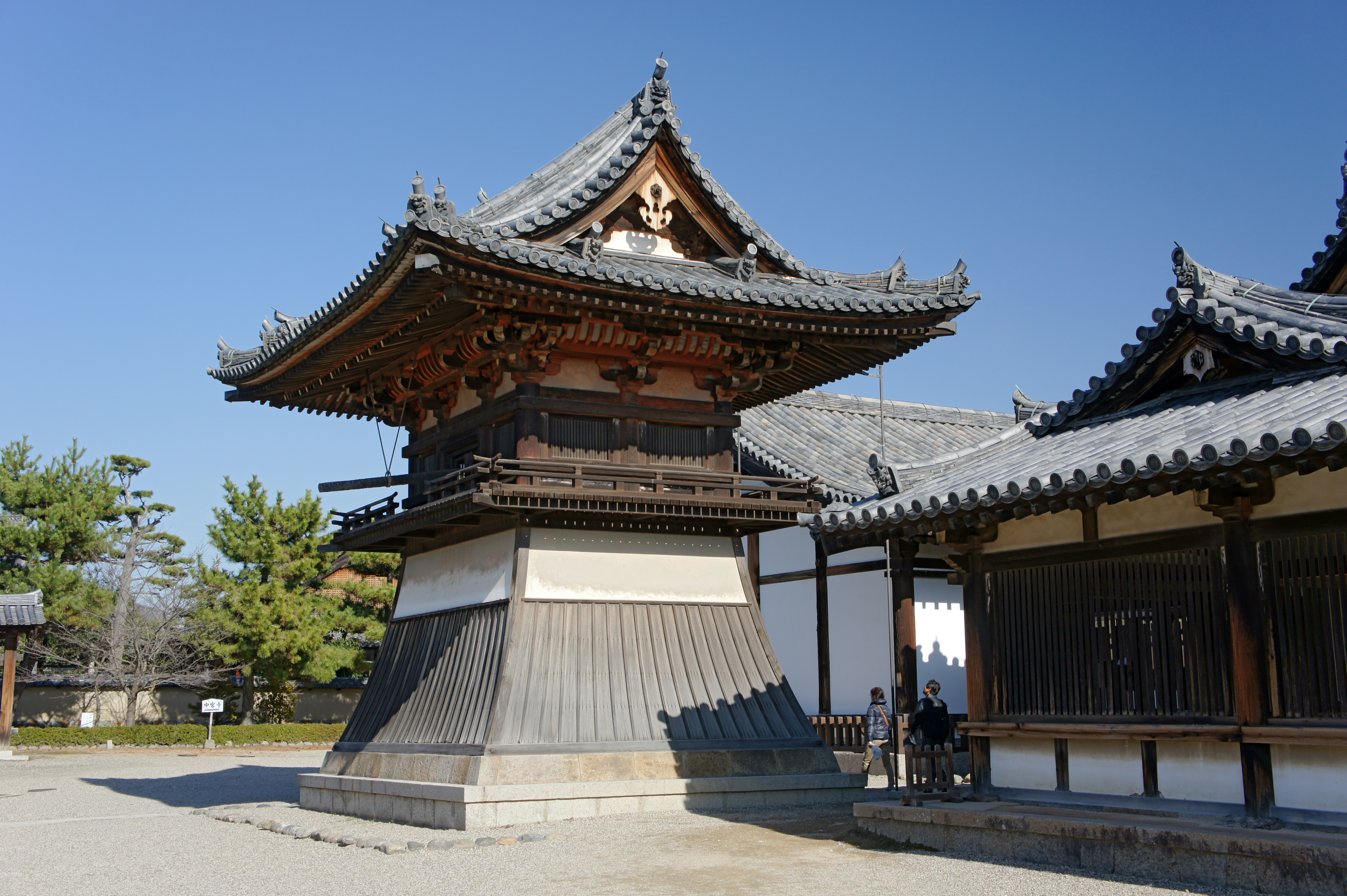
Hōryū-ji's Tō-in Shōrō, a typical hakamagoshi type

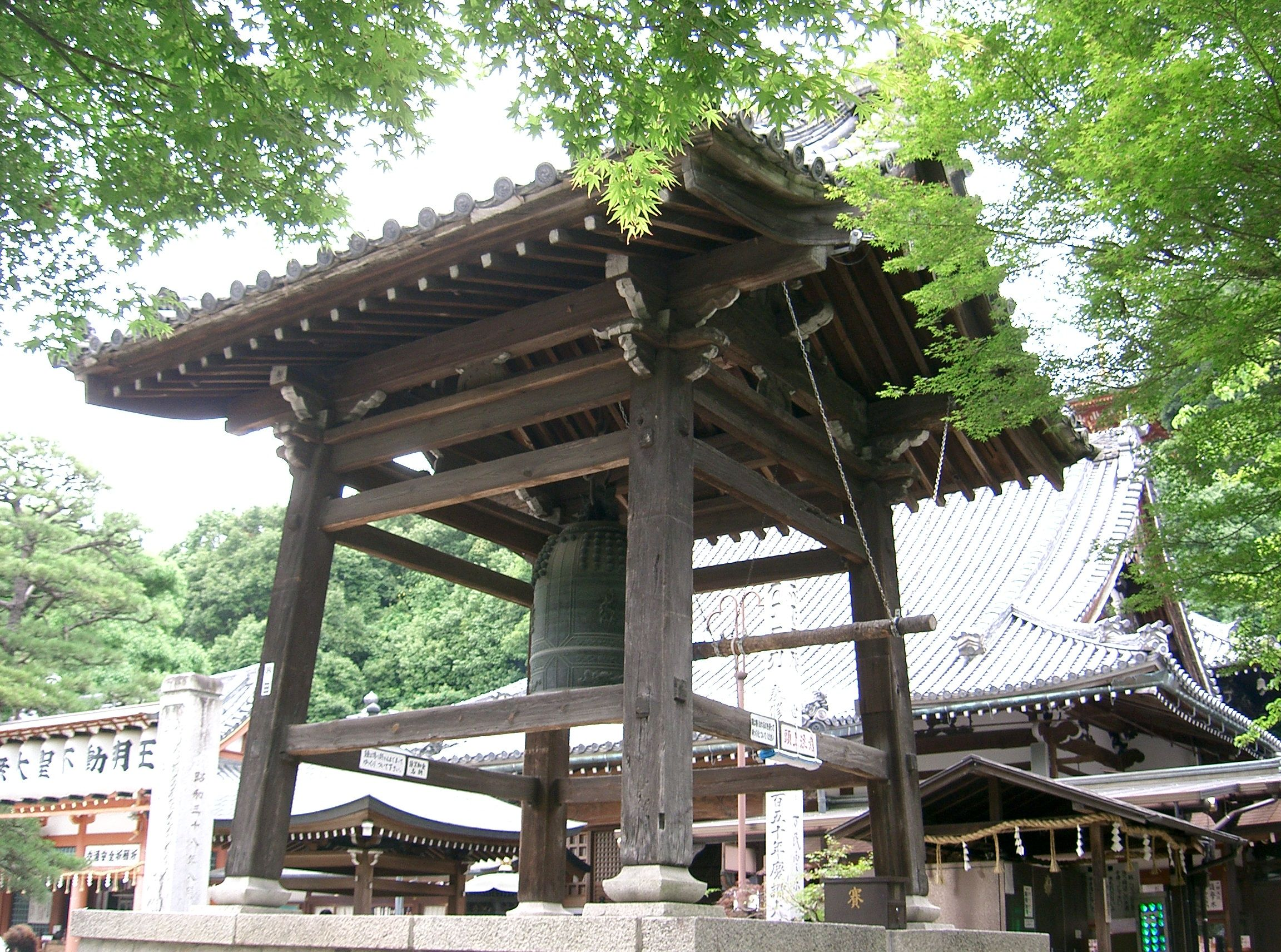
Takidani-hudōmyōō-ji Shōrō

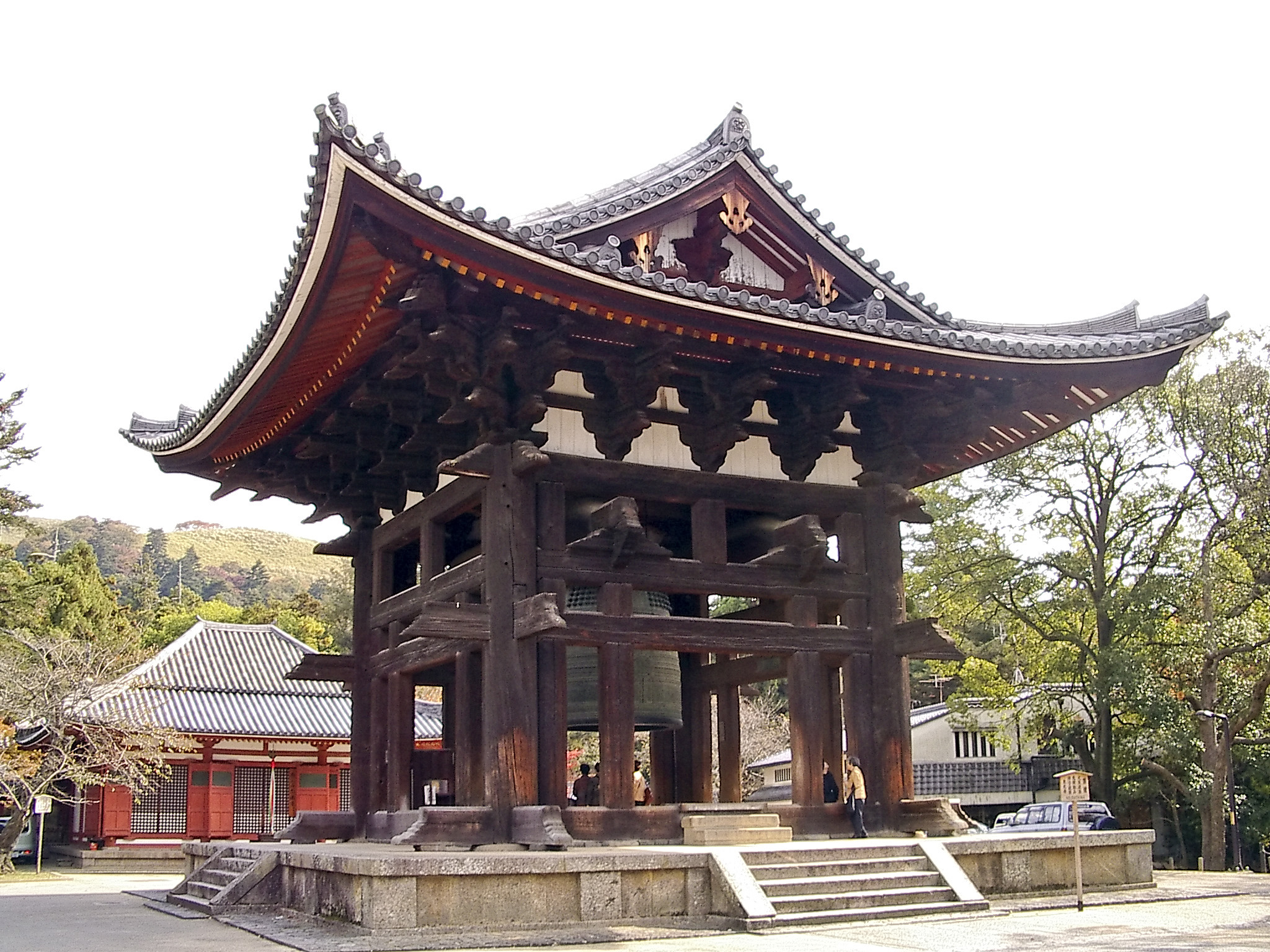
Tōdai-ji's bell tower, an example of the fukihanachi type, although much larger than the average

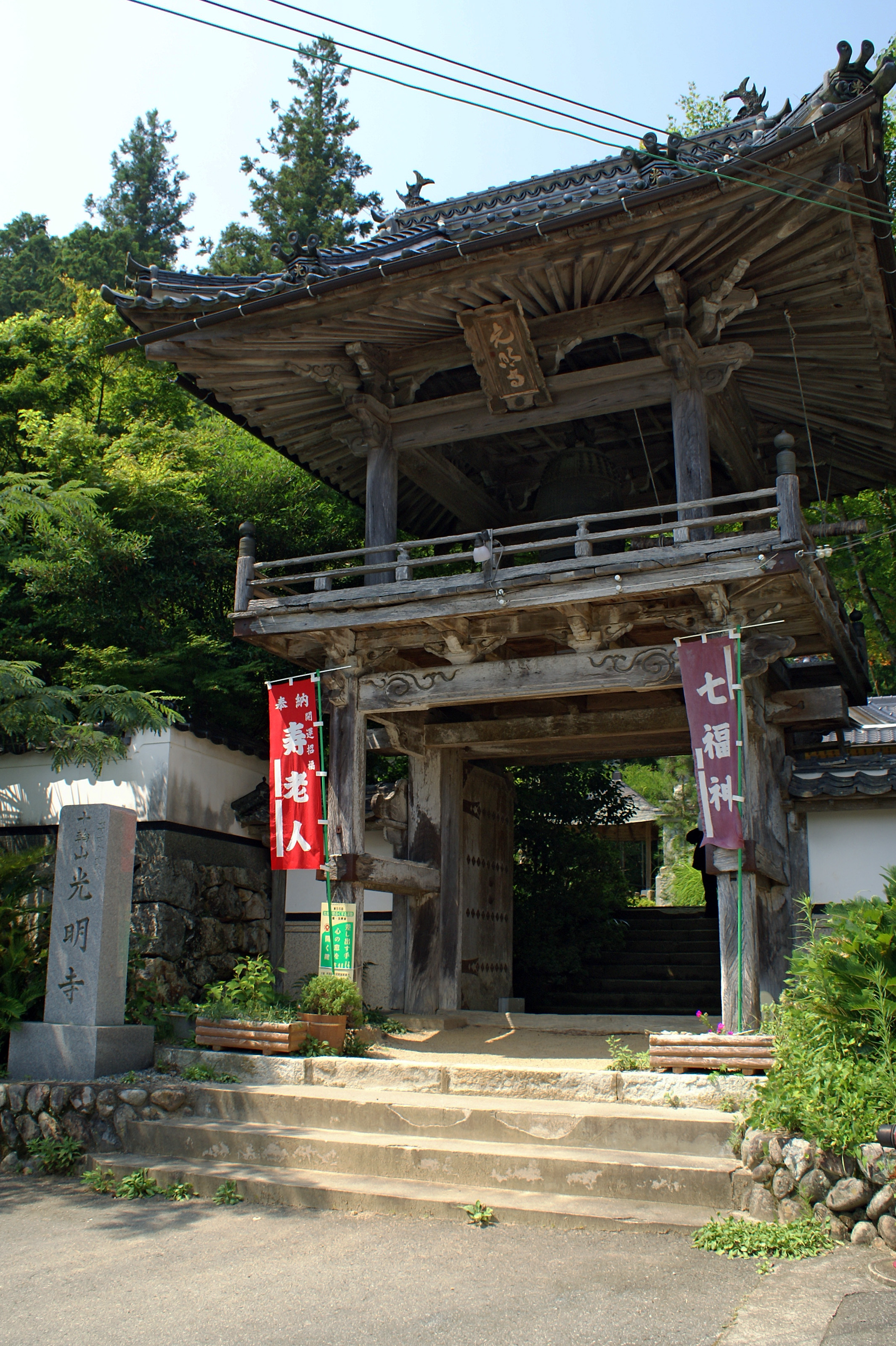
Sometimes the bell is installed in the rōmon.

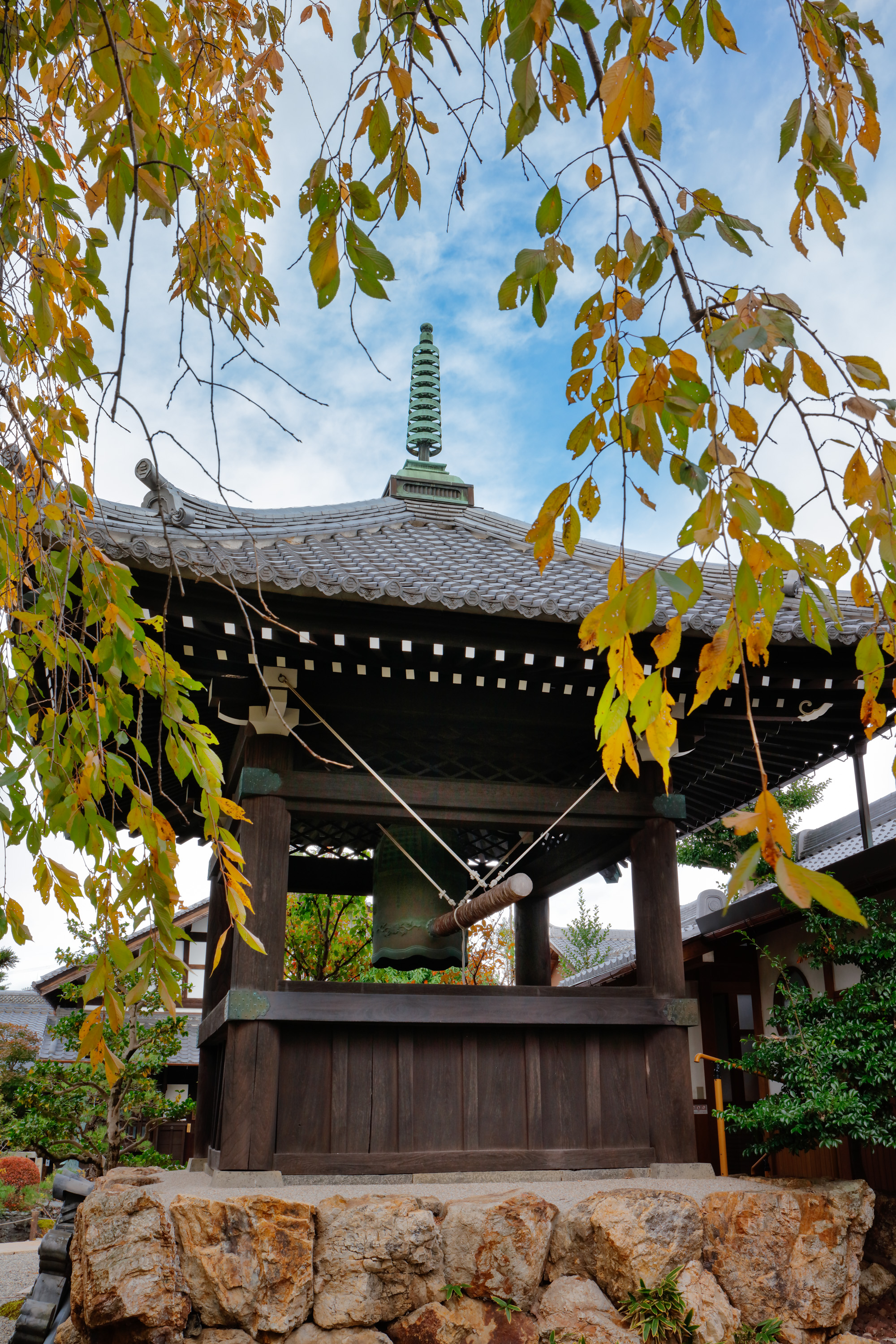

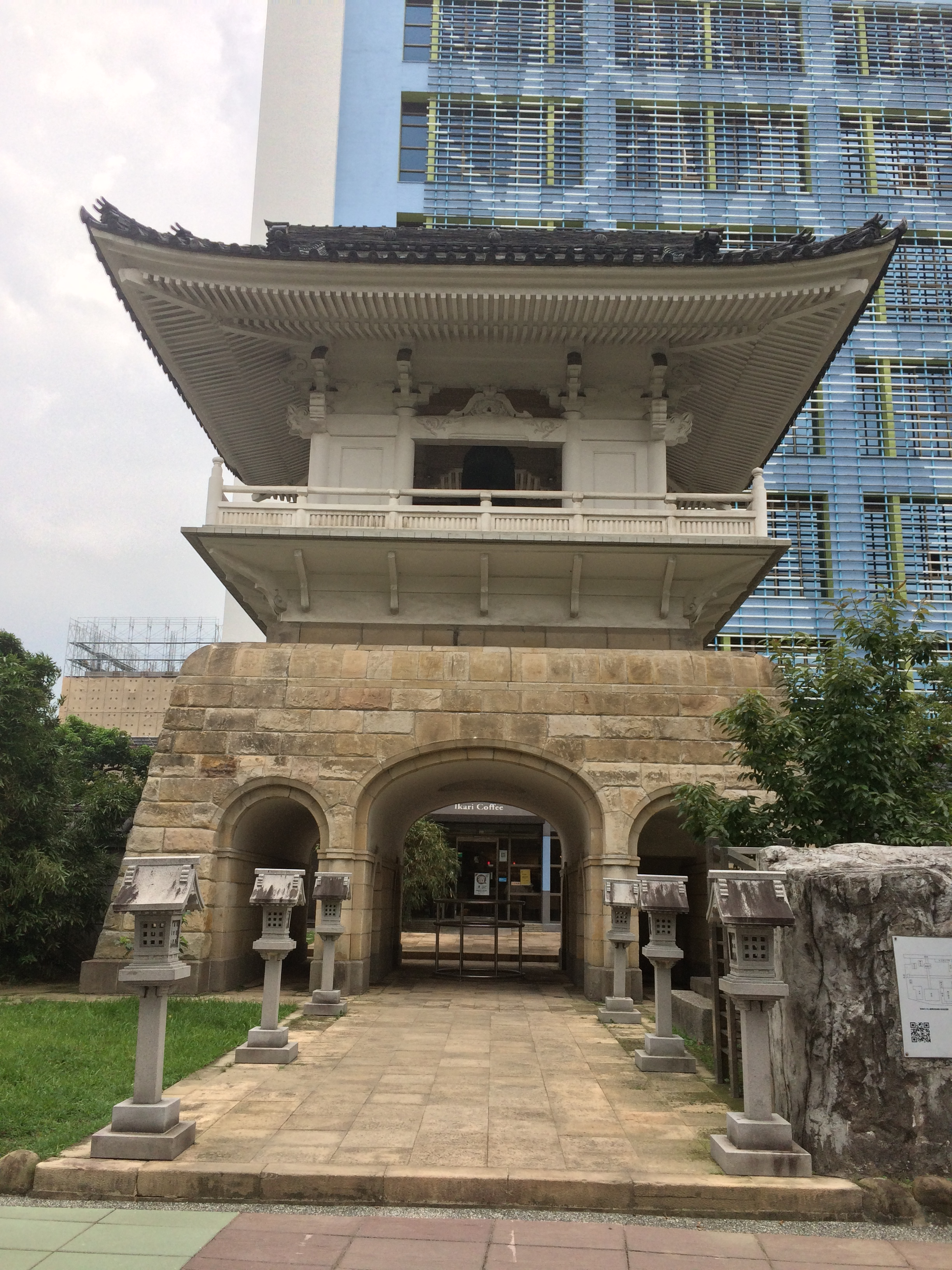
Shōrō in Taipei, Taiwan

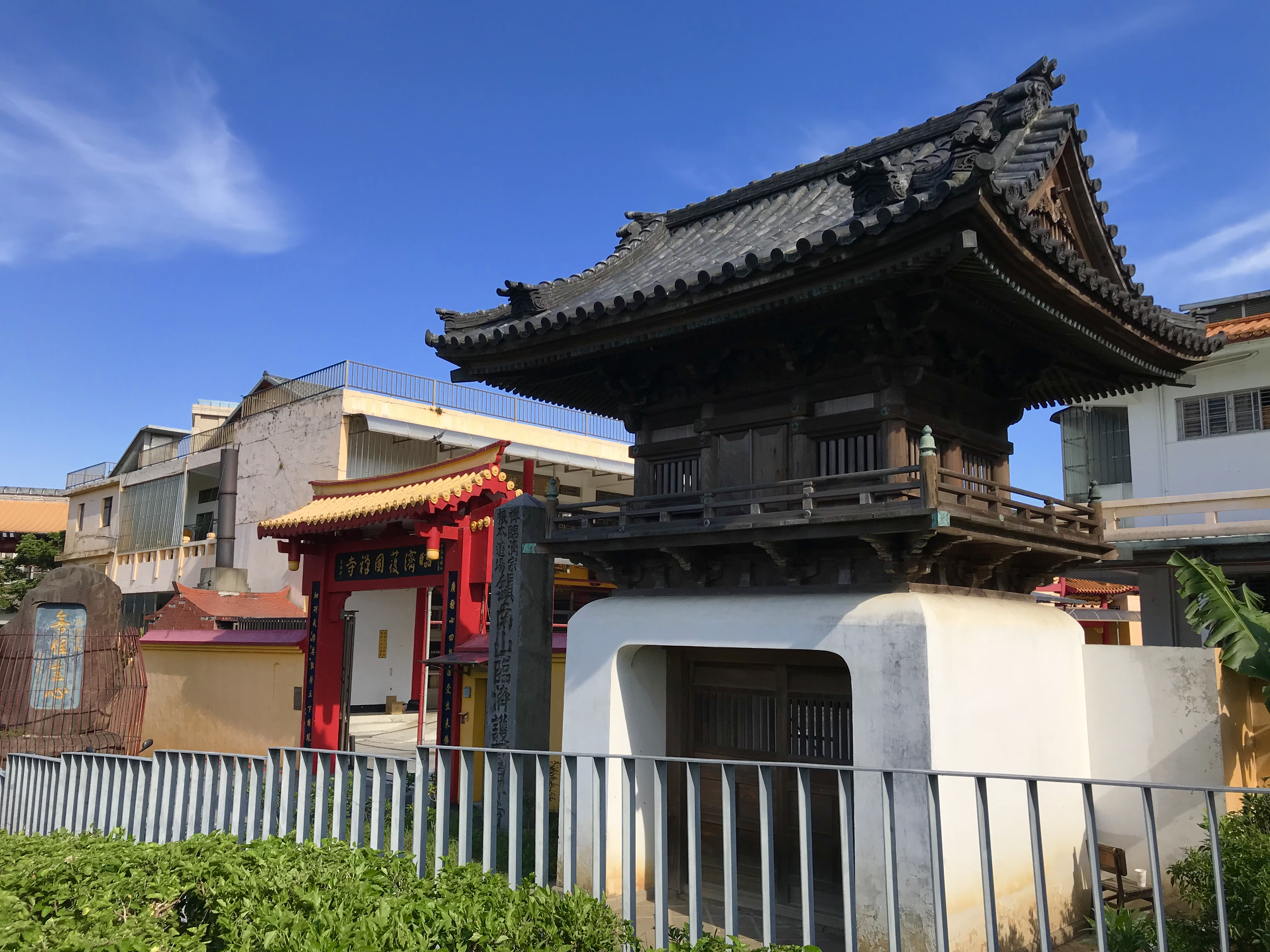
Shōrō in Taipei, Taiwan

== See also ==
- Glossary of Shinto
