= Ishii, Tokushima =

Ishii 石井町
- Town
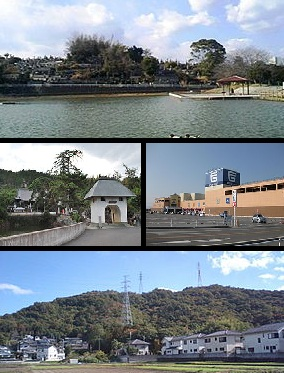
- Top: Maeyama Park; Middle: Dōgaku-ji and Fuji Grand Ishii; Bottom: Mount Kinobe

- Flag Emblem
- Interactive map of Ishii
- Location in Japan
- Coordinates: 34°4′N 134°26′E
- Country: Japan
- Region: Shikoku
- Prefecture: Tokushima
- District: Myōzai

Government
  - Mayor: Tomohito Kobayashi

Area
  - Total: 28.85 km^{2} (11.14 sq mi)

Population (June 30, 2022)
  - Total: 25,219
  - Density: 874.1/km^{2} (2,264/sq mi)
- Time zone: UTC+09:00 (JST)
- City hall address: 121-1 Takagawara, Takagawara, Ishii-cho, Myozai-gun, Tokushima-ken 〒779-3295
- Website: Official website
- Symbols
- Bird: Japanese bush warbler
- Flower: Wisteria
- Tree: Ginkgo biloba

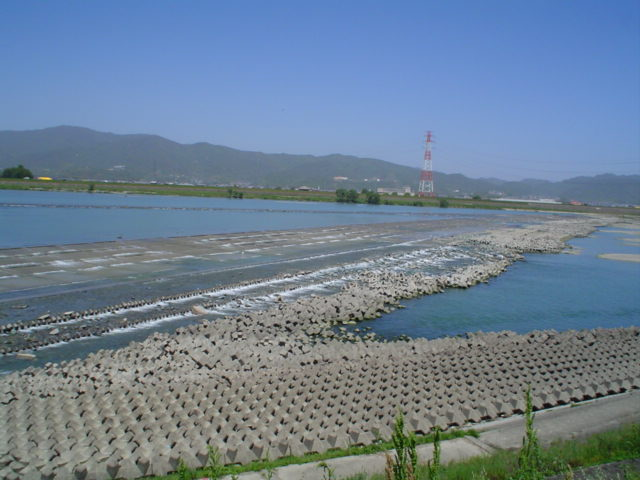
Yoshino River at Ishii

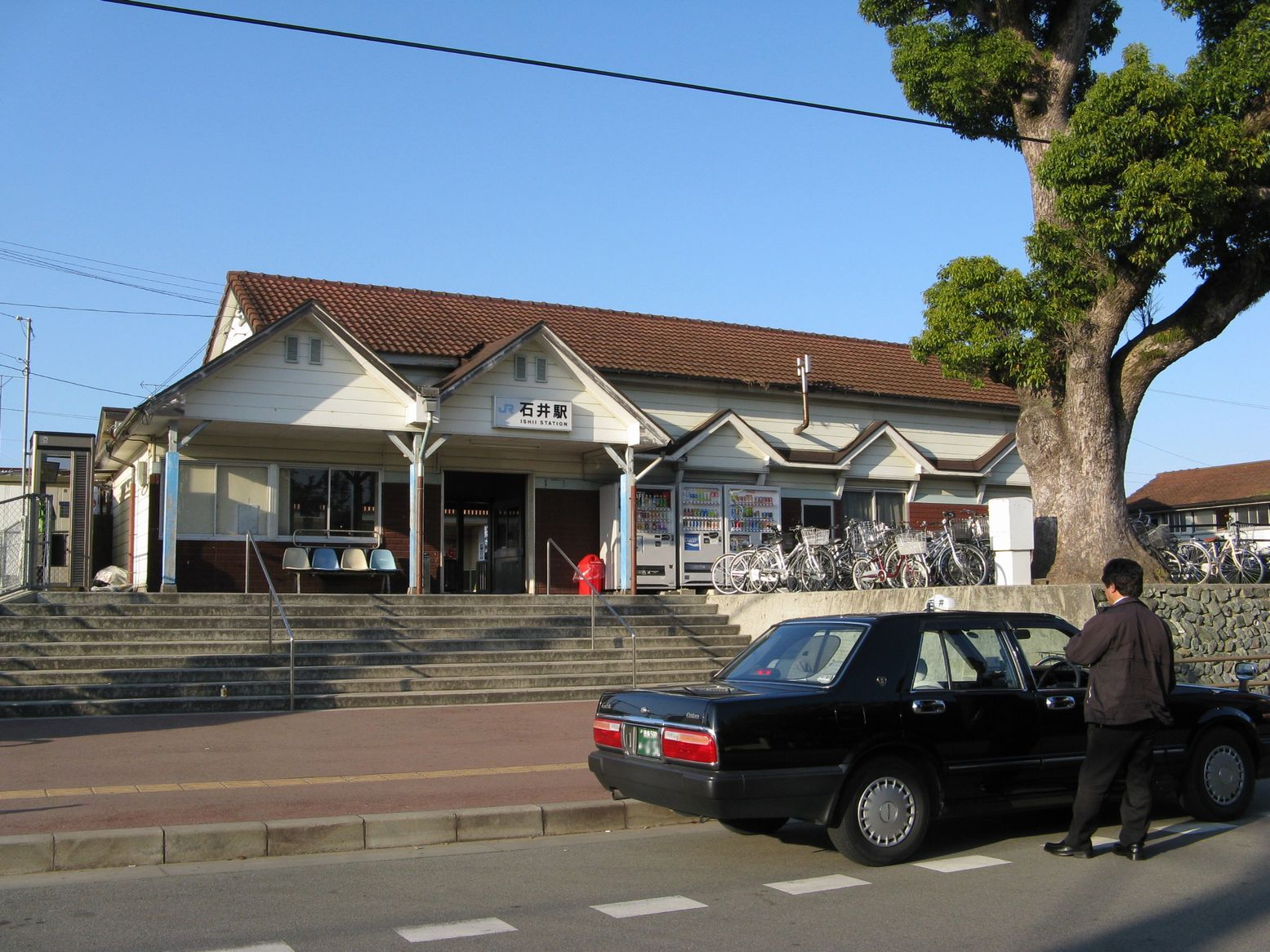
Ishii Station

Ishii (石井町, Ishii-chō) is a town located in Myōzai District, Tokushima Prefecture, Japan. As of 30 June 2022, the town had an estimated population of 25,219 in 10820 households and a population density of 870 persons per km^{2}. The total area of the town is 28.85 square kilometres (11.14 sq mi).

== Geography ==
Ishii is located in northeastern Tokushima Prefecture on the island of Shikoku. On the north side of the town, the Yoshino River flows from east to west, and near the center of the town, the Iio River, which is a tributary of the Yoshino River, meanders. The land is almost all flat except for the mountains along the city-town border on the south side of the town.

=== Neighbouring municipalities ===
Tokushima Prefecture

- Aizumi
- Itano
- Kamiita
- Kamiyama
- Tokushima
- Yoshinogawa

== Climate ==
Ishii has a humid subtropical climate (Köppen Cfa) characterized by warm summers and cool winters with light snowfall. The average annual temperature in Ishii is 15.2 °C. The average annual rainfall is 2128 mm with September as the wettest month. The temperatures are highest on average in August, at around 26.4 °C, and lowest in January, at around 4.5 °C.

== Demographics ==
Per Japanese census data, the population of Ishii has remained relatively stable for the past 60 years.

Historical population
Year	Pop.	±%
1920	18,459	—
1930	19,243	+4.2%
1940	18,599	−3.3%
1950	24,668	+32.6%
1960	21,505	−12.8%
1970	21,219	−1.3%
1980	24,434	+15.2%
1990	25,207	+3.2%
2000	26,023	+3.2%
2010	25,965	−0.2%

== History ==
As with all of Tokushima Prefecture, the area of Ishii was part of ancient Awa Province. The village of Ishii was established within Myozai District, Tokushima with the creation of the modern municipalities system on October 1, 1889. It was raised to town status on November 1, 1907. Ishii annexed the neighboring villages of Urasho, Takahara, Aihata and Takagawara on March 31, 1955.

== Government ==
Ishii has a mayor-council form of government with a directly elected mayor and a unicameral town council of 14 members. Itano, together with the other municipalities of Myozai District, contributes two members to the Tokushima Prefectural Assembly. In terms of national politics, the town is part of Tokushima 1st district of the lower house of the Diet of Japan.

== Economy ==
Ishii has primarily an agricultural economy; however, due to its geographic proximity to Tokushima, it is increasingly becoming a commuter town. Nippon Ham and Morinaga Milk Industry are major employers.

== Education ==
Ishii has six public elementary schools and two public middle schools operated by the town government and one public high school operated by the Tokushima Prefectural Department of Education. The Tokushima Prefectural College of Agriculture is located in Ishii.

== Transportation ==
=== Railway ===
JR Shikoku - Tokushima Line

- Shimoura - Ishii

=== Highways ===
- National Route 192
- National Route 318

== Local attractions ==
- Awa Kokubunni-ji ruins, National Historic Site
- Dōgaku-ji
