= Tokushima Prefectural Museum =

- 徳島県立博物館
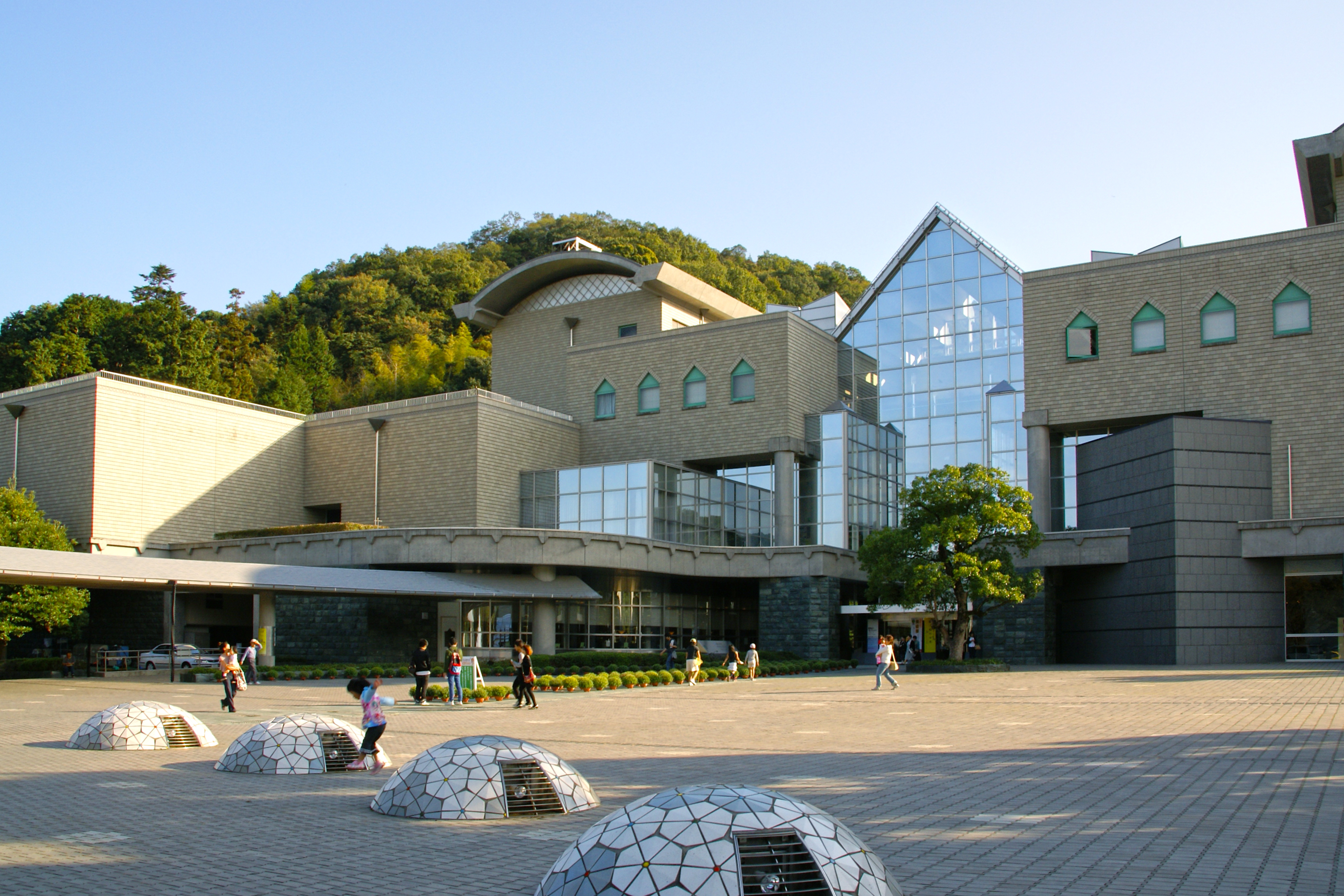

General information
- Location: Bunka-no-mori Park, Hachiman-chō, Tokushima, Tokushima Prefecture, Japan
- Coordinates: 34°2′23″N 134°31′34″E
- Opened: 1990
- Inaugurated: 1959

Website
- homepage

Tokushima Prefectural Museum (徳島県立博物館, Tokushima Kenritsu Hakubutsukan) is a prefectural museum in Tokushima, Japan, dedicated to the nature, archaeology, history, folklore, and art of Tokushima Prefecture. It first opened in 1959 and reopened in new premises in 1990.

== See also ==
- List of Historic Sites of Japan (Tokushima)
- Awa Province (Tokushima)
