= Ichinomiya Shrine (Tokushima) =

Shinto shrine in Tokushima, Japan

Ichinomiya Jinja 一宮神社
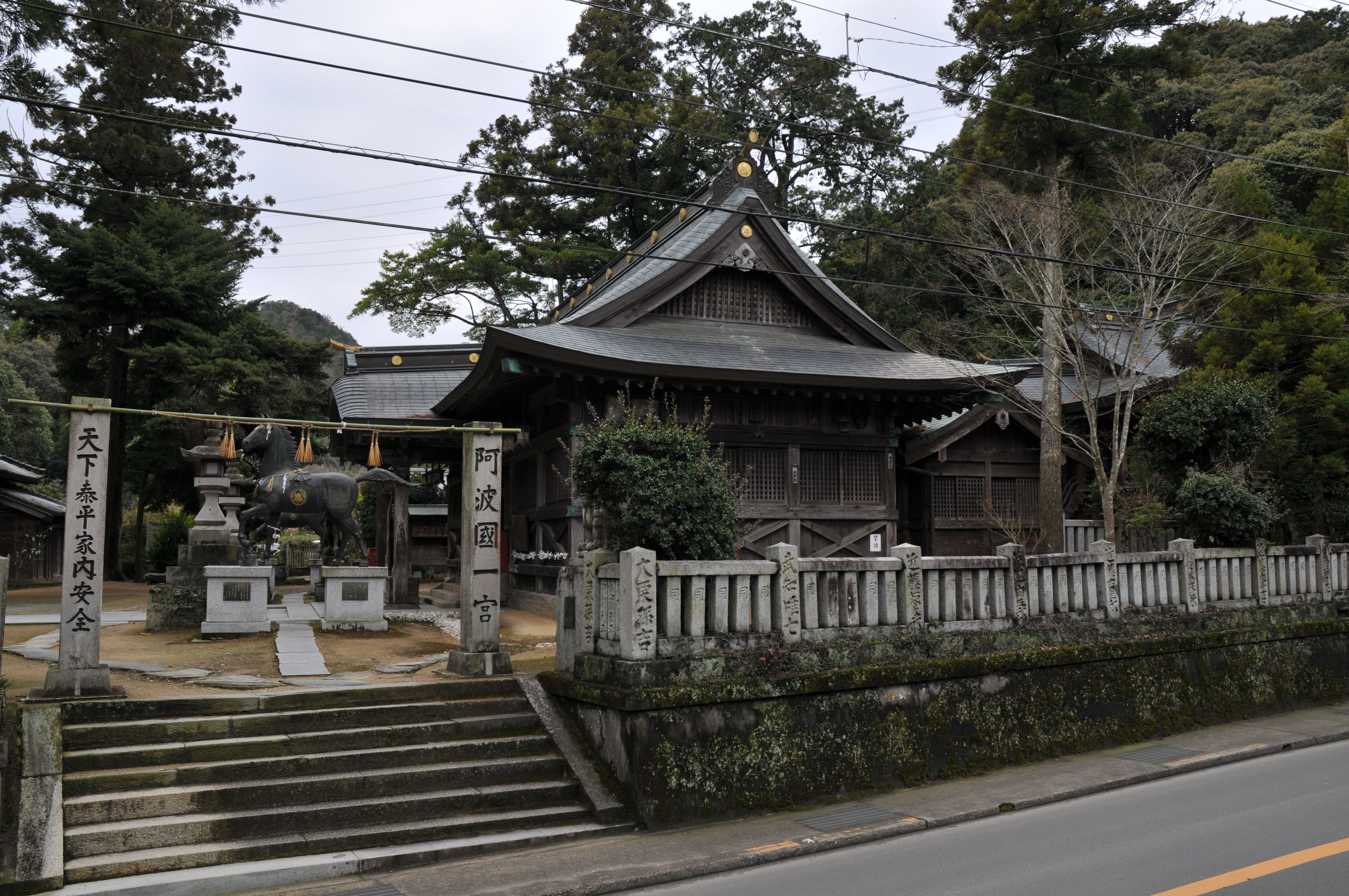
- Ichinomiya Jinja

- Location within Tokushima Prefecture Location within Japan

Religion
- Affiliation: Shinto
- Deity: Ōgetsu-hime -no-Mikoto; Ohirume no Mikoto
- Festival: October 18

Location
- Location: 237 Nishicho, Ichinomiya-cho, Tokushima-shi, Tokushima-ken
- Interactive map of Ichinomiya Jinja 一宮神社
- Coordinates: 34°2′16.1″N 134°27′45.5″E

Architecture
- Style: nagare-zukuri
- Established: late Heian period

Ichinomiya Jinja (一宮神社) is a Shinto shrine in the Ichinomiya neighborhood of the city of Tokushima in Tokushima Prefecture, Japan. It is one of the shrines claiming the title of ichinomiya of former Awa Province. The main festival of the shrine is held annually on October 18.

== Enshrined kami ==
The kami enshrined at Ichinomiya Jinja are:

- Ōgetsu-hime -no-Mikoto (大宜都比売命), the goddess of food
- Ohirume no Mikoto (八倉比売命), another name for Amaterasu.

== History ==
The shrine is located in the western part of Tokushima City and next to a Sengoku period mountain castle called "Ichinomiya Castle", which was controlled by the Ogasawara clan. The shrine was established in the latter half of the Heian period near the provincial capital as the original ichinomiya of the province, the Ōasahiko Shrine was located in Naruto and was considered to be inconveniently far from the capital. The shrine was intimately connected with the Buddhist temple of Dainichi-ji, which had been established in the early Heian period, and which was the 13th temple in the Shikoku pilgrimage route. Under the premodern system of shinbutsu-shūgō syncretism between Buddhism and Shinto, the Juichimen Kannon was the principal object of worship at the shrine.

The area was devastated by Chōsokabe Motochika during the wars of the Tenshō era. The shrine and temple were restored by Hachisuka Mitsutaka, the daimyō of Tokushima Domain in the early Edo period. With the separation of Buddhism and Shinto in the early Meiji period, the shrine and temple were separated, with the Juichiman Kannon transferred to the temple, where it displaced an image of Dainichi Nyorai as the honzon of the temple.

During the Meiji period era of State Shinto, the shrine was rated as a "prefectural shrine" under the Modern system of ranked Shinto Shrines

The Honden of the shrine dates from 1630, and is designated as an National Important Cultural Property.

The shrine is 4.1 kilometers from Kō Station on the JR Shikoku Tokushima Line.

== Gallery ==
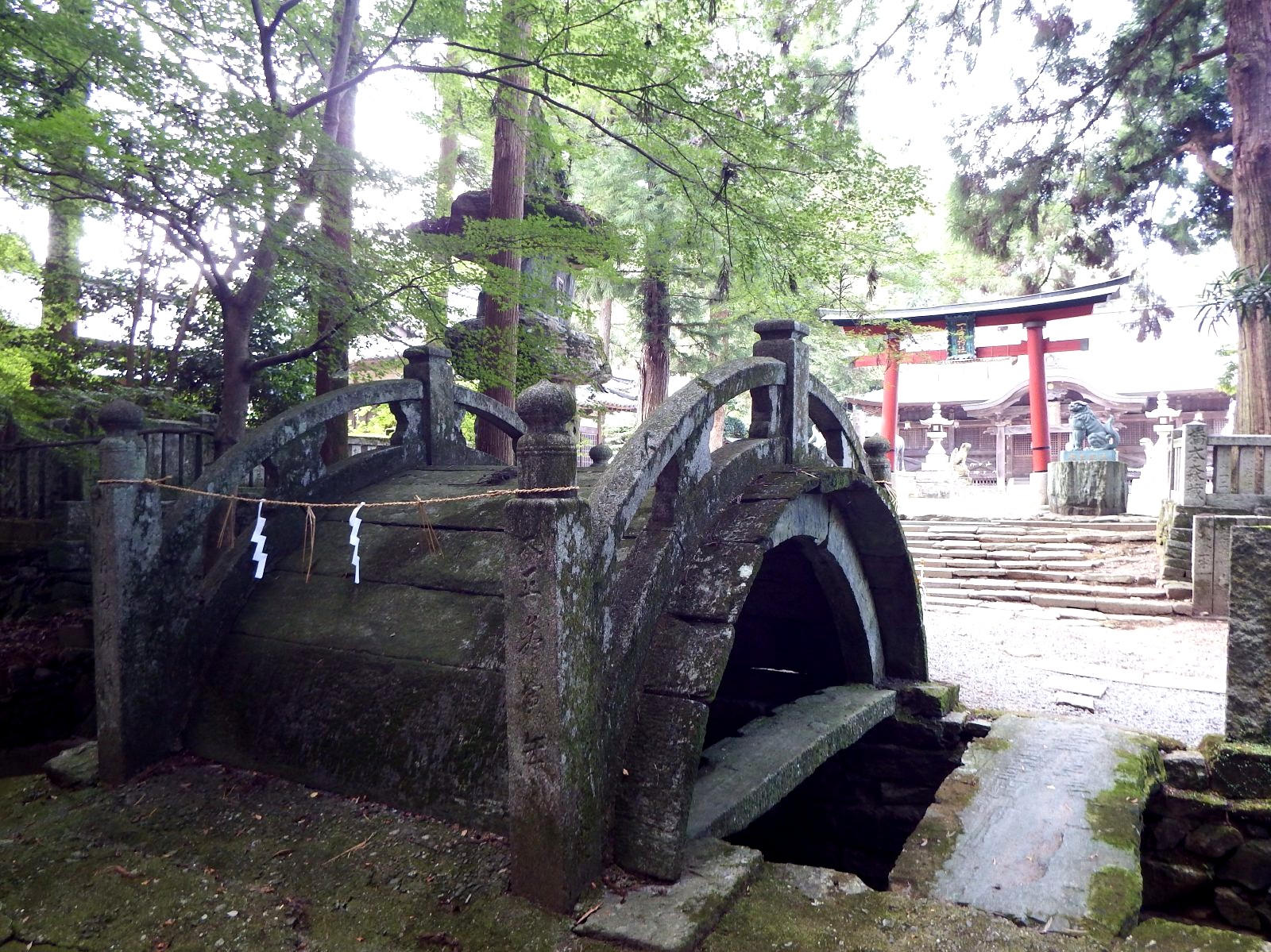
Taiko-bashi

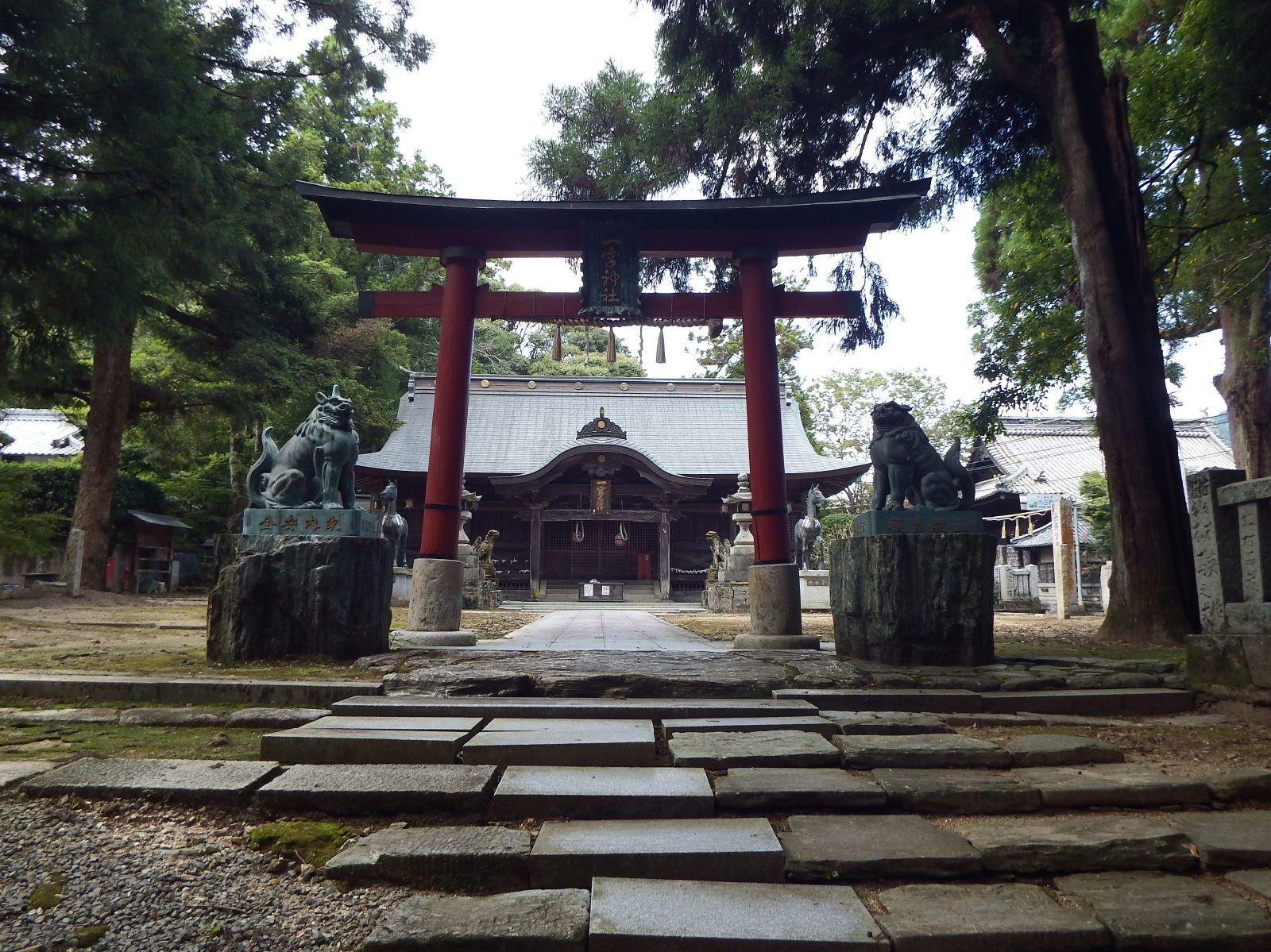
Front View

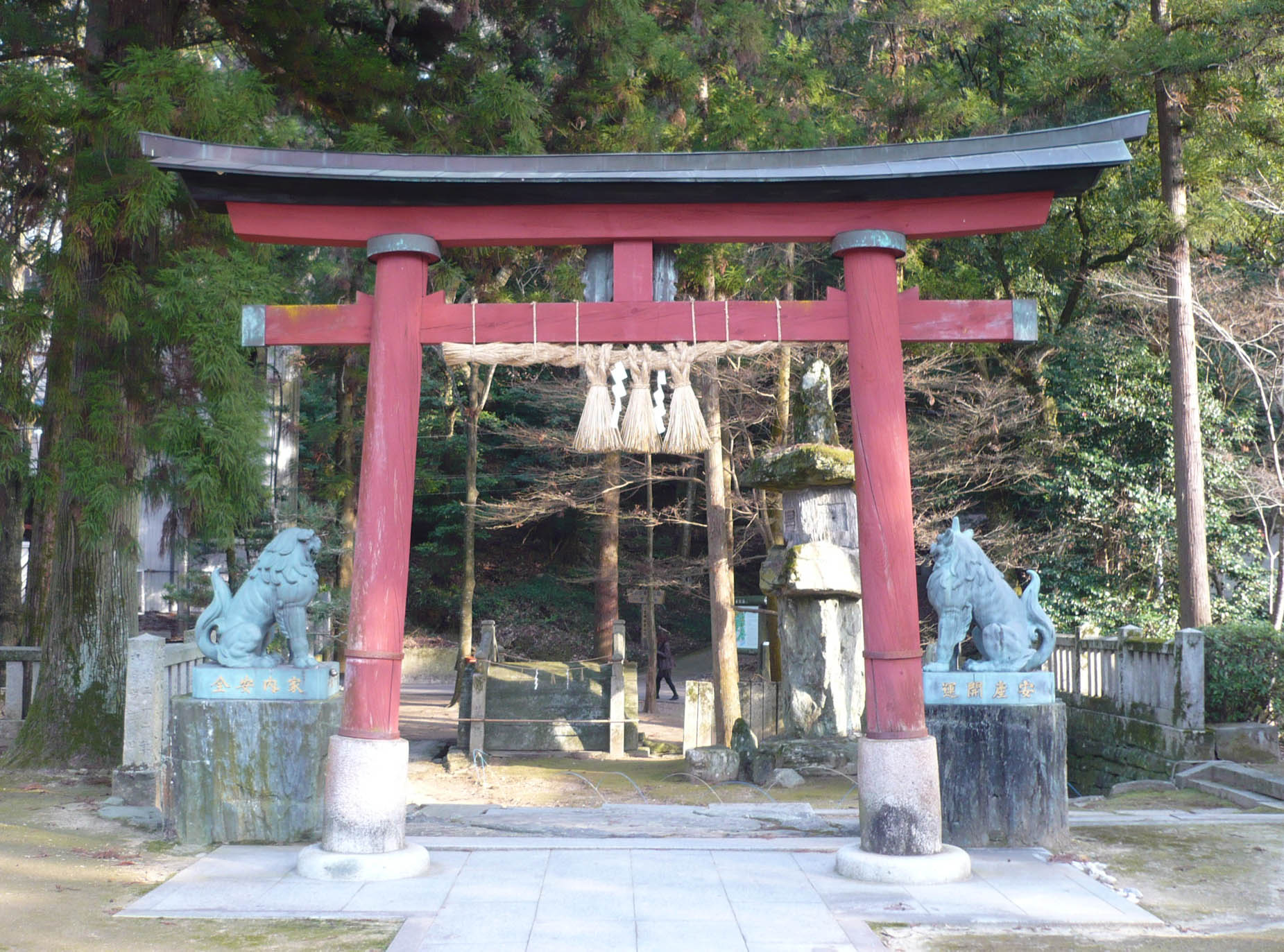
Torii

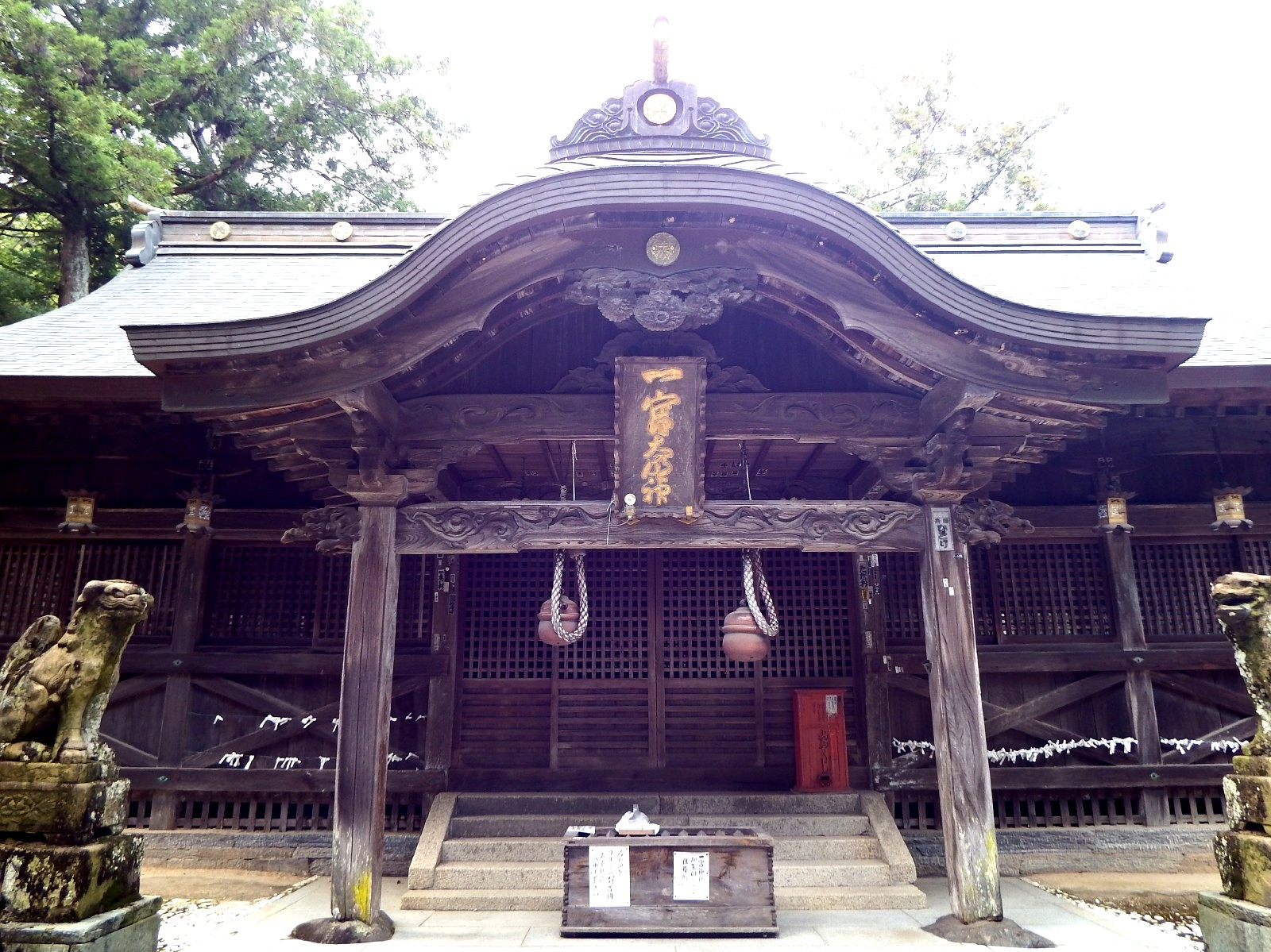
Haiden

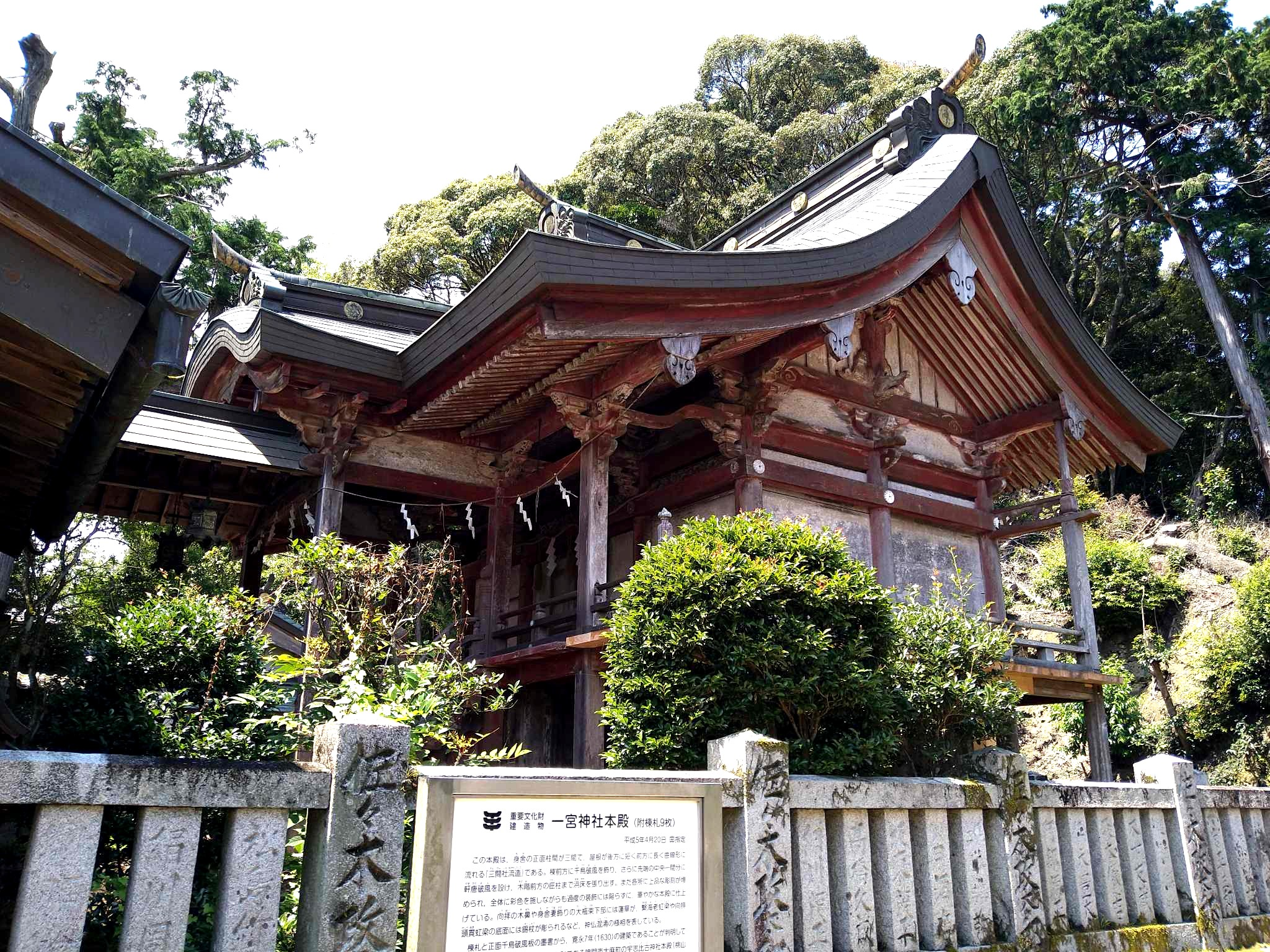
Honden (ICP)

== Cultural Properties ==
=== National Important Cultural Properties ===
- Honden (本殿 附棟札九枚), Edo period (1630); The three-bay shrine is built in Nagare-zukuri style, with a chidori gabled roof on the front and copper roofing. The veranda is one bay long and features carvings in the Karahafu style, with richly colored carvings at key points.

== See also ==
- List of Shinto shrines
- Ichinomiya
