= Tsubaki Shrine =

Shinto shrine in Suzuka, Mie, Japan

Tsubaki Shrine 都波岐神社
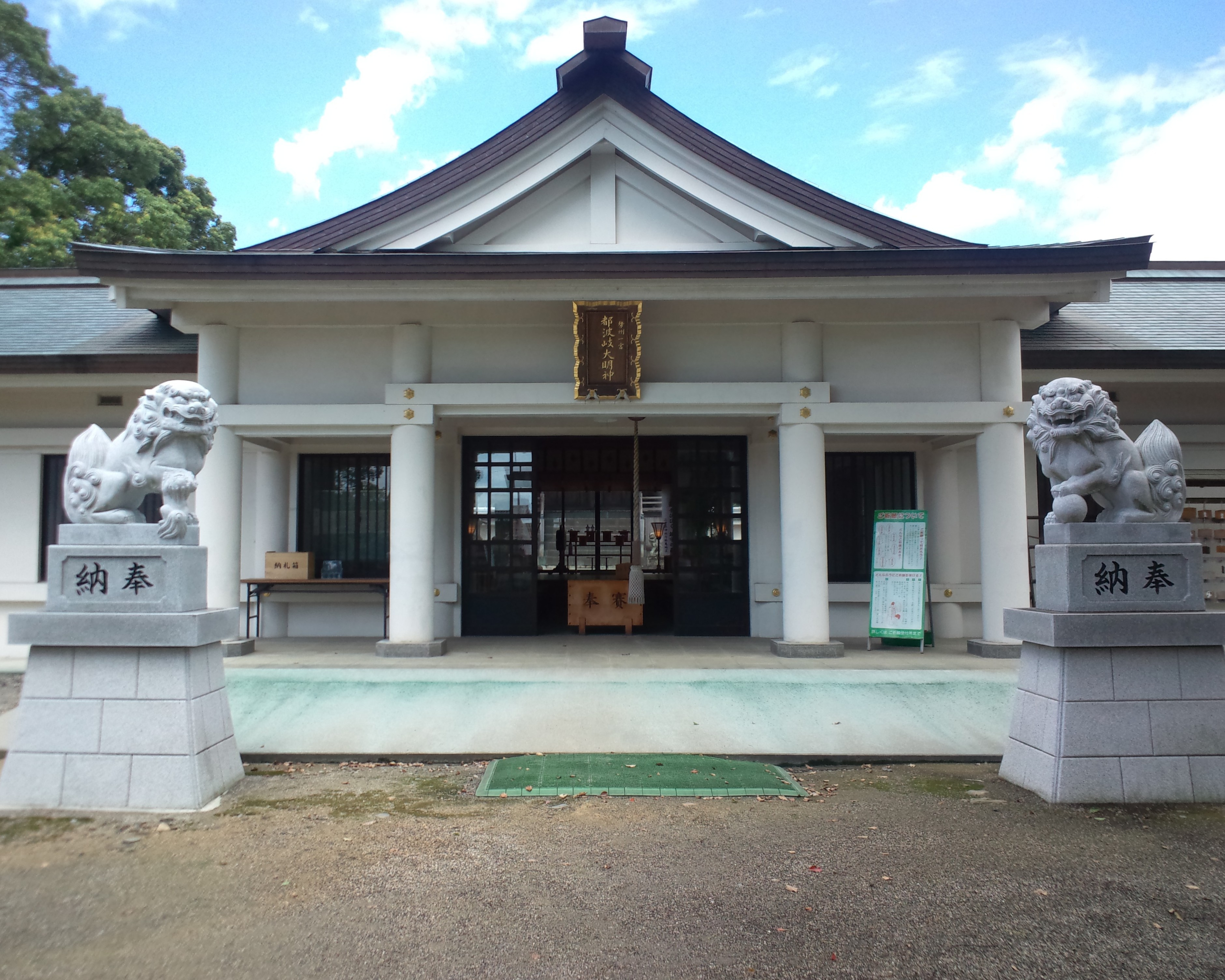
- Shaden of Tsubaki Shrine

- Location within Mie Prefecture Location within Japan

Religion
- Affiliation: Shinto
- Deity: Sarutahiko Ōkami
- Festival: October 10

Location
- Location: 1181 Ichinomiya-chō, Suzuka-shi, Mie-ken 513-0031
- Interactive map of Tsubaki Shrine 都波岐神社
- Coordinates: 34°54′4.5″N 136°36′4.5″E

Architecture
- Founder: c.Emperor Yūryaku

Tsubaki Shrine (都波岐神社) is a Shinto shrine in the Ichinomiya neighborhood of the city of Suzuka in Mie Prefecture, Japan. It is one of the two shrines which claim the title of ichinomiya of former Ise Province. The main festival of the shrine is held annually on October 10. It is also known as the Tsubaki-Nakato Jinja (都波岐奈加等神社), as the shrine consisted of two separate shrines, the Tsubaki Jinja and the Nakato Jinja, which were amalgamated in the Meiji period.

== Enshrined kami ==
The kami enshrined at Tsubaki Shrine is:

- Sarutahiko Ōkami (玉祖命), leader of the kunitsukami and patron of martial arts such as aikido.

The kami enshrined at Nakato Shrine are:

- Ama-no-kuno-no-Mikoto (天椹野命), ancestor of the Nakato clan
- Nakatsutsuo-no-mikoto (中筒之男命), one of the Sumiyoshi sanjin

== History ==
The origins of Tsubaki Shrine are unknown. Although there is no documentary evidence, the shrine's legend states that it was founded during the reign of the semi-legendary Emperor Yūryaku (reigned 456 to 479). Both shrines first appear in historical documentation in the Engishiki records from the early Heian period, and are classed as "minor shrines". Kūkai is alleged to have visited the shrine, and to have donated two masks for the lion dance. It is uncertain also when it began to be regarded as the ichinomiya of the province, although this is contested by Tsubaki Grand Shrine, (also in Suzuka); however by 1079 it had advanced to the highest court ranking, and was made a shrine for prayers to the imperial family by Emperor Go-Shirakawa. However, the shrine was razed by Oda Nobunaga during his conquest of Ise Province and all old records were lost. The shrine was revived by the Hitotsuyanagi clan, daimyō of Kanbe Domain during the early Edo Period.

During the Meiji period era of State Shinto, the shrine was rated as a Prefectural shrine in 1871 under the Modern system of ranked Shinto Shrines.

== Gallery ==
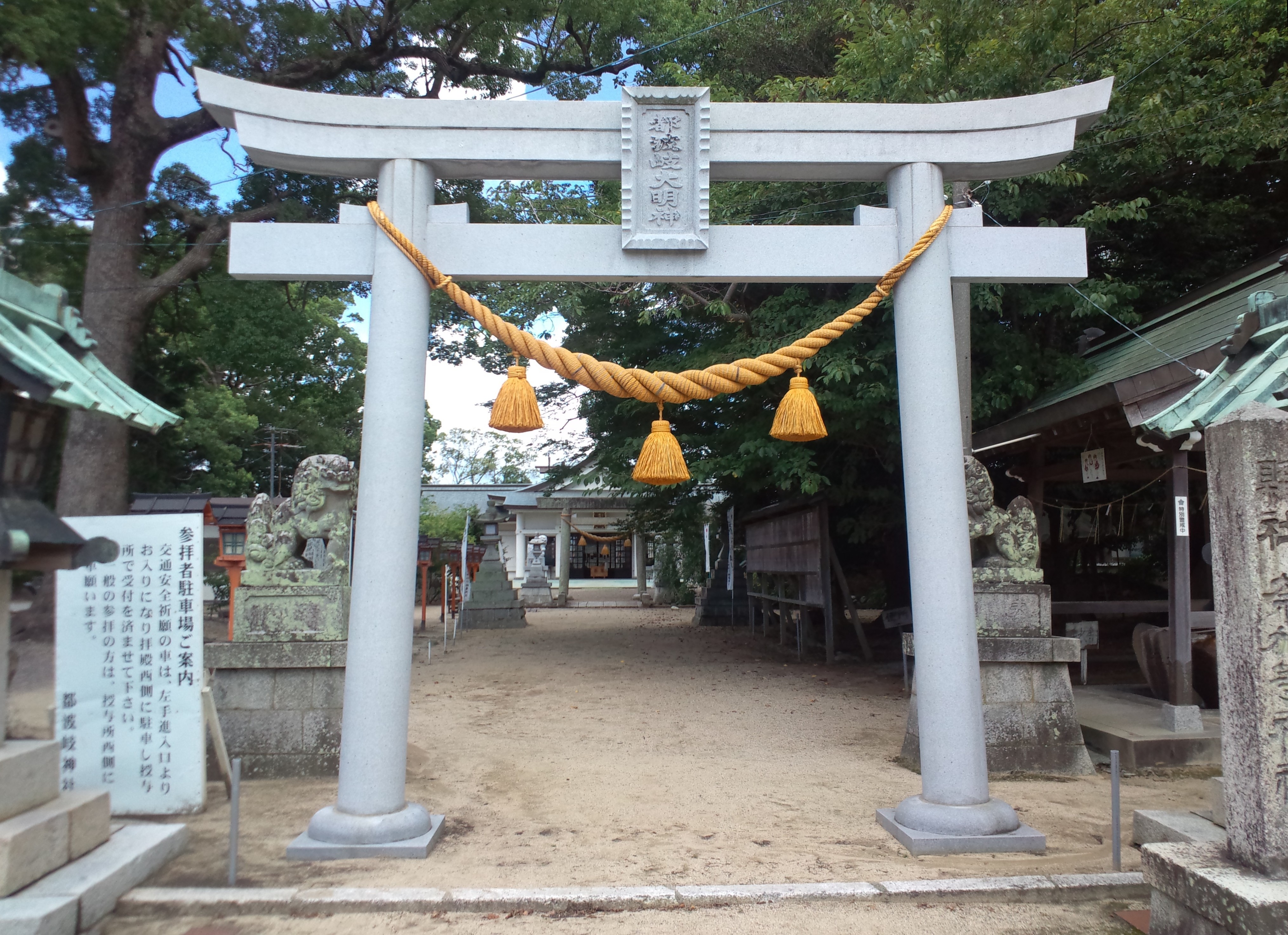
Entry with Torii

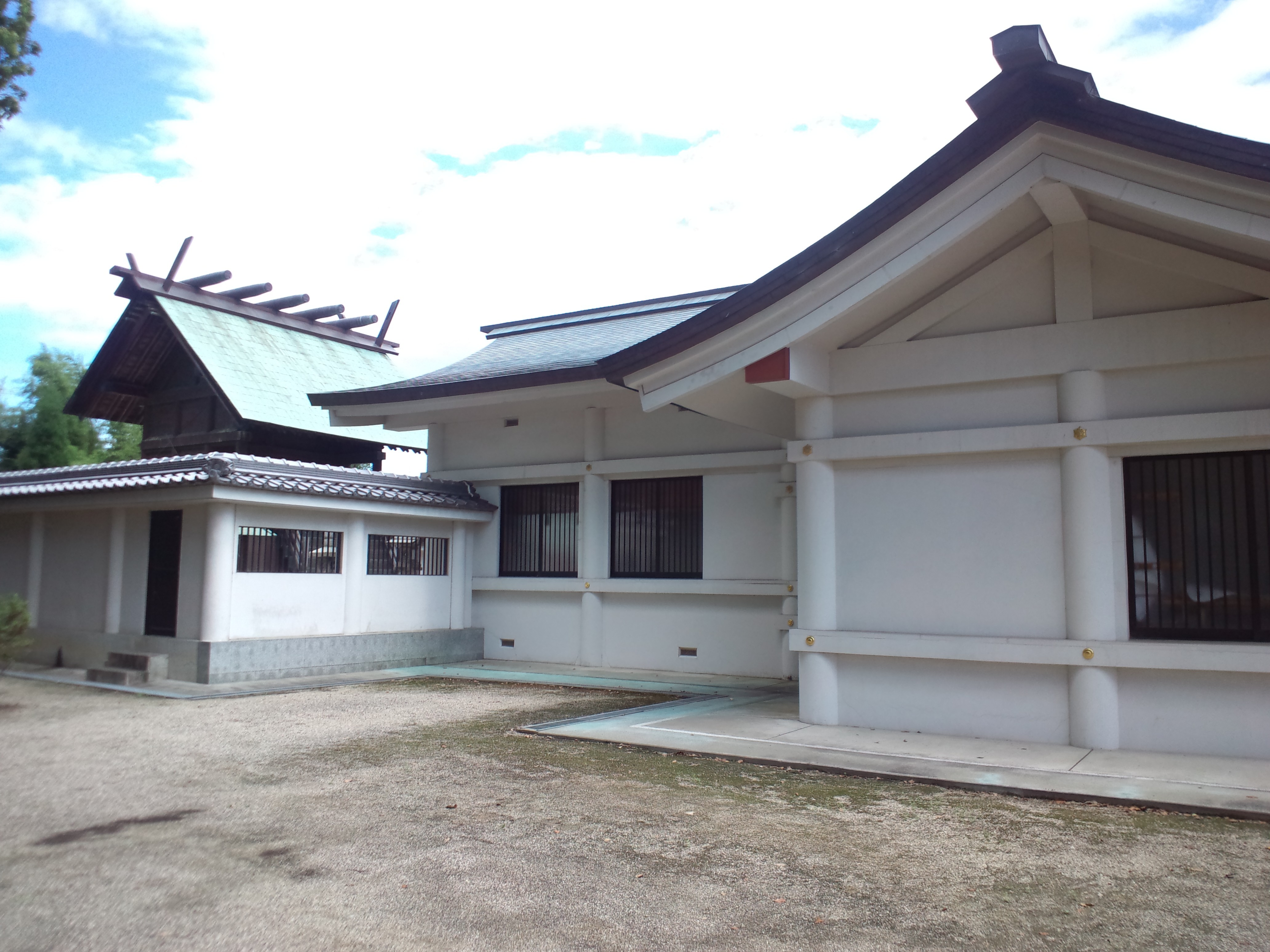
Shaden

== See also ==
- List of Shinto shrines
- Ichinomiya
- Tsubaki Grand Shrine the other Ise Ichinomiya
