= Shirahige Shrine =

Shinto shrine in Shiga Prefecture, Japan

Shirahige Jinja 白鬚神社
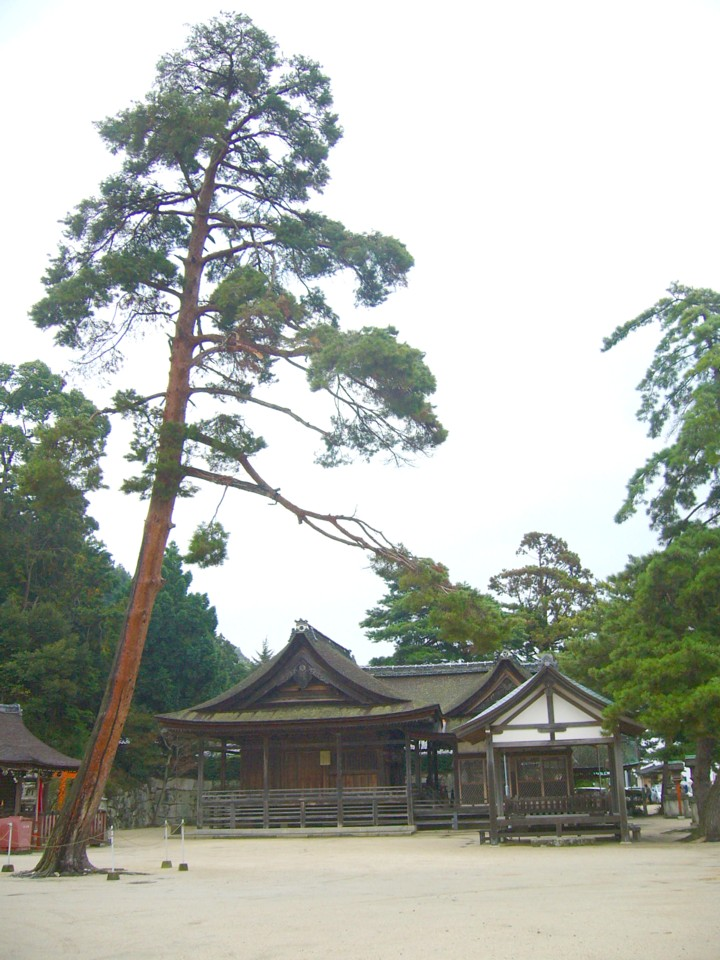

- Location within Japan

Religion
- Affiliation: Shinto
- Deity: Sarutahiko Okami
- Type: Shirahige Jinja

Location
- Location: 215 Ukawa, Takashima, Shiga Prefecture
- Interactive map of Shirahige Jinja 白鬚神社
- Coordinates: 35°16′28″N 136°00′40″E

Architecture
- Established: 5 BCE

Website
- shirahigejinja.com

Shirahige Jinja (白鬚神社) is a Shinto shrine in Takashima in Shiga Prefecture, Japan. The shrine is dedicated to Sarutahiko Okami. It is the head shrine of the Shirahige Shrines around the country. The shrine's annual festivals are on May 3 and September 5–6.

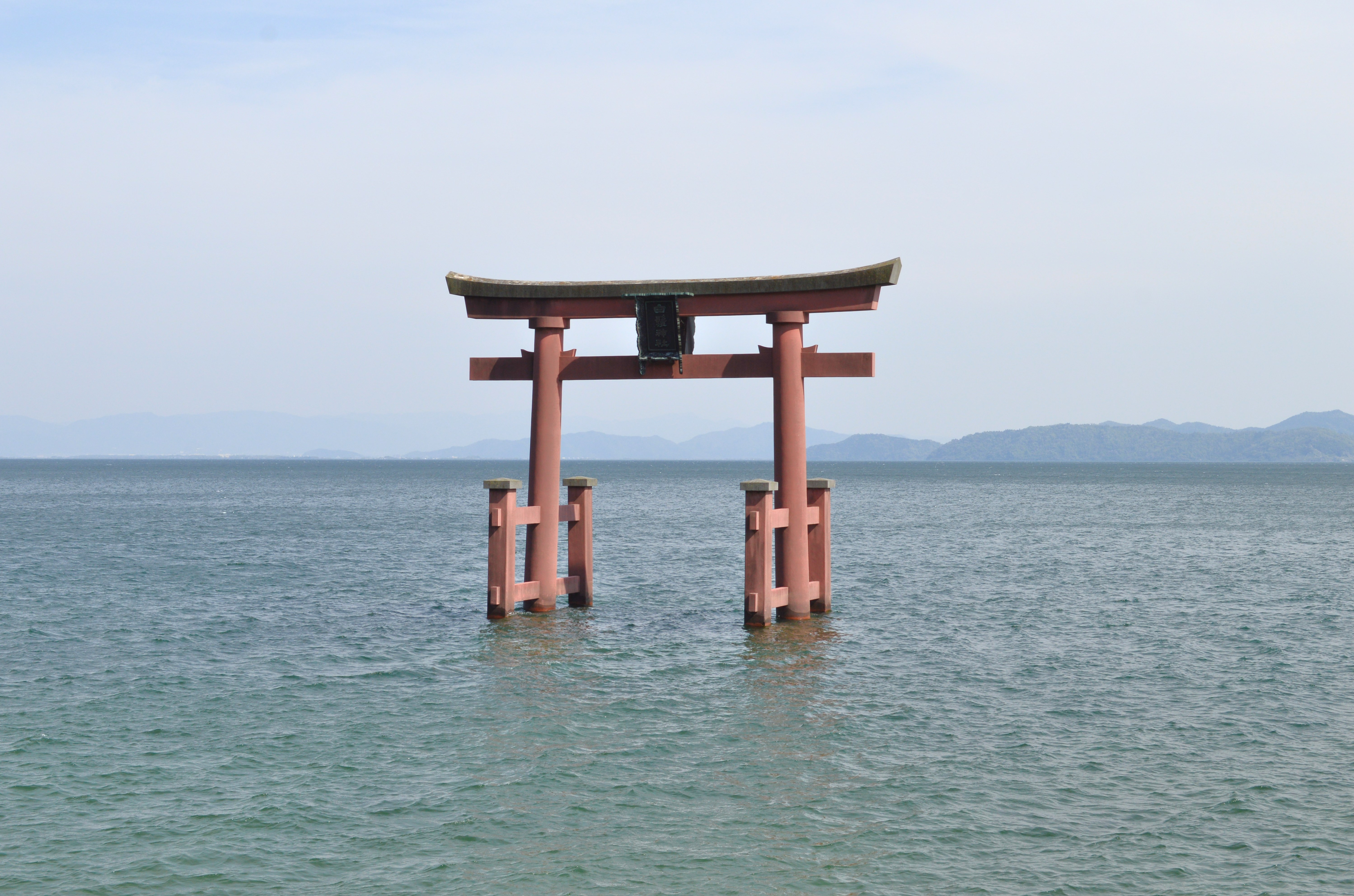
The floating torii at Shirahige

== See also ==
- Modern system of ranked Shinto Shrines
