= Dainichi-ji (Tokushima) =

- 大日寺
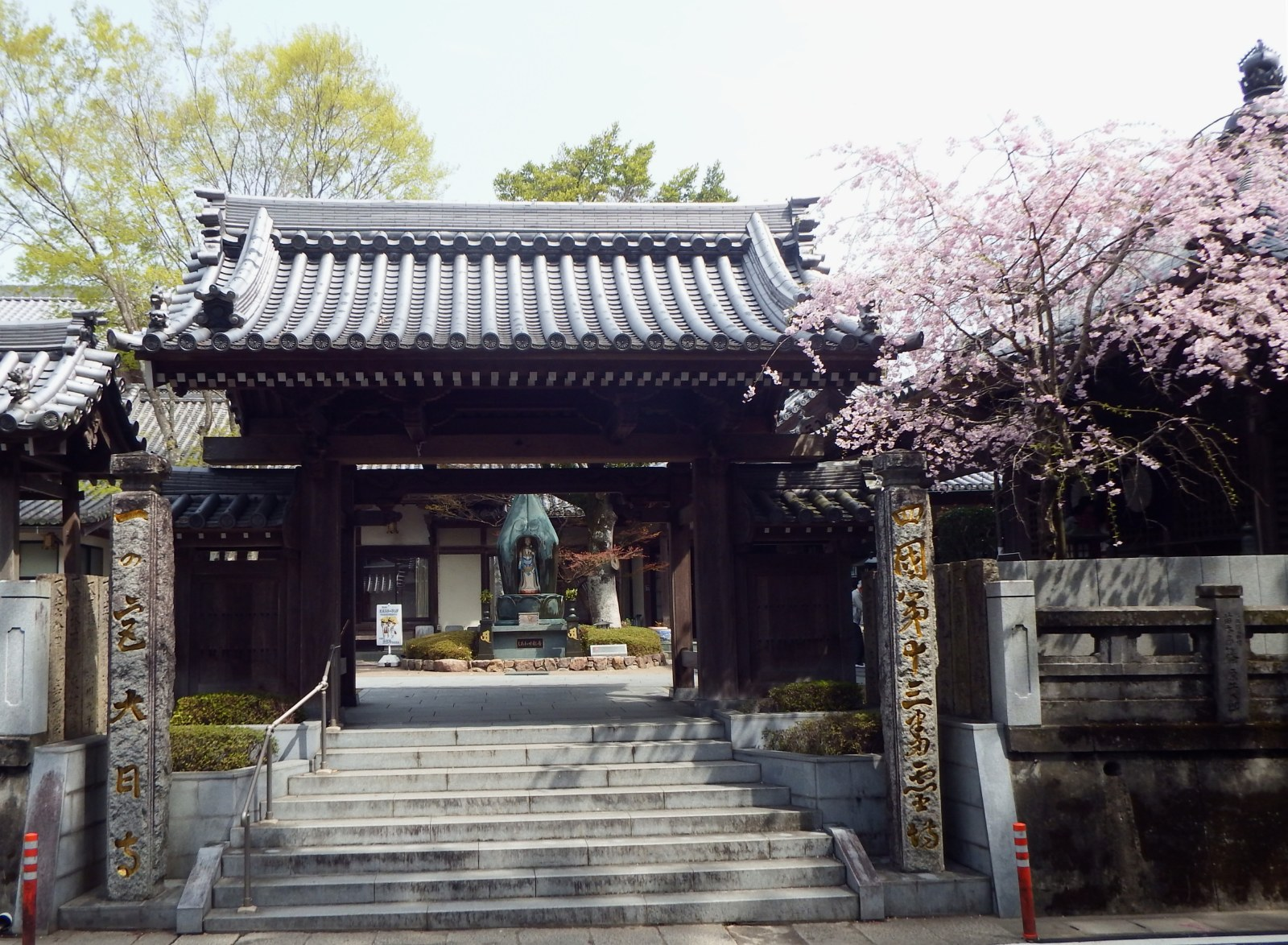

Religion
- Affiliation: Shingon Buddhism Daikakuji
- Deity: Juichimen Kannon

Location
- Location: Tokushima, Tokushima
- Country: Japan
- Interactive map of Dainichi-ji
- Coordinates: 34°2′17.22″N 134°27′45.66″E

Architecture
- Founder: Kukai
- Completed: 815

Dainichi-ji (大日寺) is a Shingon Buddhist temple in Tokushima. It is the 13th temple in the Shikoku Pilgrimage.

== History ==
The temple was said to be founded by Kukai, when Dainichi-nyorai appeared to him in a dream. In the Tenshō era, all the buildings were burnt down by Chosokabe Motochika. During the Meiji era, due to the state policy of shinbutsu bunri, Ichinomiya Shrine and the temple were split. The name of the temple reverted to the original name, Dainichi-ji.
