= Tsubaki Grand Shrine =

Shinto shrine in Suzuka, Mie, Japan

Tsubaki Grand Shrine 椿大神社
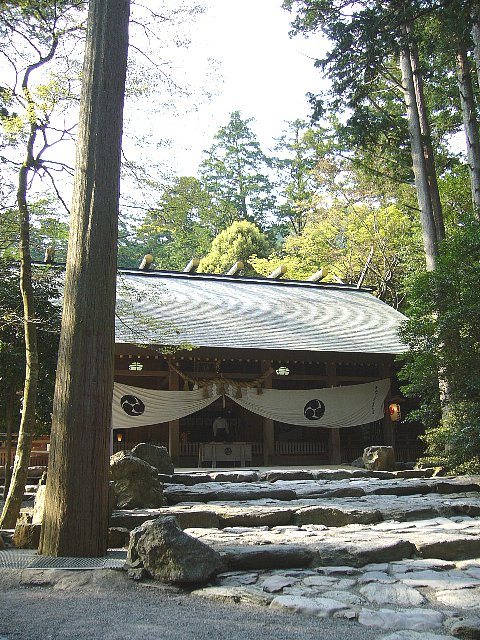
- Haiden of Tsubaki Grand Shrine

- Location within Mie Prefecture Location within Japan

Religion
- Affiliation: Shinto
- Deity: Sarutahiko Ōkami
- Festival: October 11
- Leadership: Yukiyasu Yamamoto

Location
- Location: 1871 Otabi, Yamamoto-chō, Suzuka-shi, Mie-ken 519-0315
- Interactive map of Tsubaki Grand Shrine 椿大神社
- Coordinates: 34°57′52″N 136°27′06″E

Architecture
- Founder: c. Princess Yamato
- Established: c.3 BC

Website
- Official website

Tsubaki Grand Shrine (椿大神社, Tsubaki Okamiyashiro) is a Shinto shrine in the Yamamoto neighborhood of the city of Suzuka in Mie Prefecture, Japan. It is one of the two shrines which claim the title of ichinomiya of former Ise Province. The main festival of the shrine is held annually on October 11.

== Enshrined kami ==
The kami enshrined at Tsubaki Grand Shrine are:

- Sarutahiko Ōkami (猿田彦大神), leader of the kunitsukami and patron of martial arts such as aikido.
- Ninigi-no-Mikoto (瓊々杵尊), grandson of Amaterasu and great-grandfather Emperor Jimmu
- Takuhatachichi-Hime-no-Mikoto (栲幡千々姫命), kami of clothing, weaving, mother of Ninigi
- Ame-no-Uzume-no-Mikoto (天之鈿女命), kami of dawn, mirth, meditation, revelry and the arts; wife of Sarutahiko
- Konohanasakuya-Hime-no-Mikoto (木花咲耶姫命), kami of life; wife of Ninigi
- Gyōman-Daimyōjin (行満大明神), kami of training, study, business; ancestor of the kannushi Yamamoto clan

== History ==
The origins of Tsubaki Grand Shrine are unknown. Although there is no documentary evidence, the shrine's legend states that it was founded in the year 3 BCE during the reign of the legendary Emperor Suinin by the order of Princess Yamato on the site of the grave of Sarutahiko. It first appears in historical documentation in an entry dated 748 in the Daianji garan engi nami rukishizaichō (大安寺伽藍縁起並流記資財帳) records of Daian-ji in Nara. It is listed as a major shrine in the Engishiki records from the early Heian period, and was regarded as the ichinomiya of the province from this time, although this is contested by Tsubaki Jinja, (also in Suzuka), which claims that it is the shrine listed in the Engishiki.

Further according to the shrine's legend, a descendant of Sarutahiko, Gyōman Daimyōjin, was the founder of Shugendō and this the shrine was a center of the Shugendō religion in the Heian and Kamakura periods. The current chief priest claims to be the 97th generation descendant of Gyōman Daimyōjin.

During the Meiji period era of State Shinto, the shrine was rated as a County shrine in 1871 and was promoted to a Prefectural shrine in 1927 under the Modern system of ranked Shinto Shrines In 1935, it was designed as the head shrine for approximately 2000 shrines in the country dedicated to Sarutahiko, although only a small fraction of these shrines actually have any connection to this shrine. One the other hand, the Tsubaki Grand Shrine is the head shrine for shrined dedicated to the "Tsubaki Daimyōjin", which exist all over the country and even overseas, such as the Tsubaki Grand Shrine of America.

As Sarutahiko is revered in aikido, Tsubaki has a martial arts hall for practice, as well as an archery range for the practitioners of kyūdō. There is also a chashitsu (teahouse) called Reishō-an, donated by the founder of Panasonic, Matsushita Konosuke. Behind the main shrine hall is a sacred waterfall, Kinryū Myōjin no Taki, where misogi is practiced.

The shrine is located 45 minutes by bus from Kasado Station on the JR Central Kansai Main Line.

== Gallery ==
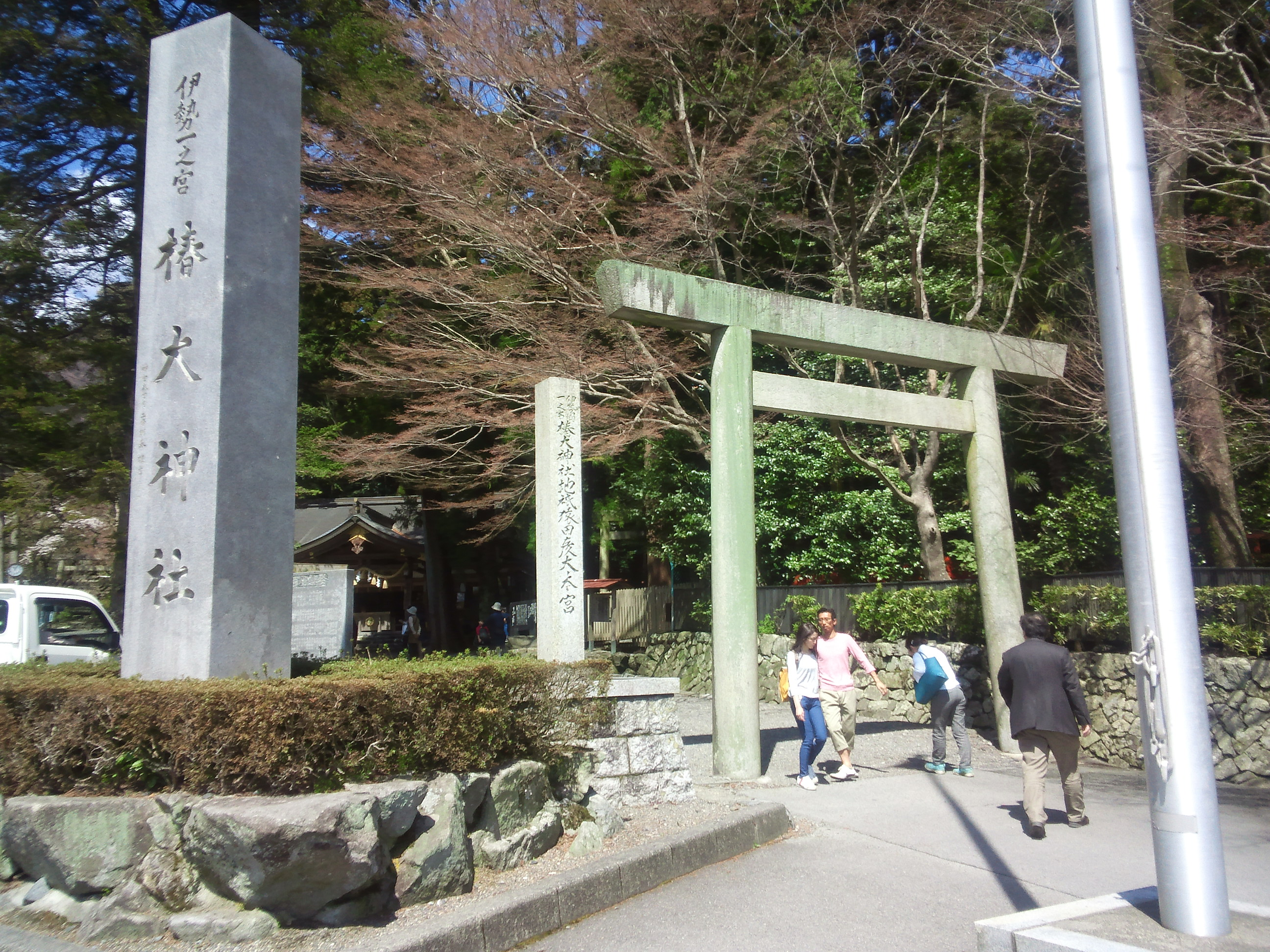
Entry with Torii

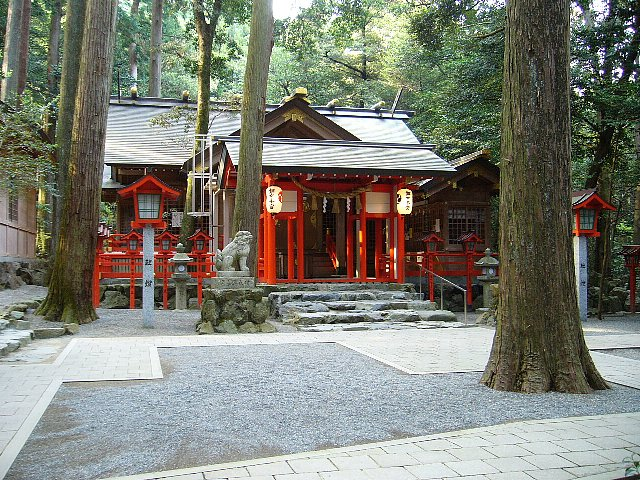
Uzume Hongū

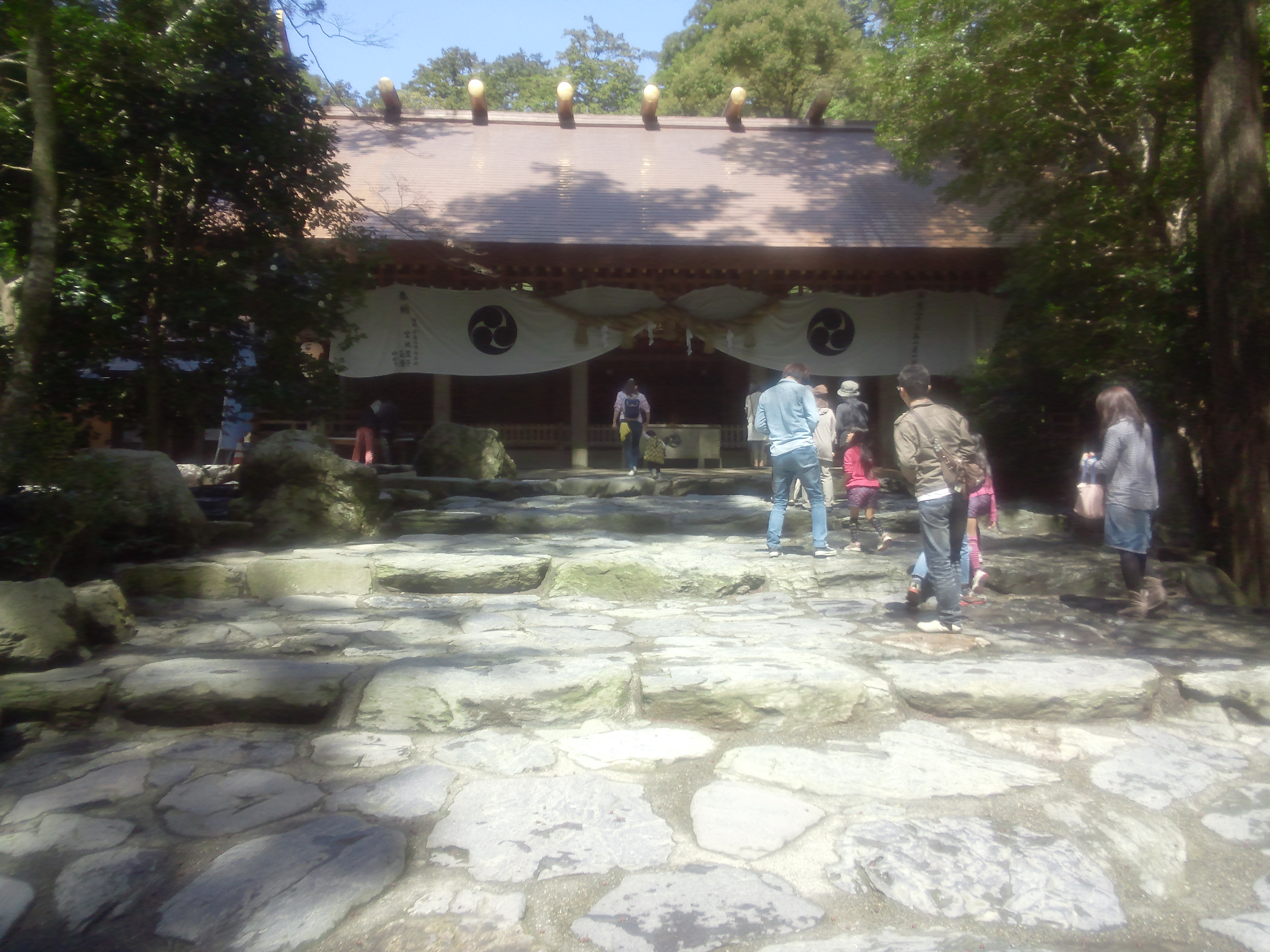
Haiden

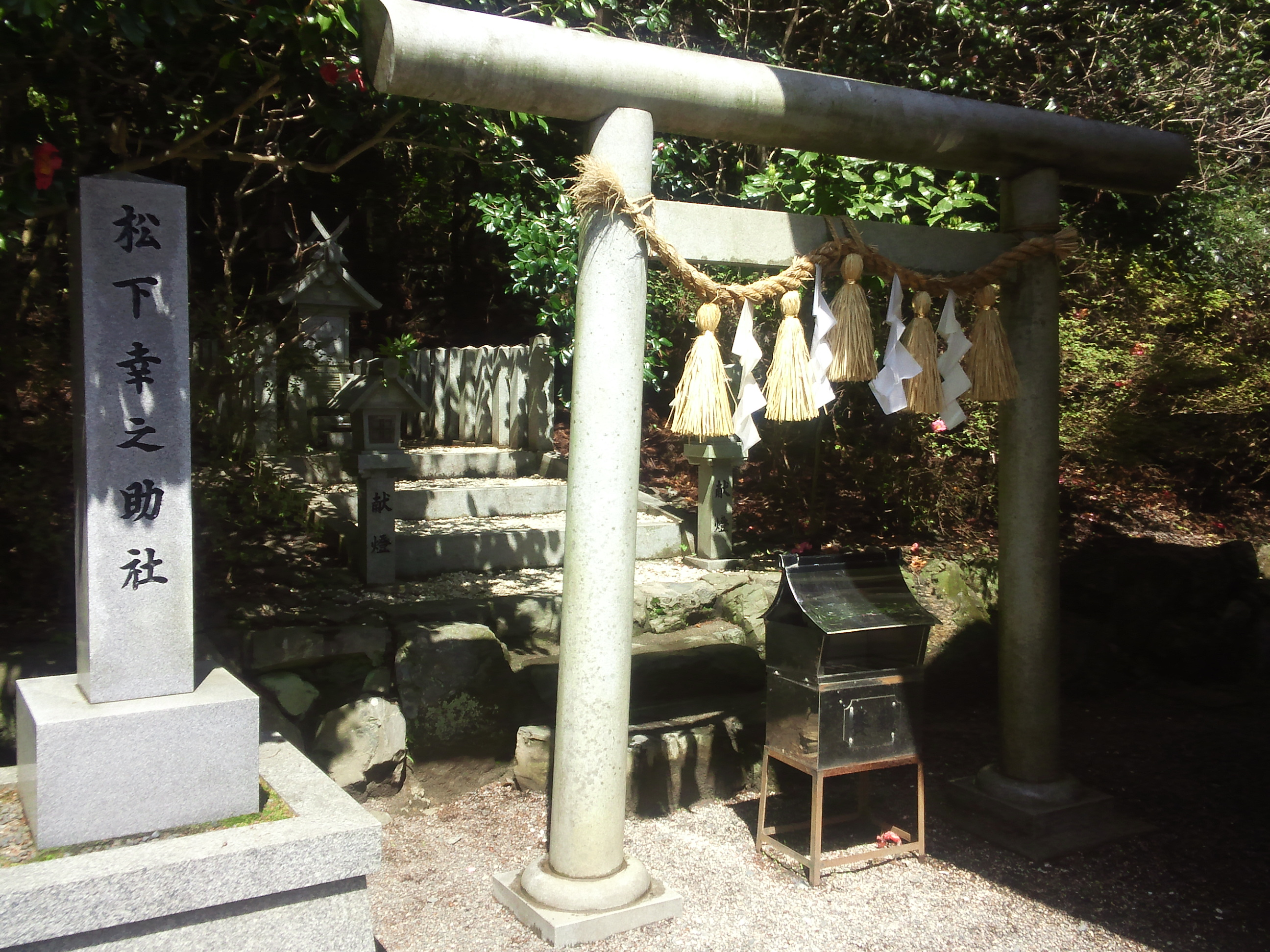
Sub-shrine dedicated to Matsushita Konosuke

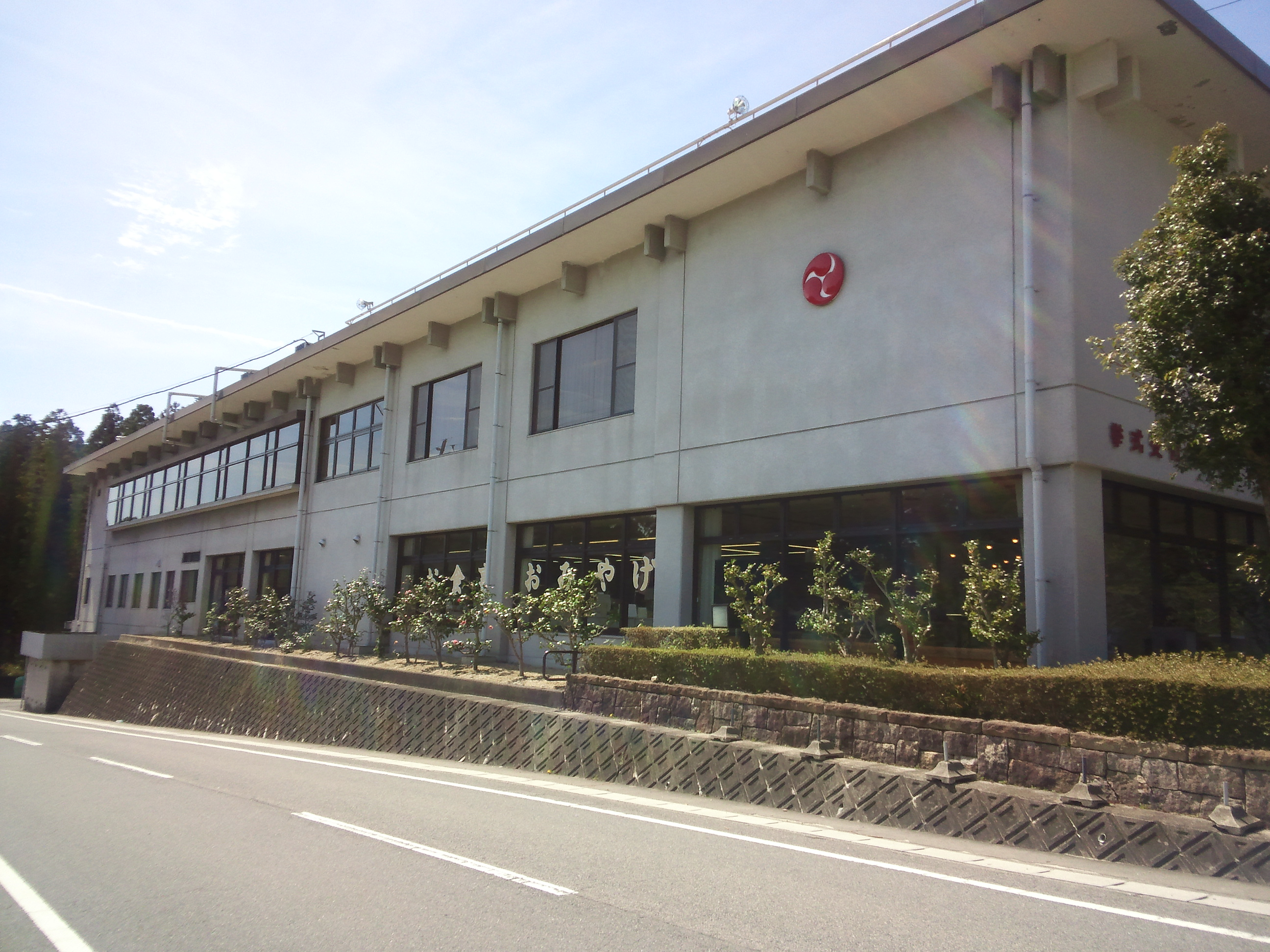
Tsubaki Kaikan martial arts hall

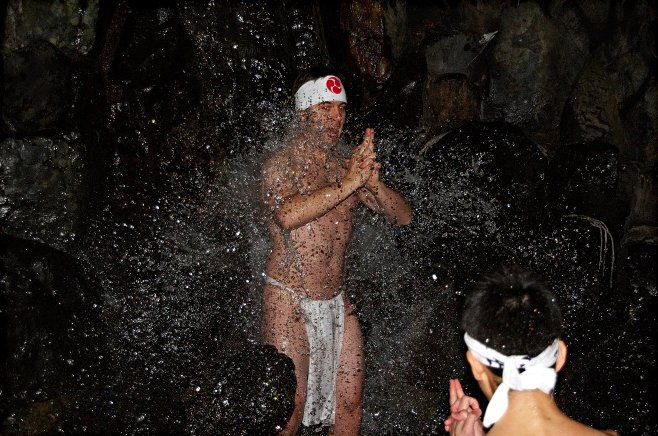
Night misogi under a waterfall at Tsubaki Grand Shrine

== See also ==
- List of Shinto shrines
- Ichinomiya
- Tsubaki Jinja the other Ise Ichinomiya
