= Kō Station (Tokushima) =

Railway station in Tokushima, Japan

B04 Kō Station 府中駅
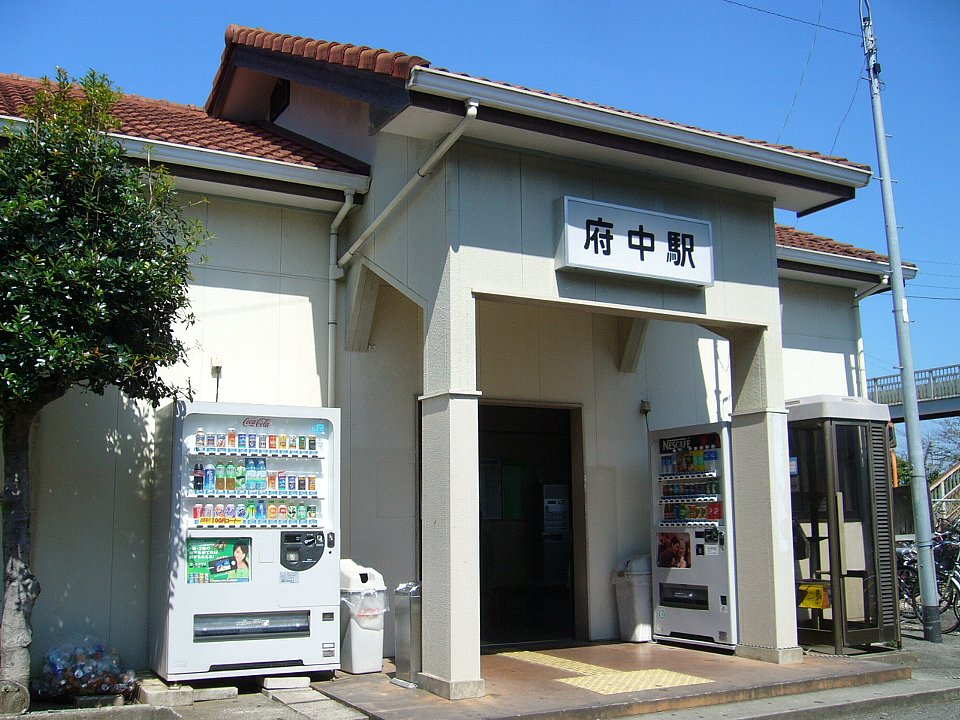
- Kō Station in 2006

General information
- Location: Kokufucho Kou, Tokushima-shi, Tokushima-ken 779-3122; Japan
- Coordinates: 34°04′27″N 134°28′59″E
- Operator: JR Shikoku
- Line: ■ Tokushima Line
- Distance: 62.3 km from Tsukuda
- Platforms: 2 side platforms
- Tracks: 2

Construction
- Structure type: At grade
- Accessible: No - platforms linked by footbridge

Other information
- Status: Unstaffed
- Station code: B04

History
- Opened: 16 February 1899

Passengers
- FY2019: 584
Location
- Location within Tokushima Prefecture Location within Japan

Kō Station (府中駅, Kō-eki) is a passenger railway station located in the city of Tokushima, Tokushima Prefecture, Japan. It is operated by JR Shikoku and has the station number "B04".

== Lines ==
Kō Station is served by the Tokushima Line and is 62.3 km from the beginning of the line at Tsukuda. Only local trains stop at the station.

== Layout ==
The station, which is unstaffed, consists of two opposed side platforms serving two tracks. Track 1 is the through-track while track 2 is a passing loop. The station building has been unstaffed since 2010 and serves only as a waiting room. Access to the opposite platform is by means of a footbridge.

=== Platforms ===
1	■ Tokushima Line	for Anabuki and Awa-Ikeda
2	■ Tokushima Line	for Sako and Tokushima

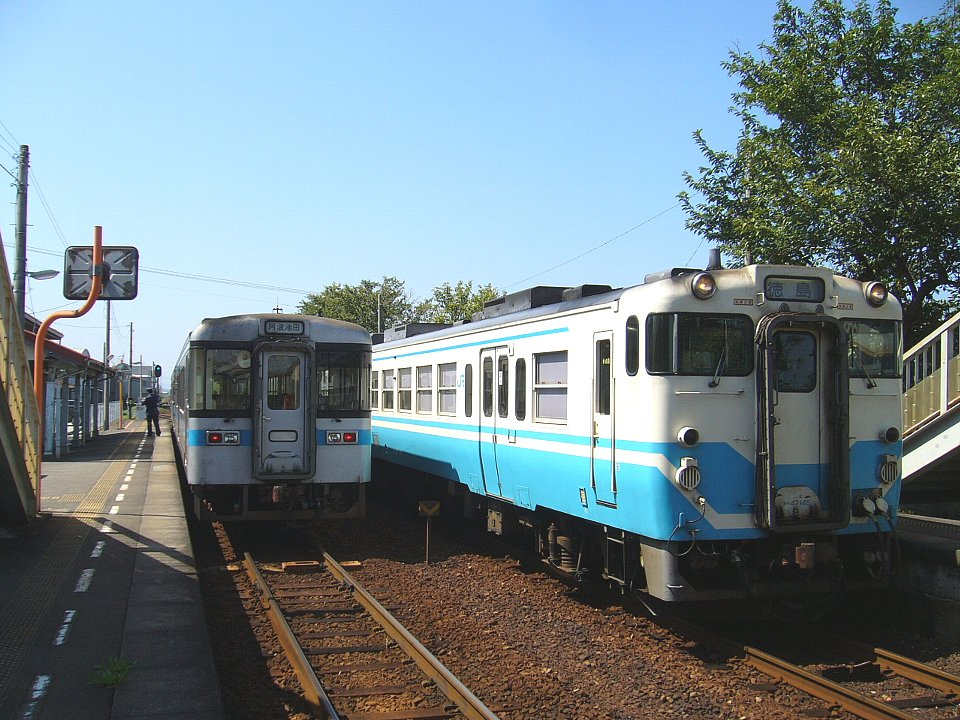
A view of the station platforms

== Adjacent stations ==
«	Service	»
Tokushima Line
Limited Express Tsurugisan: Does not stop at this station
Ishii	Local	Akui

== History ==
The station was opened on 16 February 1899 by the privately run Tokushima Railway as an intermediate station when a line was built between Tokushima and Kamojima. When the company was nationalized on 1 September 1907, Japanese Government Railways (JGR) took over control of the station and operated it as part of the Tokushima Line (later the Tokushima Main Line). With the privatization of Japanese National Railways (JNR), the successor of JGR, on 1 April 1987, the station came under the control of JR Shikoku. On 1 June 1988, the line was renamed the Tokushima Line.

== Passenger statistics ==
In fiscal 2019, the station was used by an average of 584 passengers daily

== Surrounding area ==
Although it is the central station of Kokufu-cho, the road in front of the station is narrow and the villages are cluttered. It is like a station in a residential area.

- Tokushima City Kokufu Junior High School
- Shikoku Pilgrimage 14th Fudasho Jōraku-ji

== See also ==
- List of railway stations in Japan
