= Ōasahiko Shrine =

Shinto shrine in Tokushima Prefecture, Japan

Ōasahiko Shrine 大麻比古神社
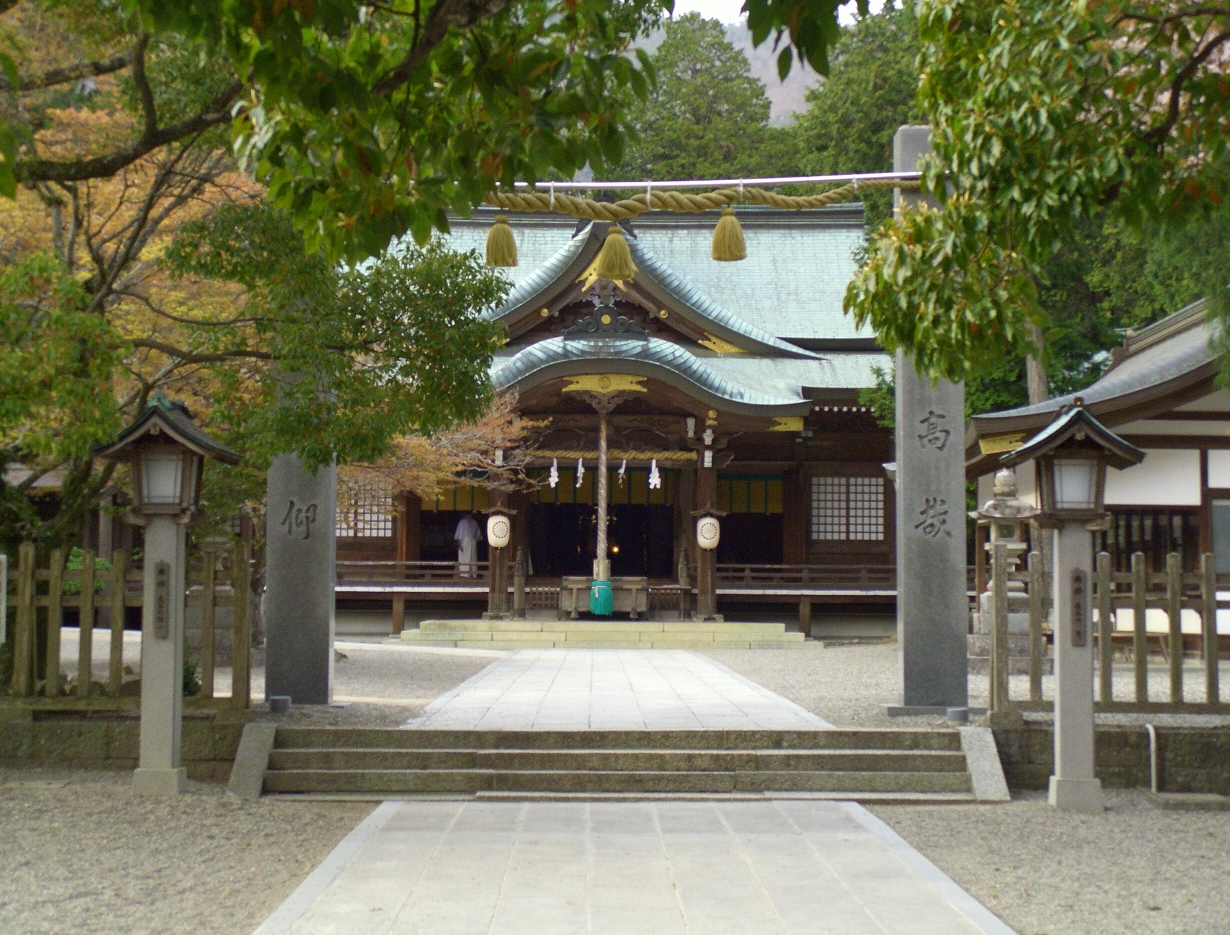
- Ōasahiko Shrine's haiden

- Location within Tokushima Prefecture Location within Japan

Religion
- Affiliation: Shinto
- Deity: Ōasahiko-no-Okami; Sarutahiko-no-Okami
- Festival: November 1

Location
- Location: 13 Aza Hirotsuka, Bando Oasa-cho, Naruto-shi Tokushima-ken 779-0230
- Interactive map of Ōasahiko Shrine 大麻比古神社
- Coordinates: 34°10′15.50″N 134°30′9.25″E

Architecture
- Style: nagare-zukuri
- Established: late Heian period

Website
- Official website

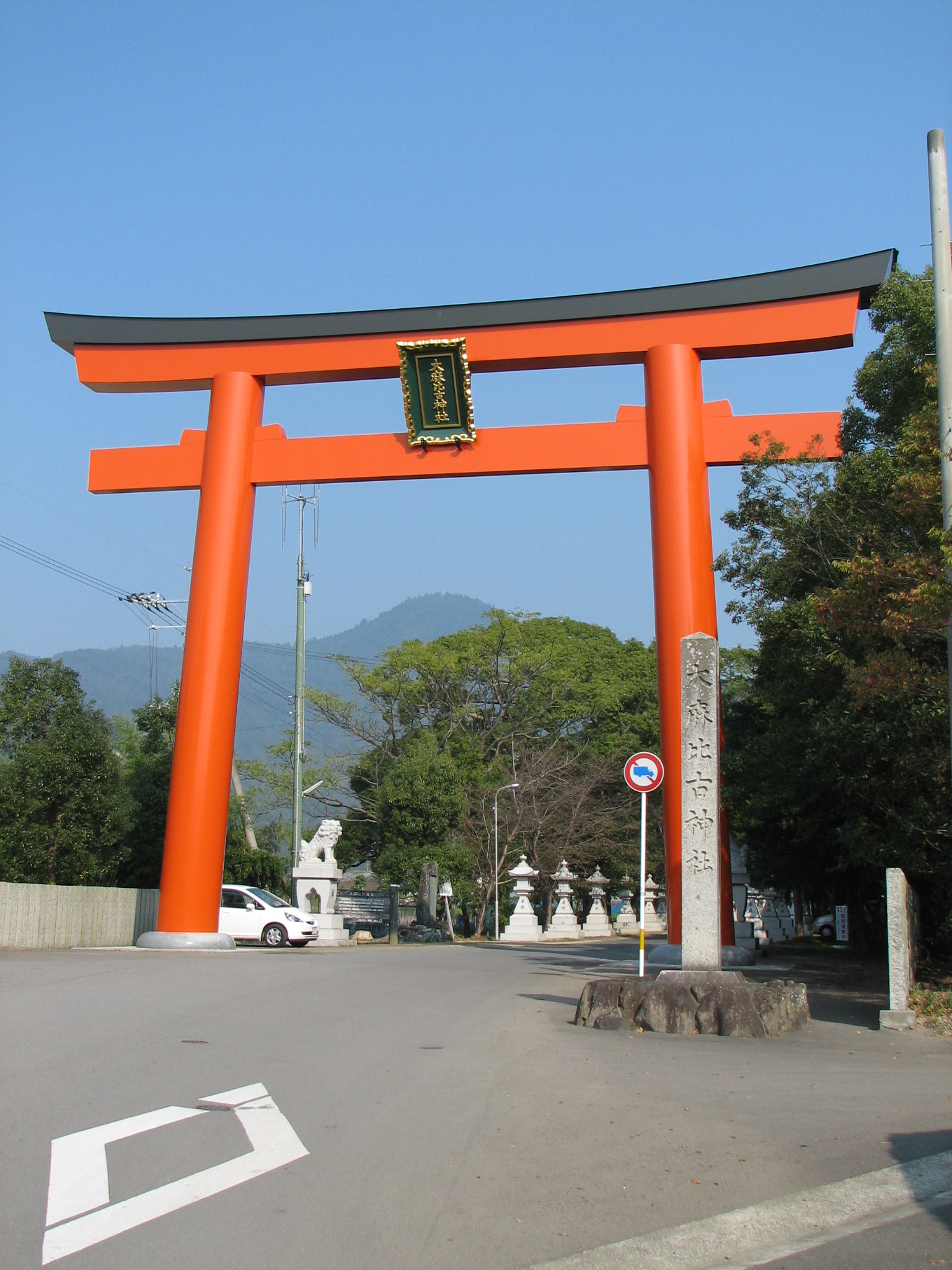
Ōasahiko Shrine's main torii

Ōasahiko Shrine (大麻比古神社, Ōasahiko-jinja) is a Shinto shrine in the Ōasachō-Bandō neighborhood of the city of Naruto, Tokushima Prefecture, Japan. It is one of the shrines claiming the title of ichinomiya of former Awa Province. The main festival of the shrine is held annually on November 1.

== Enshrined kami ==
The kami enshrined at Ōasahiko Jinja are:

- Ōasahiko-no-Okami (大宜都比売命), the goddess of food
- Sarutahiko-no-Ōkami (猿田彦大神)

It is believed that in the era of Emperor Jimmu, Ame-no-Tomi-no-Mikoto came to the Awa region (an ancient region that encompassed most of present-day Tokushima Prefecture) seeking fertilized land to sow hemp seeds. The planted seeds were then cultivated by the area's population so they could produce linen called asa, which formed the base of the area's industry. Because of the impact he had on furthering the welfare of Japan, Ōasahiko Shrine was dedicated in the area to worship him as a kami named Ōasahiko-no-Ōkami.

The secondary kami enshrined at Ōasahiko is Sarutahiko-no-Ōkami. He is depicted as standing at the junction of heaven and earth to guide the grandchildren of Amaterasu, the Imperial Family and the founders of the human race to earth. He is primarily known for greeting and guiding Ninigi-no-Mikoto, grandson of Amaterasu, to earth. After his various achievements, he was enshrined at Ōasahiko Shrine along with Ōasahiko-no-Okami.

== History ==
The exact year of the foundation of Ōasahiko Shrine is unknown. The shrine is listed in the Nihon Sandai Jitsuroku national history which was compiled in 901, in entries dated 867, 878, and 883, noting promotions in its official ranking. In the Engishiki, written in 927, it is listed as a Myojin Taisha (名神大社). During the Heian and Kamakura period, it was designated the ichinomiya of the province. Under the premodern system of shinbutsu-shūgō syncretism between Buddhism and Shinto, it was closely associated with Ryōzen-ji, the first temple in the Shikoku pilgrimage and jingū-ji to the shrine. It was supported in the Muromachi, Sengoku and Edo period by the Hosokawa clan, Miyoshi clan and Hachisuka clan, continued to improve its shrine rating until it was awarded the 1st grade in 1719.

Following the Meiji restoration, the shrine was designated as a National Shrine, 2nd rank (国幣中社, kokuhei-chūsha) in 1871 under State Shinto's Modern system of ranked Shinto Shrines. This qualified it for government support, and it was able to reconstruct most of its buildings in 1890.

After the abolition State Shinto after World War II, the shrine became a Beppyo shrine under the Association of Shinto Shrines, and in 1970, the current Honden, Haiden and the Gaihaiden were rebuilt from the donations of worshipers. Since then, Ōasahiko Shrine has lost most of its national importance, but remains today as an important place of worship in the Tokushima area.

The shrine is 25-minute walk from Bandō Station on the JR Shikoku Kōtoku Line.

== Features ==
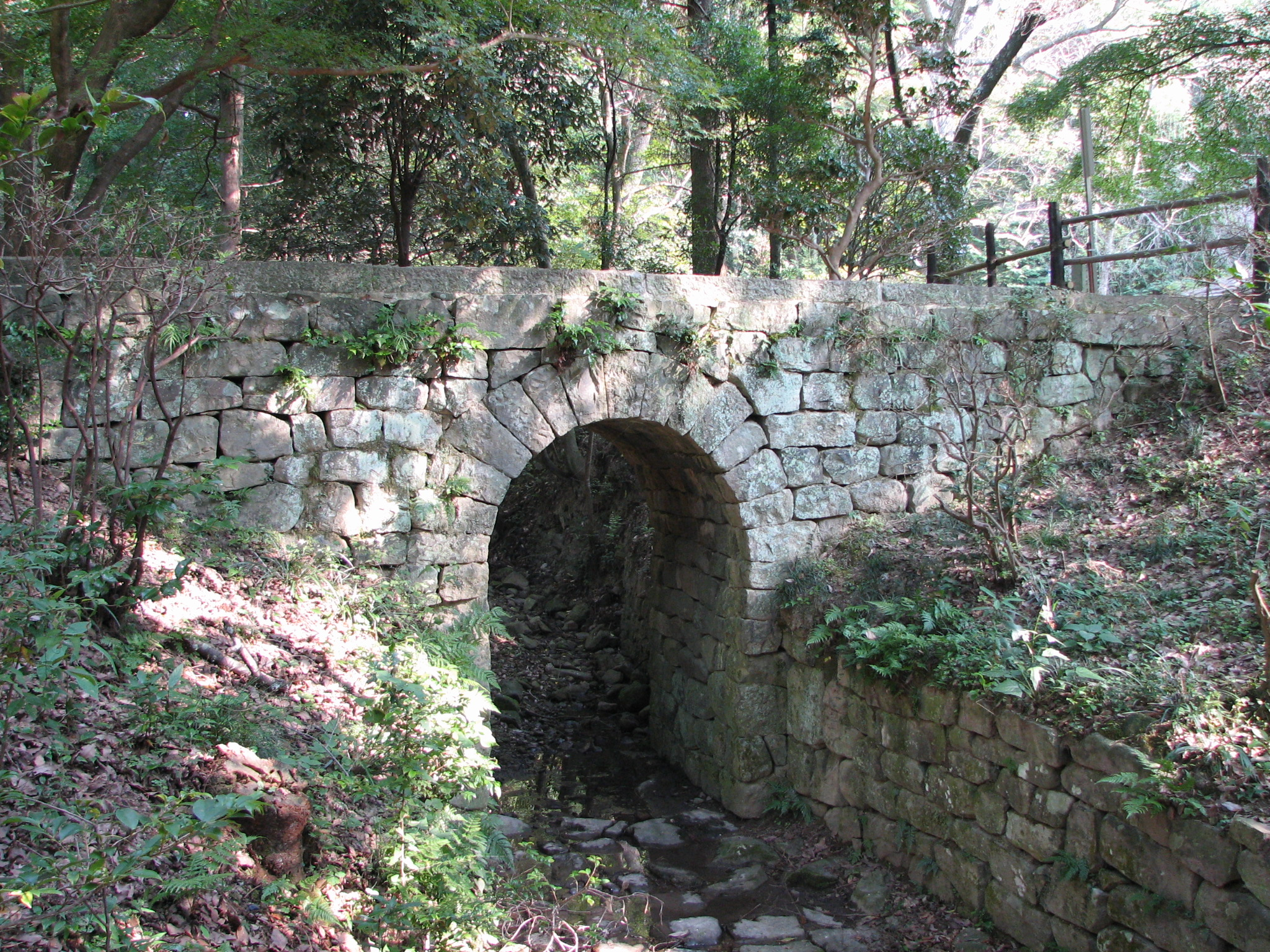
German Bridge

Marking the start of an 800-meter-long (2,600-foot) road leading directly to the shrine's haiden is a large, orange torii. By using reinforced concrete and steel, this torii was first constructed in 1958 and had a height of 15.6 metres (51 ft) and a width of 11 metres (36 ft). Because of its deteriorated state, it was reconstructed in 2002 using metal tubing. The access road which follows is lined with dozens of stone tōrō donated by shrine parishioners in 2004–05.

In the center of the shrine grounds is a 1000-year-old camphor tree known as Go-shinboku (ご神木). This revered tree's main trunk has a circumference of 8.3 metres (27 ft) and a maximum height of 22 metres (72 ft).

Behind the main portion of the shrine grounds to the northeast is the German Bridge (ドイツ橋, Doitsu bashi). From April 1917 to December 1919, about 953 German and Austro-Hungarian soldiers were imprisoned at the nearby Bandō Prisoner of War camp during World War I. This stone bridge was built by the POWs who were held captive at the camp. The bridge is a Historic Site of Tokushima Prefecture.

== Gallery ==
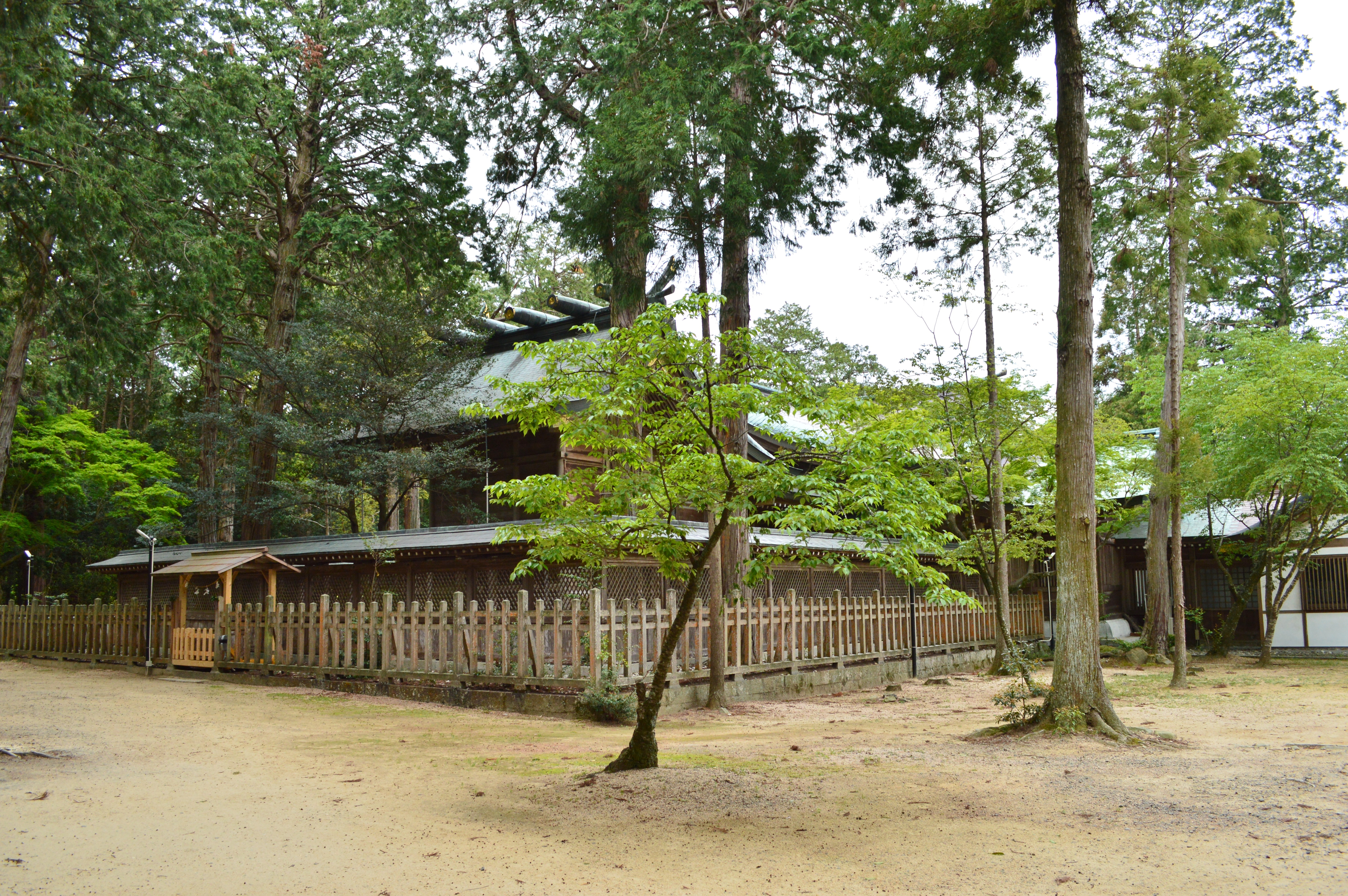
Honden

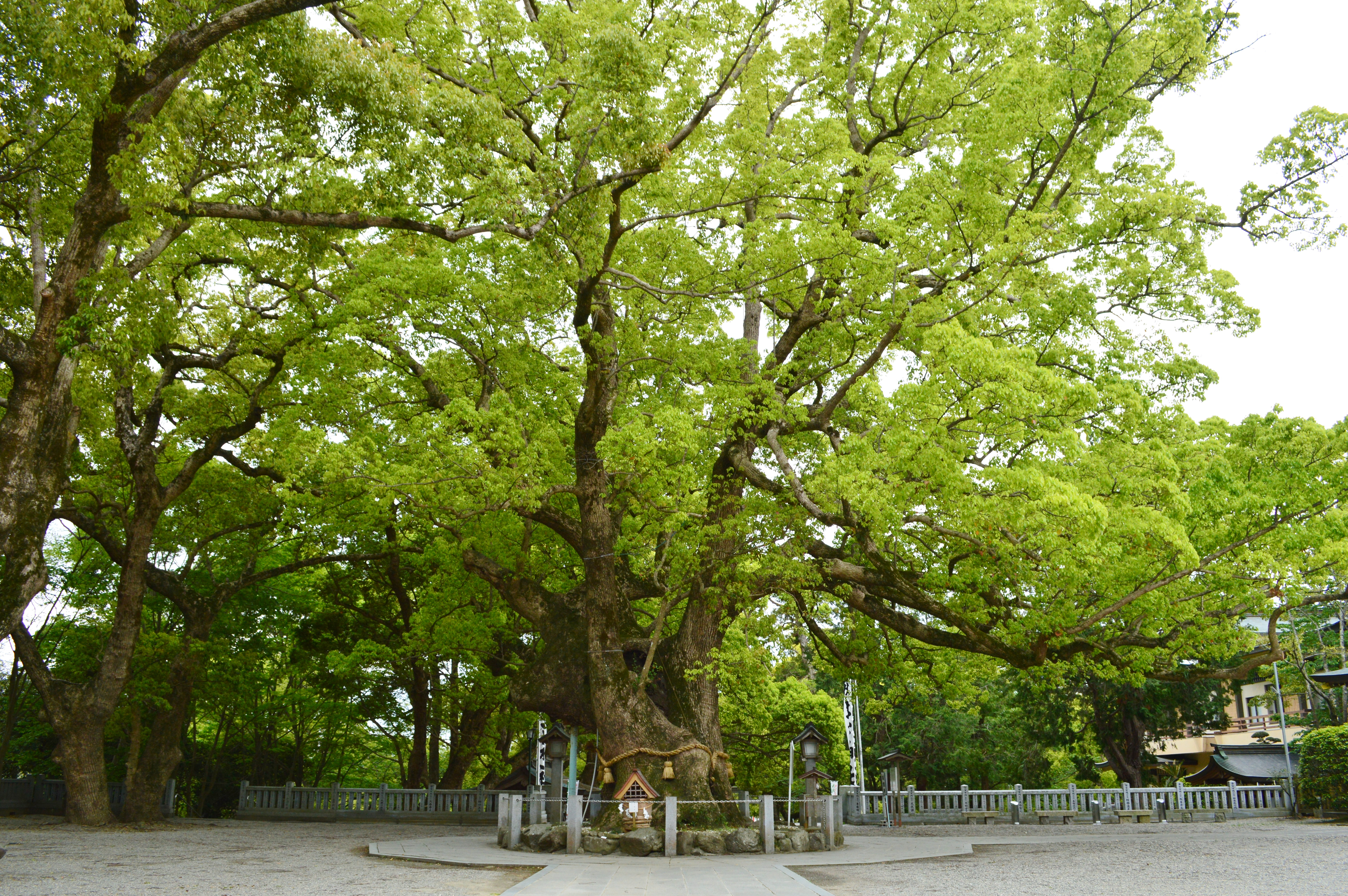
Great camphor tree (Naruto city Natural Monument)

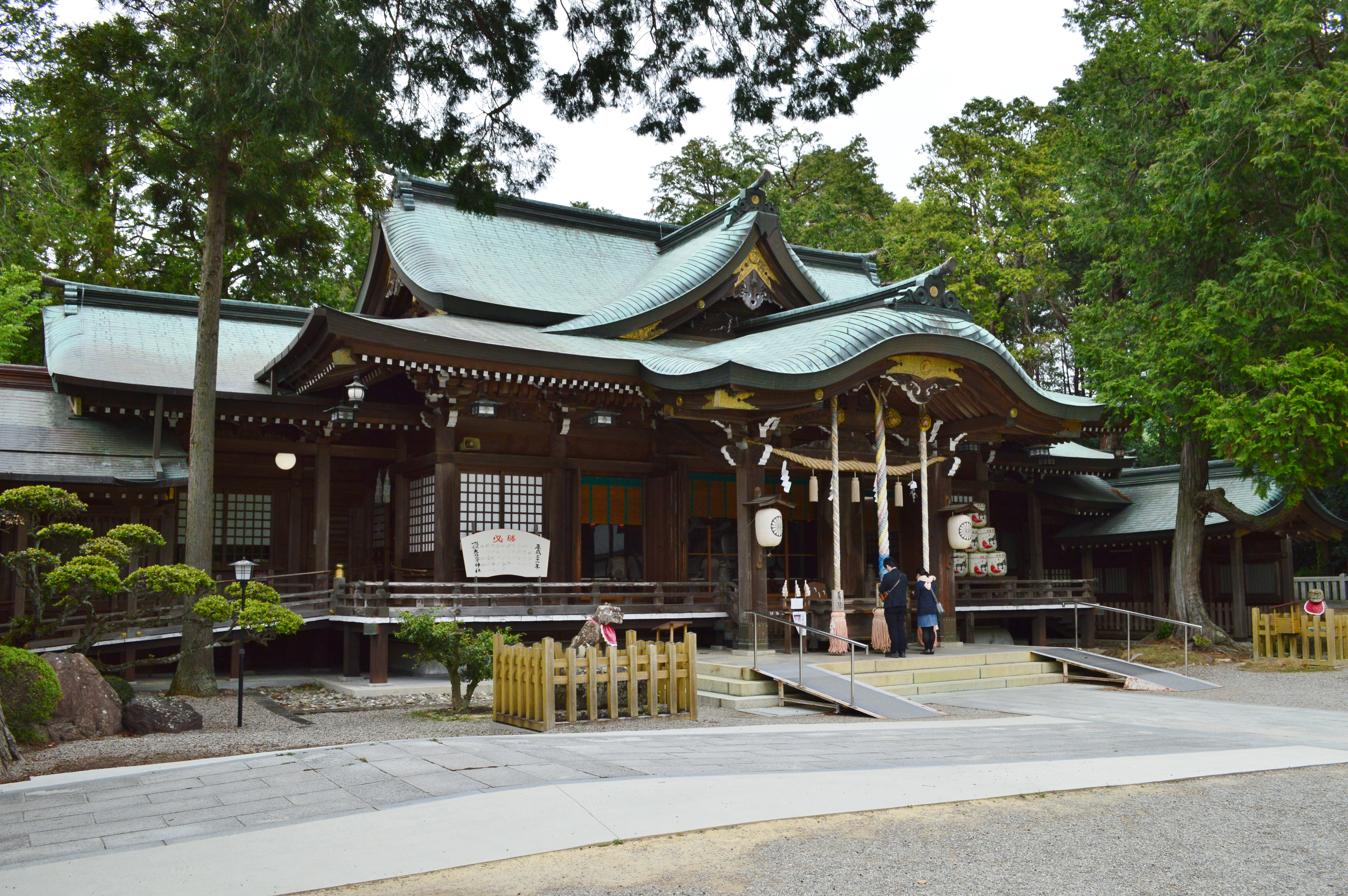
Gaihaiden

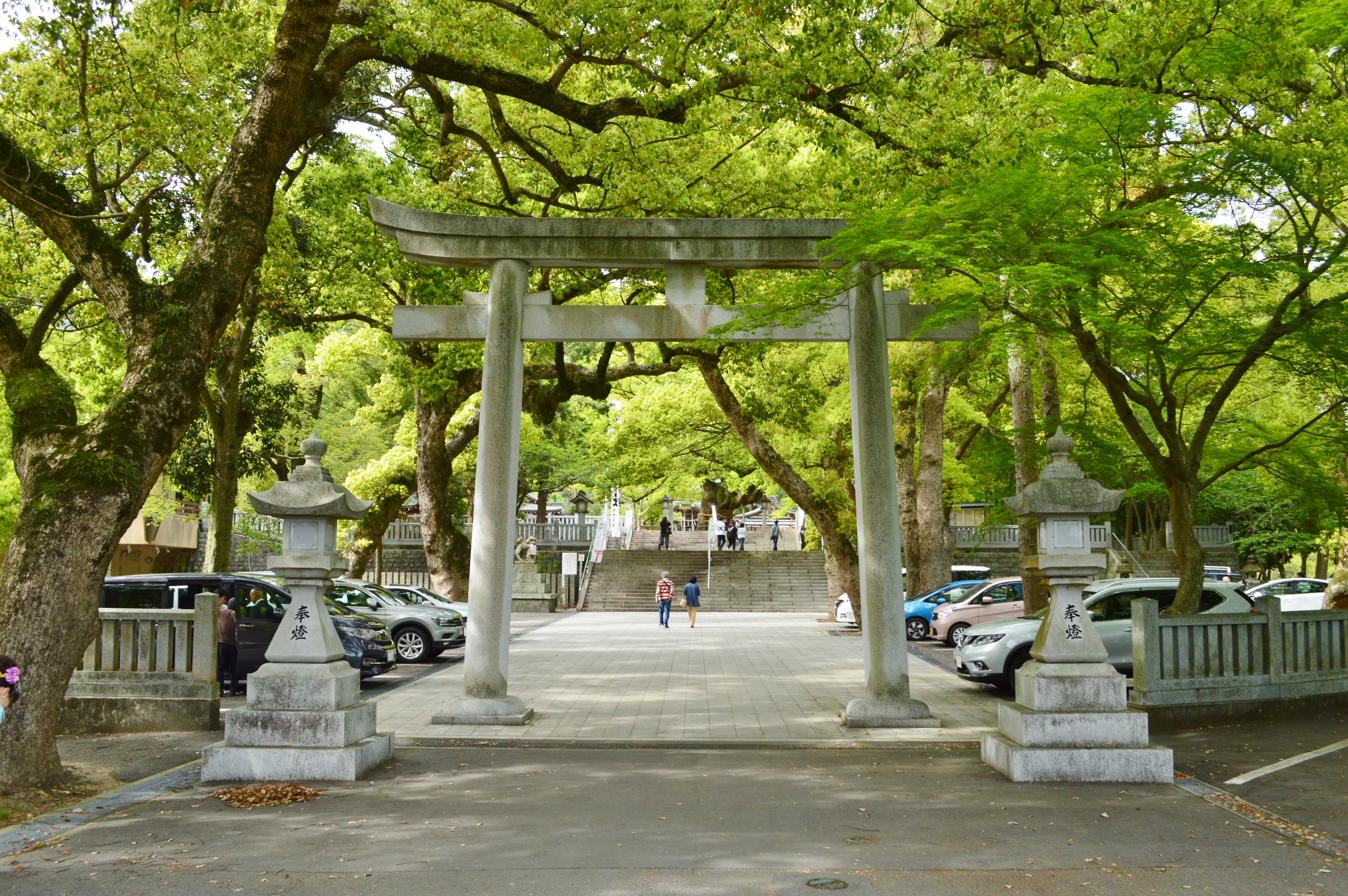
Inner torii

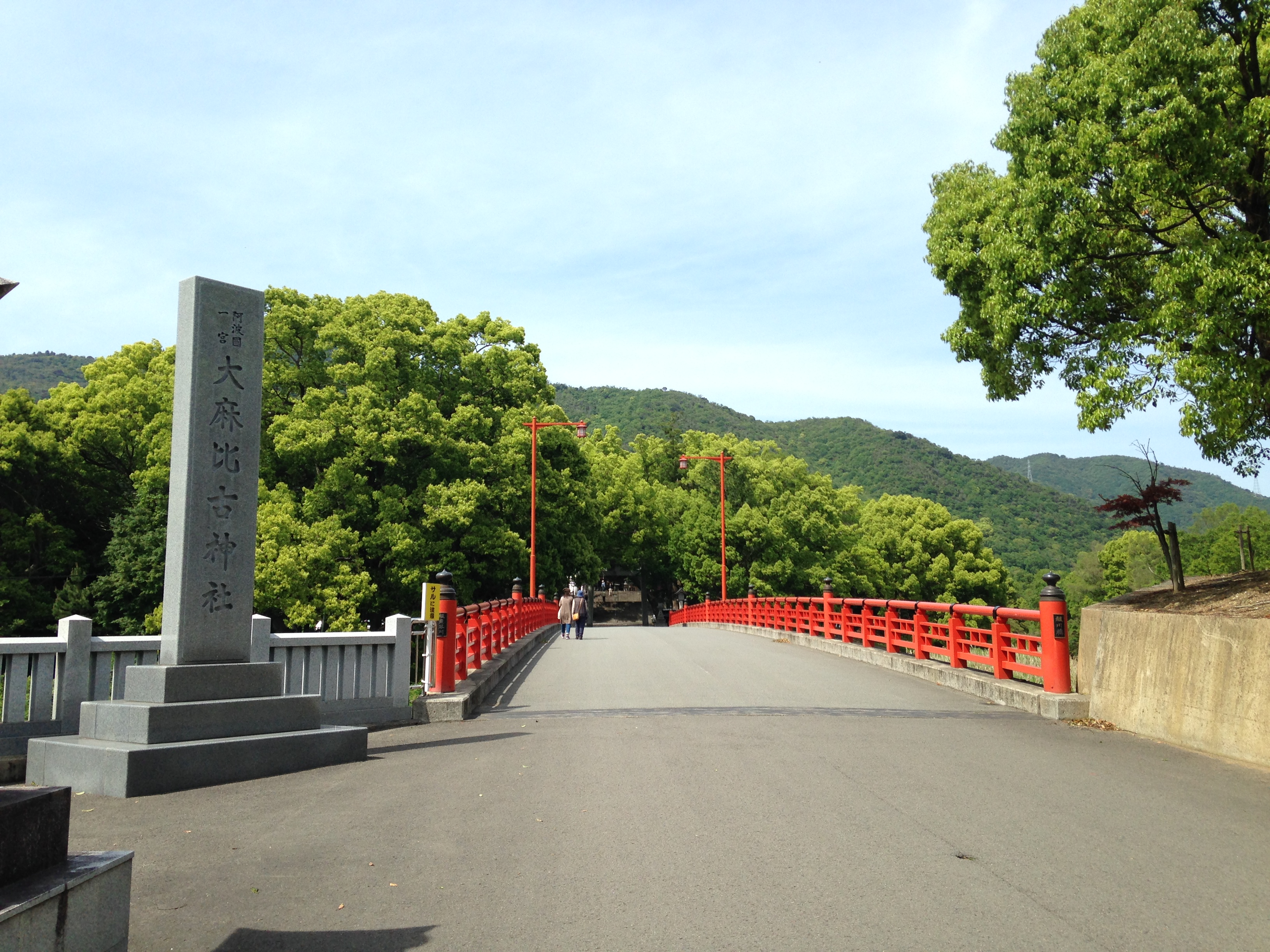
Haraigawabashi Bridge

== See also ==
- List of Shinto shrines
- Ichinomiya
