= Sarutahiko Ōkami =

Deity in Shinto; leader of the earthly kami

Sarutahiko/Sarudahiko/Sarutabiko Ōkami (猿田毘古大神／猿田彦大神; Japanese pronunciation: [sa.ɾɯ.taꜜ.çi̥.ko]) is a deity of the Japanese religion of Shinto; he is the leader of the earthly kami. Norito also mentions him with the title Daimyōjin (大明神, great bright god, or greatly virtuous god) instead of Ōkami (大神, great god). Sarutahiko Ōkami was the head of the kunitsukami and in the Jinnō Shōtōki is said to have been the ancestor of Otanomikoto.

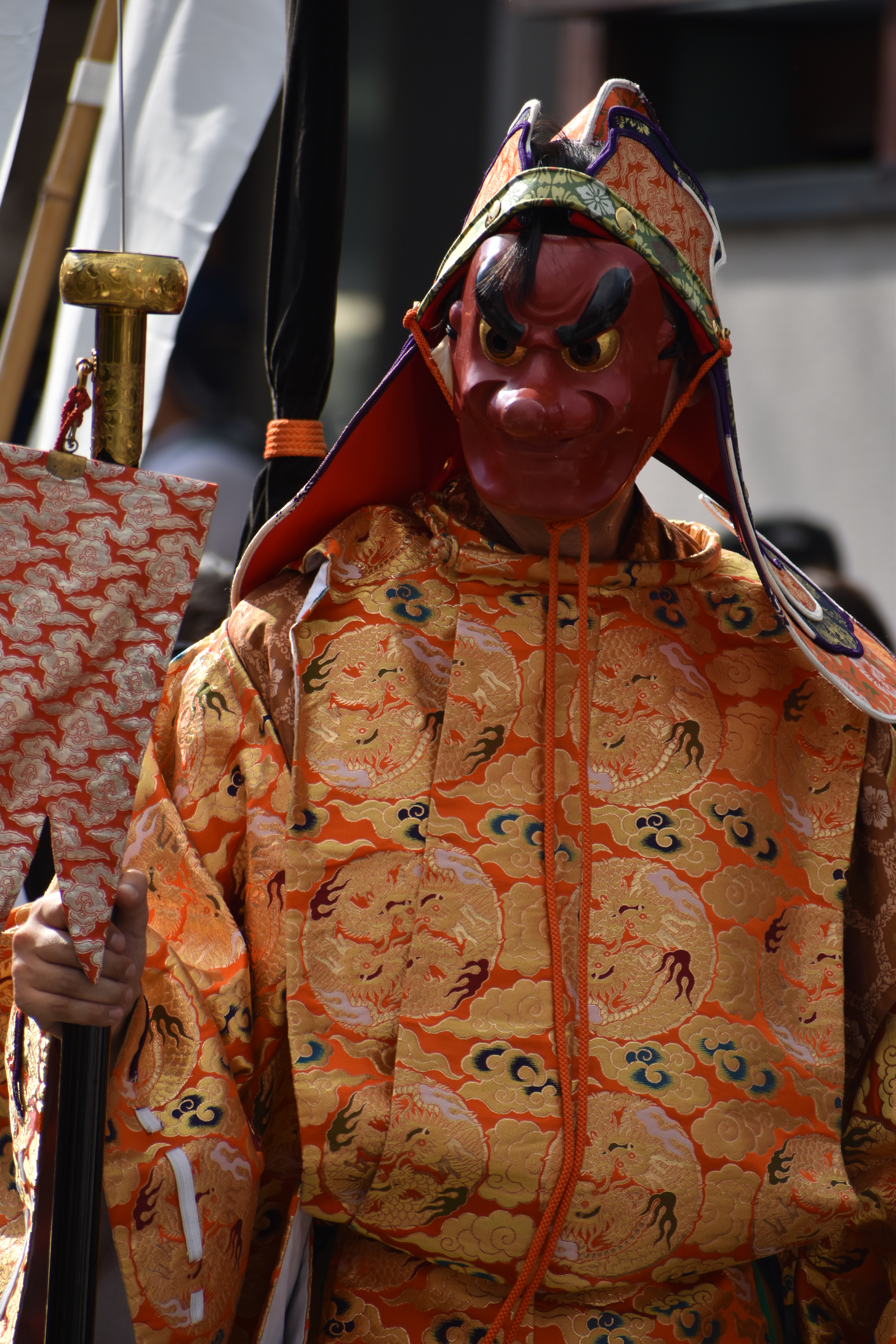
Sarutahiko in the Menkake Gyōretsu parade in Kamakura.

Sarutahiko Ōkami is seen as a symbol of Misogi, strength and guidance, which is why he is the patron of martial arts such as aikido. He is enshrined at Tsubaki Grand Shrine in Mie Prefecture; first among the 2000 shrines of Sarutahiko Ōkami, Sarutahiko Jinja in Ise, Mie; and Ōasahiko Shrine in Tokushima Prefecture, and Sarutahiko Shrine in Mie Prefecture. In the Nihon Shoki, he is the one who meets Ninigi-no-Mikoto, the grandson of Amaterasu, the Sun goddess, when he descends from Takama-ga-hara. He is depicted as a towering man with a large beard, jeweled spear, ruddy face, and long nose. One variant account in the Nihon Shoki gives more precise measurements: his nose was said to measure seven hand-spans in length, his height exceeded seven feet, and his eyes shone red like mirrors, a sight so fearsome that the other heavenly deities were reluctant to confront him, until Ame-no-Uzume-no-Mikoto alone dared to do so. At first he is unwilling to let Ninigi pass until persuaded by Ame-no-Uzume-no-Mikoto, the kami of dance and the arts, whom he later marries. Even Sarutahiko was regarded as the "god who illuminates the sky and the earth" in Ise, and was worshiped by local believers as the sun god (personification of sun) before Amaterasu.

He, Ame-no-Uzume and their children subsequently created the Sarume clan (猿女の君) clan along with an order of female court and religious dancers. It was the origin of Kagura and Noh. Other descendants includes the Ujitoko clan from Ise province. According to Kojiki, he went in Ise where a giant clam trapped his hand on Isuzu river at Azaka, thus he drowned. The Kojiki records that his spirit received three different names corresponding to each stage of his drowning: Sokodokumitama as he sank to the bottom, Tsubutatsumitama as bubbles rose to the surface, and Awasakumitama when the bubbles burst. But strangely, Sarutahiko was considered by Ueshiba Morihei as a kind of god of the cosmic life: the god of Aiki. According to O-Senseï, the practice of Aikidō was practice of Misogi purification itself ("and thus, like Sarutahiko standing of Ame-no-Ukibashi, standing between Heaven and Earth, being one with the Universe, and so achieving peace with the world, the next step being World Peace itself")

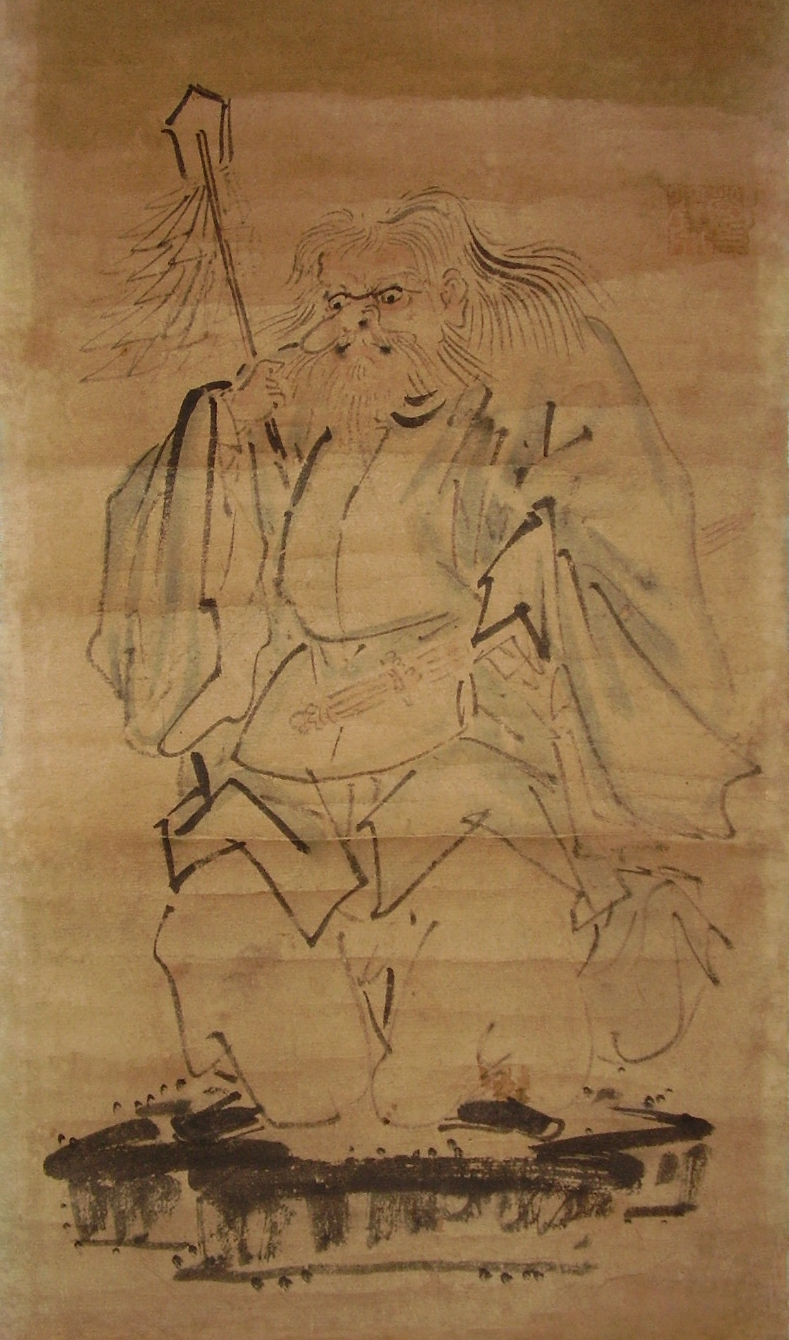
Sarutahiko Ōkami; taken from a late-19th-century Japanese painting.

== Etymology ==

Sarutahiko's name consists of an etymologically obscure element, Saruta, which is traditionally transcribed with kanji that suggest the meaning "monkey-field" as a sort of double entendre, followed by the Classical Japanese noun hiko "a male child of noble blood, a prince." Thus, Sarutahiko Ōkami's embellished name could be roughly translated into English as "Great God, Prince Saruta." Many variant pronunciations of his name exist, including Sarudabiko and Sadahiko. Although it is usually not written, the Japanese genitive case marker, -no, is often suffixed to his name in speech when it is followed immediately by one of his honorific titles, such as Ōkami or Mikoto.

Anthropologist Emiko Ohnuki-Tierney lists three factors that identify Sarutahiko as a monkey deity: saru means "monkey", his features "include red buttocks, which are a prominent characteristic of Japanese macaques", and as macaques gather shellfish at low tide, the Kojiki says his hand got caught in a shell while fishing and "a monkey with one hand caught in a shell is a frequent theme of Japanese folktales".

== Title ==
Sarutahiko has the distinction of being one of only seven kami to be honored with the title Ōkami (Japanese: 大神) or "Great Kami"; the other six are Izanagi, Izanami, Michikaeshi (also known as Yomido ni sayarimasu ōkami (?) who is the kami of the great rock used by Izanagi to obstruct the way to Yomi, and thus, preventing emergence of evil spirits from the Underworld), Sashikuni, Inari, and Amaterasu. Sarutahiko and Inari appear to be the only Ōkami from the kunitsukami, or earthly kami, the others being Amatsukami (heavenly deities). Although there is some other Daimyōjin and Daigongen, most of them appeared later in the History of Japanese Religion, such as Hachiman (deification of Empress Jingu, Emperor Ojin and maybe Takeuchi no Sukune, as a successful head of state) or Hindu deities, the meaning of Daimyōjin appear to be a little different from Ōkami, the latter being obviously more ancient.

== References in music ==
The name of this deity appears incorrectly spelled as "Sarundasico" in Puccini's opera Madama Butterfly.

== See also ==
- Sarutahiko Shrine
- Shirahige Jinja
- Tengu
  - Garuda
- Tsubaki Grand Shrine
