= Gaku Station =

Railway station in Yoshinogawa, Tokushima Prefecture, Japan

B12 Gaku Station 学駅
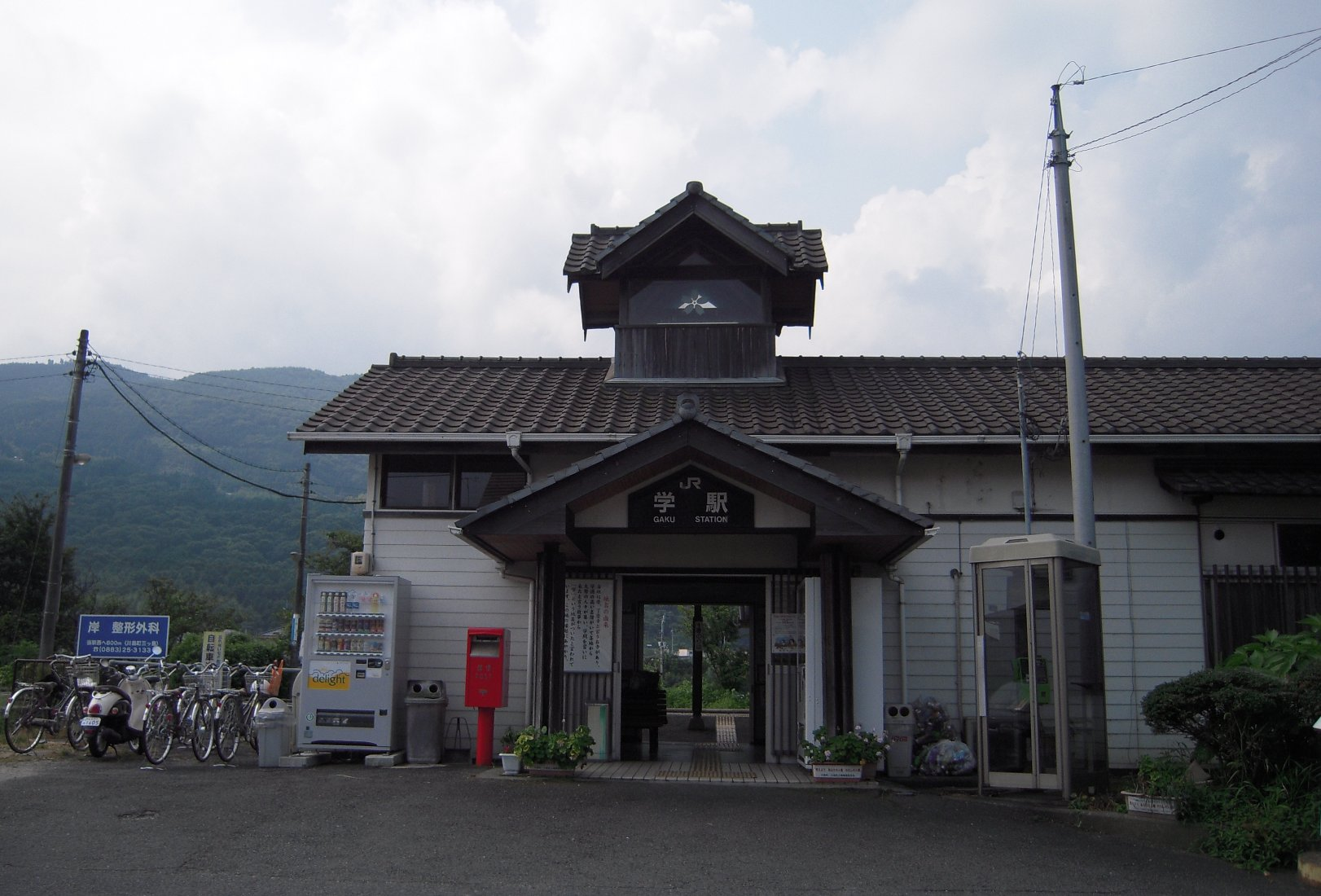
- Gaku Station in 2010

General information
- Location: Kawashimachogaku, Yoshinogawa-shi, Tokushima-ken 779-3306; Japan
- Coordinates: 34°03′27″N 134°17′11″E
- Operator: JR Shikoku
- Line: ■ Tokushima Line
- Distance: 42.7 km from Tsukuda
- Platforms: 2 side platforms
- Tracks: 2 + 1 siding

Construction
- Structure type: At grade
- Accessible: No - platforms linked by footbridge

Other information
- Status: Unstaffed (since 2010)
- Station code: B12

History
- Opened: 23 December 1899

Passengers
- FY2014: 268
Location
- Location within Tokushima Prefecture Location within Japan

Gaku Station (学駅, Gaku-eki) is a passenger railway station located in the city of Yoshinogawa, Tokushima Prefecture, Japan. It is operated by JR Shikoku and has the station number "B12".

== Lines ==
Gaku Station is served by the Tokushima Line and is 42.7 km from the beginning of the line at Tsukuda. Only local trains stop at the station.

== Layout ==
The station consists of two opposed side platforms serving 2 tracks. The station building has been unstaffed since 2010 and serves only as a waiting room. Access to the opposite platform is by means of a footbridge. A siding branches off track 1 and ends near the station building.

=== Platforms ===
1	■ Tokushima Line	for Kamojima and Tokushima
2	■ Tokushima Line	for Anabuki and Awa-Ikeda

== Adjacent stations ==
«	Service	»
Tokushima Line
Limited Express Tsurugisan: Does not stop at this station
Yamase	Local	Awa-Kawashima

== History ==
Gaku Station was opened on 23 December 1899 by the privately-run Tokushima Railway as an intermediate station when the track was extended from Awa-Kawashima to Yamase. When the company was nationalized on 1 September 1907Ţ, Japanese Government Railways (JGR) took over control of the station and operated it as part of the Tokushima Line (later the Tokushima Main Line). With the privatization of Japanese National Railways (JNR), the successor of JGR, on 1 April 1987, the station came under the control of JR Shikoku. On 1 June 1988, the line was renamed the Tokushima Line.

== Passenger statistics ==
In fiscal 2014, the station was used by an average of 268 passengers daily.

== Surrounding area ==
- Yoshino River
- Japan National Route 192

== See also ==
- List of railway stations in Japan
