= Awa-Handa Station =

Railway station in Tsurugi, Tokushima Prefecture, Japan

B19 Awa-Handa Station 阿波半田駅
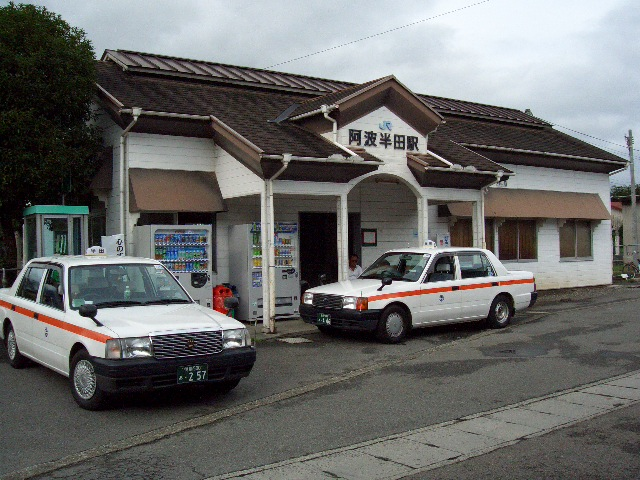
- Awa-Handa Station in September 2006

General information
- Location: Handa, Tsurugi-chō, Mima-gun, Tokushima-ken 779-4100; Japan
- Coordinates: 34°02′27″N 134°02′11″E
- Operator: JR Shikoku
- Line: ■ Tokushima Line
- Distance: 17.2 km from Tsukuda
- Platforms: 1 side platform
- Tracks: 1

Construction
- Structure type: At grade
- Accessible: Yes - ramp to platform

Other information
- Status: Unstaffed
- Station code: B19

History
- Opened: 25 March 1914

Passengers
- FY2014: 88
Location
- Location within Tokushima Prefecture Location within Japan

Awa-Handa Station (阿波半田駅, Awa-Handa-eki) is a passenger railway station located in the Handa neighborhood of the town of Tsurugi, Mima District, Tokushima Prefecture, Japan. It is operated by JR Shikoku and has the station number "B19".

== Lines ==
Awa-Handa Station is served by the Tokushima Line and is 17.2 km from the beginning of the line at Tsukuda. Only local trains stop at the station.

== Layout ==
The station consists of a side platform serving a single track. On the other side of the side platform, the traces of a former track bed can be seen, showing that it was once an island platform but track 1 has now been removed. The station building is unstaffed and serves only as a waiting room. A path and ramp leads to the platform. A shop opposite the station sells some types of tickets as a kan'i itaku agent.

== Adjacent stations ==
«	Service	»
Tokushima Line
Limited Express Tsurugisan: Does not stop at this station
Eguchi	Local	Sadamitsu

== History ==
Awa-Handa Station was opened on 25 March 1914 as one of several intermediate stations built when Japanese Government Railways (JGR) extended the track of the Tokushima Main Line from Awa-Yamakawa to Awa-Ikeda. With the privatization of Japanese National Railways (JNR), the successor to JGR, on 1 April 1987, Awa-Handa came under the control of JR Shikoku. On 1 June 1988, the line was renamed the Tokushima Line.

== Surrounding area ==
- Tsurugi Municipal Handa Hospital
- Yoshino River
- Japan National Route 192

== See also ==
- List of railway stations in Japan
