= Yamase Station =

Railway station in Yoshinogawa, Tokushima Prefecture, Japan

B13 Yamase Station 山瀬駅
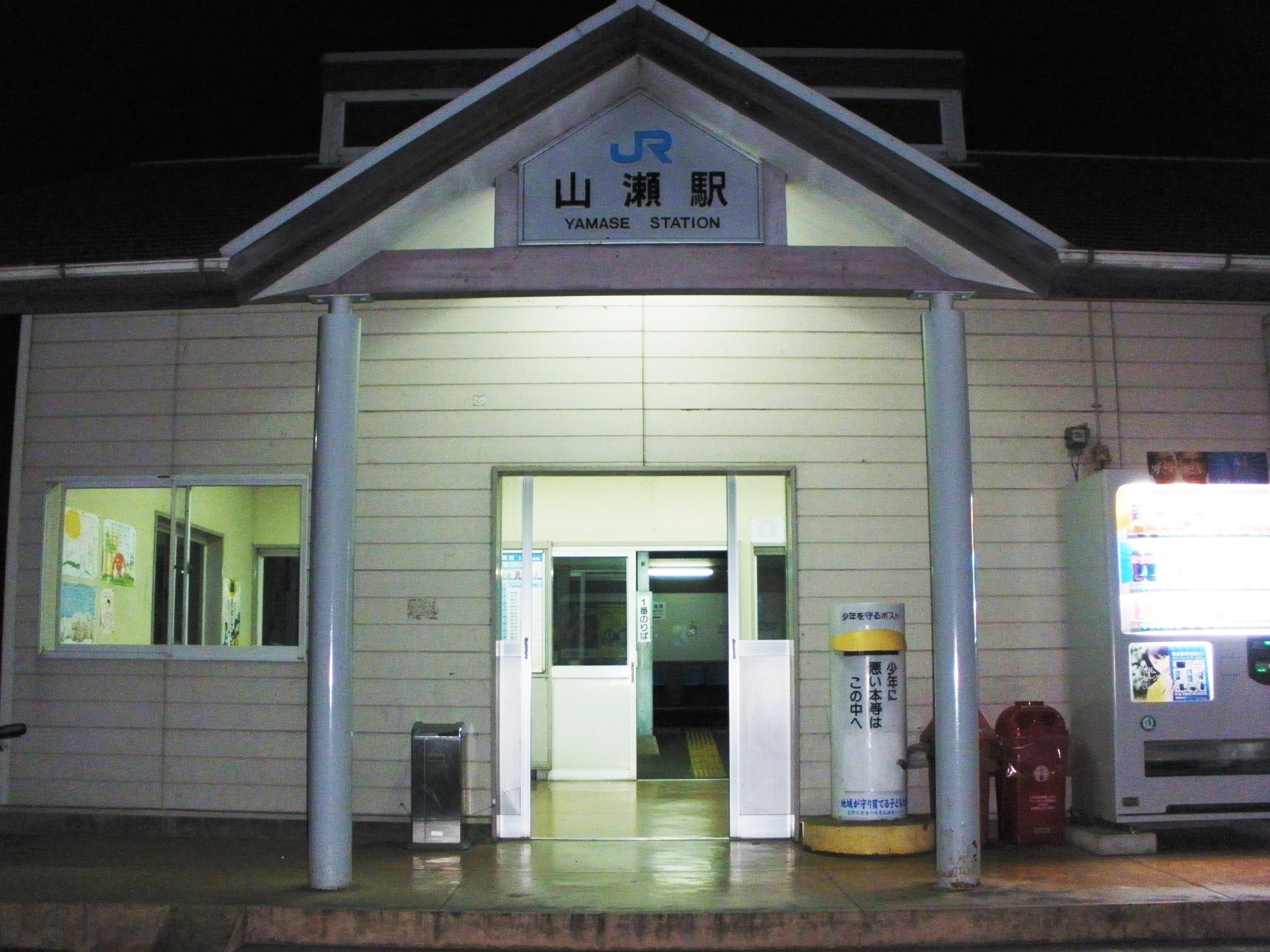
- Yamase Station entrance in 2011

General information
- Location: Yamakawacho Nishikubo, Yoshinogawa-shi, Tokushima-ken 779-3402; Japan
- Coordinates: 34°03′36″N 134°15′23″E
- Operator: JR Shikoku
- Line: ■ Tokushima Line
- Distance: 39.9 km from Tsukuda
- Platforms: 2 side platforms
- Tracks: 2 + 1 siding

Construction
- Structure type: At grade
- Accessible: No - platforms linked by footbridge

Other information
- Status: Unstaffed
- Station code: B13

History
- Opened: 23 December 1899
- Former names: Yamasaki Station (until 25 March 1914)

Passengers
- FY2014: 128
Location
- Location within Tokushima Prefecture Location within Japan

Yamase Station (山瀬駅, Yamase-eki) is a passenger railway station located in the city of Yoshinogawa, Tokushima Prefecture, Japan. It is operated by JR Shikoku and has the station number "B13".

== Lines ==
Yamase Station is served by the Tokushima Line and is 39.9 km from the beginning of the line at Tsukuda. Only local trains stop at the station.

== Layout ==
The station consists of two opposed side platforms serving 2 tracks. The station building is unstaffed and serves only as a waiting room. Access to the opposite platform is by means of a footbridge. A siding branches off track 1 and ends near the station building.

=== Platforms ===
| 1 | ■ Tokushima Line | for Kamojima and Tokushima |
| 2 | ■ Tokushima Line | for Anabuki and Awa-Ikeda |

== Adjacent stations ==
| « | Service | » |
Tokushima Line
Limited Express Tsurigisan: Does not stop at this station
| Awa-Yamakawa | Local | Gaku |

== History ==
The station was opened on 23 December 1899 as Yamasaki Station (山崎駅, Yamasaki-eki) by the privately run Tokushima Railway as terminus of the line after the track had been extended from Awa-Kawashima. It became a through-station on 7 August 1900 when the track was further extended to Awa-Yamakawa. When the company was nationalized on 1 September 1907, Japanese Government Railways (JGR) took over control of the station and operated it as part of the Tokushima Line (later the Tokushima Main Line). On 25 March 1914, the name of the station was changed to Yamase. With the privatization of Japanese National Railways (JNR), the successor of JGR, on 1 April 1987, the station came under the control of JR Shikoku. On 1 June 1988, the line was renamed the Tokushima Line.

== Passenger statistics ==
In fiscal 2014, the station was used by an average of 128 passengers daily.

== Surrounding area ==
The area around the station is the center of former Yamase Town

- Japan National Route 192
- Yoshinogawa City Yamase Elementary School

== See also ==
- List of railway stations in Japan
