= Ushinoshima Station =

Railway station in Yoshinogawa, Tokushima Prefecture, Japan

Coordinates: 34°04′35″N 134°23′50″E

B07 Ushinoshima Station 牛島駅
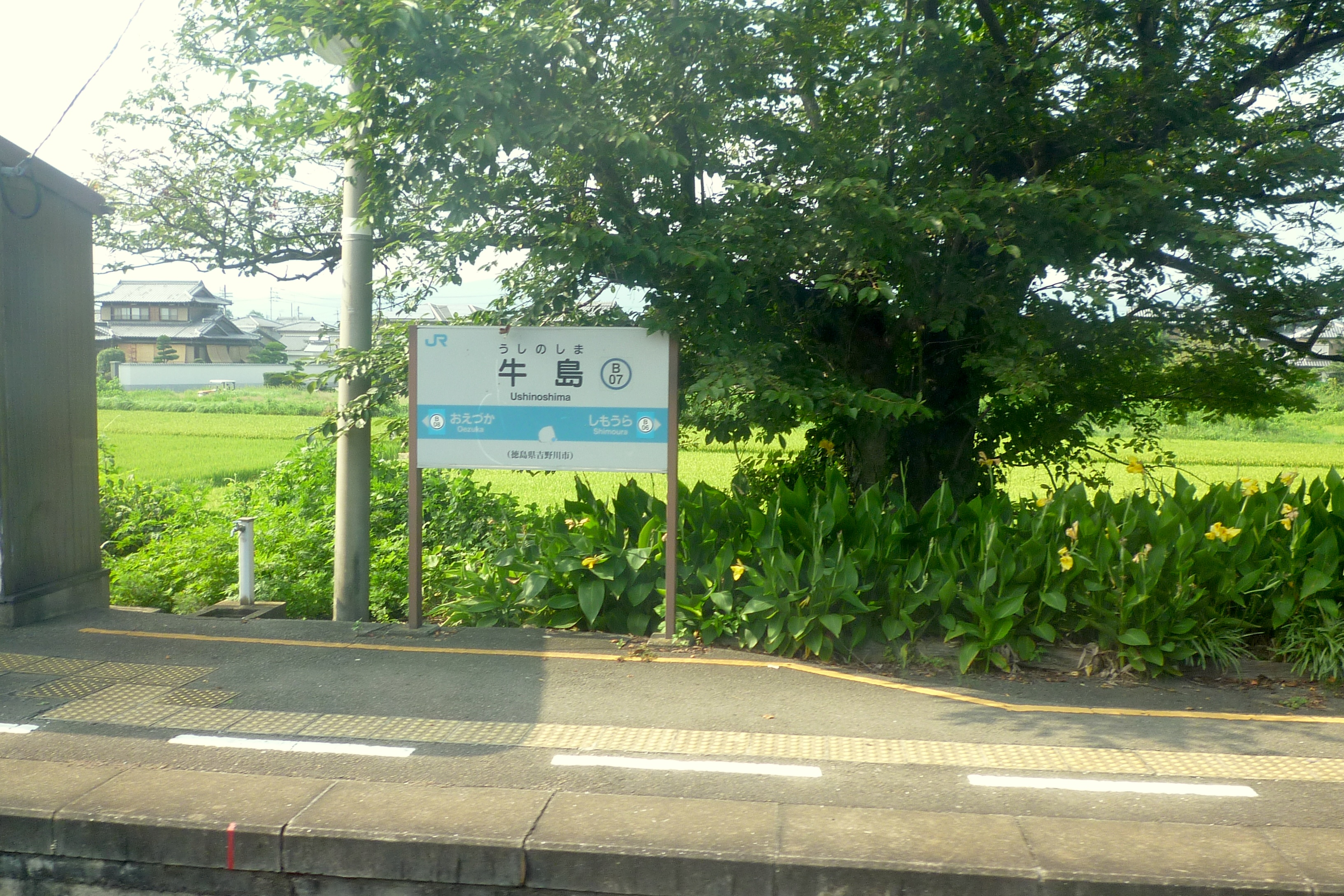
- Platform of Ushinoshima Station in 2009

General information
- Location: Kamojimacho Ushishima, Yoshinogawa-shi, Tokushima-ken 776-0001; Japan
- Operator: JR Shikoku
- Line: ■ Tokushima Line
- Distance: 53.8 km from Tsukuda
- Platforms: 2 side platforms
- Tracks: 2

Construction
- Structure type: At grade
- Accessible: No - platforms linked by footbridge

Other information
- Status: Unstaffed
- Station code: B07

History
- Opened: 16 February 1899

Passengers
- FY2014: 267
Location
- Location within Tokushima Prefecture Location within Japan

Ushinoshima Station (牛島駅, Ushinoshima-eki) is a passenger railway station located in the city of Yoshinogawa, Tokushima Prefecture, Japan. It is operated by JR Shikoku and has the station number "B07".

== Lines ==
Ushinoshima Station is served by the Tokushima Line and is 53.8 km from the beginning of the line at Tsukuda. Only local trains stop at the station.

== Layout ==
The station consists of two opposed side platforms serving two track. The station building is unstaffed and serves only as a waiting room. Access to the opposite platform is by means of a footbridge.

=== Platforms ===
1	■ Tokushima Line	for Anabuki and Awa-Ikeda
2	■ Tokushima Line	for Sako and Tokushima

== Adjacent stations ==
«	Service	»
Tokushima Line
Limited Express Tsurugisan: Does not stop at this station
Oezuka	Local	Shimoura

== History ==
Ushinoshima Station was opened on 16 February 1899 by the privately run Tokushima Railway as an intermediate station when a line was built between Tokushima and Kamojima. When the company was nationalized on 1 September 1907, Japanese Government Railways (JGR) took over control of the station and operated it as part of the Tokushima Line (later the Tokushima Main Line). With the privatization of Japanese National Railways (JNR), the successor of JGR, on 1 April 1987, the station came under the control of JR Shikoku. On 1 June 1988, the line was renamed the Tokushima Line.

== Passenger statistics ==
In fiscal 2014, the station was used by an average of 267 passengers daily.

== Surrounding area ==
- Japan National Route 192

== See also ==
- List of railway stations in Japan
