= Tsuji Station =

Railway station in Miyoshi, Tokushima Prefecture, Japan

B23 Tsuji Station 辻駅
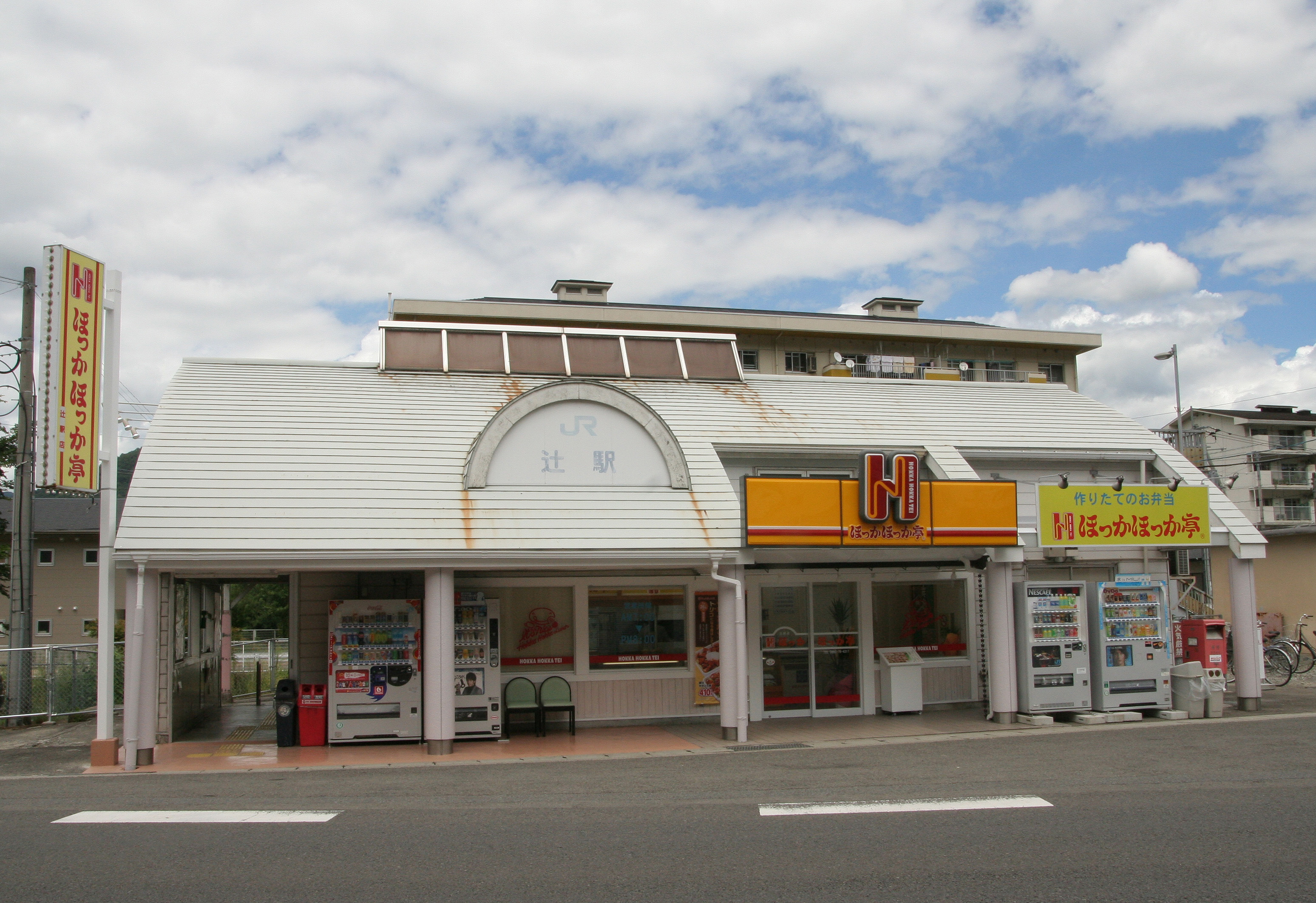
- Tsuji Station in 2008

General information
- Location: Ikawacho Goryoden, Miyoshi, Tokushima-ken 779-4802; Japan
- Coordinates: 34°01′44″N 133°52′26″E
- Operator: JR Shikoku
- Line: ■ Tokushima Line
- Distance: 1.5 km from Tsukuda
- Platforms: 1 island platform
- Tracks: 2 + 1 siding

Construction
- Structure type: At grade
- Accessible: No - island platform accessed by footbridge

Other information
- Status: Unstaffed
- Station code: B23

History
- Opened: 25 March 1914

Passengers
- FY2019: 185
Location
- Location within Tokushima Prefecture Location within Japan

Tsuji Station (辻駅, Tsuji-eki) is a passenger railway station located in the city of Miyoshi, Tokushima Prefecture, Japan. It is operated by JR Shikoku and has the station number "B23".

== Lines ==
Tsuji Station is served by the Tokushima Line and is 1.5 km from the beginning of the line at Tsukuda. Only local trains stop at the station.

== Layout ==
The station consists of an island platform serving two tracks. A siding branches track 1. The station building is unstaffed and serves only as a waiting room. Access to the island platform is by means of a footbridge.

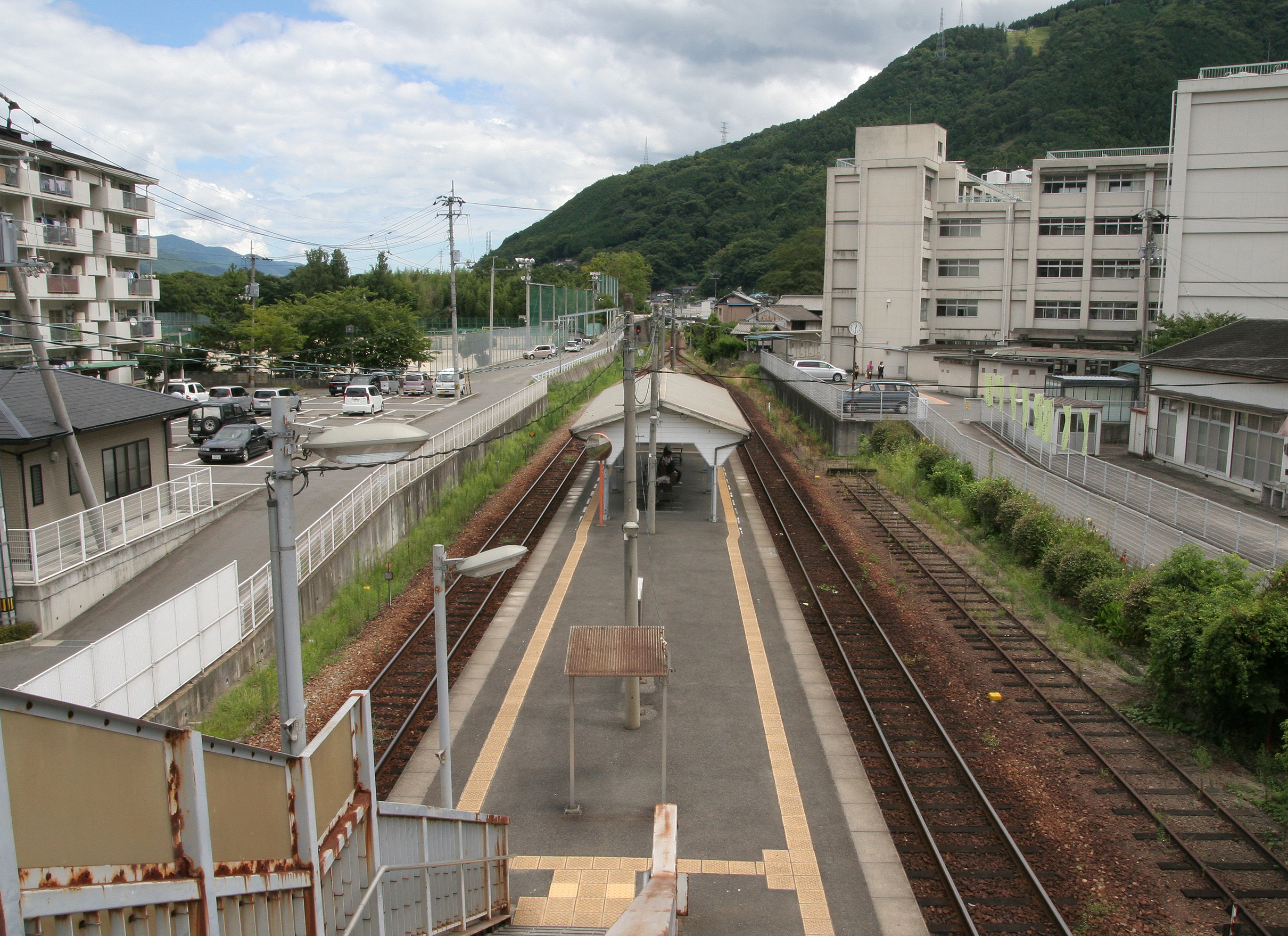
A view of the station platforms and tracks. The siding can be seen to the right.

== Adjacent stations ==
«	Service	»
Tokushima Line
Limited Express Tsurugisan: Does not stop at this station
Tsukuda	Local	Awa-Kamo

== History ==
Tsuji Station was opened on 25 March 1914 as one of several intermediate stations built when Japanese Government Railways (JGR) extended the track of the Tokushima Main Line from Awa-Yamakawa to Awa-Ikeda. With the privatization of Japanese National Railways (JNR), the successor to JGR, on 1 April 1987, Tsuji came under the control of JR Shikoku. On 1 June 1988, the line was renamed the Tokushima Line.

== Passenger statistics ==
In fiscal 2019, the station was used by an average of 185 passengers daily

== Surrounding area ==
- Tokushima Prefectural Ikeda High School Tsuji School
- Yoshino River
- Japan National Route 192
- Miyoshi City Hall Igawa Branch office
- Miyoshi City Ikawa Junior High School

== See also ==
- List of railway stations in Japan
