= Awa-Kawashima Station =

Railway station in Yoshinogawa, Tokushima Prefecture, Japan

B11 Awa-Kawashima Station 阿波川島駅
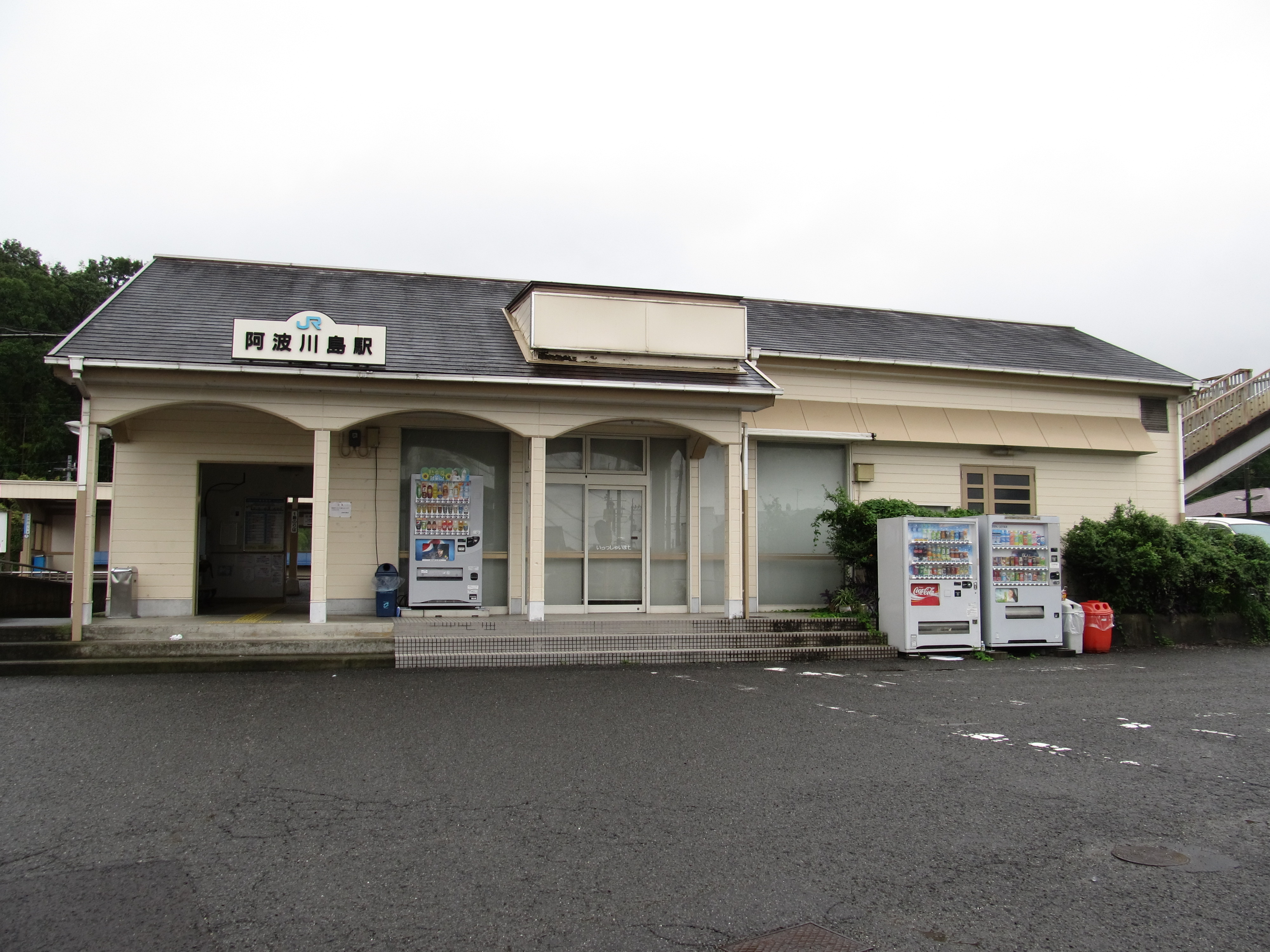
- Awa-Kawashima station building in 2014

General information
- Location: Kawashimacho Kawashima, Yoshinogawa-shi, Tokushima-ken 779-3301; Japan
- Coordinates: 34°3′42.69″N 134°19′14.78″E
- Operator: JR Shikoku
- Line: ■ Tokushima Line
- Distance: 46.2 km from Tsukuda
- Platforms: 1 side + 1 island platforms
- Tracks: 3

Construction
- Structure type: At grade
- Accessible: No - platforms linked by footbridge

Other information
- Status: Unstaffed (since 2010)
- Station code: B11

History
- Opened: 19 August 1899
- Former names: Kawashima (to 1914); Shingo (to 1915)

Passengers
- FY2014: 490
Location
- Location within Tokushima Prefecture Location within Japan

Awa-Kawashima Station (阿波川島駅, Awa-Kawashima-eki) is a passenger railway station located in the city of Yoshinogawa, Tokushima Prefecture, Japan. It is operated by JR Shikoku and has the station number "B11".

== Lines ==
Awa-Kawashima Station is served by the Tokushima Line and is 46.2 km from the beginning of the line at Tsukuda. Besides local service trains, the Tsurugisan limited express service between Tokushima and Awa-Ikeda also stops at Awa-Kawashima.

== Layout ==
The station consists of a side platform and an island platform serving 3 tracks. The station building has been unstaffed since 2010 and serves only as a waiting room. Access to the island platform is by means of a footbridge.

=== Platforms ===
1	■ Tokushima Line	for Anabuki and Awa-Ikeda
2, 3	■ Tokushima Line	for Kamojima and Tokushima

== Adjacent stations ==
«	Service	»
JR Limited Express Services
Kamojima	Tsurugisan	Awa-Yamakawa
Tokushima Line
Gaku	Local	Nishi-Oe

== History ==
The station was opened on 19 August 1899 as Kawashima Station by the privately run Tokushima Railway as the terminus of a line from Tokushima. It became a through-station on 23 December 1899 when the line was extended to Yamase. When the company was nationalized on 1 September 1907, Japanese Government Railways (JGR) took over control of the station and operated it as part of the Tokushima Line (later the Tokushima Main Line). On 25 March 1914 it was renamed Shingo Station (神後駅, Shingo-eki). On 1 July 1915 it was renamed Awa-Kawashima. With the privatization of Japanese National Railways (JNR), the successor of JGR, on 1 April 1987, the station came under the control of JR Shikoku. On 1 June 1988, the line was renamed the Tokushima Line.

== Passenger statistics ==
In fiscal 2014, the station was used by an average of 490 passengers daily.

== Surrounding area ==
- Kawashima Shrine
- Kawashima Castle
- Tokushima Agricultural Administration Office Area 2nd Section Government Building
- Yoshinogawa City Chamber of Commerce and Industry Kawashima Kaikan

== See also ==
- List of railway stations in Japan
