= Oshima Station =

Railway station in Mima, Tokushima Prefecture, Japan

B17 Oshima Station 小島駅
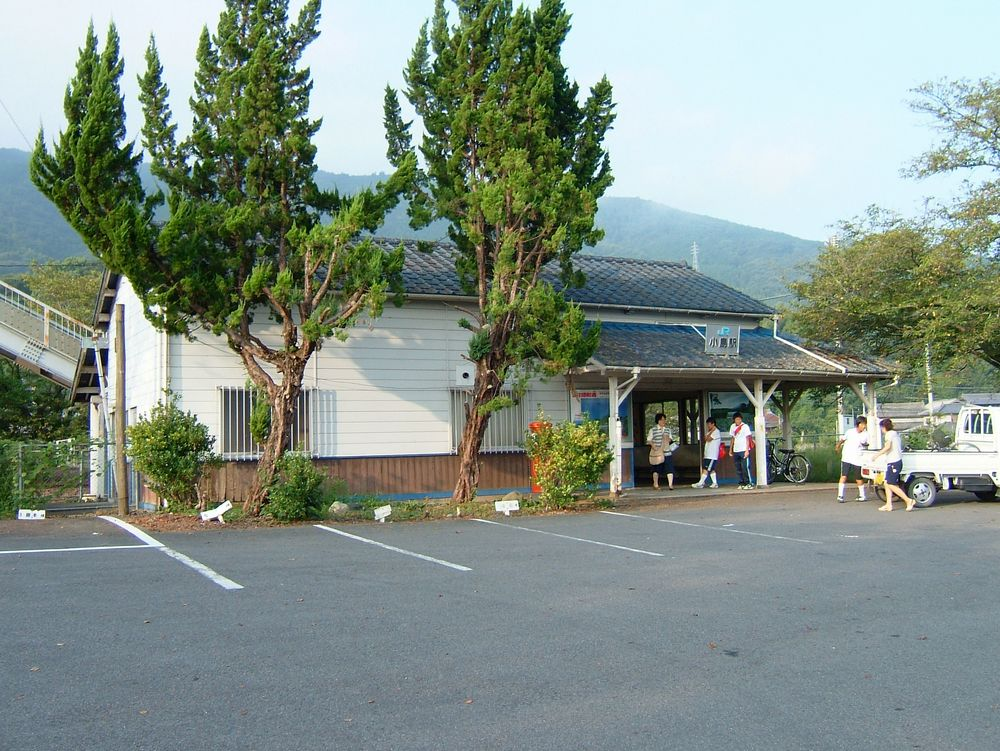
- Oshima Station, August 2006

General information
- Location: Oshima Anabukichō Mishima, Mima-shi, Tokushima-ken 779-3600; Japan
- Coordinates: 34°03′00″N 134°06′26″E
- Operator: JR Shikoku
- Line: ■ Tokushima Line
- Distance: 24.6 km from Tsukuda
- Platforms: 1 island platform
- Tracks: 2 + 1 siding

Construction
- Structure type: At grade
- Accessible: No - island platform accessed by footbridge

Other information
- Status: Unstaffed
- Station code: B17

History
- Opened: 25 March 1914
Location
- Location within Tokushima Prefecture Location within Japan

Oshima Station (小島駅, Oshima-eki) is a passenger railway station located in the city of Mima, Tokushima Prefecture, Japan. It is operated by JR Shikoku and has the station number "B17".

== Lines ==
The station is served by the Tokushima Line and is 24.6 km from the beginning of the line at Tsukuda. Only local trains stop at the station.

== Layout ==
The station consists of an island platform serving 2 tracks. A siding branches off track 1 and ends in a large vehicle shed near the station building. Access to the island platform is by means of a footbridge. The station ticket window is unstaffed but there is a ticket vending machine. In addition, a shop near the station sells some types of tickets as a kan'i itaku agent.

=== Platforms ===
1	■ Tokushima Line	for Anabuki and Tokushima
2	■ Tokushima Line	for Awa-Ikeda

== Adjacent stations ==
«	Service	»
Tokushima Line
Limited Express Tsurigisan: Does not stop at this station
Sadamitsu	Local	Anabuki

== History ==
Oshima Station was opened on 25 March 1914 as one of several intermediate stations built when Japanese Government Railways (JGR) extended the track of the Tokushima Main Line from Awa-Yamakawa to Awa-Ikeda. With the privatization of Japanese National Railways (JNR), the successor to JGR, on 1 April 1987, Oshima came under the control of JR Shikoku. On 1 June 1988, the line was renamed the Tokushima Line.

== Surrounding area ==
- Oshima Bridge

== See also ==
- List of railway stations in Japan
