= Kawata Station =

Railway station in Yoshinogawa, Tokushima Prefecture, Japan

B15 Kawata Station 川田駅
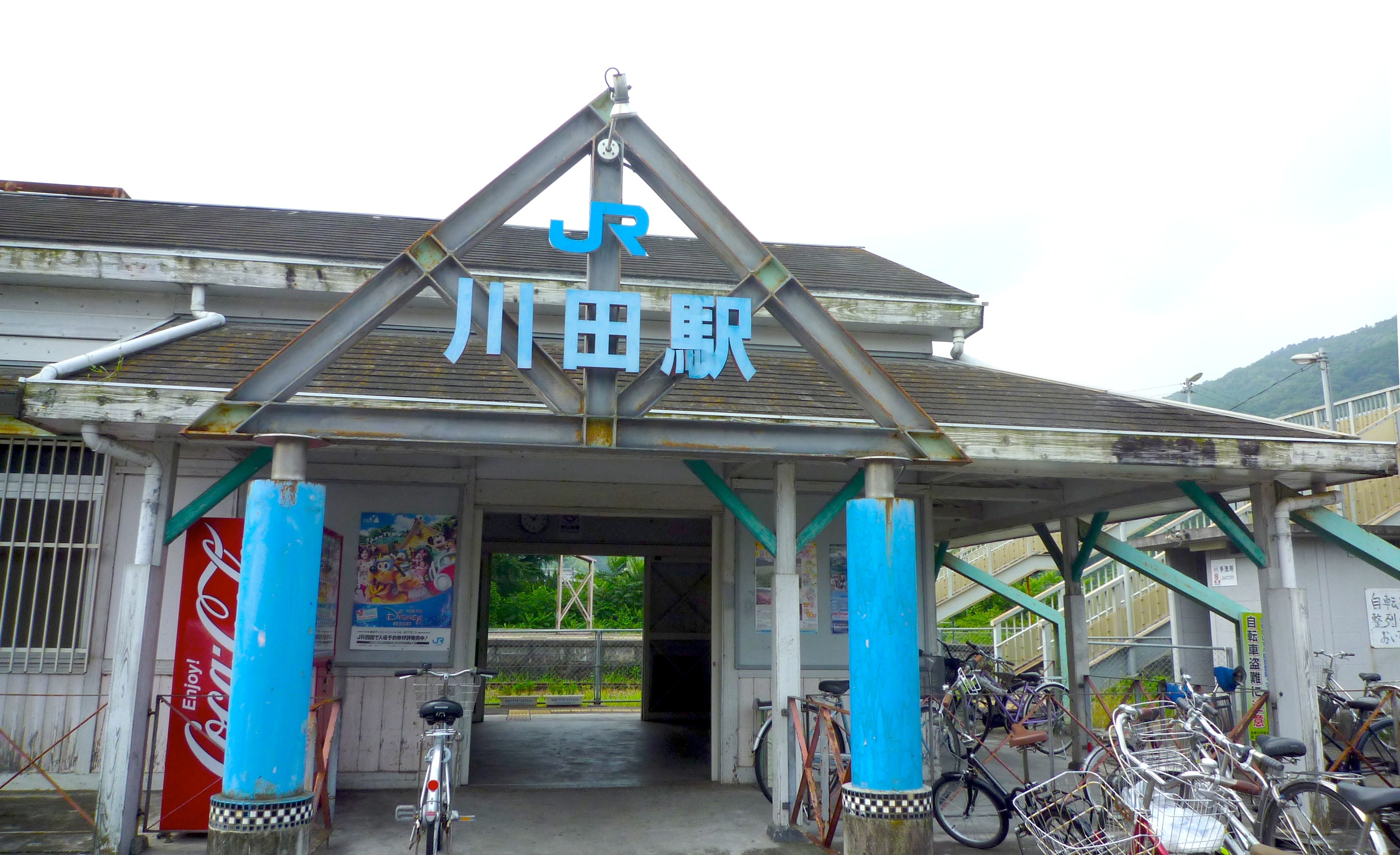
- Kawata Station entrance, August 2009

General information
- Location: Yamakawacho Kawata, Yoshinogawa-shi, Tokushima-ken 779-3404; Japan
- Coordinates: 34°03′40″N 134°12′16″E
- Operator: JR Shikoku
- Line: ■ Tokushima Line
- Distance: 34.8 km from Tsukuda
- Platforms: 1 island platform
- Tracks: 2 + 1 passing loop

Construction
- Structure type: At grade
- Accessible: No - island platform accessed by footbridge

Other information
- Status: Unstaffed
- Station code: B15

History
- Opened: 25 March 1914
Location
- Location within Tokushima Prefecture Location within Japan

Kawata Station (川田駅, Kawata-eki) is a passenger railway station located in the city of Yoshinogawa, Tokushima Prefecture, Japan. It is operated by JR Shikoku and has the station number "B15".

== Lines ==
Kawata Station is served by the Tokushima Line and is 34.8 km from the beginning of the line at Tsukuda. Only local trains stop at the station.

== Layout ==
The station consists of an island platform serving two tracks. A passing loop runs between the station building and track 1. The station building is unstaffed and serves only as a waiting room. Access to the island platform is by means of a footbridge.

=== Platforms ===
1	■ Tokushima Line	for Sako and Tokushima
2	■ Tokushima Line	for Tsukuda and Awa-Ikeda

== Adjacent stations ==
«	Service	»
Tokushima Line
Limited Express Tsurigisan: Does not stop at this station
Anabuki	Local	Awa-Yamakawa

== History ==
An earlier station at a different location but named "Kawada" (with the same Kanji name 川田駅) had been established by the private Tokushima Railway on 28 August 1907. After the company was nationalized on 1 September 1907, Japanese Government Railways (JGR) took over control of the stations and operated it as part of the Tokushima Line (later the Tokushima Main Line) from Tokushima to Awa-Yamakawa (then known as Yudate), Kawada and Funato. On 25 March 1914, JGR extended the track to Awa-Ikeda. In the process, Kawada and Funato were closed and Kawata was opened as a new station 1.3 km further to the west than Kawada. With the privatization of Japanese National Railways (JNR), the successor to JGR, on 1 April 1987, the station came under the control of JR Shikoku. On 1 June 1988, the line was renamed the Tokushima Line.

== Surrounding area ==
The area around the station is the center of former Kawada Town

- Kawada Post Office
- Yoshinogawa City Kawadanishi Elementary School

== See also ==
- List of railway stations in Japan
