= Oezuka Station =

Railway station in Yoshinogawa, Tokushima Prefecture, Japan

B08 Oezuka Station 麻植塚駅
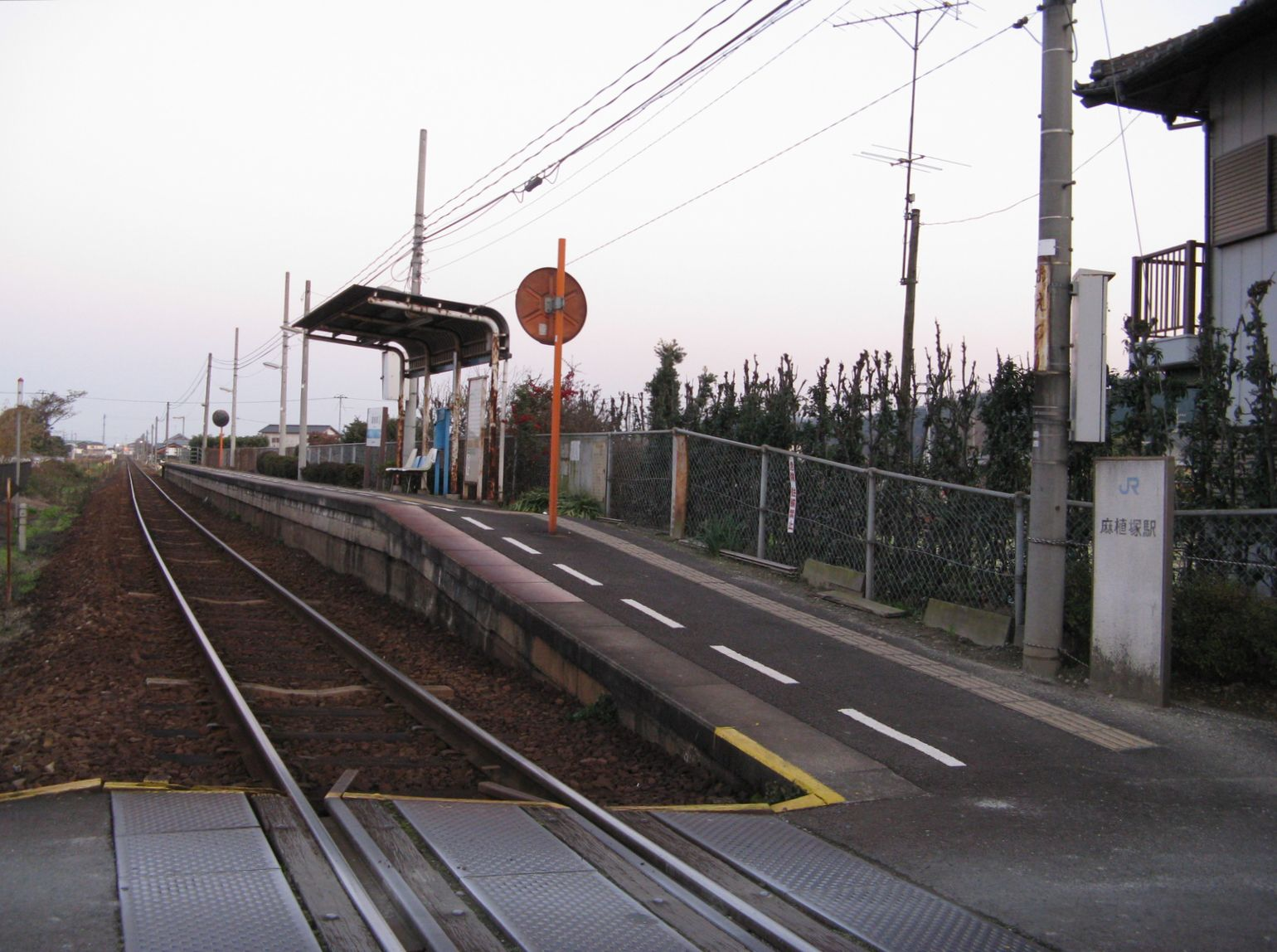
- Oezuka Station, December 2008

General information
- Location: Kamojimacho Ushishima, Yoshinogawa-shi, Tokushima-ken 776-0001; Japan
- Coordinates: 34°04′31″N 134°22′35″E
- Operator: JR Shikoku
- Line: ■ Tokushima Line
- Distance: 51.8 km from Tsukuda
- Platforms: 1 side platform
- Tracks: 1

Construction
- Structure type: At grade
- Accessible: Yes - ramp leads up to platform

Other information
- Status: Unstaffed
- Station code: B08

History
- Opened: 20 September 1934
Location
- Location within Tokushima Prefecture Location within Japan

Oezuka Station (麻植塚駅, Oezuka-eki) is a passenger railway station located in the city of Yoshinogawa, Tokushima Prefecture, Japan. It is operated by JR Shikoku and has the station number "B08".

== Lines ==
Oezuka Station is served by the Tokushima Line and is 51.8 km from the beginning of the line at Tsukuda. Only local trains stop at the station.

== Layout ==
The station, which is unstaffed, consists of a side platform serving a single track. There is no station building, only a shelter on the platform for waiting passengers. A ramp leads up to the platform from the access road.

== Adjacent stations ==
«	Service	»
Tokushima Line
Limited Express Tsurugisan: Does not stop at this station
Kamojima	Local	Ushinoshima

== History ==
Oezuka Station was opened on 20 September 1934 by Japanese Government Railways (JGR) on the then Tokushima Main Line. On 10 August 1941 the station was closed. It was reopened on 1 November 1957. With the privatization of Japanese National Railways (JNR), the successor of JGR, on 1 April 1987, the station came under the control of JR Shikoku. On 1 June 1988, the line was renamed the Tokushima Line.

== Surrounding area ==
- Japan National Route 192
- Yoshinogawa City Kamoshima Higashi Junior High School

== See also ==
- List of railway stations in Japan
