= Tokushima Line =

Railway line in Tokushima Prefecture, Japan

- A JR Shikoku 1500 series on a service to Awa-Kawashima between Tokushima and Sako stations

Overview
- Locale: Tokushima Prefecture
- Termini: Sako; Tsukuda
- Stations: 24

Service
- Type: Heavy rail
- Operator: JR Shikoku

History
- Opened: 1899; 127 years ago

Technical
- Line length: 67.5 km (41.9 mi)
- Track gauge: 1,067 mm (3 ft 6 in)
- Electrification: None
- Operating speed: 110 km/h (68 mph)
Route map

The Tokushima Line (徳島線, Tokushima-sen) is a railway line in Tokushima Prefecture, Japan, owned and operated by Shikoku Railway Company (JR Shikoku). The Tokushima Line connects Sako Station in Tokushima and Tsukuda Station in Miyoshi from west to east in central Tokushima Prefecture. As the line parallels the Yoshino River, it is officially nicknamed the "Yoshino River Blue Line" (よしの川ブルーライン). In addition to linking Tokushima and Kōchi prefectures, the line's eastern half serves the city of Tokushima as a commuter line.

== Services ==
Although the official start of the line is at Tsukuda, rail services from Sako to Tsukuda are considered outbound, with the reverse being inbound. This is to allow for more efficient connecting service to the Dosan Line at Tsukuda.

The Tsurugisan limited express provides the bulk of express services on the line from Awa-Ikeda (on the Dosan Line) and Anabuki to Tokushima and Kaifu (on the Mugi Line). In the March 2009 timetable revision, a single inbound Muroto limited express was established, providing through service to Kaifu on the Mugi Line.

There are two to three local trains per hour, with most trains serving the Tokushima – Awa-Ikeda, Tokushima – Anabuki, and Tokushima – Awa-Kawashima sections. Some trains continue through to the Mugi Line via Tokushima. Local trains are generally driver-only operated, but some daytime and late-night trains between Tokushima and Anabuki, as well as three trains between Anabuki and Awa-Ikeda, often have a conductor on board. Due to the length of platforms, train lengths are limited to a maximum of four cars.

The Tokushima Line serves as a bypass route between Tokushima and Kōchi; in the past, the Asa and Yoshinogawa express and some Tsurugisan limited express services connected the two cities (now passengers must change at Awa-Ikeda to the Nanpū limited express).

== Station list ==
- All stations are located in Tokushima Prefecture.
- Local trains stop at all stations. For details of the Tsurugisan and Muroto limited express services, see the respective articles.
- Trains can pass one another at stations marked "◇" and cannot pass at those marked "｜".

Station No.	Station	Japanese	Distance (km)		Transfers		Location
Station No.	Station	Japanese	Between stations	From Sako	Transfers		Location
T00	Tokushima	徳島	-	1.4	Mugi Line (M00)	◇	Tokushima
Through from Tokushima via the Kōtoku Line
B01	Sako	佐古	1.4	0.0	Kōtoku Line (T01) (for Ikenotani and Naruto Line)*	◇	Tokushima
B02	Kuramoto	蔵本	1.9	1.9		◇	Tokushima
B03	Akui	鮎喰	1.1	3.0		｜	Tokushima
B04	Kō	府中	2.2	5.2		◇	Tokushima
B05	Ishii	石井	3.7	8.9		◇	Ishii, Myōzai District
B06	Shimoura	下浦	2.3	11.2		｜	Ishii, Myōzai District
B07	Ushinoshima	牛島	2.5	13.7		◇	Yoshinogawa
B08	Oezuka	麻植塚	2.0	15.7		｜	Yoshinogawa
B09	Kamojima	鴨島	1.8	17.5		◇	Yoshinogawa
B10	Nishi-Oe	西麻植	1.9	19.4		｜	Yoshinogawa
B11	Awa-Kawashima	阿波川島	1.9	21.3		◇	Yoshinogawa
B12	Gaku	学	3.5	24.8		◇	Yoshinogawa
B13	Yamase	山瀬	2.8	27.6		◇	Yoshinogawa
B14	Awa-Yamakawa	阿波山川	2.2	29.8		｜	Yoshinogawa
B15	Kawata	川田	2.9	32.7		◇	Yoshinogawa
B16	Anabuki	穴吹	4.5	37.2		◇	Mima
B17	Oshima	小島	5.7	42.9		◇	Mima
B18	Sadamitsu	貞光	5.2	48.1		◇	Tsurugi, Mima District
B19	Awa-Handa	阿波半田	2.2	50.3		｜	Tsurugi, Mima District
B20	Eguchi	江口	6.0	56.3		◇	Higashimiyoshi, Miyoshi District
B21	Mikamo	三加茂	2.5	58.8		｜	Higashimiyoshi, Miyoshi District
B22	Awa-Kamo	阿波加茂	2.1	60.9		◇	Higashimiyoshi, Miyoshi District
B23	Tsuji	辻	5.1	66.0		◇	Miyoshi
B24	Tsukuda	佃	1.5	67.5	Dosan Line (D21) (for Tadotsu)	◇	Miyoshi
Through to Awa-Ikeda via the Dosan Line
B25	Awa-Ikeda	阿波池田	5.1	72.6	Dosan Line (D22) (for Kōchi)	◇	Miyoshi

*: Although the official start of the Naruto Line is at Ikenotani, most trains travel through on the Kōtoku Line to Tokushima.

== History ==
The first section of the line, between Tokushima and Kawata, was opened in 1899 by the Tokushima Railway (徳島鉄道, Tokushima-tetsudō). In 1907, the Tokushima Railway was nationalised under the Railway Nationalization Act.

The line was extended to Awa-Ikeda in 1914, connecting to the Dosan Line, and further extended to Minawa in 1931, which at the time was classed as an extension of the Tokushima line. In 1935 the section was incorporated into the Dosan Line.

Freight service on the line ceased in 1986.

== See also ==
- List of railway lines in Japan
