= Yoshinogawa, Tokushima =

Yoshinogawa 吉野川市
- City
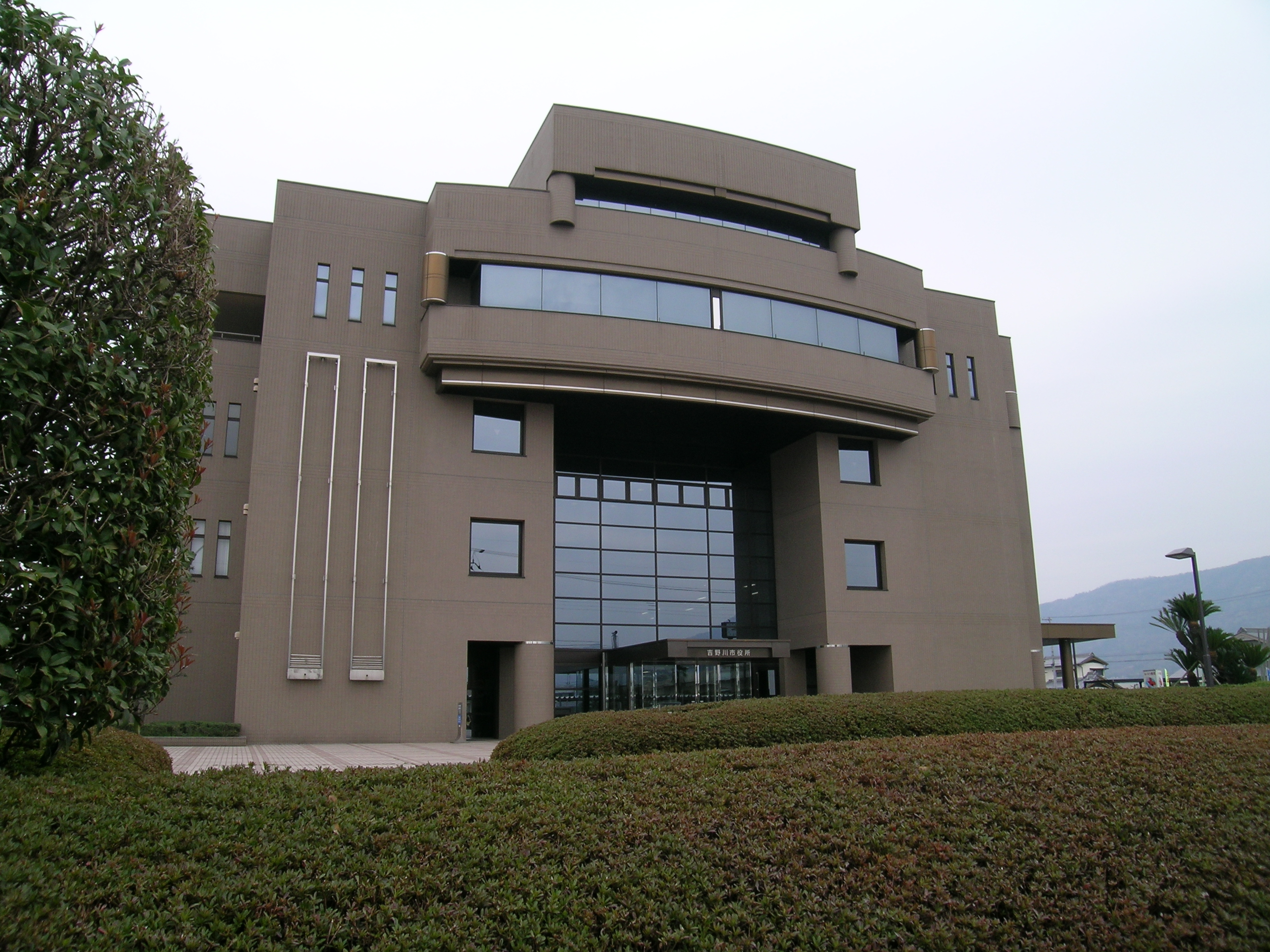
- Yoshinogawa City Hall

- Flag Seal
- Location of Yoshinogawa in Tokushima Prefecture

- Location in Japan
- Coordinates: 34°03′47″N 134°21′41″E
- Country: Japan
- Region: Shikoku
- Prefecture: Tokushima

Government
  - Mayor: Takashi Harai (since October 2019)

Area
  - Total: 144.14 km^{2} (55.65 sq mi)

Population (June 30, 2022)
  - Total: 39,150
  - Density: 271.6/km^{2} (703.5/sq mi)
- Time zone: UTC+09:00 (JST)
- City hall address: Kamoshimachō Kamoshima115-1, Yoshinogawa-shi, Tokushima-ken 776-8611
- Website: Official website
- Symbols
- Bird: Alcedo atthis
- Flower: Chrysanthemum
- Tree: Rhododendron

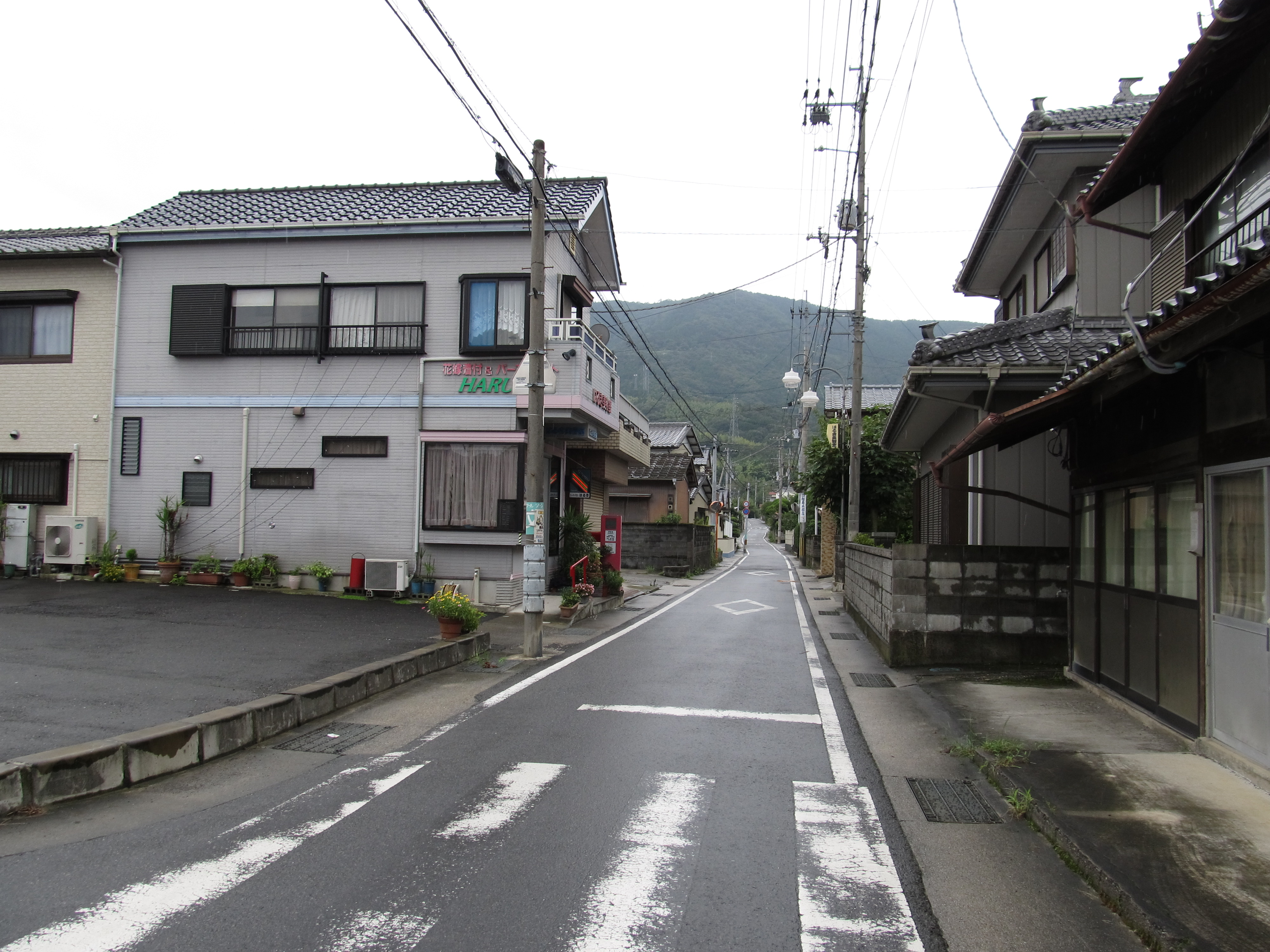
Tokushima Prefectural Road Route 244 in Yoshinogawa

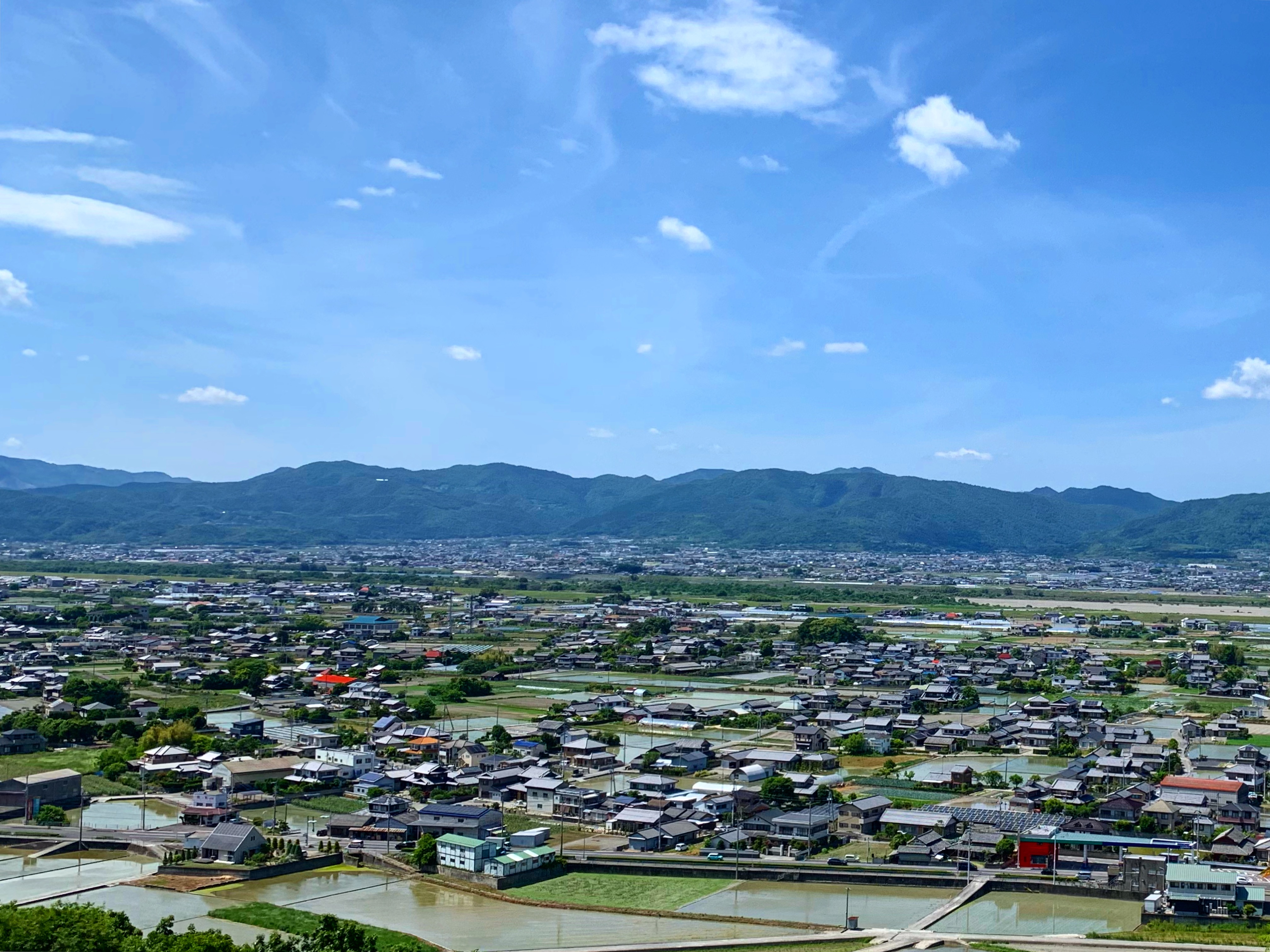
Panorama view of Kamojima area and Mount Kouno

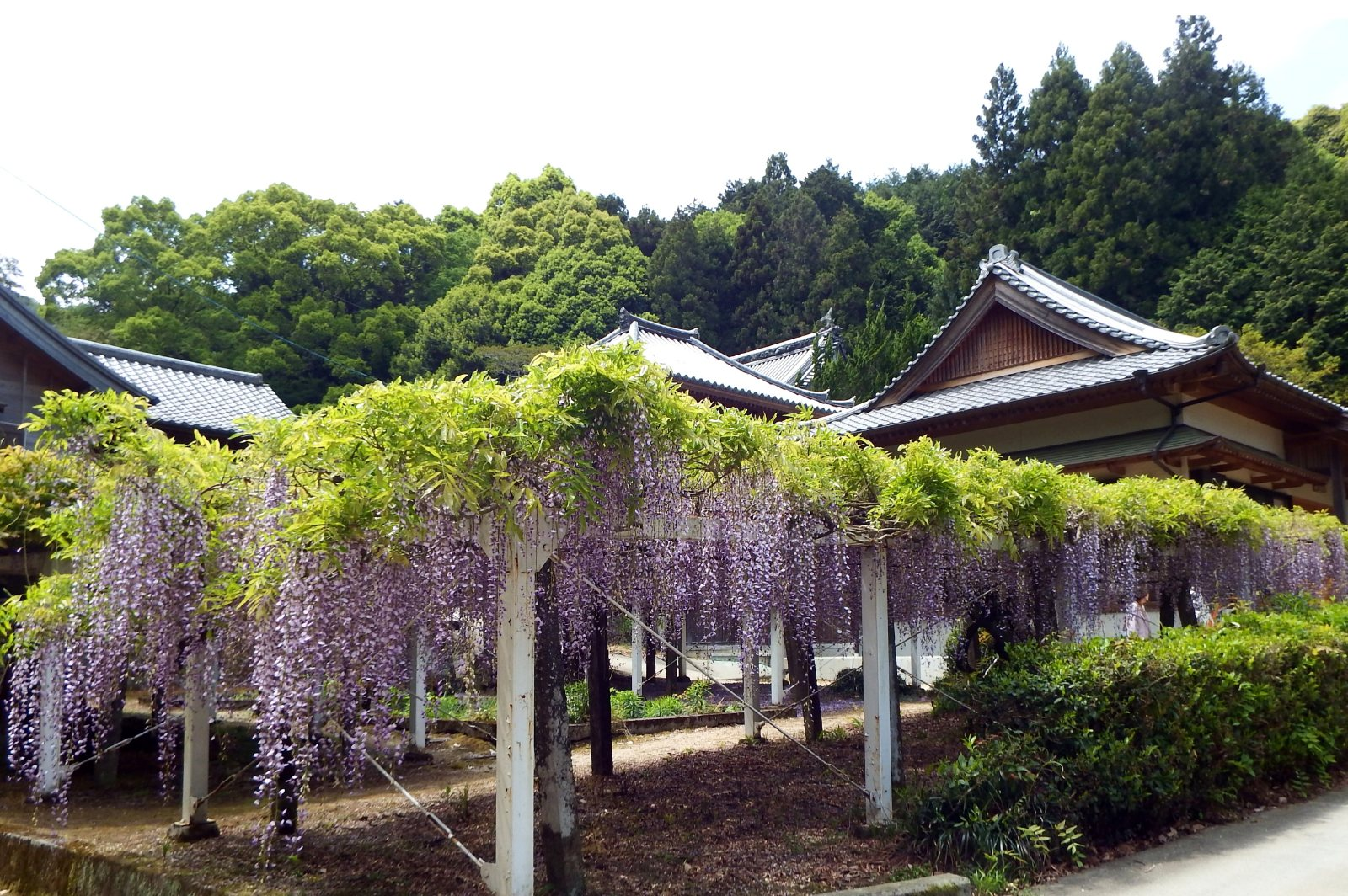
Fujii-dera wisteria

Yoshinogawa (吉野川市, Yoshinogawa-shi) is a city located in Tokushima Prefecture, Japan. As of 30 June 2022, the city had an estimated population of 39,150 in 17958 households and a population density of 270 persons per km². The total area of the city is 144.14 square kilometres (55.65 sq mi).

== Geography ==
Yoshinogawa is located in the northern part of Tokushima Prefecture on the island of Shikoku. It is located on the south bank of the Yoshino River, which runs east to west and most of the population is concentrated in the Tokushima Plain along this river.

=== Neighbouring municipalities ===
Tokushima Prefecture

- Awa
- Ishii
- Kamiita
- Kamiyama
- Mima

=== Climate ===
Yoshinogawa has a humid subtropical climate (Köppen Cfa) characterized by warm summers and cool winters with light to no snowfall. The average annual temperature in Yoshinogawa is 14.8 °C. The average annual rainfall is 2137 mm with September as the wettest month. The temperatures are highest on average in August, at around 26.1 °C, and lowest in January, at around 4.0 °C.

== Demographics ==
Per Japanese census data, the population of Yoshinogawa has declined slowly over the past 30 years.

Historical population
Year	Pop.	±%
1960	51,640	—
1970	46,256	−10.4%
1980	48,766	+5.4%
1990	48,938	+0.4%
2000	46,974	−4.0%
2010	44,034	−6.3%

== History ==
As with all of Tokushima Prefecture, the area of Yoshinogawa was part of ancient Awa Province. During the Edo period, the area was part of the holdings of Tokushima Domain ruled by the Hachisuka clan from their seat at Tokushima Castle. The area was divided into 11 villages within Oe District, Tokushima with the creation of the modern municipalities system on October 1, 1889. The city of Yoshinogawa was established on October 1, 2004, from the merger of the towns of Kamojima, Kawashima and Yamakawa, and the village of Misato (all from Oe District, which was dissolved as a result of this merger).

== Government ==
Yoshinogawa has a mayor-council form of government with a directly elected mayor and a unicameral city council of 20 members. Yoshinogawa contributes two members to the Tokushima Prefectural Assembly. In terms of national politics, the city is part of Tokushima 2nd district of the lower house of the Diet of Japan.

== Economy ==
Yoshinogawa has a mixed economy of agriculture and regional commerce. Due to its proximity to the city of Tokushima, it is increasingly becoming a commuter town.

== Education ==
Yoshinogawa has 11 public elementary schools and four public middle schools operated by the city government and one public high school and one public combined middle/high school operated by the Tokushima Prefectural Department of Education. The prefecture also operates one special education school for the handicapped.

== Transportation ==
=== Railway ===
Shikoku Railway Company – Kōtoku Line

- Ushinoshima - Oezuka - Kamojima - Nishi-Oe - Awa-Kawashima - Gaku - Yamase - Awa-Yamakawa - Kawata

=== Highways ===
- National Route 192
- National Route 193
- National Route 318

== Local attractions ==
- Fujii-dera, 11th temple on the Shikoku Pilgrimage
- Kawashima Castle

== Notable people from Yoshinogawa ==
- Yoshikawa Akimasa, (1842 – 1920) cabinet minister
- Masaharu Gotōda, (1914 – 2005), politician
- Ryuho Okawa, (b. 1956) a religious leader, established Happy Science, from Kawashima-cho
- Ryusei Takeoka, (b. 2001) baseball player
