= Ishii Station (Tokushima) =

Railway station in Ishii, Tokushima Prefecture, Japan

B05 Ishii Station 石井駅
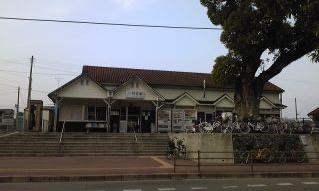
- Ishii Station in 2010

General information
- Location: Ishii, Ishii-chō, Myōzai-gun, Tokushima-ken 779-3233; Japan
- Coordinates: 34°04′13″N 134°26′38″E
- Operator: JR Shikoku
- Line: ■ Tokushima Line
- Distance: 58.6 km from Tsukuda
- Platforms: 2 side platforms
- Tracks: 2 + 1 siding

Construction
- Structure type: At grade
- Accessible: No - platforms linked by footbridge

Other information
- Status: Staffed - JR ticket window
- Station code: B05

History
- Opened: 16 February 1899

Passengers
- FY2018: 2006
Location
- Location within Tokushima Prefecture Location within Japan

Ishii Station (石井駅, Ishii-eki) is a passenger railway station located in the town of Ishii, Myōzai District, Tokushima Prefecture, Japan. It is operated by JR Shikoku and has the station number "B05".

== Lines ==
Ishii Station is served by the Tokushima Line and is 58.6 km from the beginning of the line at Tsukuda. Besides local service trains, the Tsurugisan limited express service also stops at Kuramoto.

== Layout ==
The station consists of two opposed side platforms serving 2 tracks. Track 2 is the through-track while track 1 is a passing loop. A siding branches off track 1. A station building houses a waiting room and a JR ticket window (without a Midori no Madoguchi facility). Access to the opposite platform is by means of a footbridge.

== Adjacent stations ==
| « | Service | » |
JR Limited Express Services
| Kamojima | Tsurugisan | Kuramoto |
Tokushima Line
| Shimoura | Local | Kō |

== History ==
Ishii Station was opened on 16 February 1899 by the privately run Tokushima Railway as an intermediate station when a line was built between Tokushima and Kamojima. When the company was nationalized on 1 September 1907, Japanese Government Railways (JGR) took over control of the station and operated it as part of the Tokushima Line (later the Tokushima Main Line). With the privatization of Japanese National Railways (JNR), the successor of JGR, on 1 April 1987, the station came under the control of JR Shikoku. On 1 June 1988, the line was renamed the Tokushima Line.

== Surrounding area ==
- Ishii Town Hall
- Ishiicho Central Community Center
- Tokushima Prefectural Myozai High School
- Ishii Municipal Ishii Junior High School

== See also ==
- List of railway stations in Japan
