= Shimoura Station =

Railway station in Ishii, Tokushima Prefecture, Japan

B06 Shimoura Station 下浦駅
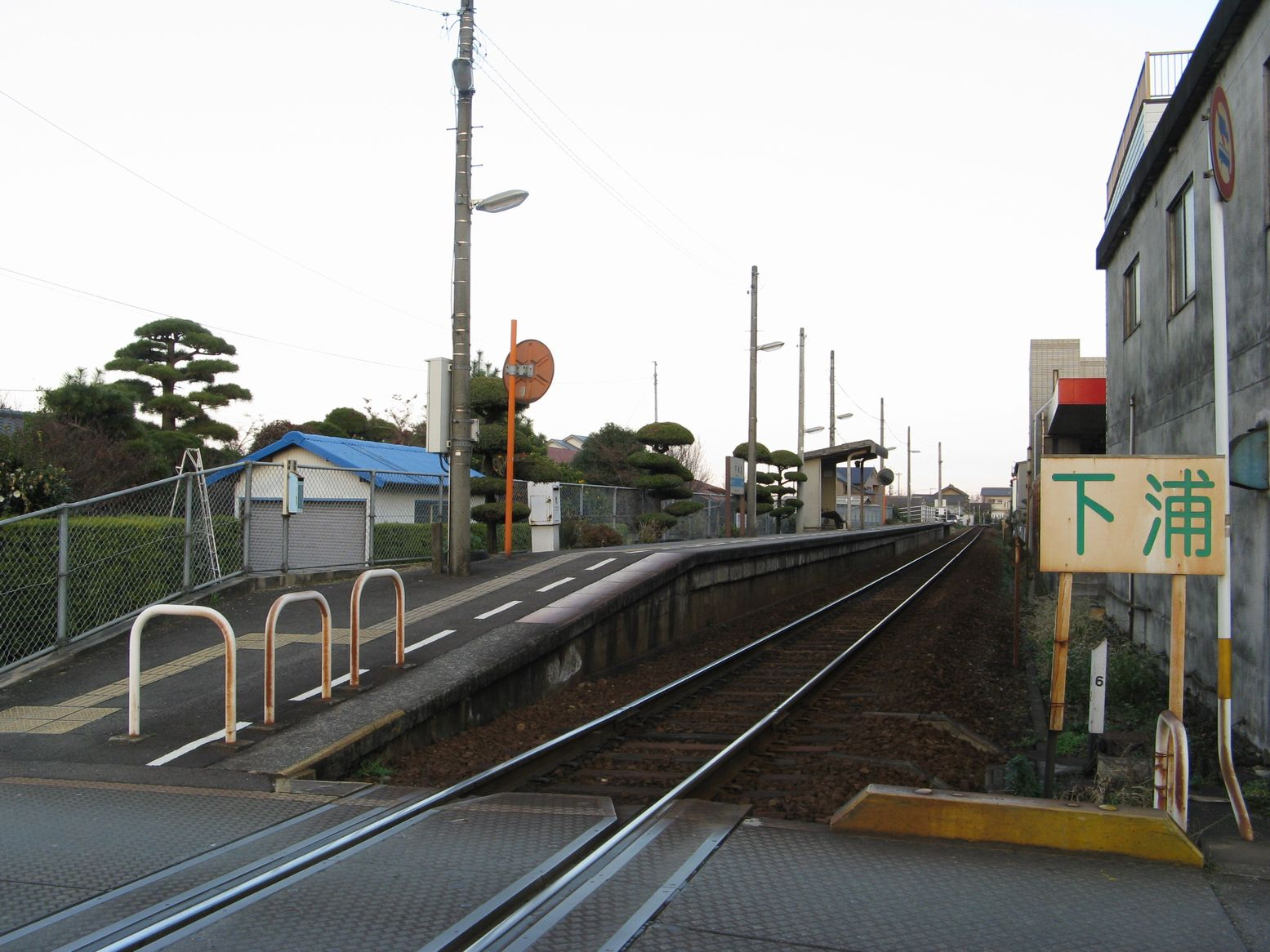
- Shimoura Station in 2008

General information
- Location: Shimoura Urashō, Ishii-chō, Myōzai-gun, Tokushima-ken 779-3200; Japan
- Coordinates: 34°04′03″N 134°25′15″E
- Operator: JR Shikoku
- Line: ■ Tokushima Line
- Distance: 56.3 km from Tsukuda
- Platforms: 1 side platform
- Tracks: 1

Construction
- Structure type: At grade
- Accessible: Yes - ramp leads up to platform

Other information
- Status: Unstaffed
- Station code: B06

History
- Opened: 20 September 1934
Location
- Location within Tokushima Prefecture Location within Japan

Shimoura Station (下浦駅, Shimoura-eki) is a passenger railway station located in the town of Ishii, Myōzai District, Tokushima Prefecture, Japan. It is operated by JR Shikoku and has the station number "B06".

== Lines ==
Shimoura Station is served by the Tokushima Line and is 56.3 km from the beginning of the line at Tsukuda. Only local trains stop at the station.

== Layout ==
The station, which is unstaffed, consists of a side platform serving a single track. There is no station building, only a shelter on the platform for waiting passengers. A ramp leads up to the platform from the access road. There is a designated parking area for bicycles near the station.

== Adjacent stations ==
| « | Service | » |
Tokushima Line
Limited Express Tsurugisan: Does not stop at this station
| Ushinoshima | Local | Ishii |

== History ==
Shimoura Station was opened on 20 September 1934 by Japanese Government Railways (JGR) on the then Tokushima Main Line. On 10 August 1941 the station was closed. It was reopened on 1 November 1957. With the privatization of Japanese National Railways (JNR), the successor of JGR, on 1 April 1987, the station came under the control of JR Shikoku. On 1 June 1988, the line was renamed the Tokushima Line.

== Surrounding area ==
- Ishii Municipal Takaura Junior High School
- Ishii Municipal Urasho Elementary School

== See also ==
- List of railway stations in Japan
