= Nishi-Oe Station =

Railway station in Yoshinogawa, Tokushima Prefecture, Japan

B10 Nishi-Oe Station 西麻植駅
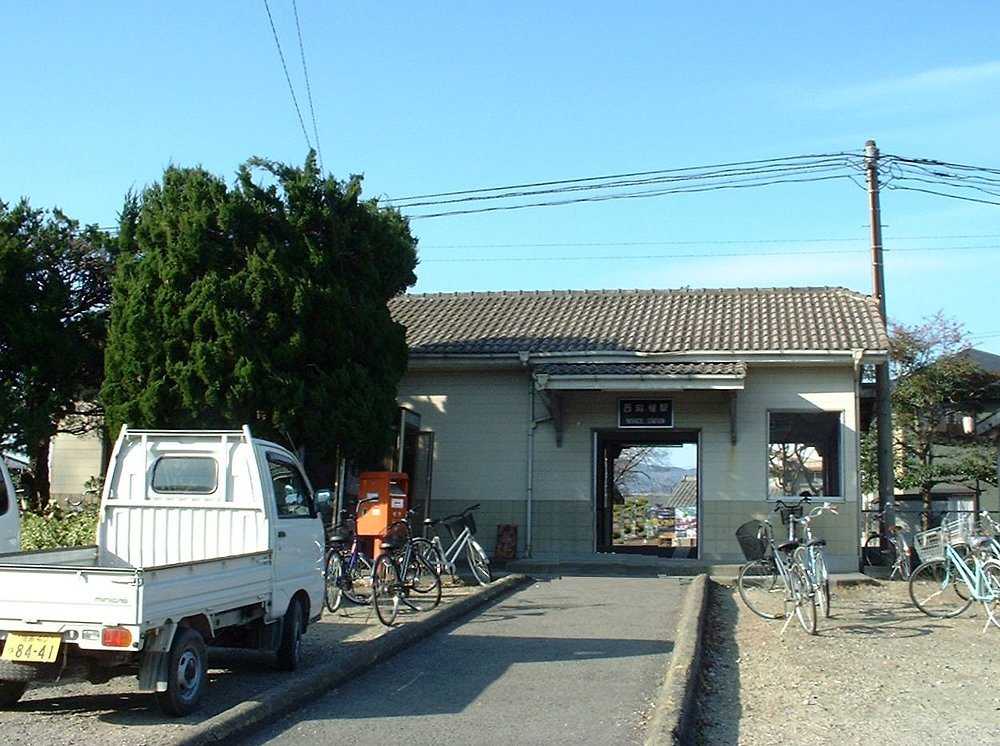
- Nishi-Oe Station, January 2004

General information
- Location: Oeichi Kamojimachō Nishioe, Yoshinogawa-shi, Tokushima-ken 776-0020; Japan
- Coordinates: 34°04′20″N 134°20′11″E
- Operator: JR Shikoku
- Line: ■ Tokushima Line
- Distance: 48.1 km from Tsukuda
- Platforms: 1 side platform
- Tracks: 1

Construction
- Structure type: At grade
- Accessible: Yes - no steps needed to access platform

Other information
- Status: Unstaffed
- Station code: B10

History
- Opened: 5 October 1899
Location
- Location within Tokushima Prefecture Location within Japan

Nishi-Oe Station (西麻植駅, Nishi-Oe-eki) is a passenger railway station located in the city of Yoshinogawa, Tokushima Prefecture, Japan. It is operated by JR Shikoku and has the station number "B10".

== Lines ==
Nishi-Oe Station is served by the Tokushima Line and is 48.1 km from the beginning of the line at Tsukuda. Only local trains stop at the station.

== Layout ==
The station consists of a side platform serving a single curved section of track. The station building is unstaffed and serves only as a waiting room.

== Adjacent stations ==
«	Service	»
Tokushima Line
Limited Express Tsurugisan: Does not stop at this station
Awa-Kawashima	Local	Kamojima

== History ==
Nishi-Oe Station was opened on 5 October 1899 by the privately run Tokushima Railway as an intermediate station on an existing line between Tokushima and Awa-Kawashima. When the company was nationalized on 1 September 1907, Japanese Government Railways took over control of the station and operated it as part of the Tokushima Line (later the Tokushima Main Line). With the privatization of Japanese National Railways, the successor of Japanese Government Railways, on 1 April 1987, the station came under the control of JR Shikoku. On 1 June 1988, the line was renamed the Tokushima Line.

== Surrounding area ==
- Yoshinogawa Medical Center
- Yoshinogawa City Nishioe Elementary School

== See also ==
- List of railway stations in Japan
