= Tsurugisan (train) =

Japanese limited express train service

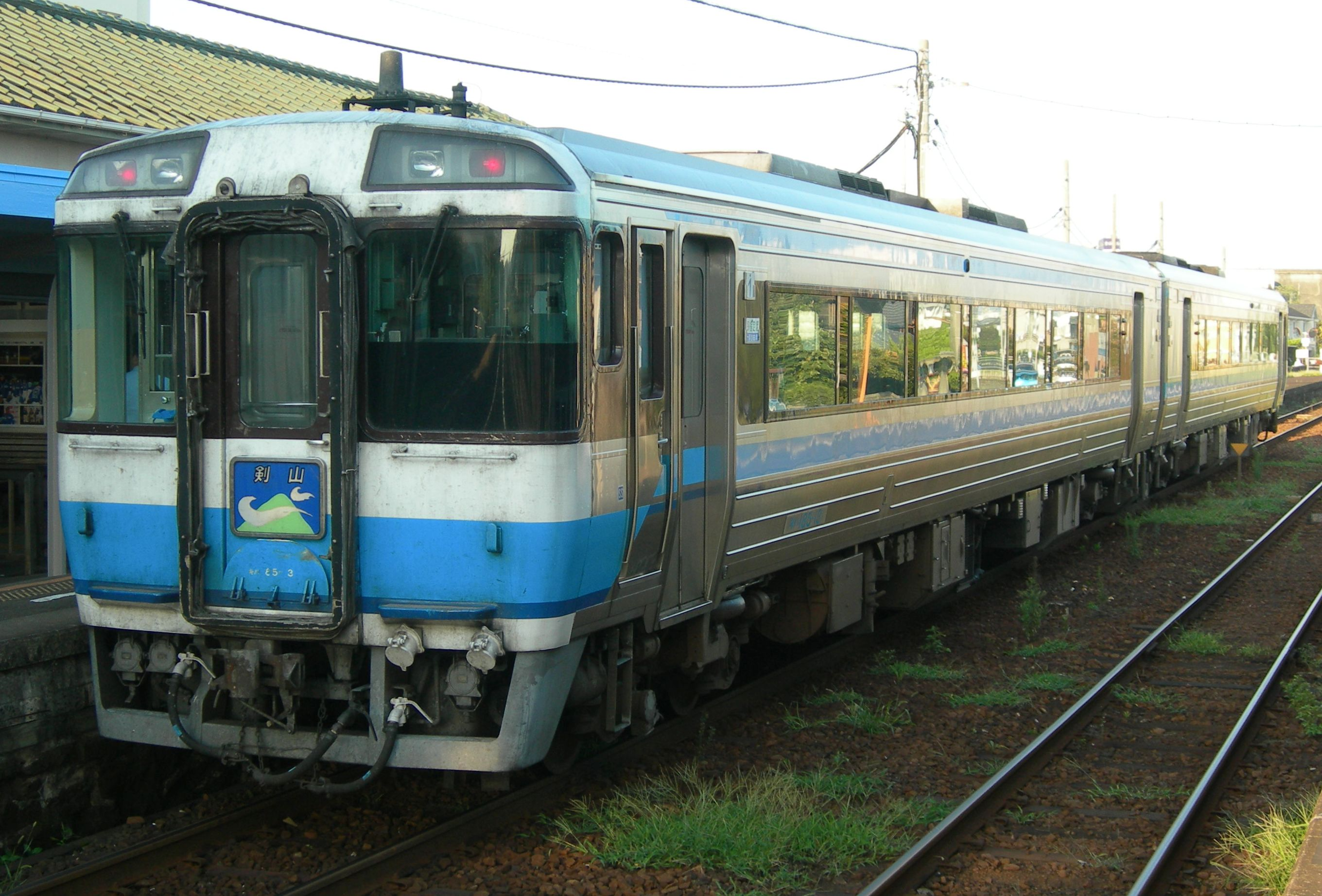
- A KiHa 185 series DMU on a Tsurugisan service in September 2011

Overview
- Service type: Limited express
- Status: Operational
- Locale: Shikoku, Japan
- Predecessor: Yoshinokawa
- First service: 16 March 1996
- Current operator(s): JR Shikoku

Route
- Termini: Tokushima; Awa-Ikeda
- Stops: 10
- Distance travelled: 74.0 km (46.0 mi)
- Average journey time: 1 hour 15 minutes approx
- Service frequency: 7 return workings daily
- Line(s) used: Kōtoku Line, Tokushima Line, Dosan Line

On-board services
- Class(es): Standard class only
- Disabled access: Yes
- Seating arrangements: Unidirectional 2+2
- Sleeping arrangements: None
- Catering facilities: None
- Observation facilities: None
- Entertainment facilities: None
- Other facilities: Toilet

Technical
- Rolling stock: KiHa 185 series DMU
- Track gauge: 1,067 mm (3 ft 6 in)
- Electrification: Diesel
- Operating speed: 110 km/h (68 mph)
- Track owner(s): JR Shikoku

The Tsurugisan (剣山) is a limited express train service in Japan operated by Shikoku Railway Company (JR Shikoku), which runs between Tokushima and Awa-Ikeda via Anabuki. The train is named after Mount Tsurugi, the second-highest mountain in Shikoku.

== Route ==
The stations served by this service are as follows:

Tokushima - Kuramoto - (Ishii) - Kamojima - (Awa-Kawashima) - Awa-Yamakawa - Anabuki - Sadamitsu - Awa-Kamo - Awa-Ikeda

Stations in brackets () are stations where not all trains stop at.

- Down Tsurugisan no. 5, up no. 6 and up no. 10 services do not stop at Ishii.
- Tsurugisan no. 10 does not stop at Awa-Kawashima.

== Rolling stock ==
Services are formed of 2-car KiHa 185 series diesel multiple unit (DMU) trains, based at Takamatsu Depot. Some trains are lengthened to three cars at busy periods.

== History ==
Tsurugisan services were introduced from the start of the 16 March 1996 timetable revision, operating between Tokushima and Kochi, and replacing some of the earlier Yoshinokawa (よしの川) express services.

== See also ==
- Tsurugi (train), another train service
