= Ryusei Takeoka =

Japanese baseball player (born 2001)

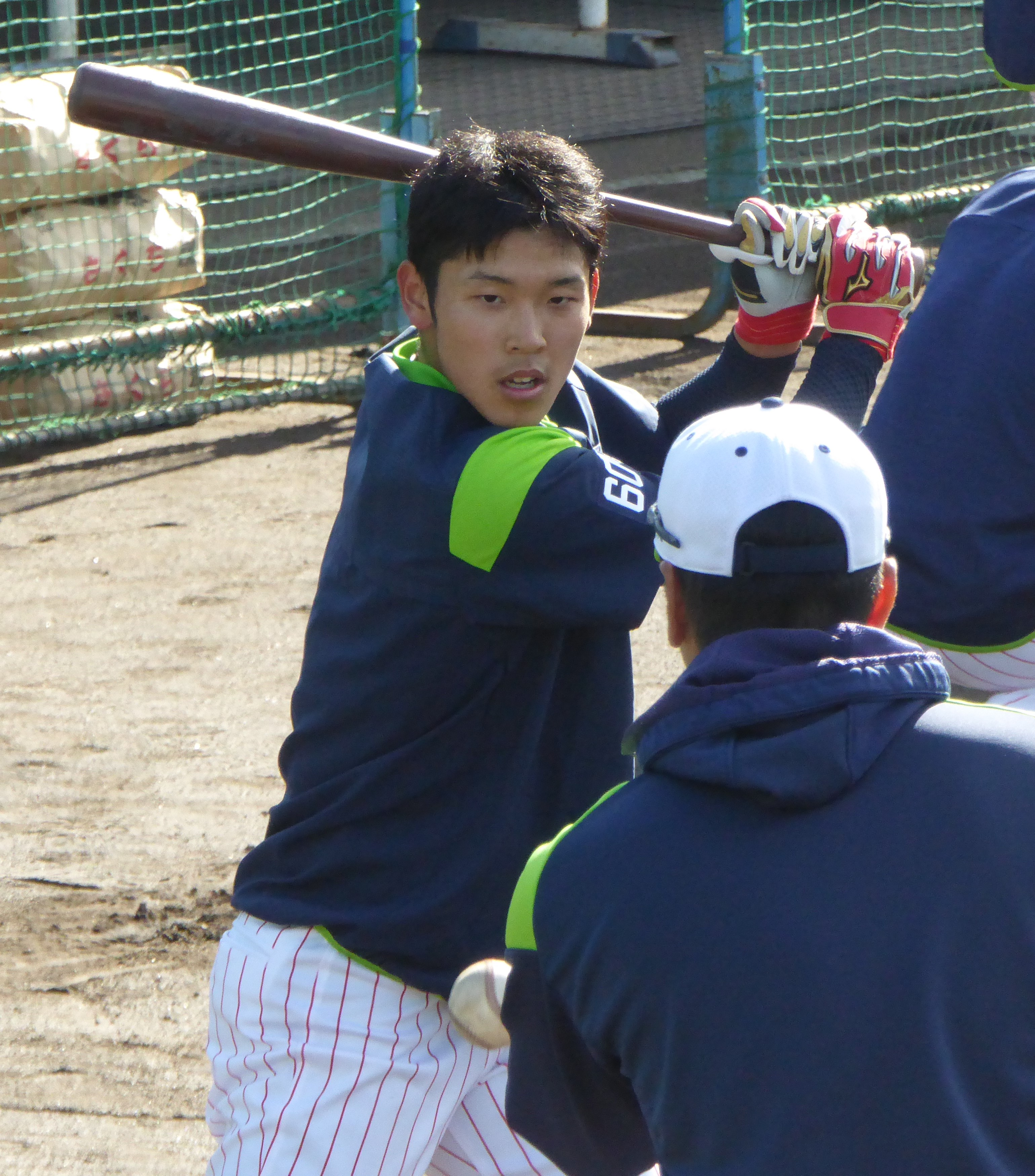

Tokyo Yakult Swallows – No. 60
- Infielder
- Born: May 28, 2001 (age 24); Yoshinogawa, Tokushima, Japan
- Bats: Left Throws: Right

NPB debut
- August 12, 2020, for the Tokyo Yakult Swallows

Career statistics (through 2025 season)
- Batting average: .208
- Hits: 88
- Home runs: 5
- RBIs: 25
- Stolen bases: 5
- Stats at Baseball Reference

Teams
- Tokyo Yakult Swallows (2020–present)

Ryusei Takeoka (武岡 龍世, Takeoka Ryusei; born May 28, 2001 in Yoshinogawa, Tokushima, Japan) is a professional Japanese baseball player. He plays infielder for the Tokyo Yakult Swallows.
