= Fujii-dera (Yoshinogawa) =

Buddhist temple in Japan

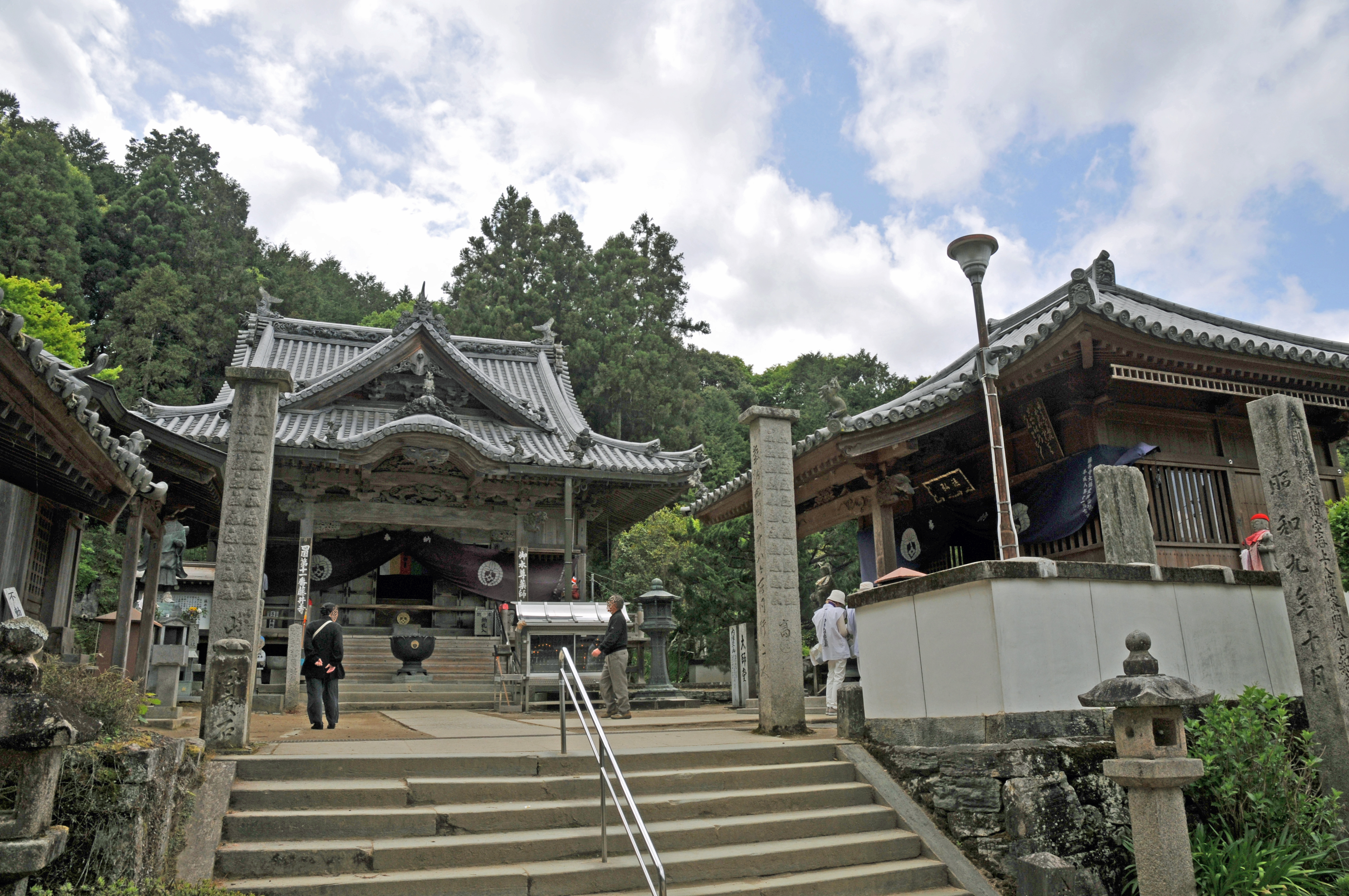

Religion
- Affiliation: Zen
- Deity: Bhaisajyaguru

Location
- Location: Yoshinogawa
- Country: Japan
- Interactive map of Fujii-dera
- Coordinates: 34°03′06″N 134°20′55″E

Architecture
- Founder: Kūkai
- Completed: 815

Fujii-dera (藤井寺) is a Zen Buddhist temple in Japan. It is the 11th site of the Shikoku Pilgrimage.

== History ==
In 815, Kūkai visited the area and built a temple to house a statue of Yakushi Nyorai. The nearby mountains were ravaged by the fires during the Tenshō period. In 1832, a fire destroyed most of the temple, the current building were finished in 1860. A Cloud Dragon design on the ceiling in the Main Hall of the temple was painted by a local artist in 1977.

== Yakushi Nyorai ==
A statue of Yakushi Nyorai in the temple is known for protection from disasters. The statue has always survived fires from the temple.
