= Kamojima Station =

Railway station in Yoshinogawa, Tokushima Prefecture, Japan

B09 Kamojima Station 鴨島駅
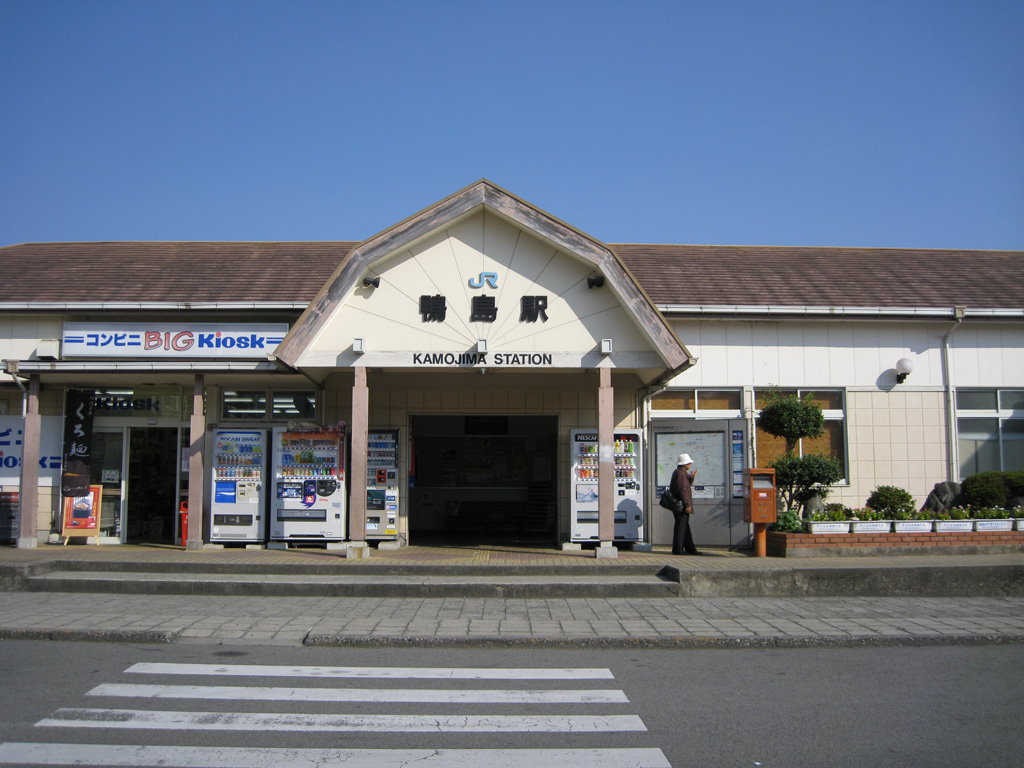
- Kamojima Station in 2008

General information
- Location: Kamojimacho Kamojima, Yoshinogawa-shi, Tokushima-ken 776-0010; Japan
- Coordinates: 34°04′26″N 134°21′22″E
- Operator: JR Shikoku
- Line: ■ Tokushima Line
- Distance: 50.0 km from Tsukuda
- Platforms: 2 side platforms
- Tracks: 2 + 2 sidings

Construction
- Structure type: At grade
- Parking: Available
- Accessible: No - platforms linked by footbridge

Other information
- Status: Staffed - JR ticket window
- Station code: B09
- Website: Official website

History
- Opened: 16 February 1899

Passengers
- FY2018: 1850
Location
- Location within Tokushima Prefecture Location within Japan

Kamojima Station (鴨島駅, Kamojima-eki) is a passenger railway station located in the city of Yoshinogawa, Tokushima Prefecture, Japan. It is operated by JR Shikoku and has the station number "B09".

== Lines ==
Kamojima Station is served by the Tokushima Line and is 50.0 km from the beginning of the line at Tsukuda. Besides local service trains, the Tsurugisan limited express service also stops at Kamojima.

== Layout ==
The station consists of two opposed side platforms serving 2 tracks. A passing loop runs on the other side of platform 2 while a siding runs on the other side of platform 1, ending near the station building. The station building houses a shop, waiting room, a JR ticket window (without a Midori no Madoguchi facility) and a JR travel centre (Warp Plaza). Access to the opposite platform is by means of an old-style roofed footbridge.

=== Platforms ===
1	■ Tokushima Line	for Anabuki and Awa-Ikeda
2	■ Tokushima Line	for Sako and Tokushima

== Adjacent stations ==
«	Service	»
JR Limited Express Services
Awa-Kawashima	Tsurugisan	Ishii
Tokushima Line
Nishi-Oe	Local	Oezuka

== History ==
The station was opened on 16 February 1899 by the privately run Tokushima Railway as the terminus of a line from Tokushima. It became a through-station on 19 August 1899 when the line was extended to Awa-Kawashima. When the company was nationalized on 1 September 1907, Japanese Government Railways (JGR) took over control of the station and operated it as part of the Tokushima Line (later the Tokushima Main Line). With the privatization of Japanese National Railways (JNR), the successor of JGR, on 1 April 1987, the station came under the control of JR Shikoku. On 1 June 1988, the line was renamed the Tokushima Line.

== Passenger statistics ==
In fiscal 2018, the station was used by an average of 1850 passengers daily.

== Surrounding area ==
The area around the station is the center of former Kamojima Town

- Yoshinogawa City Kamojima Elementary School
- Kamojima Health Center
- Yoshinogawa City Hall

== See also ==
- List of railway stations in Japan
