= Awa-Yamakawa Station =

Railway station in Yoshinogawa, Tokushima Prefecture, Japan

B14 Awa-Yamakawa Station 阿波山川駅
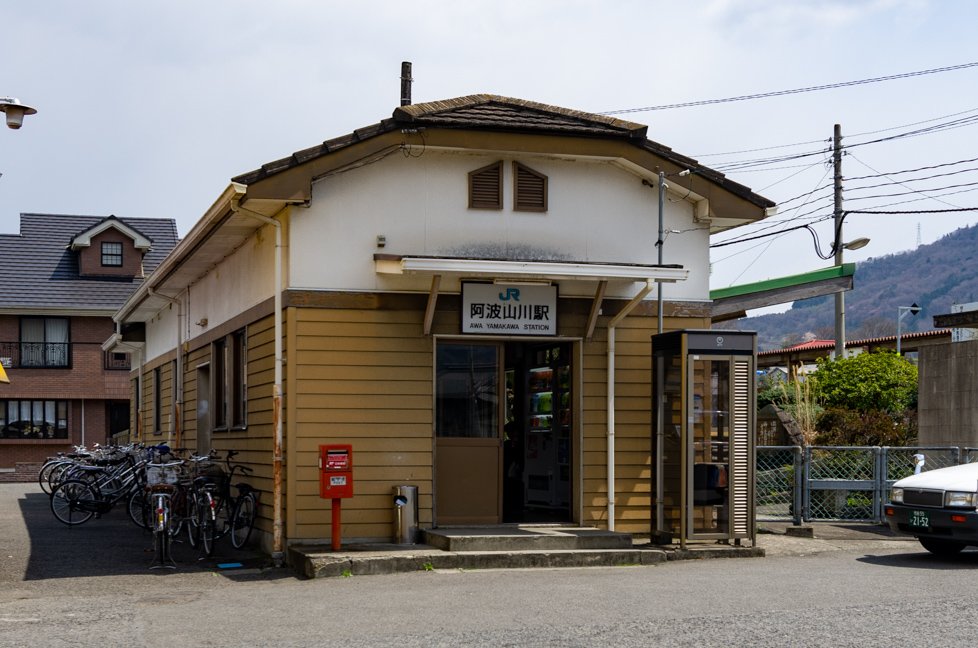
- Awa-Yamakawa Station in 2012

General information
- Location: Yamakawacho Yudate, Yoshinogawa-shi, Tokushima-ken 779-3404; Japan
- Coordinates: 34°03′18″N 134°14′03″E
- Operator: JR Shikoku
- Line: ■ Tokushima Line
- Distance: 37.7 km from Tsukuda
- Platforms: 1 side platform
- Tracks: 1

Construction
- Structure type: At grade

Other information
- Status: Unstaffed
- Station code: B14

History
- Opened: 7 August 1900
- Former names: Yudate Station (until 1 April 1957)

Passengers
- FY2014: 381
Location
- Location within Tokushima Prefecture Location within Japan

Awa-Yamakawa Station (阿波山川駅, Awa-Yamakawa-eki) is a passenger railway station located in the city of Yoshinogawa, Tokushima Prefecture, Japan. It is operated by JR Shikoku and has the station number "B14".

== Lines ==
Awa-Yamakawa Station is served by the Tokushima Line and is 37.7 km from the beginning of the line at Tsukuda. Besides local trains, trains of the Tsurugisan limited express service between Tokushima and Awa-Ikeda also stop at Awa-Yamakawa.

== Layout ==
The station consists of a side platform serving a single track. The station building is unstaffed and serves only as a waiting room. There are some steps at the entrance to the station building and a further flight of steps is needed to reach the platform, rendering the station inaccessible to wheelchair users.

== Adjacent stations ==
«	Service	»
JR Limited Express Services
Awa-Kawashima	Tsurugisan	Anabuki
Tokushima Line
Kawata	Local	Yamase

== History ==
The station was opened on 7 August 1900 as Yudate Station (湯立駅, Yudate-eki) by the privately run Tokushima Railway. It was an intermediate station along a track extension from Yamase to Kawada and Funato (both now closed). When the company was nationalized on 1 September 1907, Japanese Government Railways (JGR) took over control of the station and operated it as part of the Tokushima Line (later the Tokushima Main Line). On 1 April 1957, Japanese National Railways (JNR), the successor of JGR, changed the name of the station to Awa-Yamakawa. With the privatization of Japanese National Railways (JNR) on 1 April 1987, the station came under the control of JR Shikoku. On 1 June 1988, the line was renamed the Tokushima Line.

== Passenger statistics ==
In fiscal 2014, the station was used by an average of 381 passengers daily.

== Surrounding area ==
- Yoshinogawa City Yamakawa Government Building
- Yoshinogawa City Yamakawa Library
- Yoshinogawa City Yamakawa Junior High School

== See also ==
- List of railway stations in Japan
