= Anabuki Station =

Railway station in Mima, Tokushima Prefecture, Japan

B16 Anabuki Station 穴吹駅
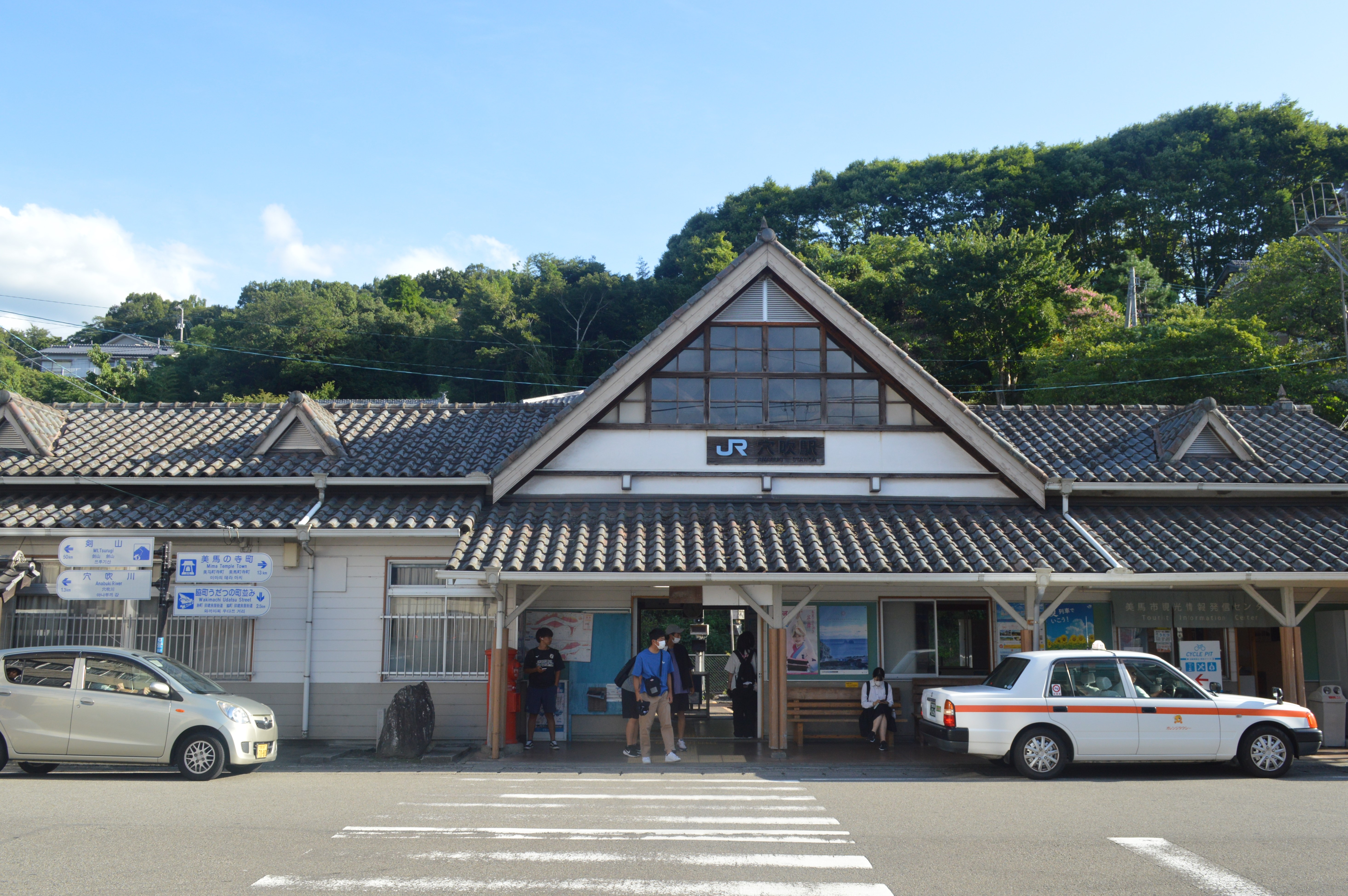
- Anabuki Station, 2022

General information
- Location: Iwade-1, Anabukichō Anabuki, Mima-shi, Tokushima-ken 777-0005; Japan
- Coordinates: 34°03′21″N 134°09′50″E
- Operator: JR Shikoku
- Line: ■ Tokushima Line
- Distance: 30.3 km from Tsukuda
- Platforms: 1 island platform
- Tracks: 2 + several sidings

Construction
- Structure type: At grade
- Parking: Available
- Accessible: Yes - island platform accessed by a level crossing and ramps

Other information
- Status: Staffed - JR ticket window (Midori no Madoguchi)
- Station code: B16
- Website: Official website

History
- Opened: 25 March 1914

Passengers
- FY2018: 1452
Location
- Location within Tokushima Prefecture Location within Japan

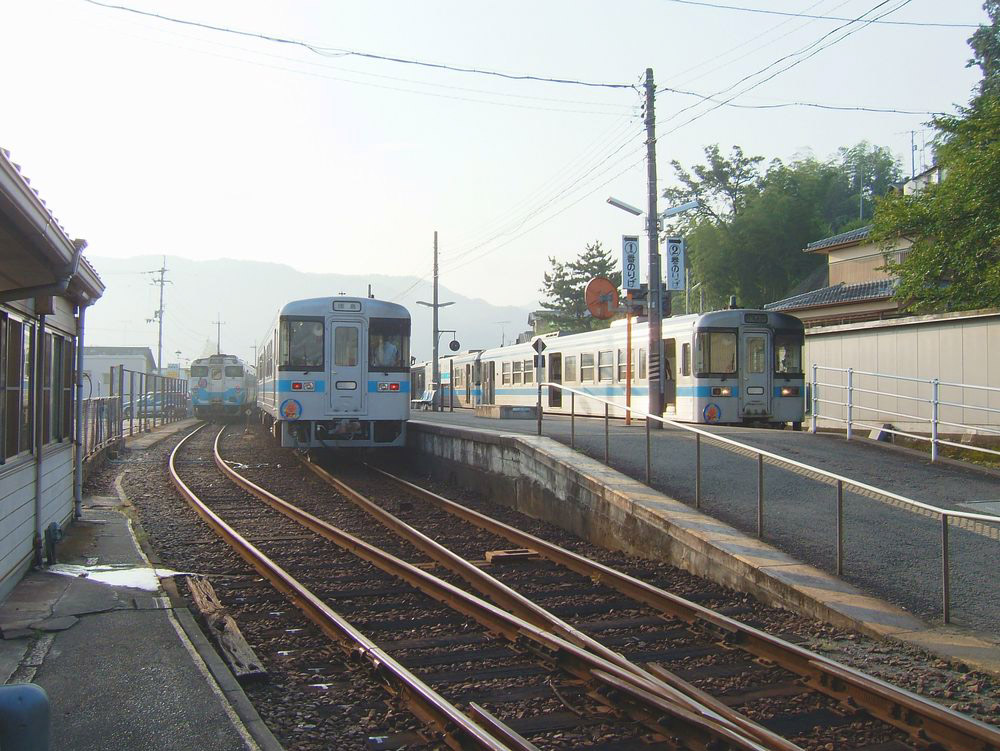
The platforms of Anabuki Station in 2007

Anabuki Station (穴吹駅, Anabuki-eki) is a passenger railway station located in the city of Mima, Tokushima Prefecture, Japan. It is operated by JR Shikoku and has the station number "B16".

== Lines ==
Anabuki Station is served by the Tokushima Line and is 30.3 km from the beginning of the line at Tsukuda. Besides local trains, the Tsurugisan limited express service also stops at Anabuki.

== Layout ==
The station consists of an island platform serving 2 tracks with sidings and passing loops branching off the tracks on either side. The station building is a large wooden structure with a tiled roof and houses a shop, waiting room, and a JR ticket window (with a Midori no Madoguchi facility). Some parking is available at the station. Access to the island platform is by means of a pedestrian level crossing.

=== Platforms ===
| 1 | ■ Tokushima Line | for Awa-Ikeda |
| 2 | ■ Tokushima Line | for Kamojima and Tokushima |

== Adjacent stations ==
| « | Service | » |
JR Limited Express Services
| Awa-Yamakawa | Tsurugisan | Sadamitsu |
Tokushima Line
| Kawata | Local | Oshima |

== History ==
Anabuki Station was opened on 25 March 1914 as one of several intermediate stations built when Japanese Government Railways (JGR) extended the track of the Tokushima Main Line from Awa-Yamakawa to Awa-Ikeda. With the privatization of Japanese National Railways (JNR), the successor to JGR, on 1 April 1987, Anabuki came under the control of JR Shikoku. On 1 June 1988, the line was renamed the Tokushima Line.

== Passenger statistics ==
In fiscal 2018, the station was used by an average of 1452 passengers daily.

== Surrounding area ==
- Tokushima Prefectural Anabuki High School
- Mima City Hall

== See also ==
- List of railway stations in Japan
