= Yoshino River =

River in Shikoku, Japan

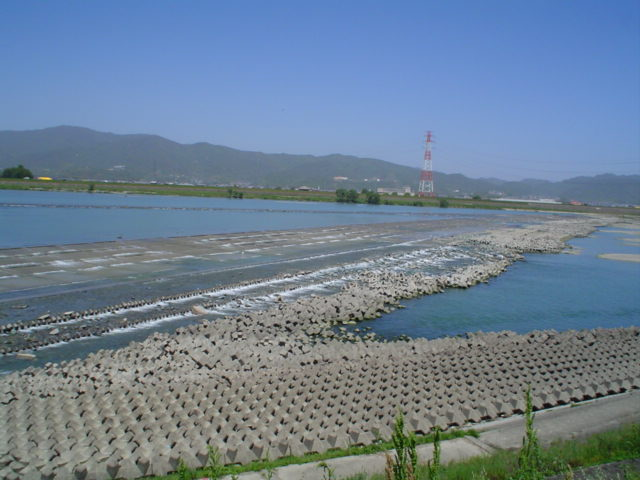
- Yoshino Daiju Dam

- Location within Japan
- Native name: 吉野川 (Japanese)

Location
- Country: Japan
- Prefectures: Kōchi, Tokushima

Physical characteristics
- Source: Mount Kamegamori
  - location: Kōchi
- Mouth: Kii Channel
  - location: Tokushima
  - coordinates: 34°04′43″N 134°36′03″E
  - elevation: 0m
- Length: 194 km (121 mi)

The Yoshino River (吉野川 Yoshino-gawa) is a Class A river on the island of Shikoku, Japan. It is 194 km (121 mi) long and has a watershed of 3,750 km^{2} (1,450 sq mi). It is the second longest river in Shikoku (slightly shorter than the Shimanto), and is the only river whose watershed spreads across all four prefectures of the island.

== Controversies ==
The river was the subject of controversy in January 2000 when around half of eligible local residents showed up to the polls and overwhelmingly voted against a proposed dam construction across the river, with 102,759 (90.14%) registering a "no" vote and only 9,367 (8.22%) giving a "yes" vote (1.64% of votes were deemed invalid). This was considered unusual in a country where pork barrel public works projects were common and often welcomed by locals in provincial areas. Ironically, one author has argued that because of earlier local reforms which required a 50% turnout rate for referendums to pass through, pro-dam lobbyists likely urged "yes" supporters to not turn out to vote in the hopes that the total turnout would be less than 50% and thus invalidate the inevitable "no" vote. The entire episode led to a heated struggle between opposed locals and pro-dam lobbyists over the project. Reconstruction of the Yoshino Daiju Dam (吉野川第十堰 Yoshino-gawa Daijūzeki) near its mouth provoked much controversy among environmentalists.
