= Japan National Route 192 =

Road in Japan

National Route 192
- 国道192号
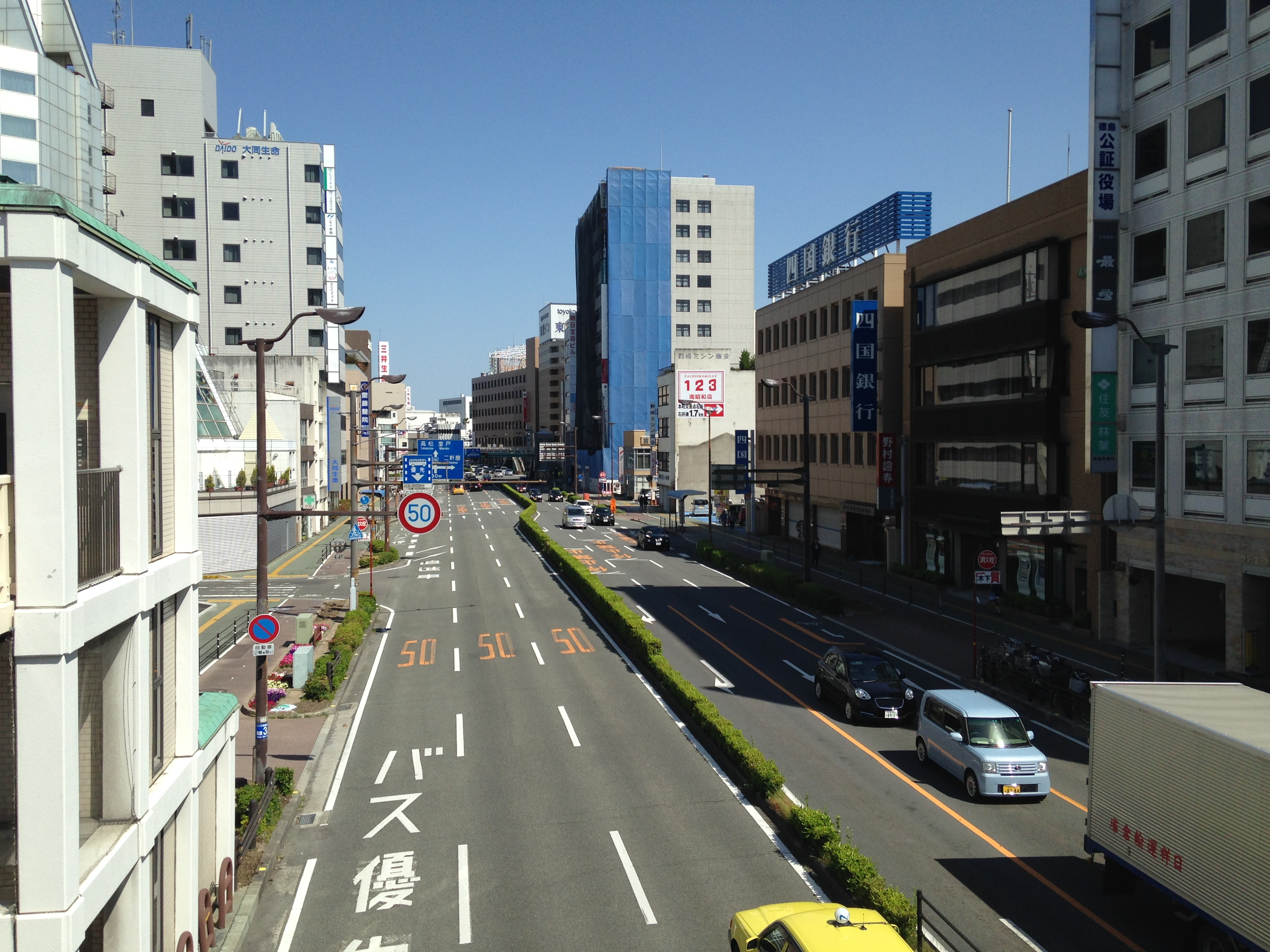

Route information
- Length: 138.3 km (85.9 mi)
- Existed: 18 May 1953–present

Major junctions
- West end: National Route 11 in Saijō
- East end: National Route 11 / National Route 28 in Tokushima

Location
- Country: Japan

Highway system
- National highways of Japan; Expressways of Japan
← National Route 191	→ National Route 193

National Route 192 is a national highway of Japan connecting Saijō and Tokushima in Japan, with a total length of 138.3 km (85.94 mi).
