= Awa-Ikeda Station =

Railway station in Miyoshi, Tokushima Prefecture, Japan

D22 B25 Awa-Ikeda Station 阿波池田駅
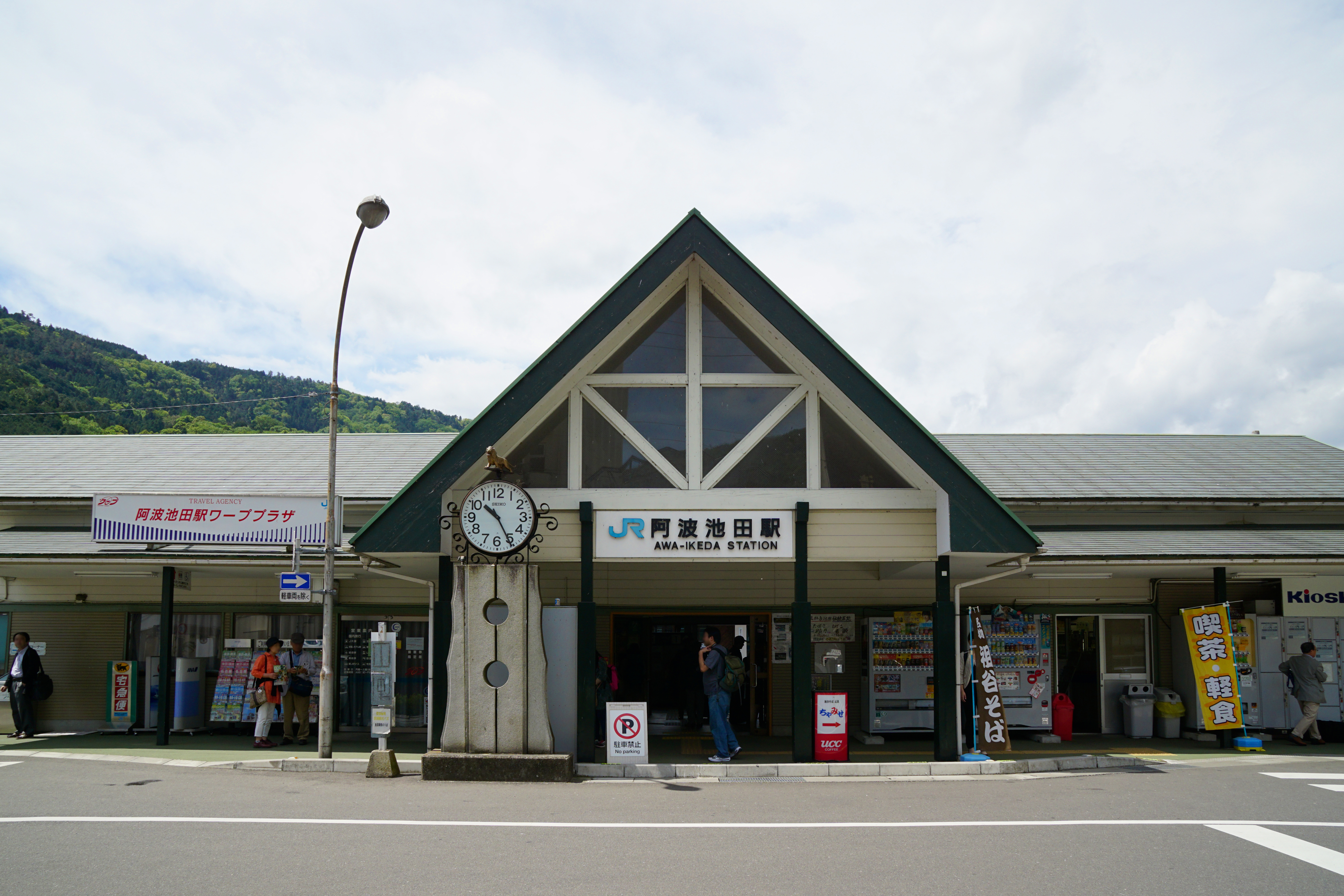
- Awa-Ikeda Station entrance and forecourt, May 2015

General information
- Location: 1840 Sarada, Ikeda-chō, Miyoshi-shi, Tokushima-ken 778-0003; Japan
- Coordinates: 34°01′37″N 133°48′17″E
- Operator: JR Shikoku
- Lines: Dosan Line; Tokushima Line
- Distance: 43.9 km (27.3 mi) from Tadotsu
- Platforms: 2 island + 1 side platform

Other information
- Status: Staffed ( "Midori no Madoguchi")
- Station code: B25; D22
- Website: Official website

History
- Opened: 25 March 1928; 98 years ago

Passengers
- FY2019: 776

Services
Preceding station	JR Shikoku	Following station
Minawa D23 towards Kubokawa	Dosan Line	Tsukuda D21 towards Tadotsu
Terminus	Tokushima Line	Tsukuda B24 towards Tokushima
Location
- Location within Tokushima Prefecture Location within Japan

Awa-Ikeda Station (阿波池田駅, Awa-Ikeda-eki) is a passenger railway station located in the city of Miyoshi, Tokushima, Japan, operated by JR Shikoku.

== Lines ==
Awa-Ikeda Station is served by the Dosan Line (D22) and is 43.9 kilometers form the starting point of the line at Tadotsu. Trains on the Tokushima Line (B25) running as a through service from Sako also use this station.

== Station layout ==
The station has two island platforms and one side platform, serving a total of five tracks. The platforms are connected by a footbridge. The station has a "Midori no Madoguchi" staffed ticket office.

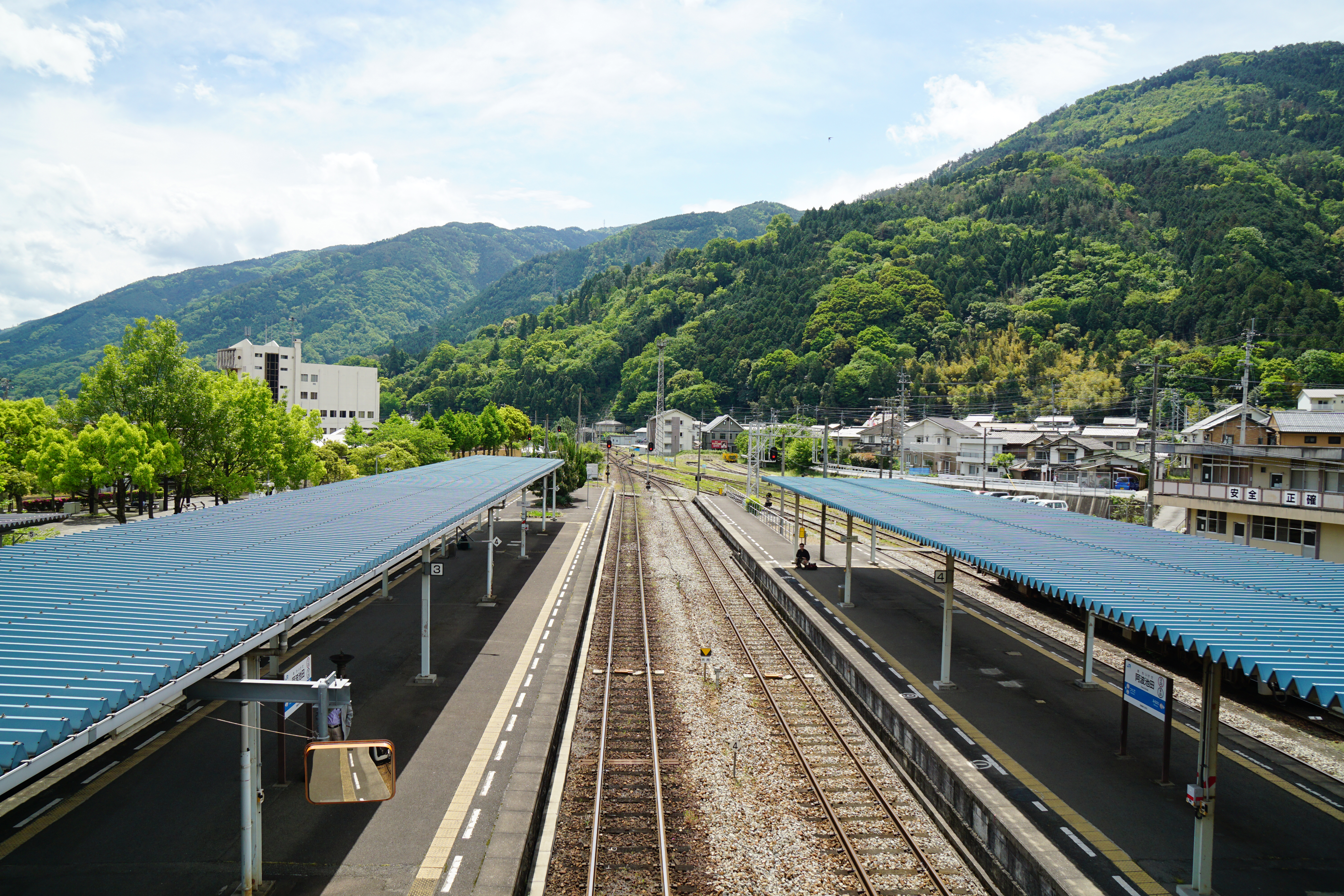
Platforms

== Adjacent stations ==
«	Service	»
Dosan Line
Tsukuda	Local	Minawa
Tokushima Line
Tsukuda	Local	Terminus
Awa-Kamo	Limited Express Tsurugisan	Terminus

== History ==
Awa-Ikeda Station opened on 25 March 1928. With the privatization of JNR on 1 April 1987, the station came under the control of JR Shikoku.

== Passenger statistics ==
In fiscal 2019, the station was used by an average of 776 passengers daily.

== Surrounding area ==
- Miyoshi City Hall
- Tokushima Prefectural Ikeda High School
- Hesokko Park

== See also ==
- List of railway stations in Japan
