= Tsukuda Station (Tokushima) =

Railway station in Miyoshi, Tokushima Prefecture, Japan

D21 B24 Tsukuda Station 佃駅
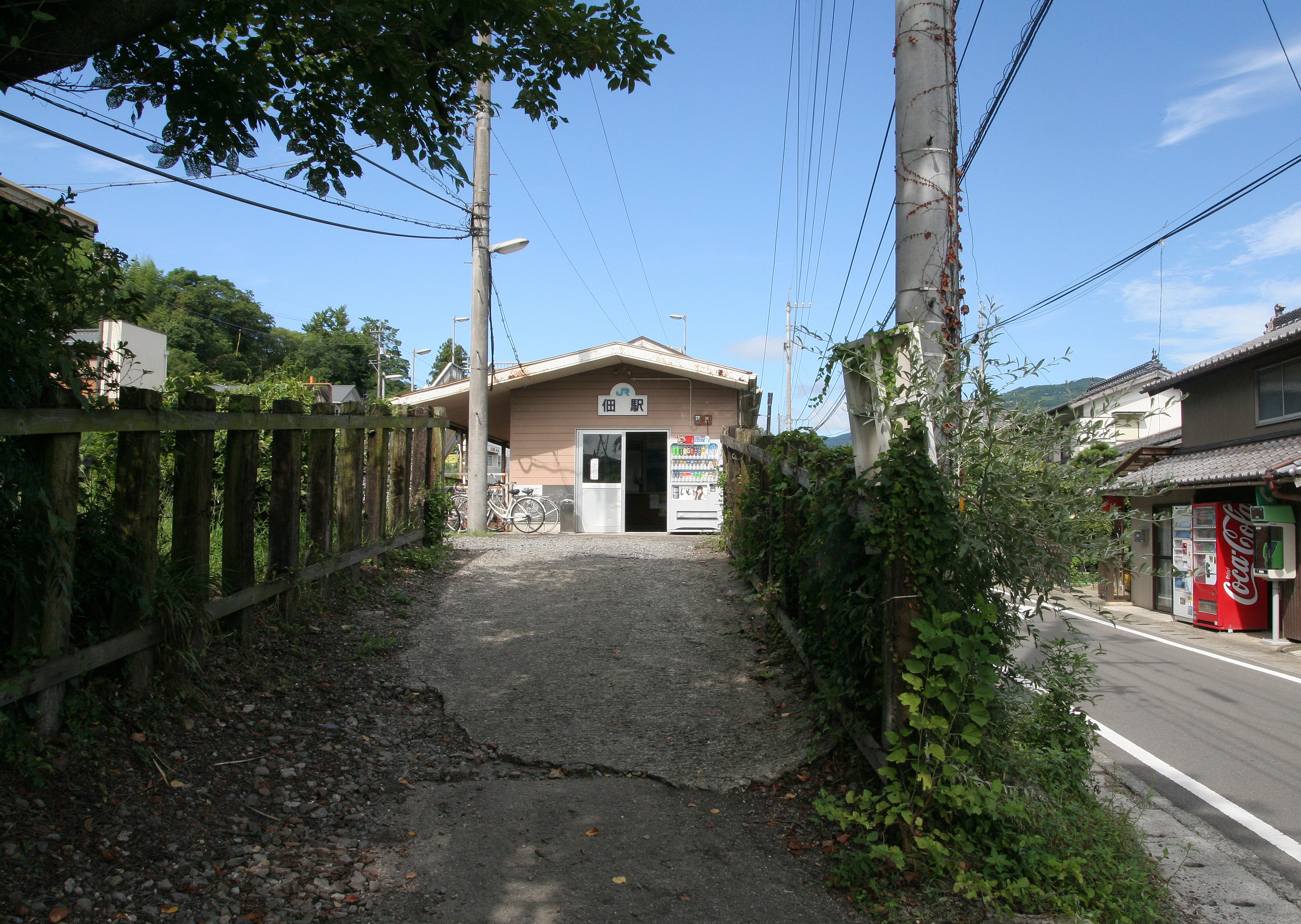
- Tsukuda Station entrance

General information
- Location: 1201 Ikawachō Nishiikawa, Miyoshi City, Tokushima Prefecture 779-4806; Japan
- Coordinates: 34°01′54″N 133°51′28″E
- Operator: JR Shikoku
- Lines: Dosan Line; Tokushima Line
- Distance: 76.7 km (47.7 mi) from Tadotsu (Dosan Line); 67.5 km (41.9 mi) from Sako (Tokushima Line)
- Platforms: 1 island platform
- Tracks: 2

Construction
- Structure type: At grade
- Accessible: No - overhead footbridge needed to access island platform

Other information
- Status: unstaffed
- Station code: D21; B24

History
- Opened: 10 January 1950; 76 years ago

Passengers
- FY2019: 38

Services
Preceding station	JR Shikoku	Following station
Awa-Ikeda D22 towards Kubokawa	Dosan Line	Hashikura D20 towards Tadotsu
Awa-Ikeda B25 Terminus	Tokushima Line	Tsuji B23 towards Tokushima
Location
- Location within Tokushima Prefecture Location within Japan

Tsukuda Station (佃駅, Tsukuda-eki) is a passenger railway station located in the city of Miyoshi, Tokushima Prefecture, Japan, operated by JR Shikoku.

== Lines ==
Tsukuda Stationis served by the following JR Shikoku lines:

- Dosan Line - as station number "D21", 76.7 km (47.7 mi) from the start of the line at Tadotsu ("D12").
- Tokushima Line - as station number "B24", 67.5 km (41.9 mi) from the start of the line at Sako ("B01"). On 18 July 1962, Tsukuda was designated the official end of the Tokushima Line but trains continue to run on the Dosan track to the next station at Awa-Ikeda.

Only local trains from both lines stop at the station.

== Layout ==
The station consists of an island platform serving two tracks. A small building on the side of the access road serves as a waiting room. An overhead footbridge gives access to the island platform which has a weather shelter.

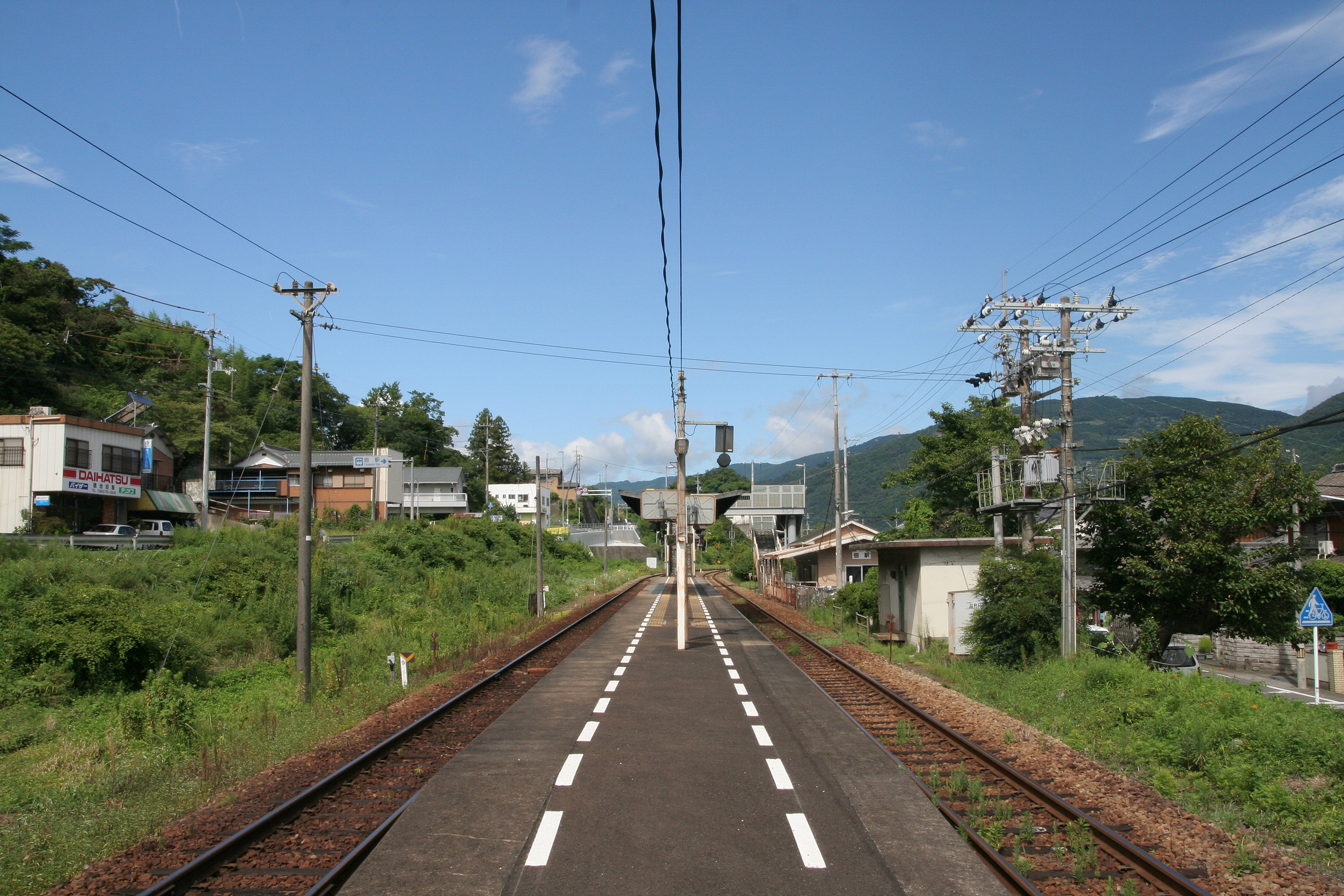
View of the station platform in 2006 looking in the direction of Tadotsu.

== Adjacent stations ==
«	Service	»
Tokushima Line
Limited Express Tsurugisan: Does not stop at this station

== History ==
Tsukuda Signalbox (佃信号場) was established on 28 April 1929 as a junction between the Tokushima Line and the Sanyo Line (now Dosan Line) which had been extended southwards from Sanuki-Saida. On 10 January 1950, it was upgraded as Tsukuda Station and passenger services commenced. At this time the station was operated by Japanese National Railways (JNR). With the privatization of JNR on 1 April 1987, control of the station passed to JR Shikoku.

== Passenger statistics ==
In fiscal 2019, the station was used by an average of 38 passengers daily

== Surrounding area ==
- Yoshino River
- Japan National Route 192

== See also ==
- List of railway stations in Japan
