= List of cities in Tokushima Prefecture by population =

The following list sorts all cities (including towns and villages) in the Japanese prefecture of Tokushima with a population of more than 5,000 according to the 2020 Census. As of October 1, 2020, 21 places fulfill this criterion and are listed here. This list refers only to the population of individual cities, towns and villages within their defined limits, which does not include other municipalities or suburban areas within urban agglomerations.

== List ==
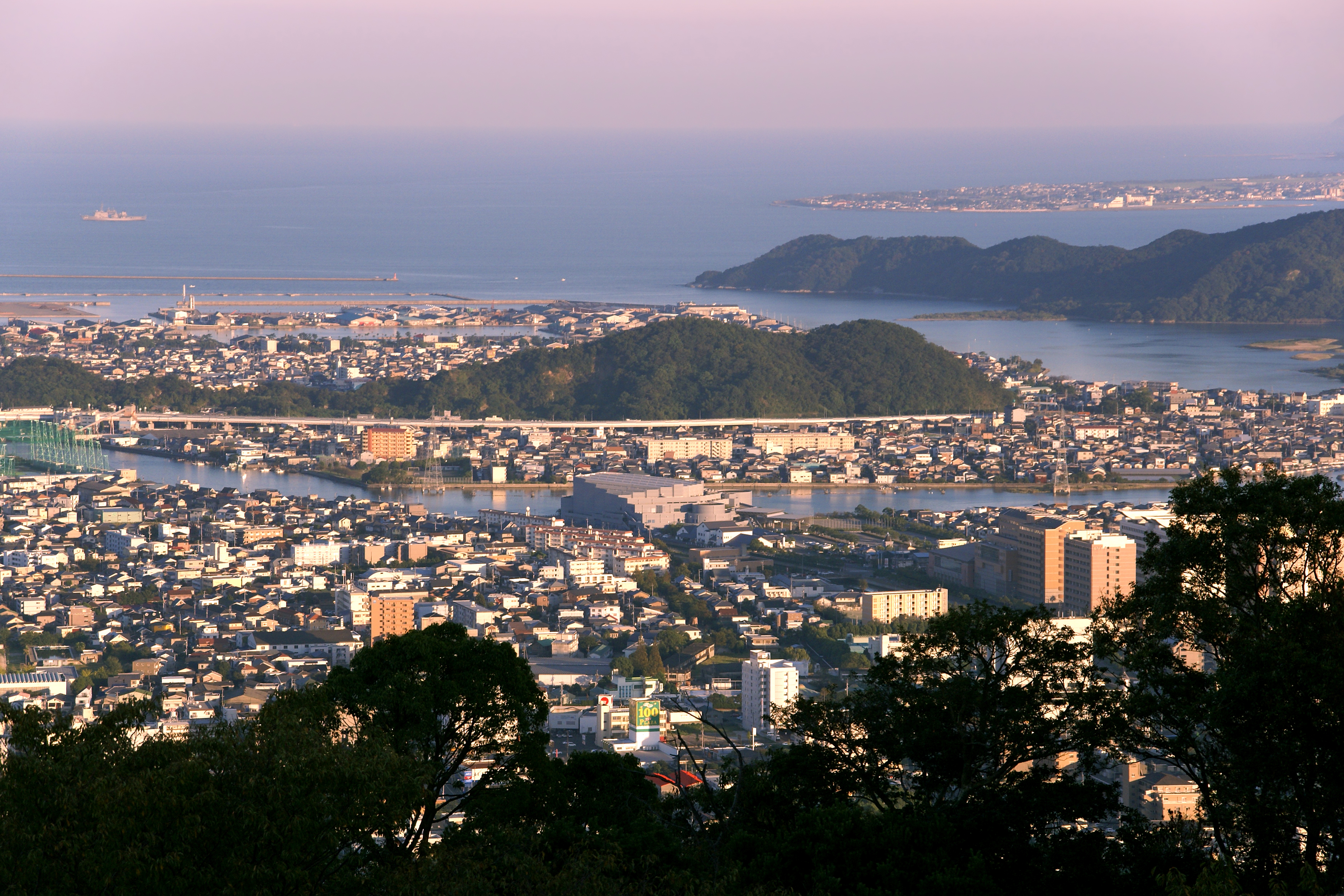
Tokushima

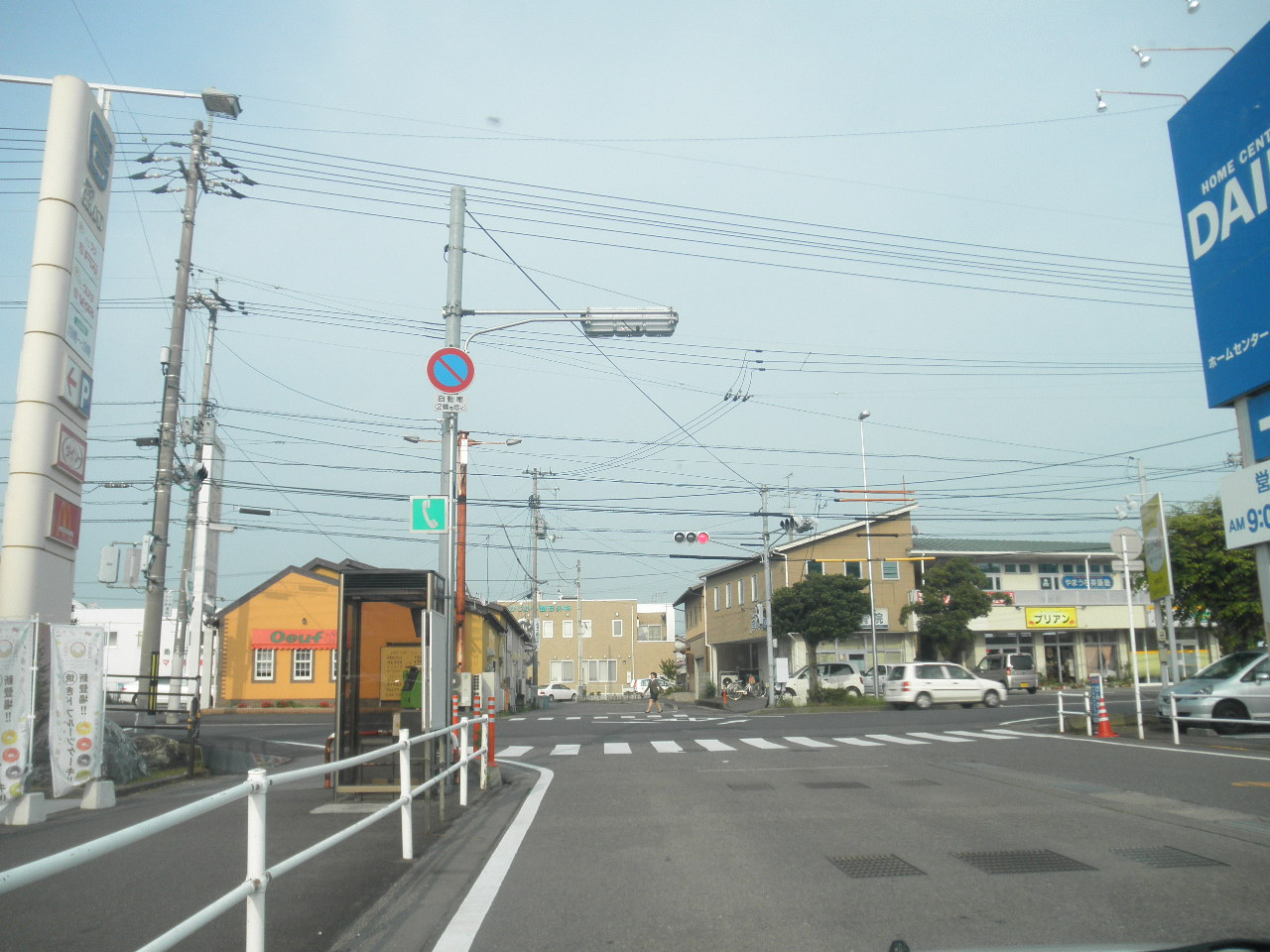
Anan

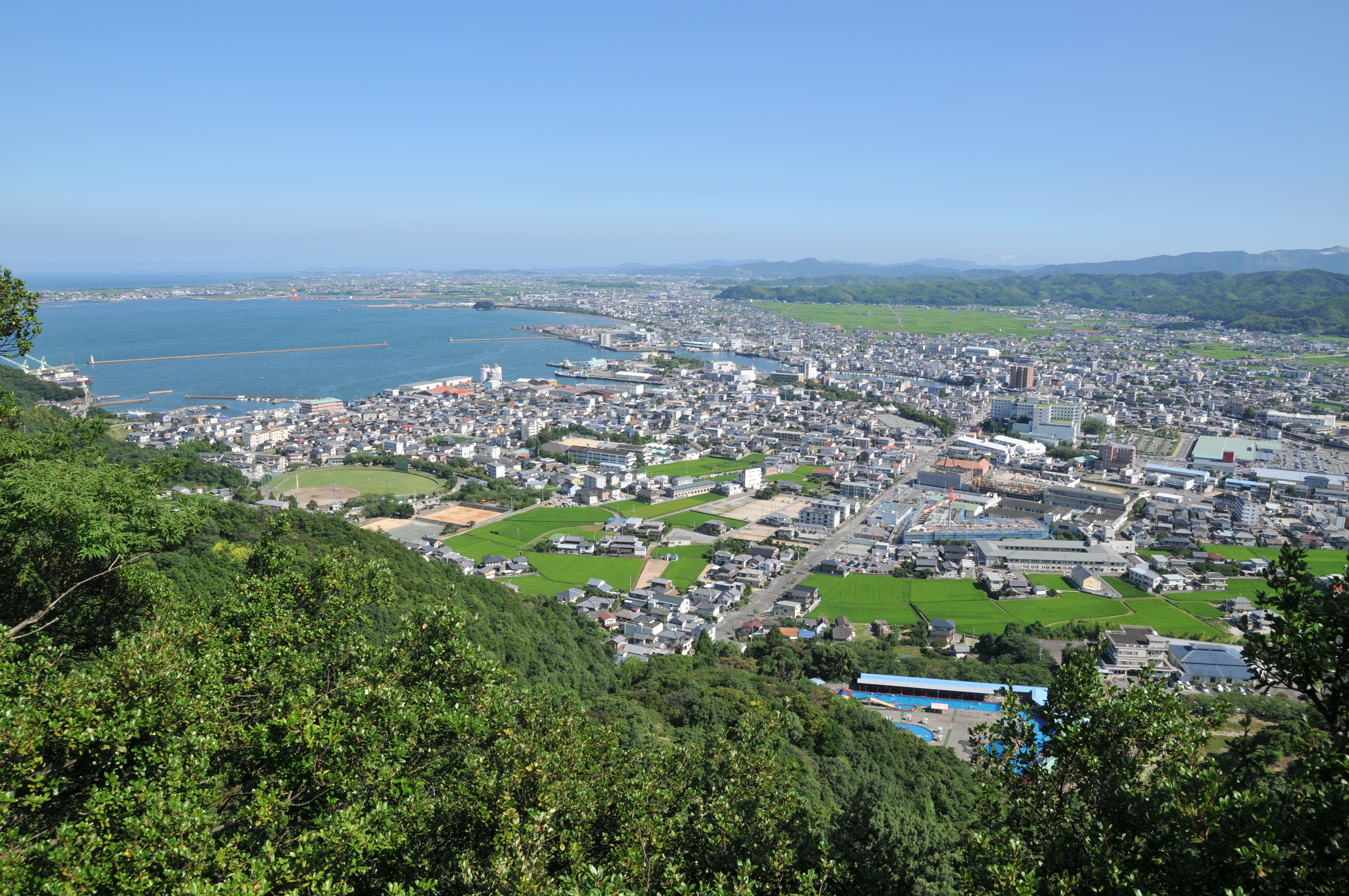
Komatsushima

The following table lists the 19 cities, villages and towns in Tokushima with a population of at least 5,000 on October 1, 2020, according to the 2020 Census. The table also gives an overview of the evolution of the population since the 1995 census.

Rank (2020)	Name	Status	2020	2015	2010	2005	2000	1995
1	Tokushima	City	252,364	258,554	264,548	267,833	268,218	268,706
2	Anan	City	69,519	73,019	76,063	78,002	78,971	79,479
3	Naruto	City	54,664	59,101	61,513	63,200	64,620	64,923
4	Yoshinogawa	City	38,783	41,466	44,020	45,782	46,794	48,383
5	Komatsushima	City	36,191	38,755	40,614	42,115	43,078	43,349
6	Aizumi	Town	35,255	34,626	33,338	32,286	30,368	28,408
7	Awa	City	34,761	37,202	39,247	41,076	42,388	42,657
8	Mima	City	28,094	30,501	32,484	34,565	36,632	38,202
9	Ishii	Town	24,859	25,590	25,954	26,068	26,023	25,436
10	Miyoshi	City	23,608	26,836	29,951	34,103	37,305	40,087
11	Kitajima	Town	22,777	22,446	21,658	20,703	19,823	19,514
12	Matsushige	Town	14,582	15,204	15,070	14,926	14,267	13,562
13	Higashimiyoshi	Town	13,576	14,638	15,044	15,626	16,199	15,993
14	Itano	Town	13,054	13,358	14,241	14,519	14,637	13,999
15	Kamiita	Town	11,269	12,039	12,727	13,123	12,952	12,721
16	Kaiyō	Town	8,363	9,283	10,446	11,507	12,104	12,399
17	Tsurugi	Town	7,723	8,927	10,490	11,722	13,100	14,614
18	Naka	Town	7,370	8,402	9,318	10,695	11,893	12,572
19	Minami	Town	6,217	7,092	7,765	8,726	9,307	9,928
