= Awa District, Tokushima =

Former district of Tokushima prefecture, Japan

Awa (阿波郡, Awa-gun) was a district located in Tokushima Prefecture, Japan.

As of 2003, the district had an estimated population of 24,959 and a density of 206.20 persons per km^{2}. The total area is 121.04 km^{2}.

== Towns and villages ==
- Awa
- Ichiba

== Merger ==
- On April 1, 2005, the former town of Awa absorbed the town of Ichiba, along with the towns of Donari and Yoshino (both from Itano District) to create the city of Awa. Therefore, Awa District was dissolved as a result of this merger.
