= Ichiba, Tokushima =

Dissolved municipality in Tokushima prefecture, Japan

Ichiba (市場町, Ichiba-chō) was a town located in Awa District, Tokushima Prefecture, Japan.

As of 2003, the town had an estimated population of 11,556 and a density of 159.48 persons per km^{2}. The total area was 72.46 km^{2}.

On April 1, 2005, Ichiba, along with the towns of Awa (former) (also from Awa District), and the towns of Donari and Yoshino (both from Itano District), was merged to create the city of Awa.
