= Donari, Tokushima =

Dissolved municipality in Tokushima prefecture, Japan

Donari (土成町, Donari-chō) was a town located in Itano District, Tokushima Prefecture, Japan.

As of 2003, the town had an estimated population of 8,255 and a density of 145.82 persons per km^{2}. The total area was 56.61 km^{2}.

On April 1, 2005, Donari, along with the towns of Awa (former) and Ichiba (both from Awa District), and the town of Yoshino (also from Itano District), was merged to create the city of Awa.
