= Yoshino, Tokushima =

Dissolved municipality in Tokushima prefecture, Japan

Yoshino (吉野町, Yoshino-chō) was a town located in Itano District, Tokushima Prefecture, Japan.

As of 2003, the town had an estimated population of 8,397 and a density of 630.41 persons per km^{2}. The total area was 13.32 km^{2}.

On April 1, 2005, Yoshino, along with the towns of Awa (former) and Ichiba (both from Awa District), and the town of Donari (also from Itano District), was merged to create the city of Awa.
