= List of Intangible Cultural Properties of Japan (Tokushima) =

This list is of the Intangible Cultural Properties of Japan in the Prefecture of Tokushima.

== National Cultural Properties ==
As of 1 February 2015, zero Important Intangible Cultural Properties have been designated.

== Prefectural Cultural Properties ==
As of 12 February 2015, six properties have been designated at a prefectural level.

Property	Holder	Comments	Image	Ref.
Awa True Indigo-dyed Shijira-ori Weaving Technique 阿波しじら織; Awa shō-aizome shijira-ori	Inoue Kaikei (井上光雄), Katō Teruo (加藤輝男), Nagao Tōtarō (長尾藤太郎)			
Awa True Indigo Method 阿波正藍染法; Awa shō-aizome-hō	Okamoto Cloth Weaving Workshop (岡本織布工場)			
Hand-made Washi Production Technique 手漉和紙製造の技法 tesuki washi seizō no gihō	Fujimori Minoru (藤森実)			
Awa Indigo Natural Fermentation with Lye 阿波藍による灰汁自然発酵建による藍染; Awa ai ni yoru aku shizen hakkō date ni yoru aizome	Takeuchi Akiko (竹内晃子)			
Awa-tafu Mulberry Cloth Production Technique 阿波太布製造技法; Awa-tafu seizō gihō	Awa-tafu Production Technique Preservation Society (阿波太布製造技法保存伝承会)			
Swordsmithing 刀剣製作 tōken seisaku	Sugiyama Toshio (杉山俊雄)			

== Municipal Cultural Properties ==
As of 1 May 2014, five properties have been designated at a municipal level, including:

Property	Holder	Comments	Image	Ref.
Awa Indigo Chūsen Dyeing Technique 阿波藍の注染; Awa ai no chūsen	Furushō Toshiharu (古庄紀治)	Cultural Property of Tokushima		

== See also ==
- Cultural Properties of Japan
- Awa Odori
