= Ōasayama Prefectural Natural Park =

Natural park of Tokushima prefecture, Japan

- 大麻山県立自然公園
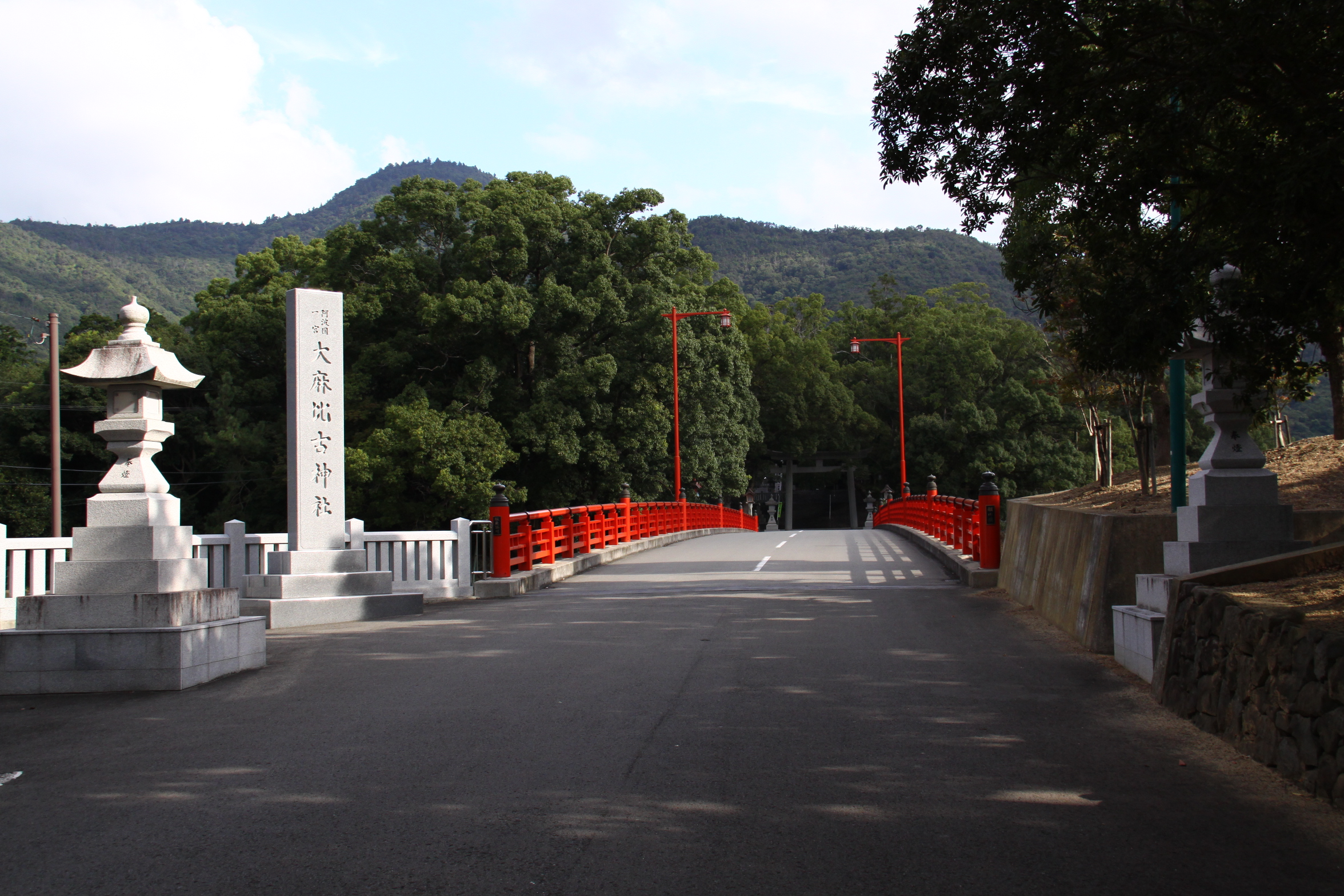
- Ōasahiko Jinja

- Location within Tokushima Prefecture Location within Japan
- Location: Tokushima Prefecture, Japan
- Coordinates: 34.2°N 134.5°E
- Area: 13.09 km^{2} (5.05 sq mi)
- Established: 1 January 1967

Ōasayama Prefectural Natural Park (大麻山県立自然公園, Ōasayama kenritsu shizen kōen) is a Prefectural Natural Park in Naruto, Tokushima Prefecture, Japan. Established in 1967, the park encompasses Mount Ōasa (大麻山) and Ōasahiko Shrine.

== See also ==
- National Parks of Japan
