= Mount Bizan =

Mountain in Japan

- 眉山
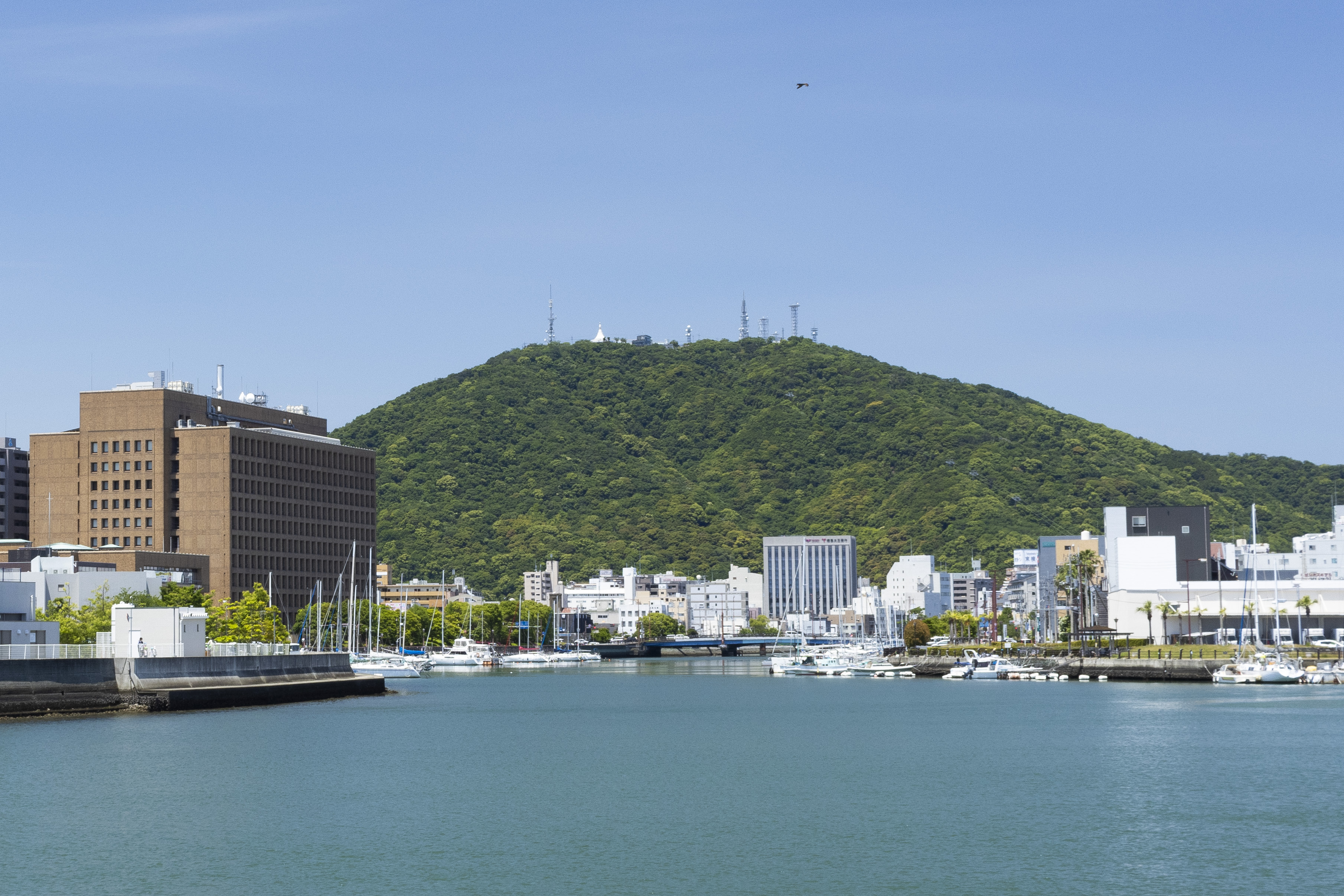

Highest point
- Elevation: 280 m (920 ft)
- Coordinates: 34°3′39″N 134°31′1″E

Naming
- English translation: eyebrow mountain
- Language of name: Japanese

Geography
- Location: Tokushima, Tokushima, Japan

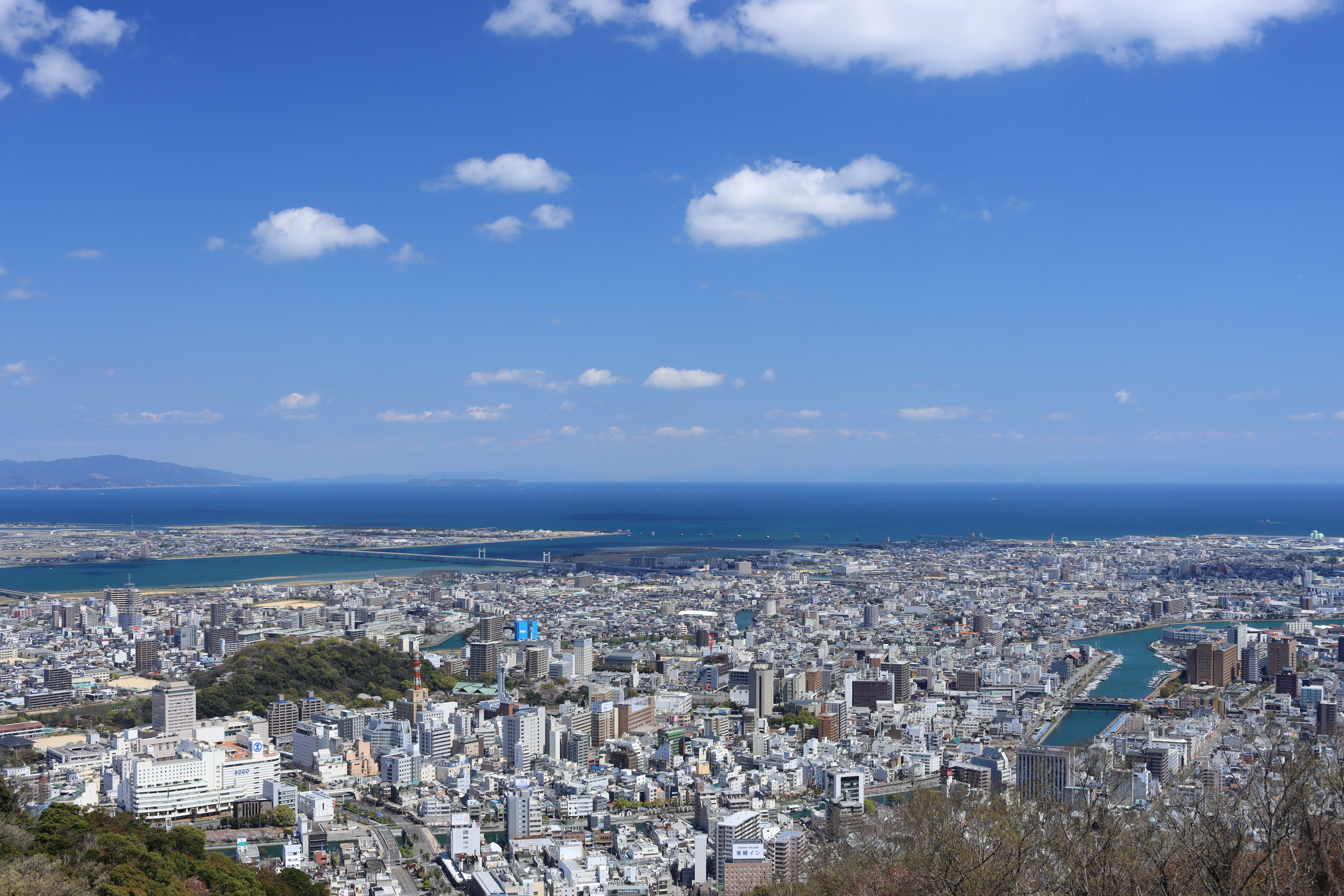
Tokushima City view from Mount Bizan

Mount Bizan (眉山, Bizan) is a mountain in the city of Tokushima in Tokushima Prefecture. The mountain's name is written with the characters for eyebrow and mountain. Bizan is said to have earned this name because the mountain resembles the contures of an eyebrow from all directions. Regarded as a symbol of Tokushima City, the name Mount Bizan appears in many school songs in the city district, such as the Tokushima Prefectural Jonan High School, Tokushima Municipal High School and many more.

== Geography ==
Mount Bizan is located in the middle of Tokushima City, and widely recognized as the landmark of the city. It is also a well known area for cherry blossom viewing, and offers an almost 360 degree view of the surrounding area from its peak. On a clear day Awaji Island to the northeast is visible, in addition to Wakayama Prefecture on the main Japanese island of Honshu, across the Kii Strait. The mountain offers nighttime views of the city. The slopes of the mountain are home to several shrines and temples, and the peak has several tourist facilities, including a Burmese-style pagoda to honor fallen soldiers from World War II.

Despite earning a certain amount of fame from a national movie of the same name, the famous Wada no Ya store that used to stand at the mountain's peak was moved down to the Awa Odori Kaikan Hall, and even today there is only a single small restaurant on top of the mountain. In 2007 Mount Bizan was the setting of a film of the same name, based on a book by Sada Masashi. It was expected that the film might bring more visitors to the area and lead to more development.

== Broadcasting stations ==
The area on top of Mt. Bizan is home to several broadcasting stations, including NHK Tokushima, Shikoku Hoso, and FM Tokushima. The signals broadcast from here reach mainly into the Yoshino River Basin area, out across the waters to Hyōgo Prefecture and Wakayama Prefecture and many other local areas. The area is also used as a broadcasting area for community radio stations such as FM Bizan, as well as digital TV.

== Bizan Ropeway ==
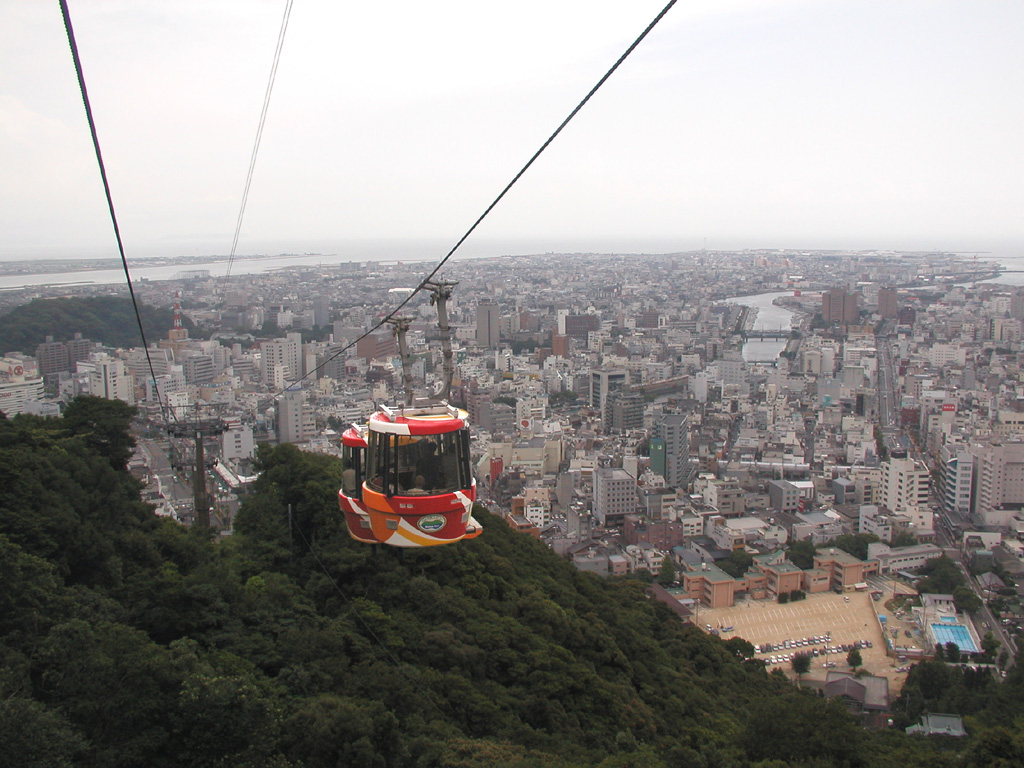
Bizan Ropeway

The Bizan Ropeway (眉山ロープウェイ, Bizan Rōpuwei) is an aerial lift that provides access to the top of Mount Bizan. It is the only line Tokushima City Tourist Association (徳島市観光協会, Tokushima-shi Kankō Kyōkai) operates, while the public company also operates Awa Odori Kaikan, a museum devoted to Awa Dance. The ropeway departs from the 5th floor of the museum. The line opened in 1957.

Statistics:

- Distance: 787 metres (2,582 ft)
- Vertical interval: 242 metres (794 ft)
- Operational speed: 4 metres per second (13 ft/s)
- Passenger capacity per a cabin: 15
- Cabins: 2

== See also ==
- Tokushima City
- Tokushima Radio
- NHK Tokushima
- Shikoku Hoso
