= Awa Odori Kaikan =

Museum in Tokushima, Japan

Coordinates: 34°04′13″N 134°32′42″E

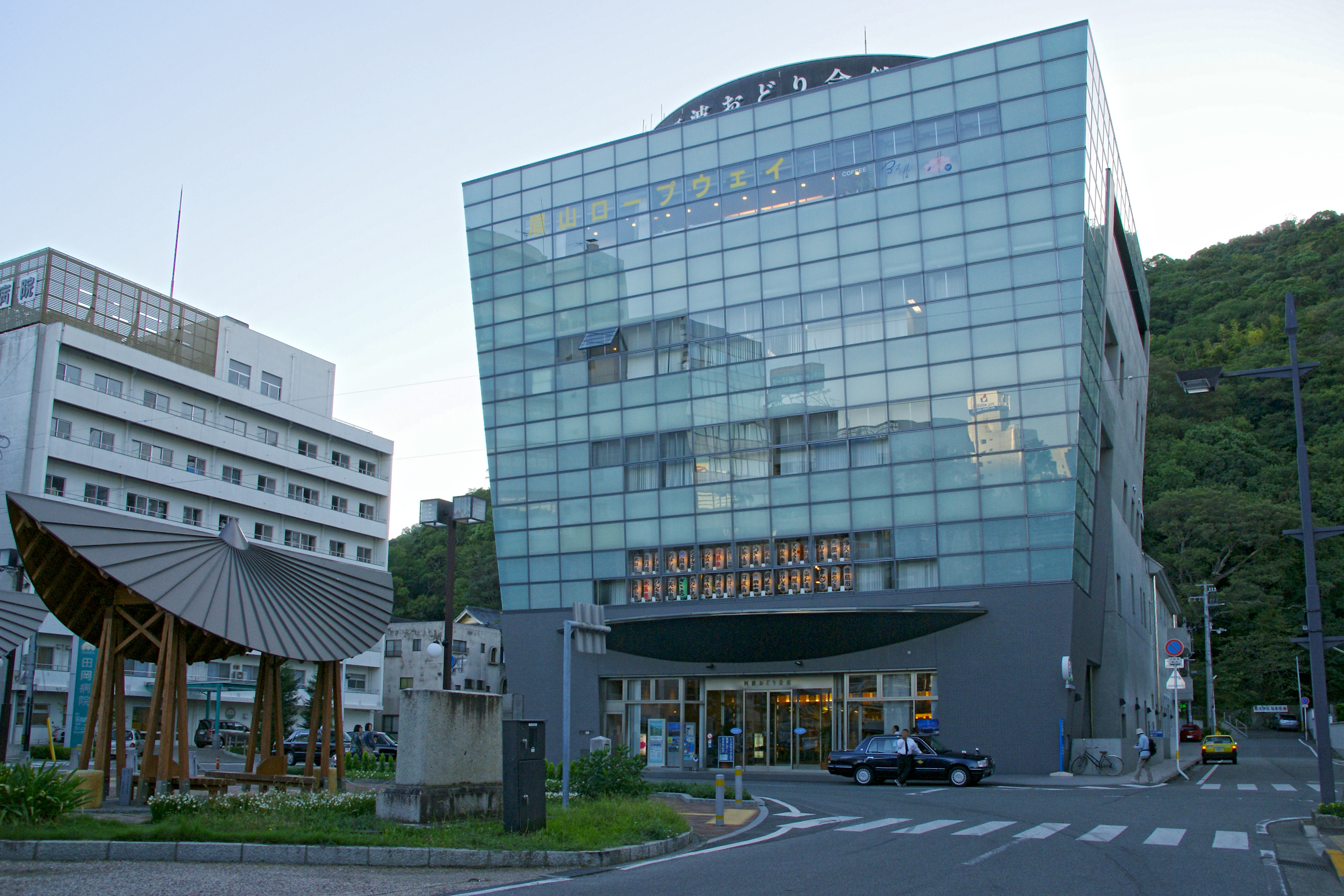

The Awa Odori Hall (阿波おどり会館, Awa Odori Kaikan) is a museum in the city of Tokushima where visitors can learn about Awa Odori, watch displays of the dance and sample local products. It is located at the base of the 280m-high Mount Bizan. The hall also acts as a gateway to neighboring Mount Bizan with the location of a ropeway station on Level five.

The building has a gift shop on its ground floor. The museum is on the third floor. Also located in the building is the hall where four daily shows of the Awa Odori are performed. The last of the shows, which begins in the late evening, is slightly more expensive than the others. One unique feature of the performances is the participation of audience members.

Until 1990, it was home to the Tokushima Prefectural Art Museum.

== Layout ==
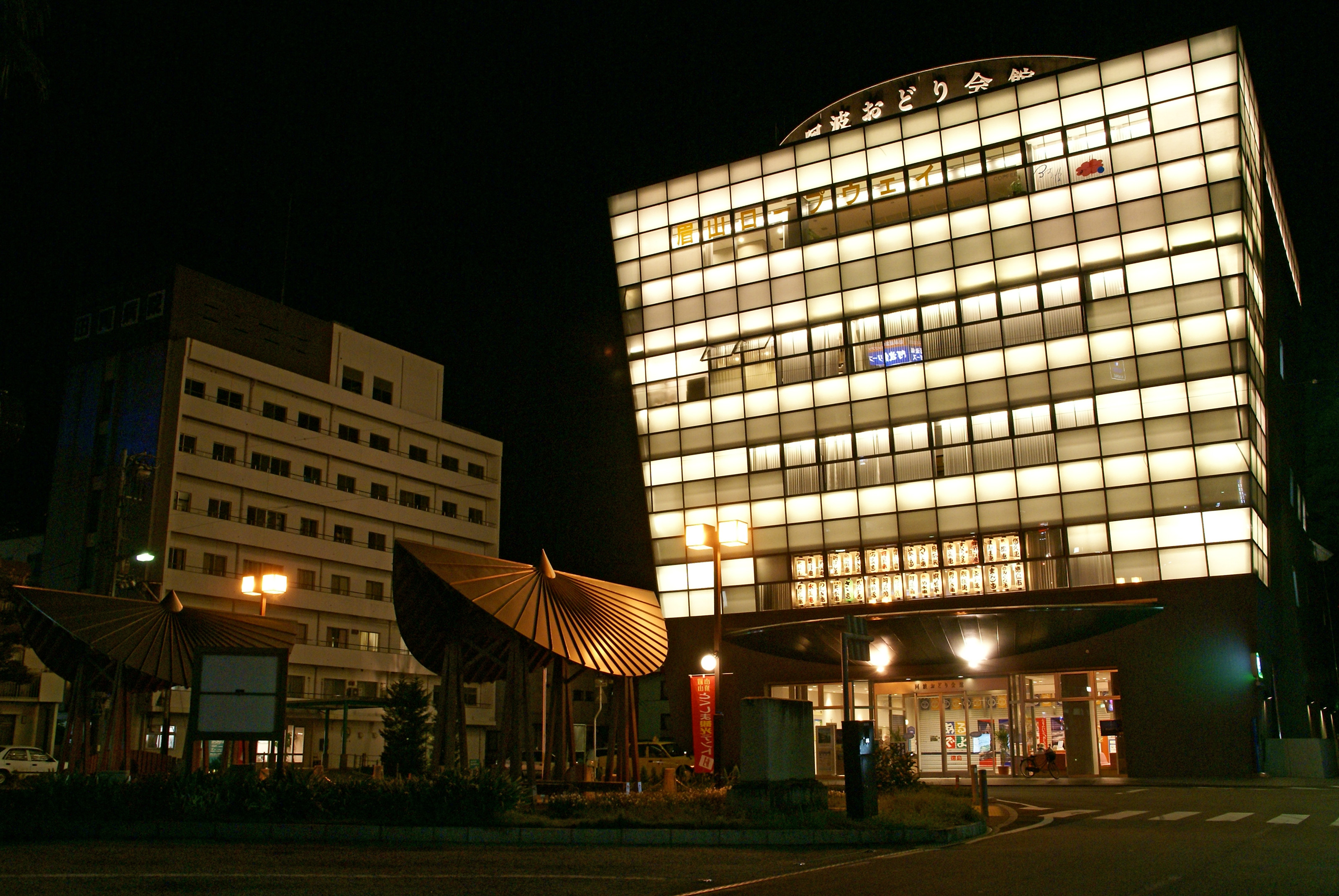

Level 1 The first floor of the hall is home to the information desk, with pamphlets and videos showing tourist information about Tokushima, and the "Arudeyo Tokushima" store with tourist goods, local produce and much more.

Level 2 The second floor is home to a dance stage that is open to performances throughout the day.

In addition to the dance hall, the second floor is also home to a library containing information relevant to the dance. Use of the library is free.

Level 3 The third level of the hall is home to an Awa Odori museum, where visitors can see clothing, instruments, and other items related to the dance. There is also an area where you can try dancing yourself, along with video instructions.

Level 4 The fourth level is an open area with rooms that can be rented for meetings, dance practice and other purposes.

Level 5 The fifth level of the hall is home to a small restaurant, and a ropeway station for those wanting to climb Mt. Bizan via cable car.

== Bicycle rental ==
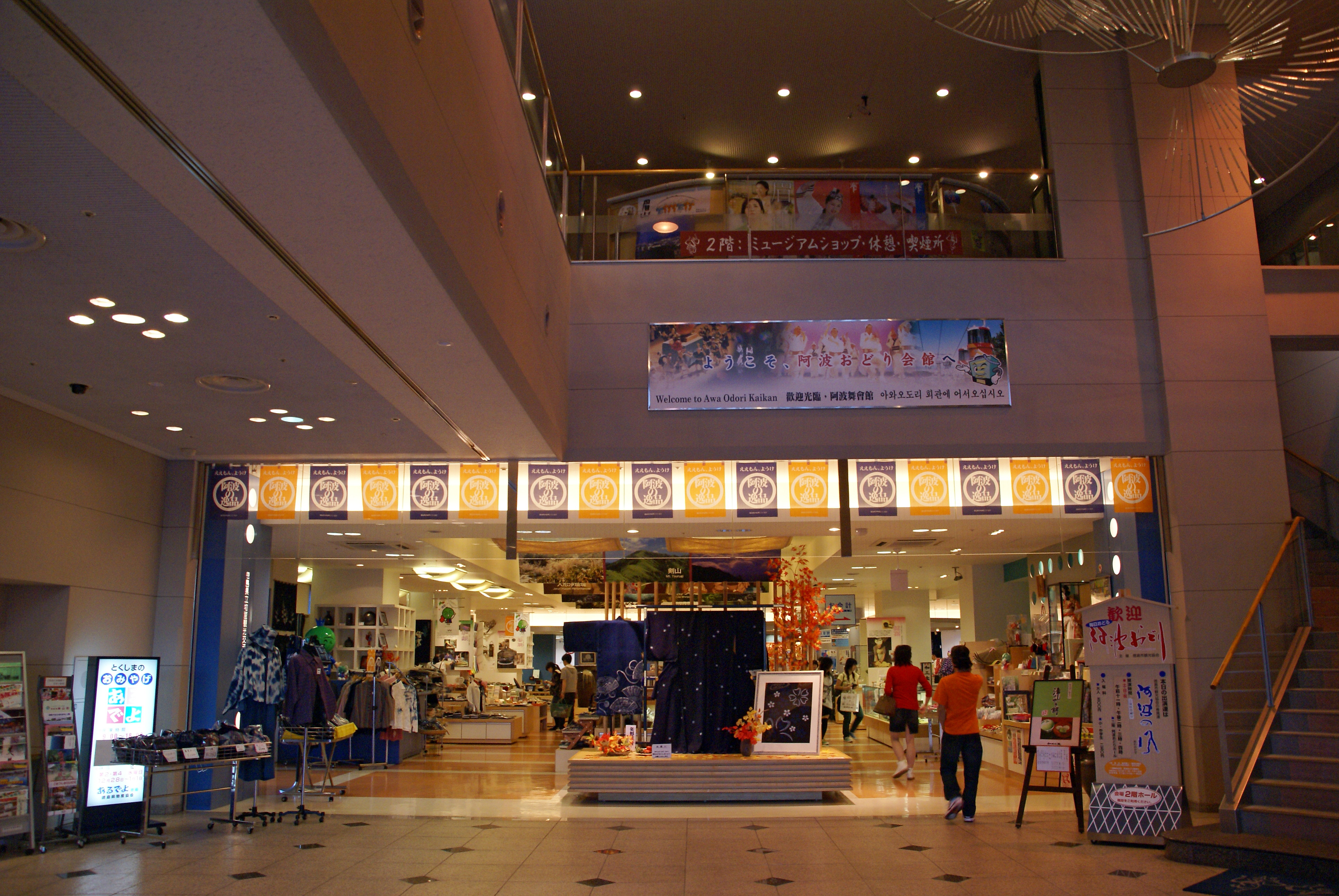

The Hall rents bicycles for sightseeing in the city.
