= Matsushige, Tokushima =

Location: Shikoku, Japan

Matsushige 松茂町
- Town
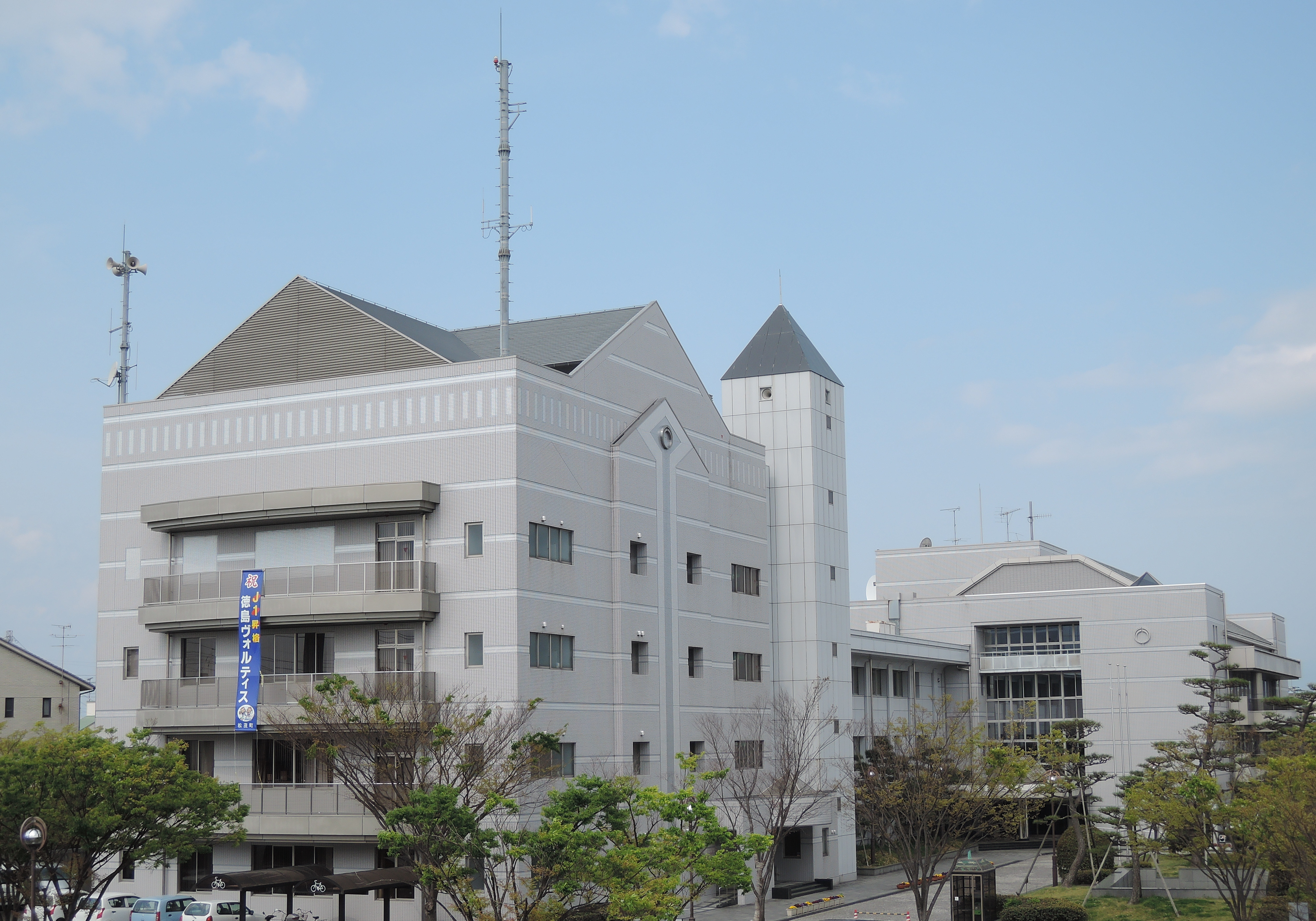
- Matsushige town hall

- Flag Emblem
- Interactive map of Matsushige
- Location in Japan
- Coordinates: 34°08′02″N 134°34′49″E
- Country: Japan
- Region: Shikoku
- Prefecture: Tokushima
- District: Itano

Government
  - Mayor: Naoto Yoshida

Area
  - Total: 14.24 km^{2} (5.50 sq mi)

Population (April 1, 2022)
  - Total: 14,770
  - Density: 1,037/km^{2} (2,686/sq mi)
- Time zone: UTC+09:00 (JST)
- City hall address: 30 Higashiura, Matsushige-cho, Itano-gun, Tokushima-ken 771-0295
- Website: Official website
- Symbols
- Flower: Lampranthus spectabilis
- Tree: Japanese black pine

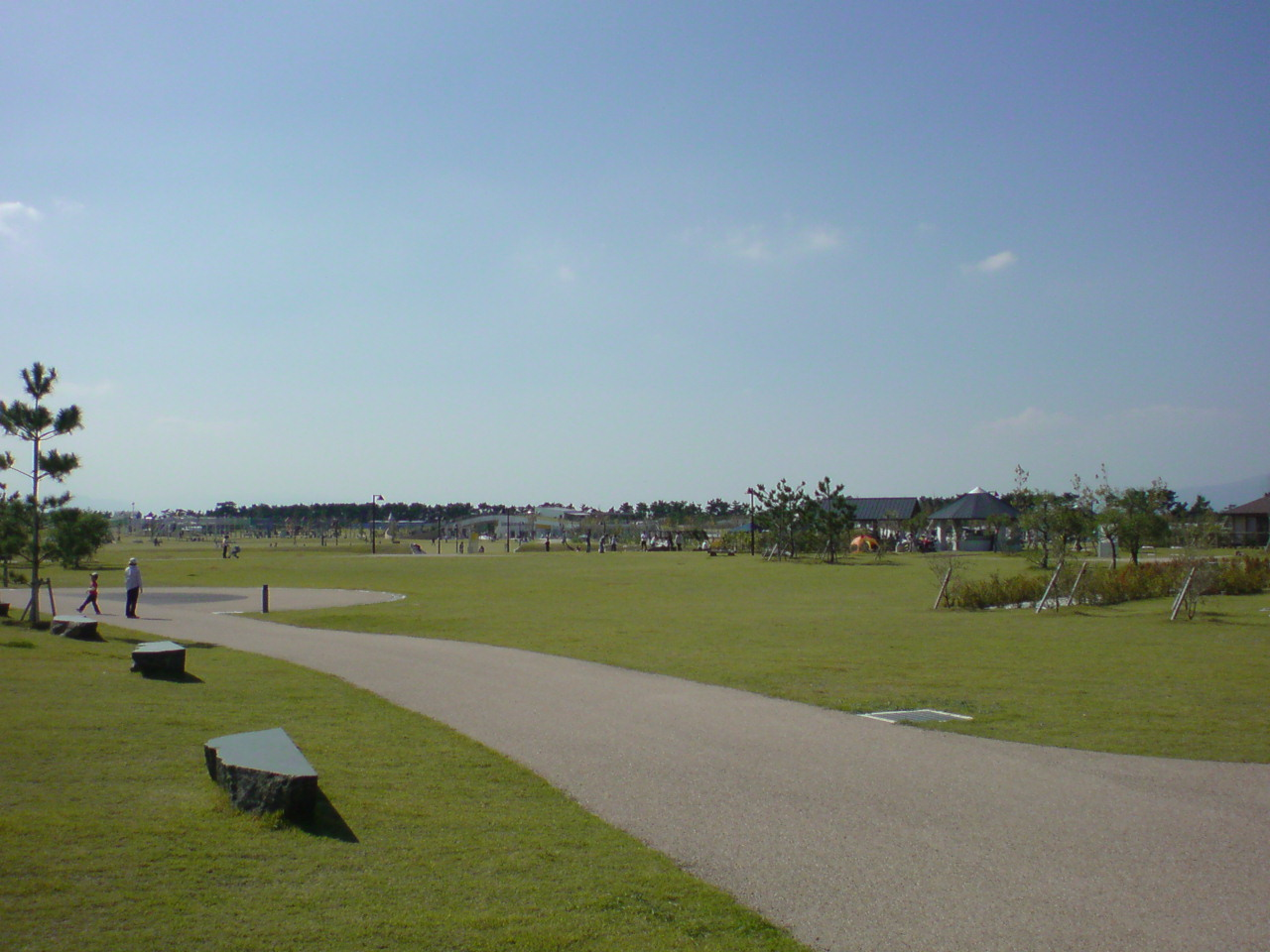
Tsukimigaoka-Kaihin-Koen

Matsushige (松茂町, Matsushige-chō) is a town located in Itano District, Tokushima Prefecture, Japan. As of 1 April 2022, the town had an estimated population of 14,770 in 6,794 households and a population density of 1000 persons per km^{2}. The total area of the town is 14.24 square kilometres (5.50 sq mi). Matsushige is the location of Tokushima Airport, from where domestic flights depart for various other Japanese cities. The town also hosts a Japan Maritime Self-Defense Force base.

== Geography ==
Matsushige is located between Tokushima and Naruto cities, facing the Kii Channel to the east side. It is situated on the delta of the Yoshino River.

=== Neighbouring municipalities ===
Tokushima Prefecture

- Kitajima
- Naruto
- Tokushima

== Climate ==
Matsushige has a humid subtropical climate (Köppen Cfa) characterized by warm summers and cool winters with light snowfall. The average annual temperature in Matsushige is 16.2 °C. The average annual rainfall is 1637 mm with September as the wettest month. The temperatures are highest on average in August, at around 26.7 °C, and lowest in January, at around 6.3 °C.

== Demographics ==
Per Japanese census data, the population of Matsushige has been growing steadily since the 1940s.

Historical population
Year	Pop.	±%
1920	5,626	—
1930	5,524	−1.8%
1940	5,484	−0.7%
1950	6,750	+23.1%
1960	7,697	+14.0%
1970	8,349	+8.5%
1980	10,196	+22.1%
1990	12,096	+18.6%
2000	14,267	+17.9%
2010	15,078	+5.7%

== History ==
As with all of Tokushima Prefecture, the area of Matsushige was part of ancient Awa Province. It was noted for ocean-borne shipping, especially of timber, from Tosa Province to the Kinai region. During the Edo period, the area was part of the holdings of Tokushima Domain ruled by the Hachisuka clan from their seat at Tokushima Castle. The village of Matsushige was established within Itano District, Tokushima with the creation of the modern municipalities system on 1 October 1889. It was raised to town status on 1 August 1961.

== Government ==
Matsushige has a mayor-council form of government with a directly elected mayor and a unicameral town council of 12 members. Matsushige, together with the other municipalities of Itano District, contributes four members to the Tokushima Prefectural Assembly. In terms of national politics, the town is part of Tokushima 2nd district of the lower house of the Diet of Japan.

The JMSDF Air Training Group Tokushima and the JGSDF 14th Aviation Unit are located in Matsushige.

== Economy ==
Matsushige has a mixed economy based on agriculture, commercial fishing and light manufacturing.

== Education ==
Matsushige has three public elementary schools and one public middle school operated by the town government. The town does not have a high school.

== Transportation ==
=== Airports ===
- Tokushima Airport

=== Railway ===
Matsushige has no passenger railway service. The closest stations are Kyokaimae Station and Kompiramae Station on the JR Shikoku Naruto Line; however, Tokushima Station is often used for convenience.

=== Highways ===
- Tokushima Expressway
- National Route 11
- National Route 28

== Sister cities ==
- Mount Vernon, Washington, United States
