= Tokushima Airport =

Airport in Matsushige, Tokushima Prefecture, Japan

Tokushima Awaodori Airport
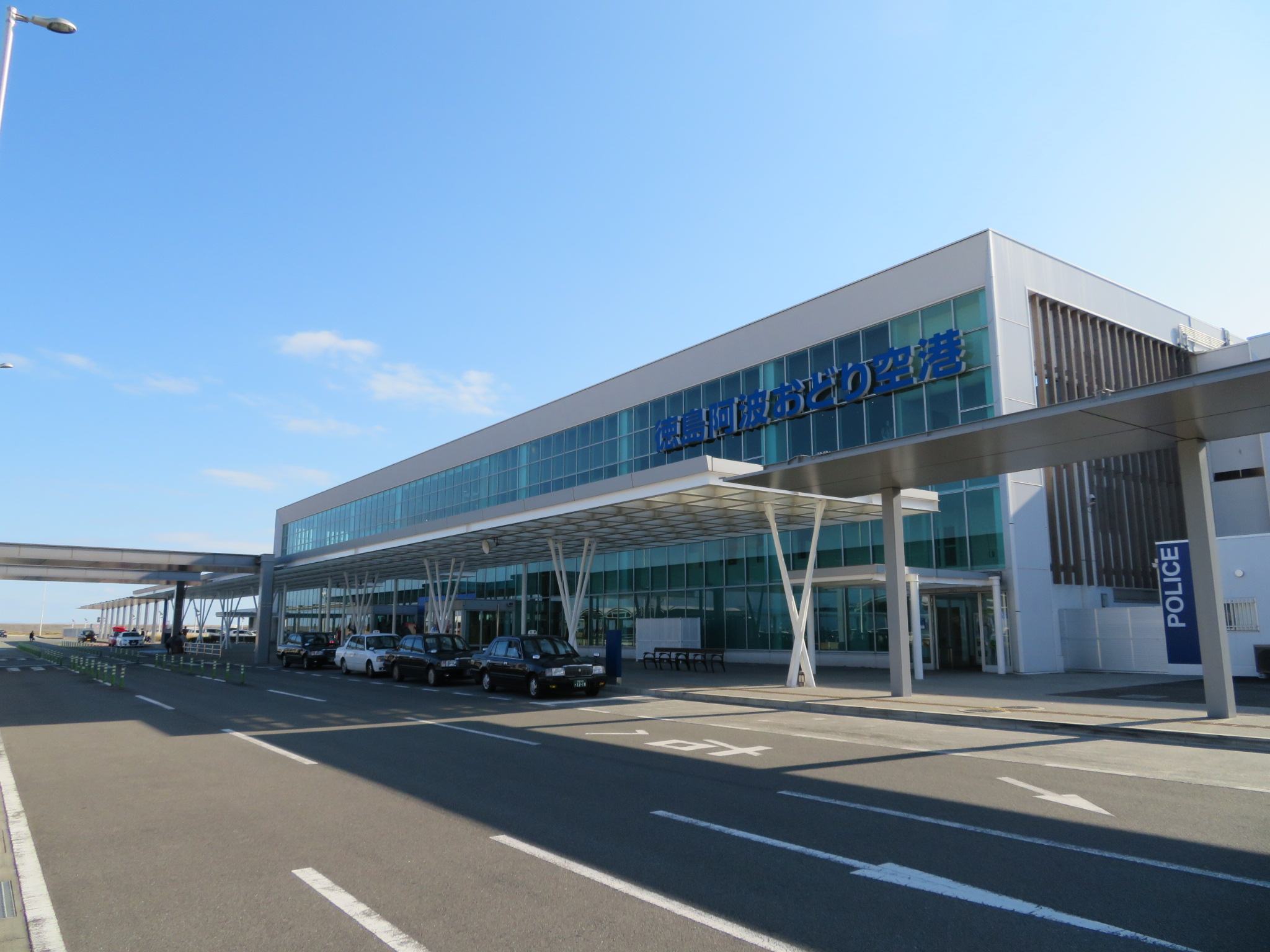
- IATA: TKS; ICAO: RJOS

Summary
- Airport type: Public / Military
- Owner: Japan Self-Defense Force/Government
- Operator: Japan Maritime Self-Defense Force; Japan Ground Self-Defense Force
- Serves: Tokushima, Japan
- Location: Matsushige, Tokushima Prefecture, Japan
- Elevation AMSL: 37 ft / 11 m
- Coordinates: 34°07′56″N 134°36′33″E

Map
- Location in Japan TKS/RJOS (Japan)

Runways
Direction	Length		Surface
Direction	m	ft	Surface
11/29	2,500	8,202	Asphalt

Statistics (2015)
- Passengers: 1,000,121
- Cargo (metric tonnes): 2,258
- Aircraft movement: 10,732
- Source: Japanese Ministry of Land, Infrastructure, Transport and Tourism

Tokushima Awaodori Airport (徳島阿波おどり空港, Tokushima Awa-odori kūkō) (IATA: TKS, ICAO: RJOS) is a joint civil-military airport in Matsushige, Tokushima Prefecture, Japan, near the city of Tokushima.

In addition to scheduled passenger operations, the airport is the base of the Japan Maritime Self-Defense Force Tokushima Air Training Group of 202nd Naval Air Training Squadron equipped with Beechcraft TC-90. There are also UH-60J Search and Rescue aircraft of one flight which detached from JMSDF 72 Squadron. As a result, it is the busiest airport in Shikoku by aircraft operations, with around 15,000 takeoffs and landings each year. The Japan Ground Self-Defense Force established the 14 Squadron flying at least two Fuji UH-1J and one Kawasaki OH-6D by mid-April 2010 at the airport.

== History ==
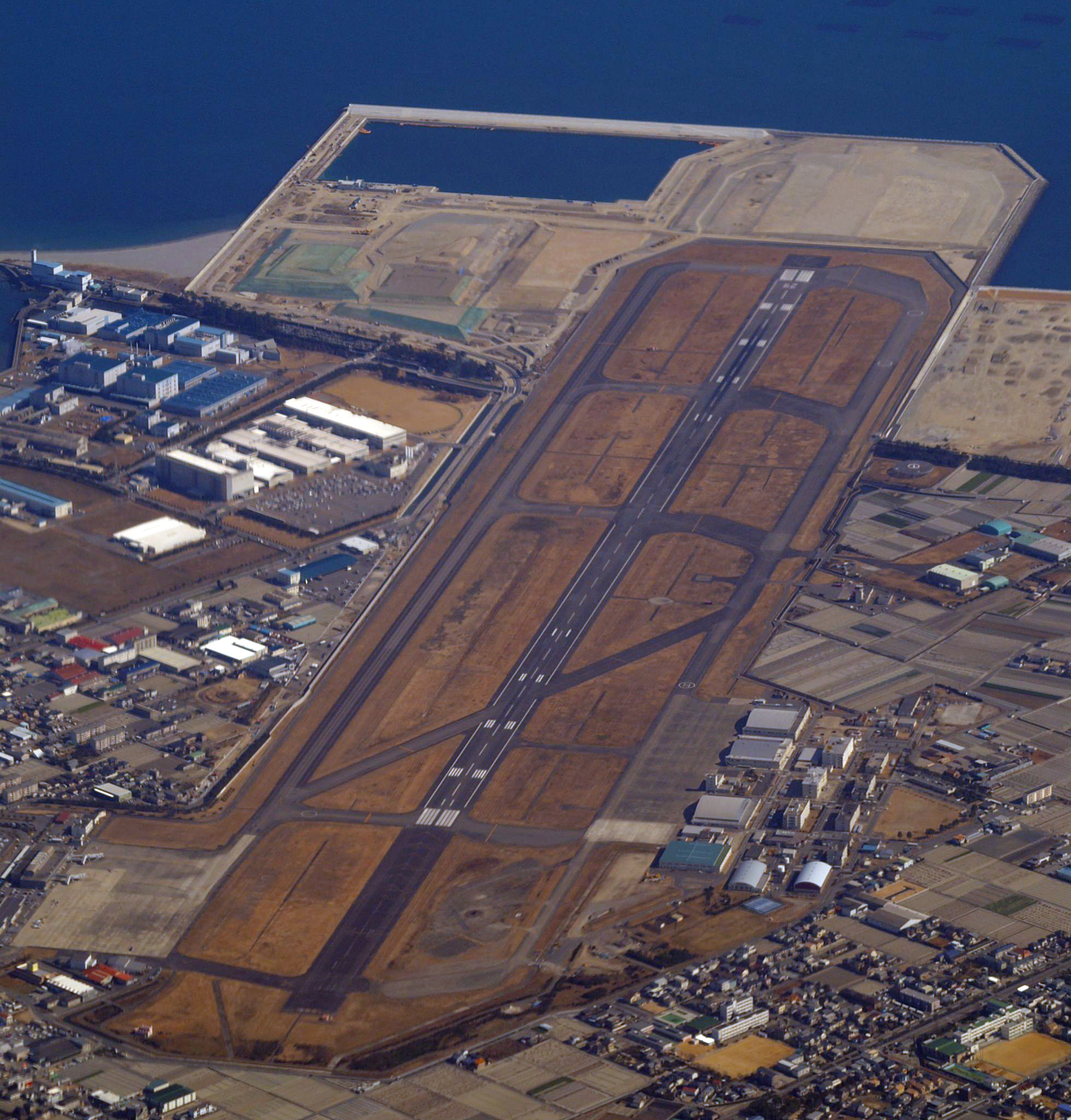
Aerial view of Tokushima Airport

Tokushima Airport opened as an Imperial Japanese Navy air base in 1941 but Japan Air Transport opened a seaplane facility in Tokushima in 1922.

The current runway was completed in 1987; it was extended to 2,500 m (8,202 ft), with projected completion in 2010.

The airport has had scheduled service to Kagoshima (1997–98), Kansai (briefly in 2000), and Osaka/Itami (until 2003). There are 12 scheduled flights per day.

On April 13, 2006, Skymark Airlines discontinued its flights to Tokyo International Airport (Haneda) leaving Japan Airlines as the sole carrier to Tokyo. In response to Skymark's exit, Japan Airlines increased the number of flights between the two cities. Since Tokyo-Haneda opened its fourth runway while ending additional curfew restrictions, All Nippon Airways announced the resumption of service to Tokyo.

A new passenger terminal opened in the first quarter of 2010.

An international terminal facility with a dedicated boarding bridge and waiting area opened in January 2018, mainly to accommodate charter flights from China.

ShinMaywa Industries, Ltd. maintains a plant (primarily aircraft modification and refurbishment) at the airport. The plant also provides components for the Gulfstream G550 [GV-SP] and Kawasaki P-1.

== Airlines and destinations ==
Airlines	Destinations
All Nippon Airways	Tokyo-Haneda
Eastar Jet	Seoul-Incheon
J-Air	Fukuoka
Japan Airlines	Tokyo-Haneda, Sapporo-Chitose (Seasonal)

== Accidents and incidents ==
- On April 5, 2015, Japan Airlines Flight 455, a Boeing 767-346 carrying 67 passengers and crews, was forced to initiate a Go-around after touching down as the pilot noticed there was a vehicle inside the runway. Investigations by the Japan Transport Safety Board later revealed that the single air traffic controller of the Japan Maritime Self Defense Force in charge at the time neglected protocols and allowed the vehicle on to the runway 10 minutes before he approved the landing of the 767.
