= Kitajima, Tokushima =

Kitajima 北島町
- Town
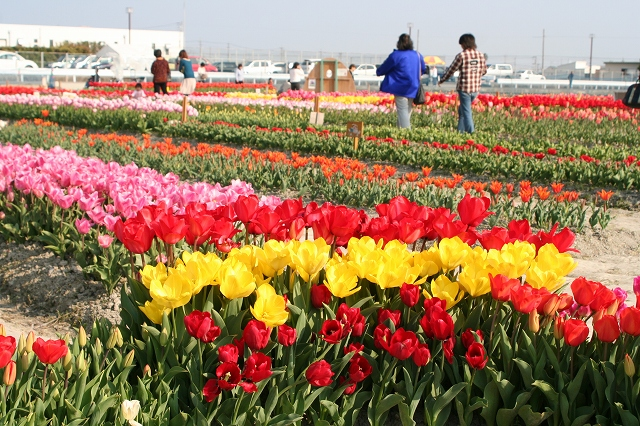
- Tulip Park in Kitajima

- Flag Emblem
- Interactive map of Kitajima
- Location in Japan
- Coordinates: 34°8′N 134°33′E
- Country: Japan
- Region: Shikoku
- Prefecture: Tokushima
- District: Itano

Government
  - Mayor: Yasuhiro Furukawa

Area
  - Total: 8.74 km^{2} (3.37 sq mi)

Population (December 31, 2023)
  - Total: 23,680
  - Density: 2,710/km^{2} (7,020/sq mi)
- Time zone: UTC+09:00 (JST)
- City hall address: 23-1 Kamiji, Nakamura, Kitajima-cho, Itano-gun, Tokushima-ken 771-0203
- Website: Official website
- Symbols
- Flower: Chrysanthemum morifolium
- Tree: Osmanthus fragrans

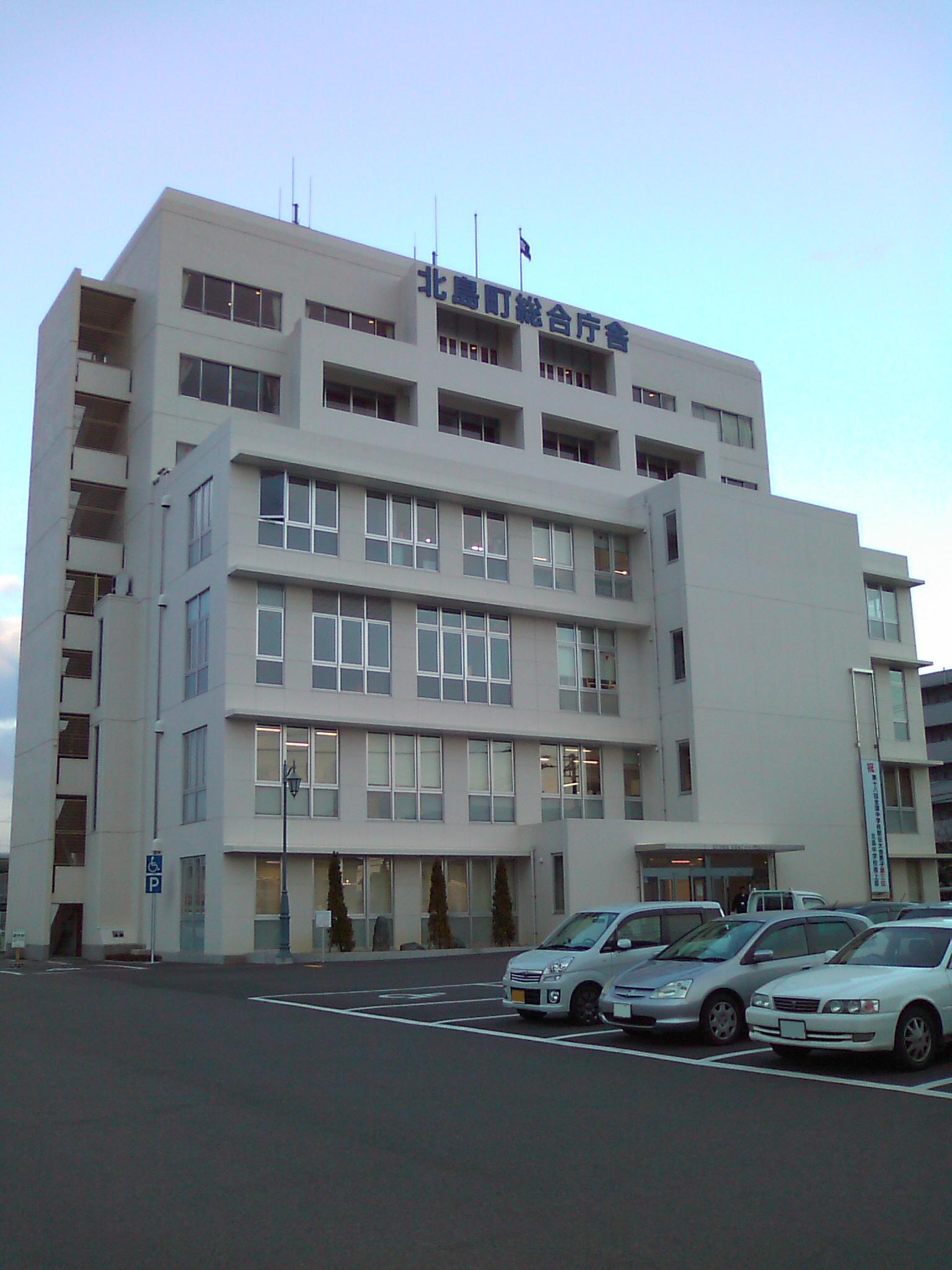
Kitajima Town Hall

Kitajima (北島町, Kitajima-chō) is a town located in Itano District, Tokushima Prefecture, Japan. As of 1 December 2023, the town had an estimated population of 23,680 in 10340 households and a population density of 2700 persons per km^{2}. The total area of the town is 8.74 square kilometres (3.37 sq mi). It has the smallest area among local governments in Tokushima prefecture and is also the most densely populated town or village in Shikoku.

== Geography ==
Kitajima is located in the flatlands of northeastern Tokushima Prefecture on the island of Shikoku. It is located on the delta at the mouth of the Yoshino River. The Kyuyoshino River runs on the north side of the town, and the Imagire River runs on the south side of the town, and both rivers form a sandbar shaped like a gourd.

=== Neighbouring municipalities ===
Tokushima Prefecture

- Aizumi
- Matsushige
- Naruto
- Tokushima

== Climate ==
Kitajima has a humid subtropical climate (Köppen Cfa) characterized by warm summers and cool winters with light snowfall. The average annual temperature in Kitajima is 16.2 °C. The average annual rainfall is 1637 mm with September as the wettest month. The temperatures are highest on average in August, at around 26.7 °C, and lowest in January, at around 6.3 °C.

== Demographics ==
Per Japanese census data, the population of Kitajima has been growing steadily for the past century.

Historical population
Year	Pop.	±%
1920	4,406	—
1930	4,612	+4.7%
1940	7,698	+66.9%
1950	6,124	−20.4%
1960	8,095	+32.2%
1970	13,453	+66.2%
1980	16,466	+22.4%
1990	18,986	+15.3%
2000	19,823	+4.4%
2010	21,662	+9.3%

== History ==
As with all of Tokushima Prefecture, the area of Kitajima was part of ancient Awa Province. The village of Kitajima was established within Itano District, Tokushima with the creation of the modern municipalities system on October 1, 1889. It was raised to town status on February 11, 1940.

== Government ==
Kitajima has a mayor-council form of government with a directly elected mayor and a unicameral town council of 13 members. Kitajima, together with the other municipalities of Itano District, contributes four members to the Tokushima Prefectural Assembly. In terms of national politics, the town is part of Tokushima 2nd district of the lower house of the Diet of Japan.

== Economy ==
Kitajima once prospered as an industrial company town with large factories by Nisshinbo, Toagosei, and Toho Rayon, but in recent years it been transformed into a commercial center and a commuter town for neighboring Tokushima city.

== Education ==
Kitajima has three public elementary schools and two public middle schools operated by the town government and one public high school operated by the Tokushima Prefectural Department of Education. The Tokushima Prefectural Fire Academy is located in Kitajima.

== Transportation ==
=== Railway ===
The Shikoku Railway Company Kōtoku Line passes through the town, but there is no station. The nearest passenger stations are Shōzui in Aizumi or Yoshinari in Tokushima.

=== Highways ===
- Tokushima Expressway

== Notable people from Kitajima ==
- Seiji Honda, footballer
