= Itano District, Tokushima =

District in Tokushima Prefecture, Japan

Coordinates: 34.131°N 134.482°E

Location in Tokushima Prefecture See SVG File

Itano (板野郡, Itano-gun) is a district located in Tokushima Prefecture, Japan.

As of June 1, 2019, the district has an estimated population of 97,263 and a population density of 884 inhabitants per square kilometre (2,290/sq mi). The total area is 110.05 km^{2} (42.49 sq mi).

Matsushige is home to Tokushima Airport.

== Towns and villages ==
- Aizumi
- Itano
- Kamiita
- Kitajima
- Matsushige

== Municipal timeline ==
- April 1, 2005 - The towns of Donari and Yoshino merged to form the new city of Awa.
