= Tokushima Prefecture =

Prefecture of Japan

Coordinates: 34°2′N 134°26′E

Tokushima Prefecture 徳島県
- Prefecture

Japanese transcription(s)
  - Japanese: 徳島県
  - Rōmaji: Tokushima-ken
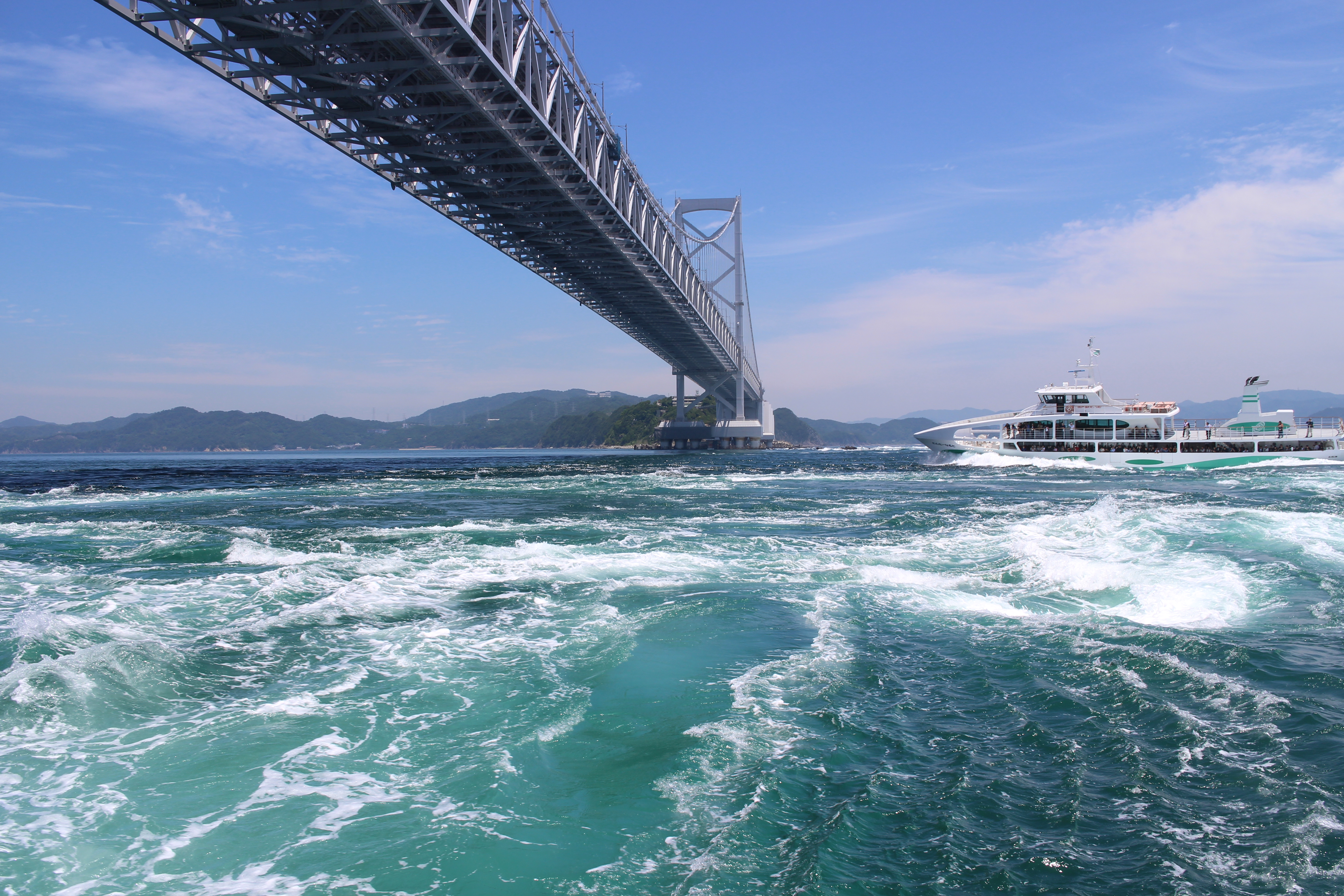
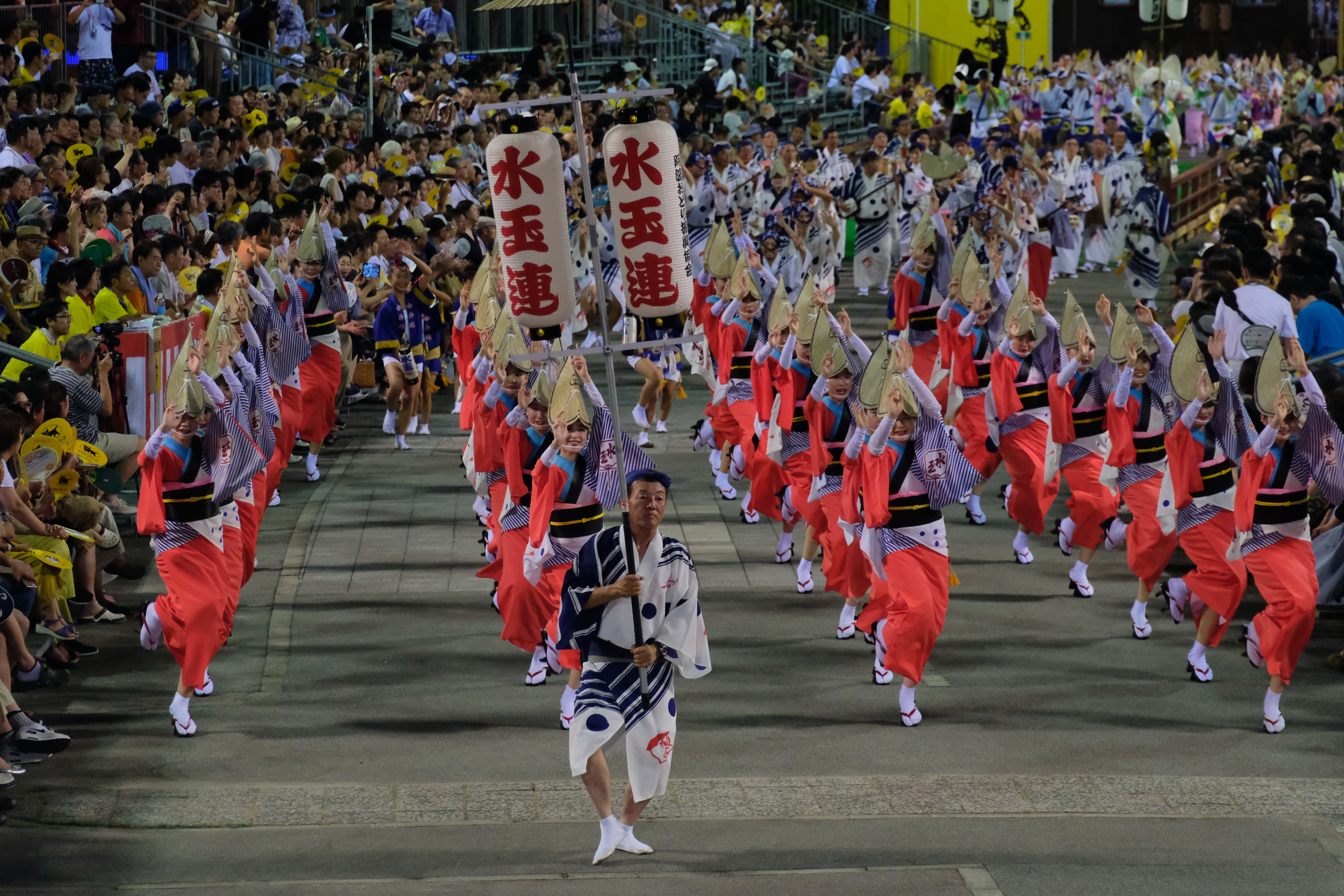
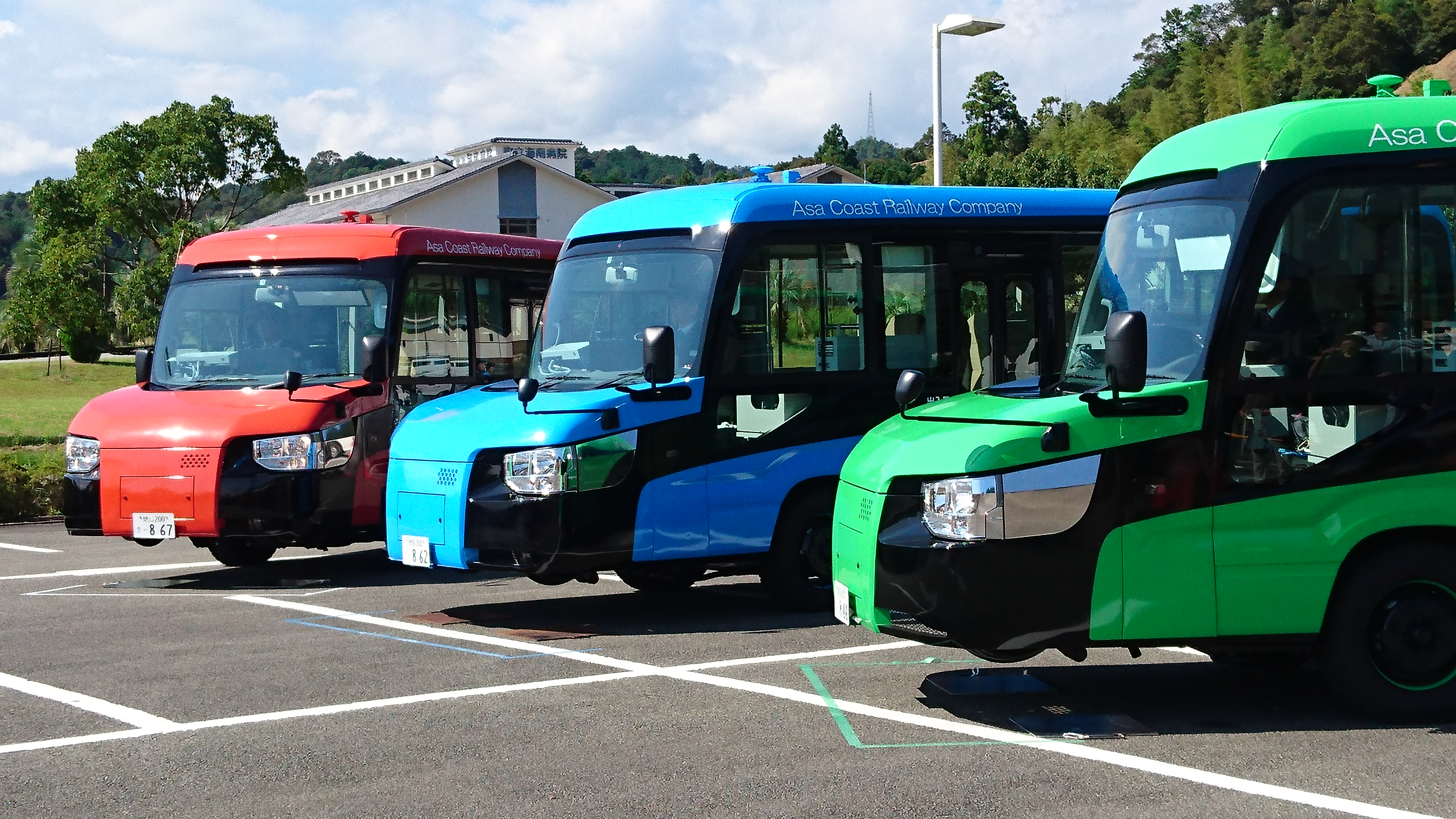
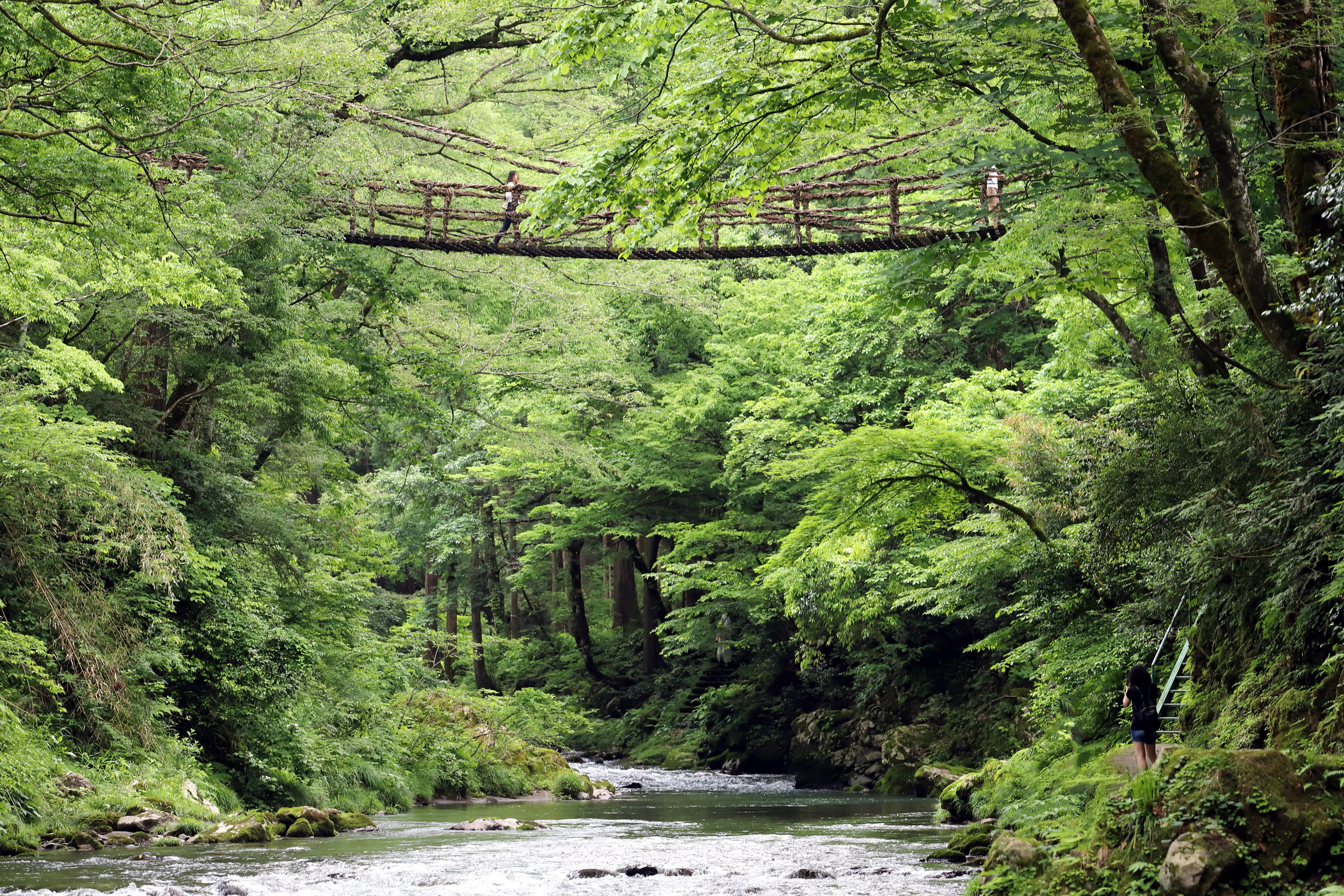
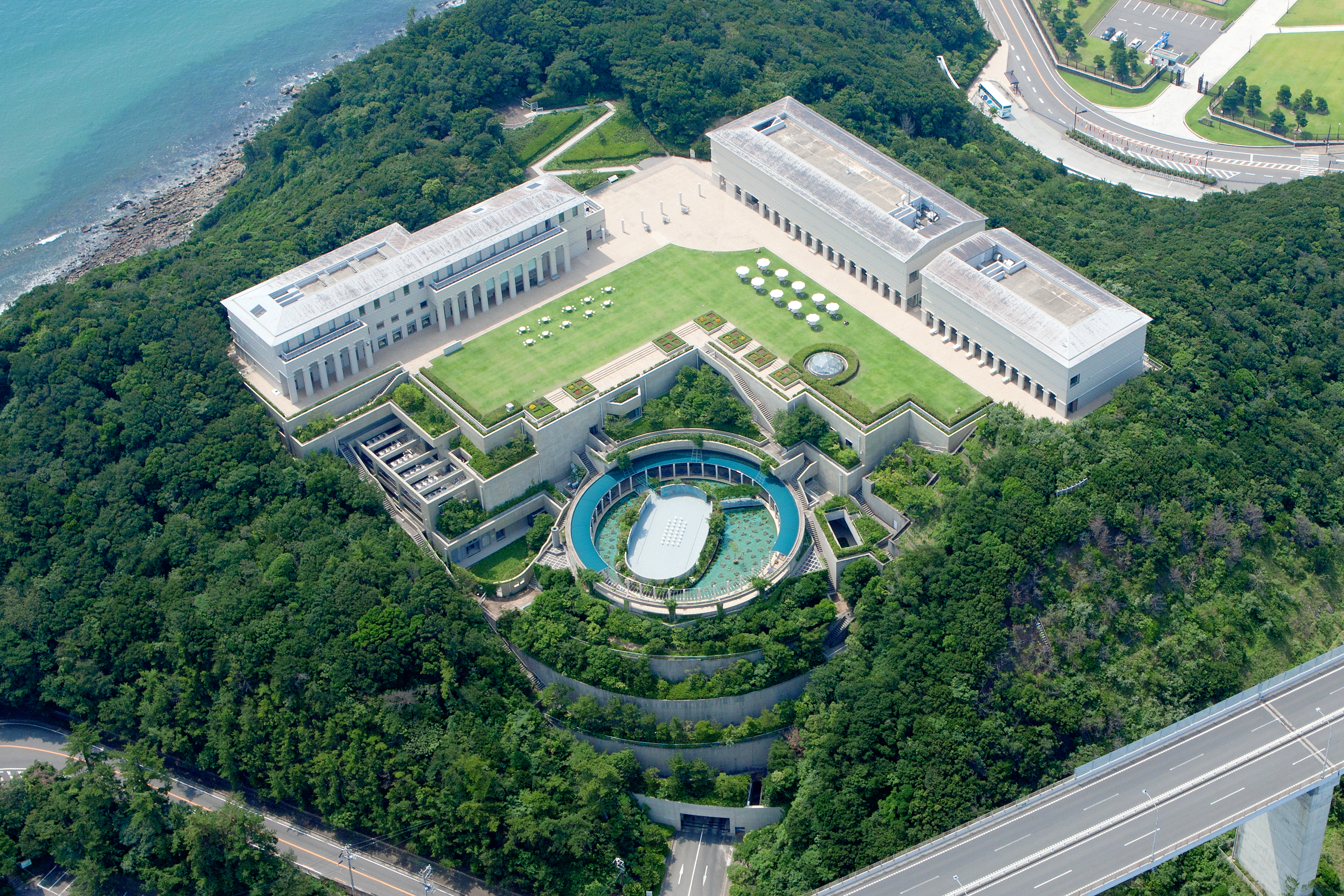
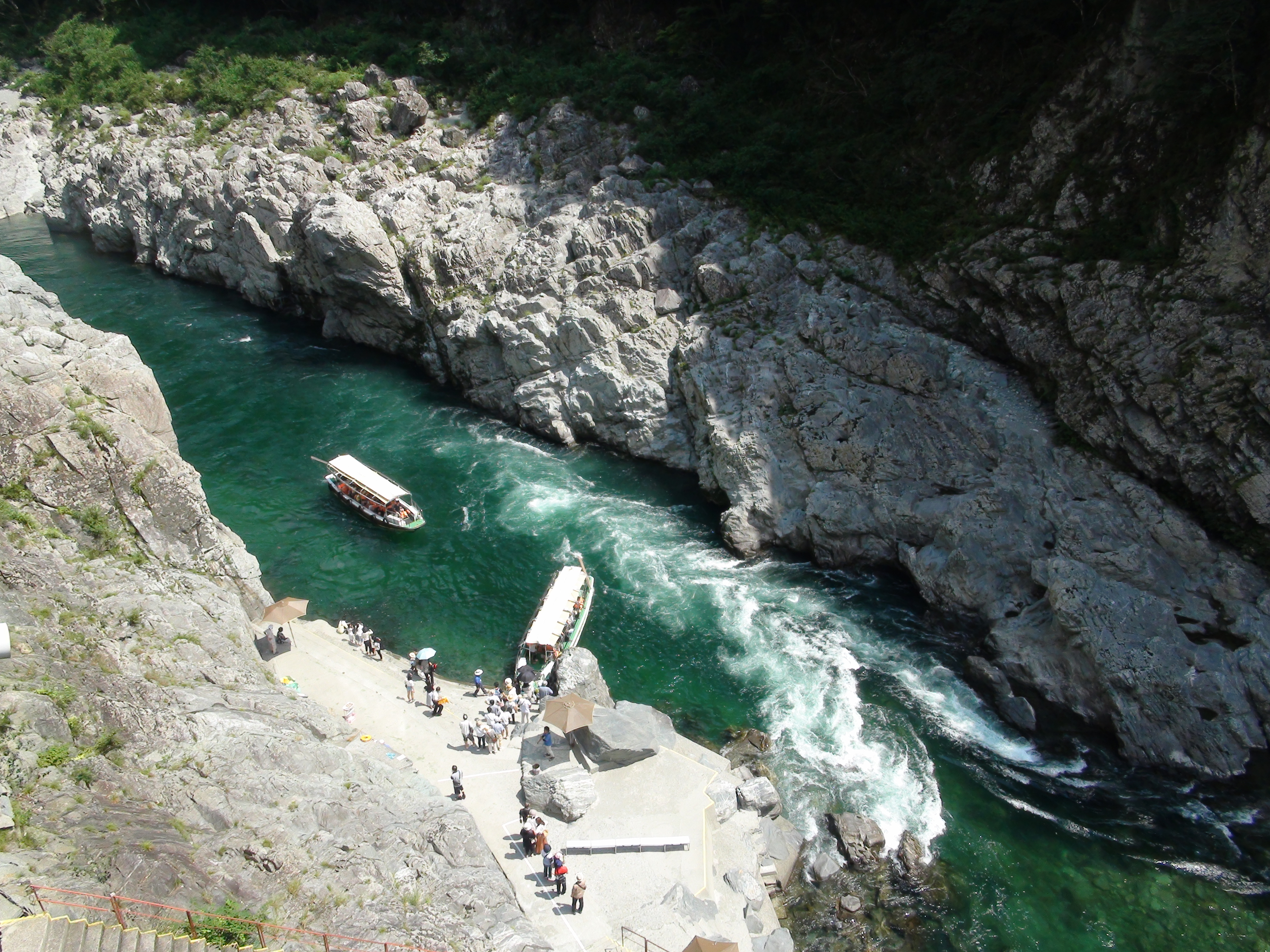
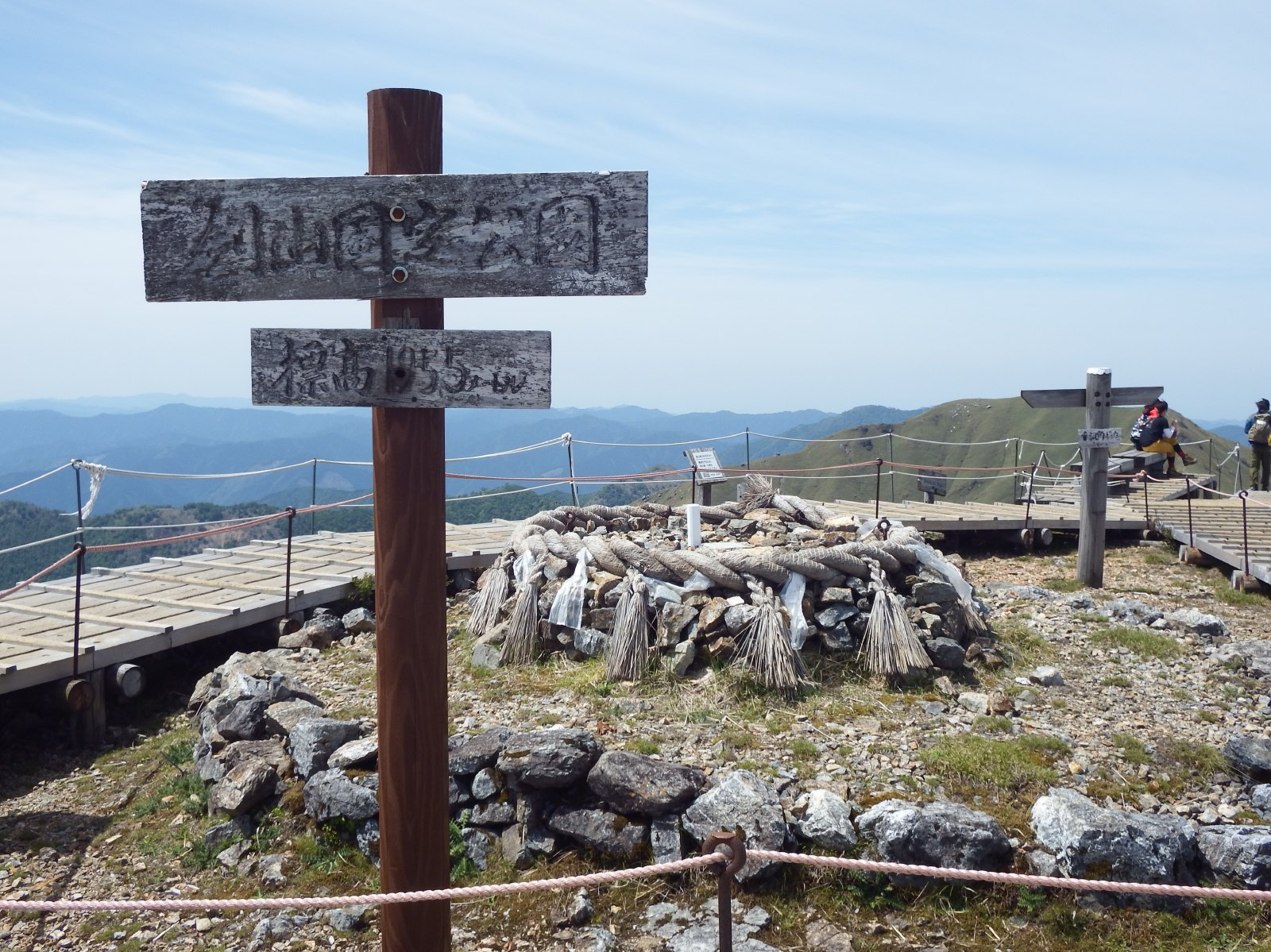
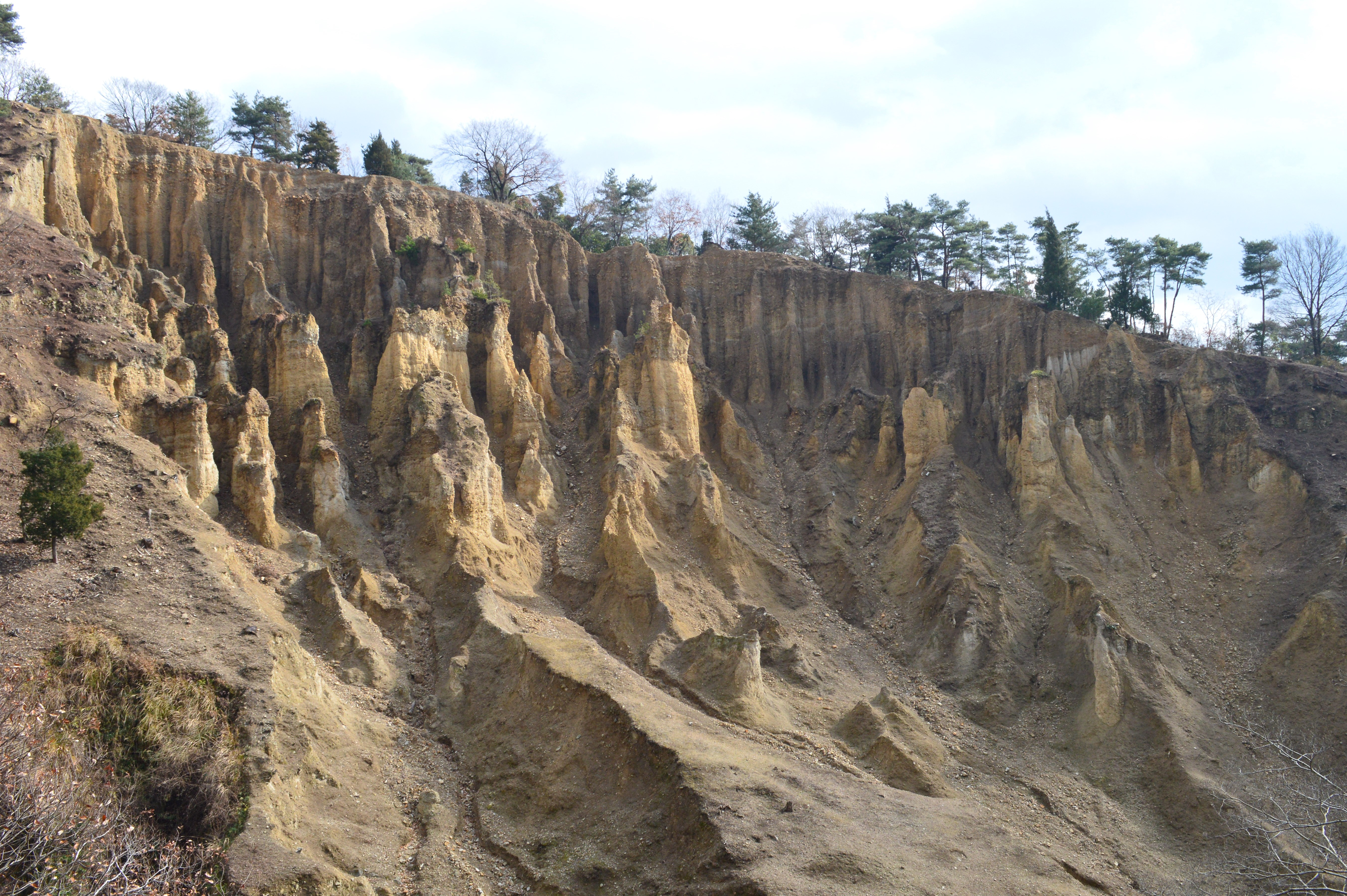
- Naruto whirlpools and Naruto suspension bridge Awa Odori Dual-mode vehicle in Asatō Line Kazura waddle bridge in Iya Valley Naruto Museum of Art Oboke gorge and pleasure boat On the top of Mount Tsurugi Hoodoo in Dochū-Kōtsu Prefectural Natural Park

- Flag Symbol
- Anthem: Tokushima kenmin no uta
- Country: Japan
- Region: Shikoku
- Island: Shikoku
- Capital: Tokushima
- Subdivisions: Districts: 8, Municipalities: 24

Government
  - Governor: Masazumi Gotoda

Area
  - Total: 4,146.80 km^{2} (1,601.09 sq mi)
  - Rank: 36th

Population (February 1, 2025)
  - Total: 682,439
  - Rank: 44th
  - Density: 165/km^{2} (430/sq mi)

GDP
  - Total: JP¥ 3,266 billion US$ 24.1 billion (2022)
- ISO 3166 code: JP-36
- Website: pref.tokushima.jp/english/
- Symbols of Japan
- Bird: White heron
- Flower: Sudachi (Citrus sudachi)
- Mascot: Sudachi-kun
- Tree: Yamamomo (Myrica rubra)

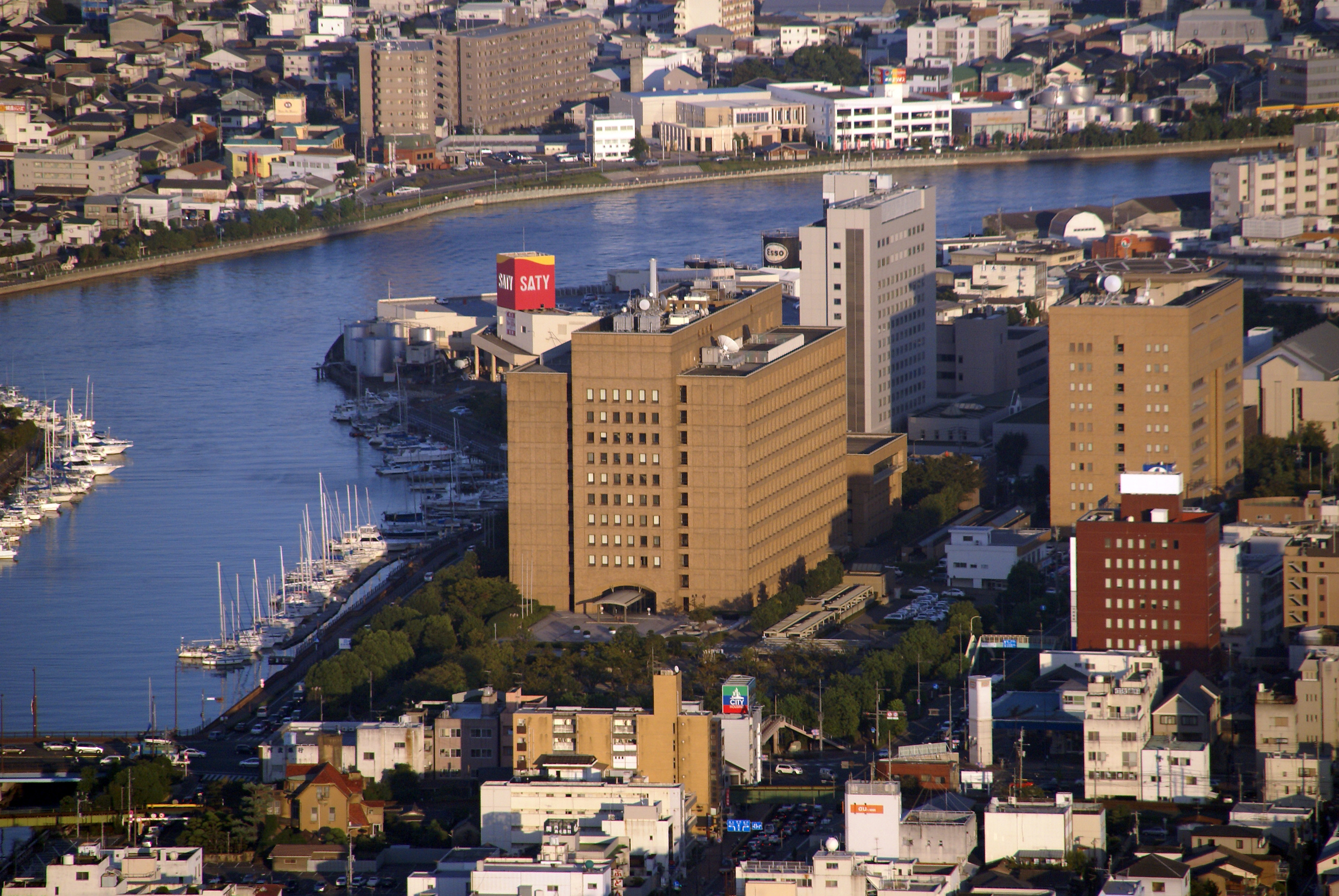
The confluence of the Shinmachi River and the Suketō River in Tokushima City, Tokushima Prefecture centered on the prefectural headquarters

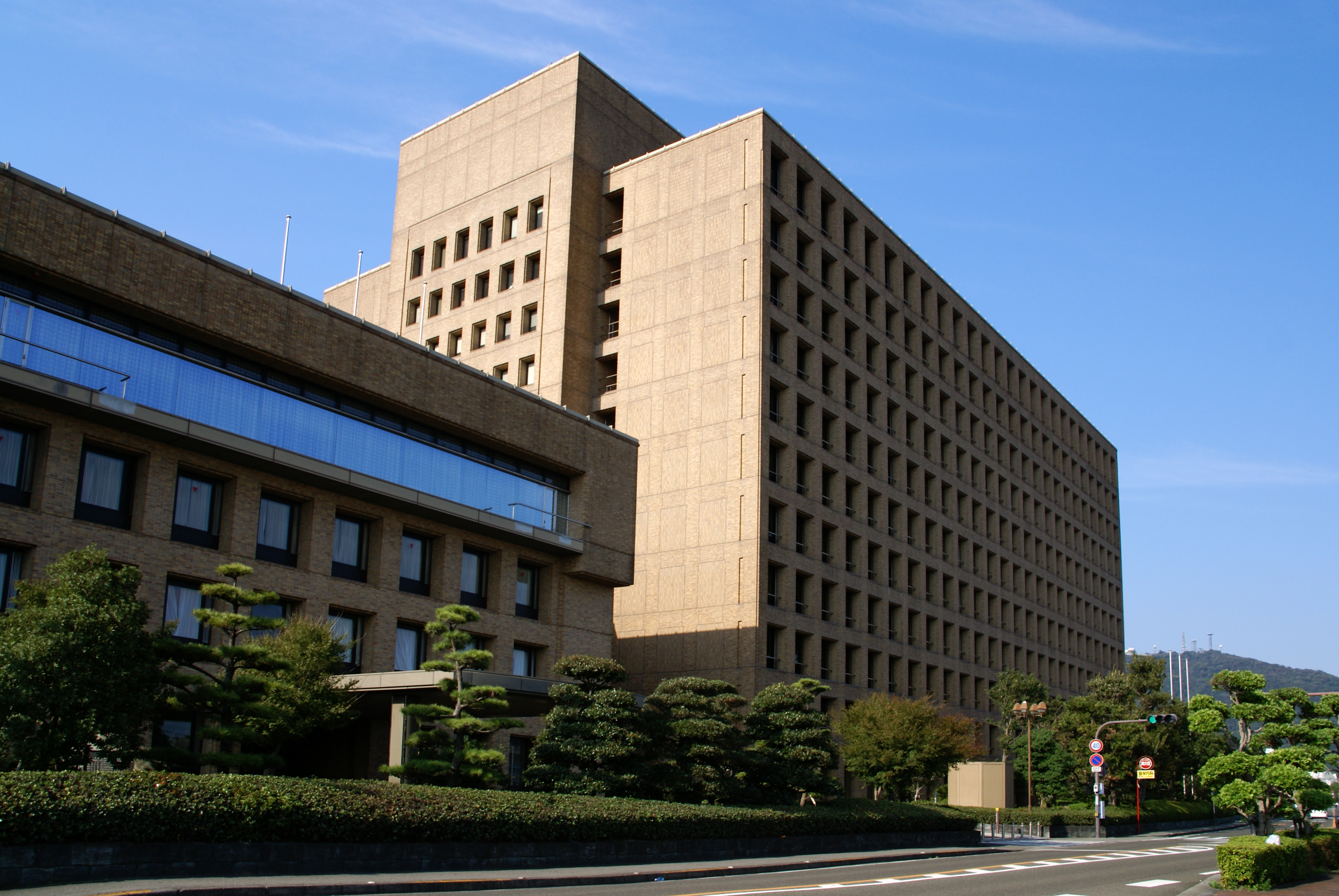
Tokushima Prefectural Office

Tokushima Prefecture (徳島県, Tokushima-ken; Japanese pronunciation: [tò̞.kɯ̥̈.ɕì.mä̀, -ɕí.mä̀, -ɕí.mä́.kè̞ɴ̀]) is a prefecture of Japan located on the island of Shikoku. Tokushima Prefecture has a population of 682,439 (1 February 2025) and has a geographic area of 4,146 km^{2} (1,601 sq mi). Tokushima Prefecture borders Kagawa Prefecture to the north, Ehime Prefecture to the west, and Kōchi Prefecture to the southwest.

Tokushima is the capital and largest city of Tokushima Prefecture, with other major cities including Anan, Naruto, and Yoshinogawa. Tokushima Prefecture is located on the Kii Channel, connecting the Pacific Ocean and Seto Inland Sea, across from Wakayama Prefecture on the Kii Peninsula of the island of Honshu. Tokushima Prefecture is connected to Awaji Island across the Naruto Strait by the Ōnaruto Bridge as part of the Kobe-Awaji-Naruto Expressway, connecting the prefecture to the city of Kobe and the San'yō Expressway on Honshu.

== History ==
Until the Meiji Restoration, Tokushima Prefecture was known as Awa Province.

=== Tokushima Prefecture and Myodo Prefecture ===
In ancient times, Tokushima City belonged to a region known as Myōdō-gun. In the first wave of government consolidation following the abolishment of the fiefdom system and construction of prefectures in 1871, it became known as Myodo Prefecture. At the time, it included the Awa region to the south and the Awaji Island regions as well. In 1873 it further incorporated the region currently occupied by Kagawa Prefecture in its borders.

In the second wave of government consolidation, on September 5, 1875, the Sanuki Region separated to form the modern day Kagawa Prefecture. On August 21, 1876, Awaji Island separated to join Hyōgo Prefecture and the Awa region separated to form Kochi Prefecture.

On March 2, 1880, Myodo Prefecture fully separated from Kochi Prefecture to be inaugurated as Tokushima Prefecture.

=== Post-war ===
- 1945 August – End of World War II. The Washi no Mon gate to Tokushima Castle is destroyed by fire.
- 1946 December – The Nankai earthquake occurs, causing vast damage throughout the prefecture.
- 1947 May – Naruto City is inaugurated.
- 1949 May – Tokushima University is created.
- 1951 June – Komatsushima City is inaugurated.
- 1953 November – The Prefectural Library is completed in Tokushima Park
- 1957 November – The Nagayasuguchi Dam is completed along the Naka River
- 1958 January – A ferry from Komatsushima to Wakayama sinks. All passengers are lost.
- 1958 May – Anan City is inaugurated.
- 1959 April – Shikoku Hoso begins TV broadcasts.
- 1960 May – A tsunami caused by a quake in Chile causes damage in the prefecture's south.
- 1961 April – The Short Term Women's College in Tokushima is opened, later reformed into Shikoku University.
- 1961 July – The Lesser Naruto Bridge is opened in the Lesser Naruto Straits.
- 1963 April – The Tokushima Municipal Culture Center is completed.
- 1963 July – A new thermal electric power plant is created in Anan.
- 1967 January – Construction of the Tokushima Airport terminal is completed.
- 1970 August – Construction of the Koboke Dam on the Yoshino River is terminated.
- 1972 January – Use of a railway connecting the towns of Itano and Kamiita is terminated.
- 1972 July – Construction of Route 11 over the Yoshino River Ohashi is completed.
- 1973 April – A railway is opened connecting the Mugi and Kaifu regions.
- 1974 October – Tokushima-born Takeo Miki is elected as Prime Minister of Japan.
- 1975 March – Construction of the Ikeda Dam over the Yoshino River is completed.
- 1976 July – A ceremony is held to celebrate the beginning of construction for the Onaruto Bridge.
- 1981 October – The National University Naruto Kyoiku Daigaku is opened.
- 1982 August – Ikeda Highschool takes first place in the 64th National Baseball Championships.
- 1985 March – Use of the Komatsushima trainline is stopped.
- 1985 – The Onaruto Bridge, connecting Tokushima and Hyōgo Prefectures, is completed.
- 1989 May – The 40th National Planting Festival is held in the Kamiyama Shirin Park.
- 1990 January – Plans for a seaside park in Tokushima City are called off.
- 1990 November – Construction of the Bunka no Mori park area is completed, and the Tokushima Prefectural Library shifts grounds to here.
- 1991 June – Plans for a resort in the Kurozo Marsh in Ikeda-cho are called off.
- 1992 March – A railway is opened connecting the Kaifu and Kamoura regions.
- 1993 August – Route 55 is extended from Komatsushima City down to Anan City.
- 1993 September – The 48th National Citizen's Athletics Festival, Shikoku East Summer Festival is held conjunctively with Kagawa Prefecture.
- 1993 October – The East Shikoku Autumna Athletics Festival is held.
- 1993 October – Construction of Asty Tokushima is completed.
- 1994 March – The first highway in the prefecture is completed, running from Aizumi to Wakimachi.
- 1995 January – The Kobe earthquake occurs
- 1998 March – The Otsuka Museum of Fine Arts is opened.
- 1998 April – Tokushima and mainland Japan are connected with the completion of the Akashi Kaikyo Bridge
- 1999 July – Construction of the Awa Odori Dance Hall is completed.
- 2000 January – A referendum for building a sluice-gate dam over the Yoshino River is rejected by the citizens.
- 2000 July – Construction of a second thermal electric power generator is completed within the prefecture.
- 2000 October – Construction of the Hosokawauchi Dam over the Naka River is terminated.
- 2001 August – The 13th National Agricultural Youth Exchange takes place.
- 2002 March – Governor Toshi Endo is arrested under charges of bribery.
- 2002 October – The Prefectural Calligraphy Hall is opened.
- 2003 June – The Komatsushima factory for Toyobo is shut down.
- 2004 October – Yoshinogawa City is inaugurated.
- 2004 October – The 28th National Planting Festival is held in Kamiyama's Shirin Park.
- 2004 December – The soccer team Tokushima Vortis enters J2, making the first ever Shikoku J-league team.
- 2005 March – Mima City and the towns of Tsurugi and Naka are inaugurated.
- 2005 April – Anan City is inaugurated, and the South District Administration Bureau is created.
- 2005 April – The Shikoku Island League is created, and baseball team The Indigo Socks represents Tokushima.
- 2006 March – Miyoshi City and Higashi Miyoshi Town are inaugurated.
- 2006 March – The towns of Minami and Kaiyo are inaugurated.
- 2006 April – The West District Administration Bureau is created.
- 2006 May – The Tokushima Red Cross Hospital shifts location.
- 2007 May – The sports stadium Aguri Anan Stadium is opened.
- 2007 October – Tokushima becomes home for the 22nd National Culture Festival.

== Geography ==
Map of Tokushima Prefecture. City Town Village

The Sanuki Mountains run along the northern border of the prefecture.

As of April 1, 2012, 9% of the total land area of the prefecture was designated as Natural Parks, namely the Setonaikai National Park; Muroto-Anan Kaigan and Tsurugisan Quasi-National Parks; and Chūbu Sankei, Dochū-Kōtsu, Hashikura, Higashi Sankei, Okumiyagawa-Uchidani, and Ōasayama Prefectural Natural Parks.

=== Cities ===
Eight cities are located in Tokushima Prefecture:

Name		Area (km^{2})	Population	Map
Rōmaji	Kanji	Area (km^{2})	Population	Map
Anan	阿南市	279.25	70,405	
Awa	阿波市	191.11	35,294	
Komatsushima	小松島市	45.37	36,817	
Mima	美馬市	367.14	28,689	
Miyoshi	三好市	721.42	24,368	
Naruto	鳴門市	135.66	56,222	
Tokushima (capital)	徳島市	191	258,554	
Yoshinogawa	吉野川市	144.14	39,405	

=== Towns and villages ===
These are the towns and villages in each district:

Name		Area (km^{2})	Population	District	Type	Map
Rōmaji	Kanji	Area (km^{2})	Population	District	Type	Map
Aizumi	藍住町	16.27	35,054	Itano District	Town	
Higashimiyoshi	東みよし町	122.48	14,025	Miyoshi District	Town	
Ishii	石井町	28.85	25,062	Myōzai District	Town	
Itano	板野町	36.22	13,183	Itano District	Town	
Kaiyō	海陽町	327.65	8,578	Kaifu District	Town	
Kamiita	上板町	34.58	11,562	Itano District	Town	
Kamikatsu	上勝町	109.63	1,344	Katsuura District	Town	
Kamiyama	神山町	173.3	4,724	Myōzai District	Town	
Katsuura	勝浦町	69.83	5,131	Katsuura District	Town	
Kitajima	北島町	8.74	22,645	Itano District	Town	
Matsushige	松茂町	14.24	14,819	Itano District	Town	
Minami	美波町	140.8	6,433	Kaifu District	Town	
Mugi	牟岐町	56.62	3,852	Kaifu District	Town	
Naka	那賀町	694.98	7,549	Naka District	Town	
Sanagōchi	佐那河内村	42.28	2,106	Myōdō District	Village	
Tsurugi	つるぎ町	194.84	7,877	Mima District	Town	

== Economy and industry ==
Tokushima depends on agriculture, forestry and fisheries. The percentage of agricultural workers and productivity is the second largest in Shikoku next to Kochi. Rice fields occupy the lower region of the Yoshino River and the small, narrow plains along the shore. Much of the remaining land is used for vegetables and flowers. The prefecture is the nation's largest supplier of cauliflower and lotus roots, and the fourth largest producer of carrots. Japanese indigo is only produced here.

Northern Tokushima's growth was accelerated by the completion of the Akashi Channel Bridge, which completes the road connection from Tokushima to Kobe. Industrial development continues around the Tokushima and Naruto districts. In particular, Itano District's Aizumi Town and Kitajima Town have experienced rapid growth, which has led to a proposed merger of the towns of Itano District into Itano City in the future.

In April 2023 a school of tech entrepreneurship - the first of its kind in Japan - was opened in the Tokushima town of Kamiyama. The students, aged from 15 to 20, will be taught engineering, programming and designing, as well as business skills such as marketing. They will also learn how to pitch their business plans to investors in order to raise money.

The man behind it is Chikahiro Terada, the boss of Tokyo-based start-up Sansan, which specialises in the digitalisation of business cards. These still play a huge role in Japan's corporate world.

== Agriculture ==
Tokushima abounds in agricultural resources and is the site of large-scale production of many different types of vegetables. The plains north of the Yoshino River are particularly fertile and the produce here is often shipped to mainland Japan in the areas around Kobe, Osaka and Kyoto. Produce from Tokushima always claims top shares in markets in the Kansai region and particularly prominent are Naruto sweet potatoes, the citrus fruit "sudachi", lotus roots and strawberries.

The lack of goods heading to Tokyo has led to a relatively low national profile for local Tokushima brands. To combat this, the local Tokushima government now sends the "Fresh! Tokushima" moving display about the country with its mobile kitchen set to increase general awareness of the local food available in Tokushima Prefecture.

- Rice – Anan City
- Naruto Sweet Potatoes – Naruto City
- Corn – Ishii-cho, Yoshinogawa City East
- Sudachi – All across the prefecture, but mainly in Kamiyama-cho
- Bamboo Shoots – Anan City
- Spring Onions – Tokushima City
- Lettuce – Awa City and the north shore of the Yoshino River
- Lotus roots – Naruto City
- Carrots – All across the prefecture, but mainly in Aizumi-cho
- Cranshaw – All across the north shore of the Yoshino River, but mainly in Itano-cho
- Rakkyo – Naruto City
- Taranome – All across the West of the prefecture, but mainly in Yamashiro-cho, Miyoshi City
- Sencha – Yamashiro-cho, Naka-cho, and the former Aioi-cho
- Strawberries – All through the mountainous regions, but mainly in Sanagouchi-son
- Grapes – Awa City
- Egg plant – Naruto City
- Satsuma mandarins – All across the prefecture, but mainly in Katsuura-cho
- Yuzu – Naka-cho
- Yamamomo – Komatushima City
- Tsumamono – Kamikatsu-cho, Yamashiro-cho, Kamiyama-cho
- Daikon radish – Naruto City
- Japanese apricot – Awa-shi, but mainly in Misato-son

== Demographics ==
Tokushima prefecture population pyramid in 2020

== Culture ==
- Awa Marionette Jōruri
- Awa Odori Kaikan Hall
- Ichinomiya Castle
- Iya Valley
- Mt. Bizan
- Naruto whirlpools
- Oboke Koboke Gorge
- Otsuka Museum of Art
- Tokushima Castle
- Tokushima Handicraft Village
- Tokushima Prefectural Awa Jurobei Yashiki Puppet Theater and Museum
- Tokushima University
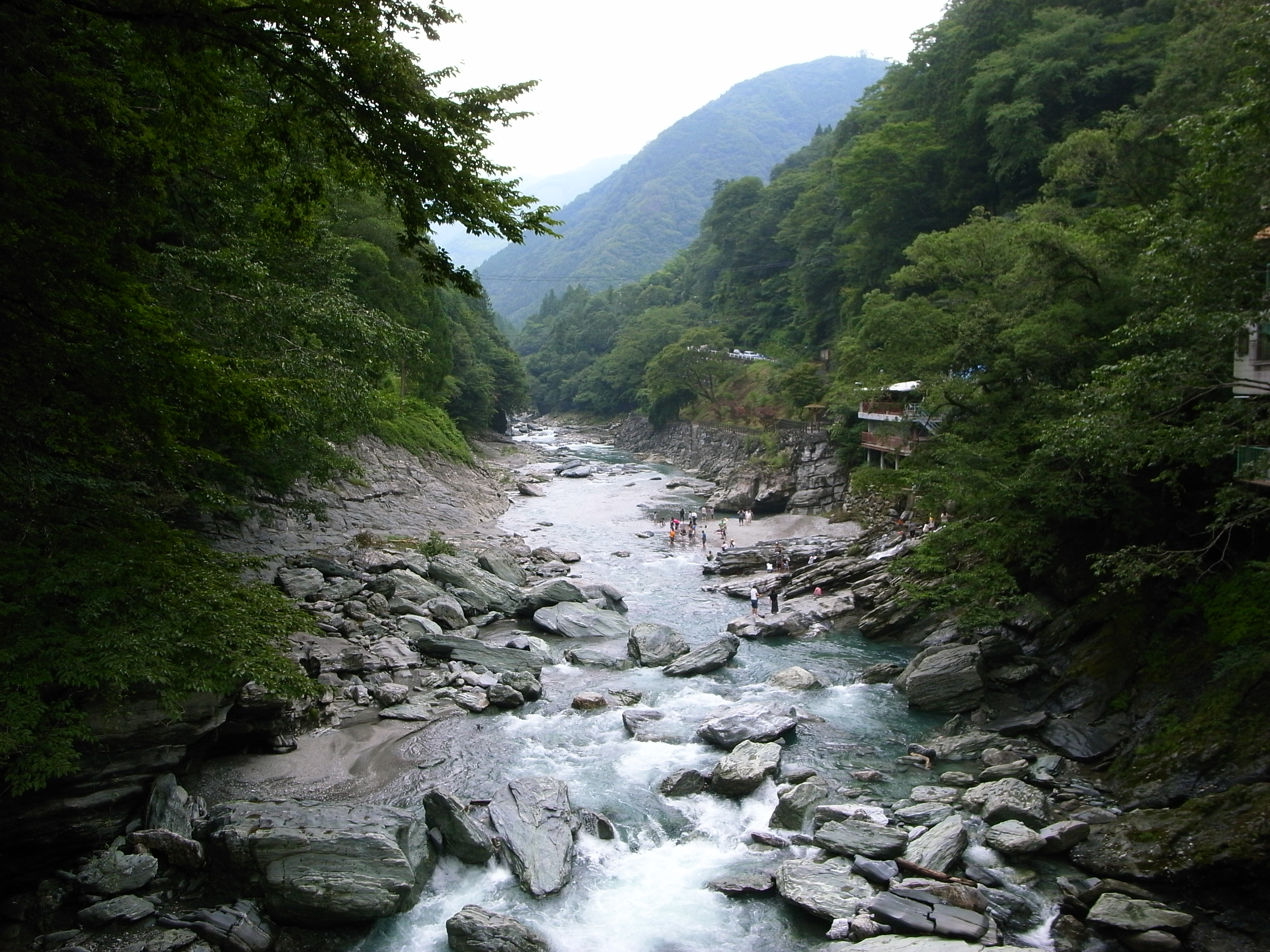
View of Iya Valley, Miyoshi

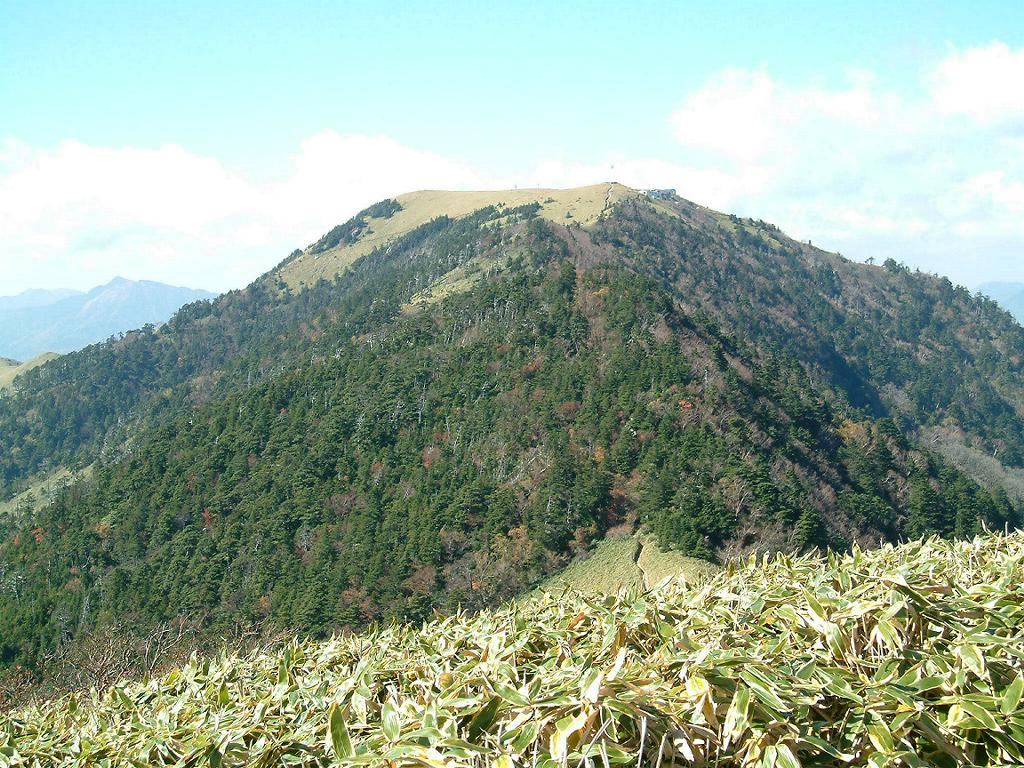
View of Mount Tsurugi

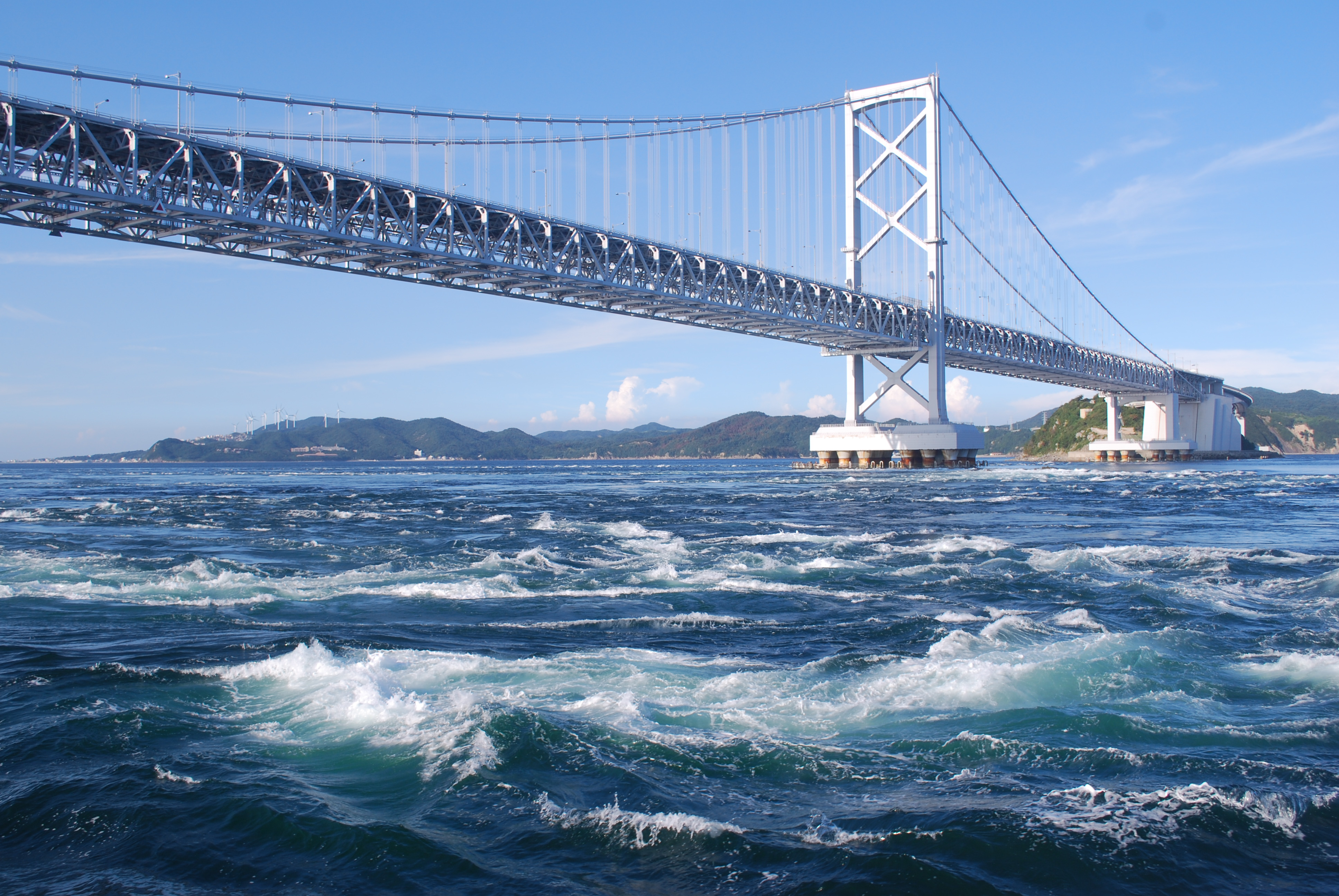
Onaruto-bridge and Naruto whirlpools

== Sports ==
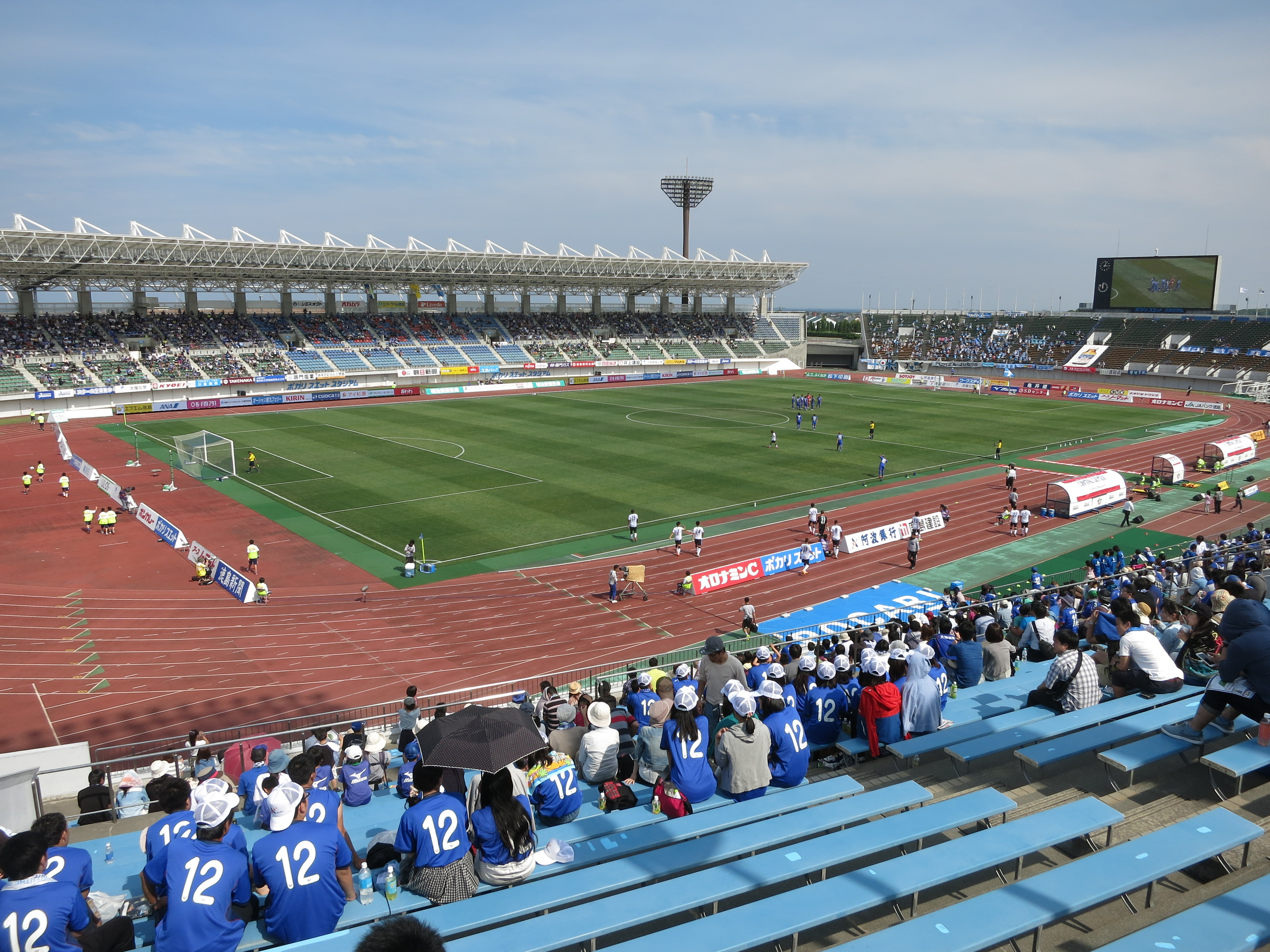
Pocarisweat Stadium in Naruto.

Tokushima hosted the official 2007 Asian Basketball Championship.

Further, the sports teams listed below are based in Tokushima.

Baseball

- Tokushima Indigo Socks

Football (soccer)

- Tokushima Vortis

== Transportation ==
=== Railway ===
- Asa Seaside Railway
- JR Shikoku
  - Dosan Line
  - Kotoku Line
  - Mugi Line
  - Naruto Line
  - Tokushima Line

=== Road ===
- National Route 11
- National Route 28
- National Route 32 (Miyoshi)
- National Route 55
- National Route 192
- National Route 193
- National Route 195
- National Route 318
- National Route 319
- National Route 377
- National Route 438
- National Route 439
- National Route 492

=== Expressway ===
- Kobe-Awaji-Naruto Expressway
- Takamatsu Expressway
- Tokushima Expressway
- Tokushima South Expressway

=== Long-distance bus (from Tokushima) ===
- Fukui
- Hiroshima
- Kanazawa
- Kansai International Airport
- Kobe (Sannomiya, Maiko)
- Kochi
- Kyoto
- Matsuyama
- Nagoya
- Okayama
- Osaka (Umeda, Namba, Universal Studio Japan)
- Sumoto
- Takamatsu
- Tokyo (Tokyo Station, Shinagawa, Shinjuku)
- Tokyo Disneyland
- Toyama
- Yokkaichi
- Yokohama

=== Airport ===
- Tokushima Awa-Dancing Airport

=== Ferry from Tokushima Port ===
- Kitakyushu
- Tokyo
- Wakayama

== Prefectural symbols ==
Tokushima's prefectural symbol is a stylized combination of the hiragana for to and ku, the first two characters in the hiragana spelling of the prefecture's name.

== Politics ==
=== Prefectural Governor (as elected by public vote) ===
- 1st – Goro Abe (阿部五郎 – April 16, 1947 – April 1, 1951
- 2nd – Kuniichi Abe (阿部邦一) – May 21, 1951 – March 30, 1955
- 3rd – Kikutaro Hara (原菊太郎) – April 25, 1955 – September 15, 1965
- 4th – Yasunobu Takeichi (武市恭信) – October 9, 1965 – October 4, 1981
- 5th – Shinzo Miki (三木申三) – October 5, 1981 – October 4, 1993
- 6th – Toshio Endo (圓藤寿穂) – October 5, 1993 – March 15, 2002
- 7th – Tadashi Oota (大田正) – April 30, 2002 – March 30, 2003
- 8th – Kamon Iizumi (飯泉嘉門) – May 18, 2003 – May 17, 2023
- 9th – Masazumi Gotoda (後藤田 正純) – May 18, 2023 – present

=== Prefectural Assembly ===
- All data is current to May 1, 2007.

Party	Total
Total	41
Liberal Democratic Party / Shinsei Club	11
Liberal Democratic Party / Koyu Club	9
Meisei Club	7
Shinpu Democratic Club	6
Kaikaku Isshin Club	3
Japanese Communist Party	3
New Komeito Group	2

== See also ==
- Awa Dance Festival
- Thirteen Buddhas of Anan
