= Miho Takai =

Japanese politician (born 1971)

- 高井 美穂
- Official portrait, 2012

Mayor of Miyoshi
- Incumbent
- Assumed office 24 July 2021
- Preceded by: Seiichi Kurokawa

Member of the Tokushima Prefectural Assembly
- In office 30 April 2015 – 25 June 2021
- Constituency: Miyoshi 1st

Member of the House of Representatives
- In office 21 December 2005 – 16 November 2012
- Preceded by: Masanori Gotō
- Succeeded by: Shunichi Yamaguchi
- Constituency: Shikoku PR (2005–2009); Tokushima 2nd (2009–2012)
- In office 10 November 2003 – 8 August 2005
- Preceded by: Naoaki Haruna
- Succeeded by: Junya Ogawa
- Constituency: Shikoku PR

Personal details
- Born: 30 November 1971 (age 54) Mino, Tokushima, Japan
- Party: Independent
- Other political affiliations: DPJ (2000–2016); DP (2016–2018); DPP (2018)
- Education: Waseda University

Miho Takai (高井 美穂, Takai Miho; born 30 November 1971) is a Japanese politician. She served in the House of Representatives in the Diet (national legislature) as a member of the Democratic Party of Japan.

== Career ==
Takai was born in Miyoshi District, Tokushima and graduated from Waseda University. She was elected for the first time in 2003 after previously running in 2000.

Takai lost her seat in the 2005 general election, but she regained the seat in December after Masanori Gotō's resignation.

She beat Shunichi Yamaguchi and won the Tokushima 2nd district's seat for the first time in 2009 general election, but she lost the seat in 2012 general election.

She decided to run for Tokushima Prefectural Assembly election in 2014.

In April 2015, Takai ran for the Miyoshi 1st district in the Tokushima Prefecture Assembly, as an independent candidate endorsed by the DPJ. She won first place in the election. She was re-elected without a vote in the 2019 Tokushima Prefectural Assembly election.

On 2 May 2021, Takai resigned from the Tokushima Prefectural Assembly and announced her candidacy for Mayor of Miyoshi. Kamon Iizumi, who was the governor of Tokushima at that time and Shunichi Yamaguchi, who is the House of Representatives member of LDP and once competed with her, announced their support for her. She won and was elected the mayor of Miyoshi.
