= Tokushima 2nd district =

Legislative district of Japan

- Parliamentary constituency for the Japanese House of Representatives
- Numbered map of Tokushima Prefecture single-member districts
- Prefecture: Tokushima
- Proportional District: Shikoku
- Electorate: 258,564

Current constituency
- Created: 1994
- Seats: One
- Party: LDP
- Representative: Shunichi Yamaguchi
- Municipalities: Naruto, Yoshinogawa, Awa, Mima, Miyoshi, Mima District, Itano District and Miyoshi District

Tokushima 2nd district (徳島県第2区, Tokushima-ken dai-niku or simply 徳島2区, Tokushima-niku) is a single-member constituency of the House of Representatives in the national Diet of Japan located in Tokushima Prefecture.

== List of representatives ==
Election	Representative	Party	Dates	Notes
1996	Shunichi Yamaguchi	LDP	1996–2005	
2000	Shunichi Yamaguchi	LDP	1996–2005	
2003	Shunichi Yamaguchi	LDP	1996–2005	
2005	Shunichi Yamaguchi	LDP	1996–2005	
2005	Shunichi Yamaguchi	Indep.	2005–2006	
2005	Shunichi Yamaguchi	LDP	2006–2009	
2009	Miho Takai	DPJ	2009–2012	
2012	Shunichi Yamaguchi	LDP	2012–present	Incumbent
2014	Shunichi Yamaguchi	LDP	2012–present	Incumbent
2017	Shunichi Yamaguchi	LDP	2012–present	Incumbent
2021	Shunichi Yamaguchi	LDP	2012–present	Incumbent
2024	Shunichi Yamaguchi	LDP	2012–present	Incumbent
2026	Shunichi Yamaguchi	LDP	2012–present	Incumbent

== Election results ==
2026
Party	Candidate	Votes	%	±%
LDP	Shunichi Yamaguchi (Incumbent)	64,980	48.6	▲4.7
DPP	Kamon Iizumi (elected in Shikoku PR block)	36,629	27.4	
Independent	Kazuto Kitajima	25,705	19.2	
JCP	Kyōsei Hama	6,504	4.9	▼1.6
Registered electors		246,643		
Turnout			55.36	▲3.50
LDP hold				

2024
Party	Candidate	Votes	%	±%
LDP {endorsed by Komeito	Shunichi Yamaguchi (Incumbent)	55,830	43.86	▼15.64
Independent (endorsed by The DPP)	Kamon Iizumi	52,151	40.97	New
Innovation	Satoshi Hōri	11,122	8.74	
JCP	Kyōsei Hama	8,198	6.44	▼0.41
Registered electors		250,797		
Turnout		127,301	51.86	▲0.87

2021
Party	Candidate	Votes	%	±%
LDP	Shunichi Yamaguchi (Incumbent)	76,879	59.50	▼11.46
CDP	Mayumi Nakano	43,473	33.65	New
JCP	Takayuki Kubo	8,851	6.85	▼15.52
Registered electors		260,655		
Turnout			50.99	▲6.58

2017
Party	Candidate	Votes	%	±%
LDP	Shinichi Yamaguchi (Incumbent)	81,616	70.96	▼3.18
JCP	Takayuki Kubo	25,726	22.37	▼3.49
HRP	Masatoshi Fukuyama	7,671	6.67	▲5.30
Registered electors		271,975		
Turnout			44.41	▼0.48

2014
Party	Candidate	Votes	%	±%
LDP	Shunichi Yamaguchi (Incumbent)	85,979	74.14	▲18.40
JCP	Takayuki Kubo	29,996	25.86	▲18.17
Turnout			44.89	

2012
Party	Candidate	Votes	%	±%
LDP	Shunichi Yamaguchi (Incumbent-Shikoku-PR)	68,526	55.74	▲11.83
DPJ	Miho Takai (Incumbent)	44,959	36.57	▼18.15
JCP	Kōji Tezuka	9,449	7.69	▲4.68
Turnout				

2009
Party	Candidate	Votes	%	±%
DPJ	Miho Takai (Incumbent-Shikoku-PR)	85,290	54.72	▲24.89
LDP	Shunichi Yamaguchi (Incumbent) (elected by Shikoku-PR)	68,430	43.91	▲16.30
HRP	Yoshirō Umemoto	2,134	1.37	New
Turnout				

2005
Party	Candidate	Votes	%	±%
Indep.	Shunichi Yamaguchi (Incumbent)	62,582	39.55	New
DPJ	Miho Takai (Incumbent-Shikoku-PR)	47,199	29.83	▼14.71
LDP	Akira Shichijo (Incumbent-Shikoku-PR) (reelected by Shikoku-PR)	43,695	27.61	▼23.79
JCP	Chiyoko Yamamoto	4,767	3.01	▼1.04
Turnout				

- Takai was elected by Shikoku-PR block additionally due to the resignation of Masanori Gotō.

2003
Party	Candidate	Votes	%	±%
LDP	Shunichi Yamaguchi (Incumbent)	72,116	51.40	▼1.33
DPJ	Miho Takai (elected by Shikoku-PR)	62,494	44.54	▲3.52
JCP	Hitoshi Fujita	5,689	4.05	▼2.20
Turnout				

2000
Party	Candidate	Votes	%	±%
LDP	Shunichi Yamaguchi (Incumbent)	76,746	52.73	▼20.28
DPJ	Miho Takai	59,693	41.02	New
JCP	Hitoshi Fujita	9.094	6.25	▼7.71
Turnout				

1996
Party	Candidate	Votes	%	±%
LDP	Shunichi Yamaguchi	86,663	73.01	New
JCP	Kōichi Kakoi	16,576	13.96	New
NSP	Yōji Kawamura	15,469	13.03	New
Turnout				
