= Tanda Kofun =

Kofun period burial mound in Japan

- 丹田古墳 (Japanese)
- Tanda Kofun Tanda Kofun (Japan)
- Interactive map of Tanda Kofun
- 34°1′26.25″N 133°56′9.98″E
- Type: Kofun
- Periods: Kofun period
- Location: Higashimiyoshi, Tokushima, Japan
- Region: Shikoku region

History
- Built: c.early 4th century

Site notes
- Public access: Yes

The Tanda Kofun (丹田古墳) is a Kofun period burial mound, located in the Nishisho neighborhood of the town of Higashimiyoshi, Tokushima on the island of Shikoku in Japan. It was designated a National Historic Site of Japan in 1977.

== Overview ==
The Tanda Kofun is located on a ridge of 460-meter Mount Kamo, on the south bank of the middle reaches of the Yoshino River in western Tokushima Prefecture. It is a zenpō-kōen-fun (前方後円墳), which is shaped like a keyhole, having one square end and one circular end, when viewed from above. The tumulus was originally believed to be an ancient sutra mound and had a small chapel to Kūkai on its summit. It was found to be an ancient kofun by the town's cultural properties committee in 1958. It is unusual in that the tumulus is a pile of crystalline schist stone rubble, with no soil used in its construction. It has a total length of 37 meters, orientated to the west. The burial chamber is a pit-type stone chamber in the posterior circular portion, and measures 4.51 meters in length, 1.3 meters in width (eastern end), 1.28 meters (western end), and 1.2 meters in height. An archaeological excavation was conducted in 1969 by Doshisha University, and grave goods, including one bronze mirror, an iron sword and an iron ax, form the early Kofun period were found. A group of pit dwellings from the end of the Yayoi period was found at the nearby Kamo Higashihara site, and it is presumed that the village was involved in the construction of the Tanda Kofun.

The tumulus is about 15 minutes by car from Awa-Kamo Station on the JR Shikoku Tokushima Line.

Overall length
37 meters
Posterior circular portion
17.5 meter diameter x 3 meters high
Anterior rectangular portion
6.6 meters wide x 1 meter high
Connecting restriction
10 meters wide

== See also ==
- List of Historic Sites of Japan (Tokushima)
