= Mikamo Station =

Railway station in Higashimiyoshi, Tokushima Prefecture, Japan

B21 Mikamo Station 三加茂駅
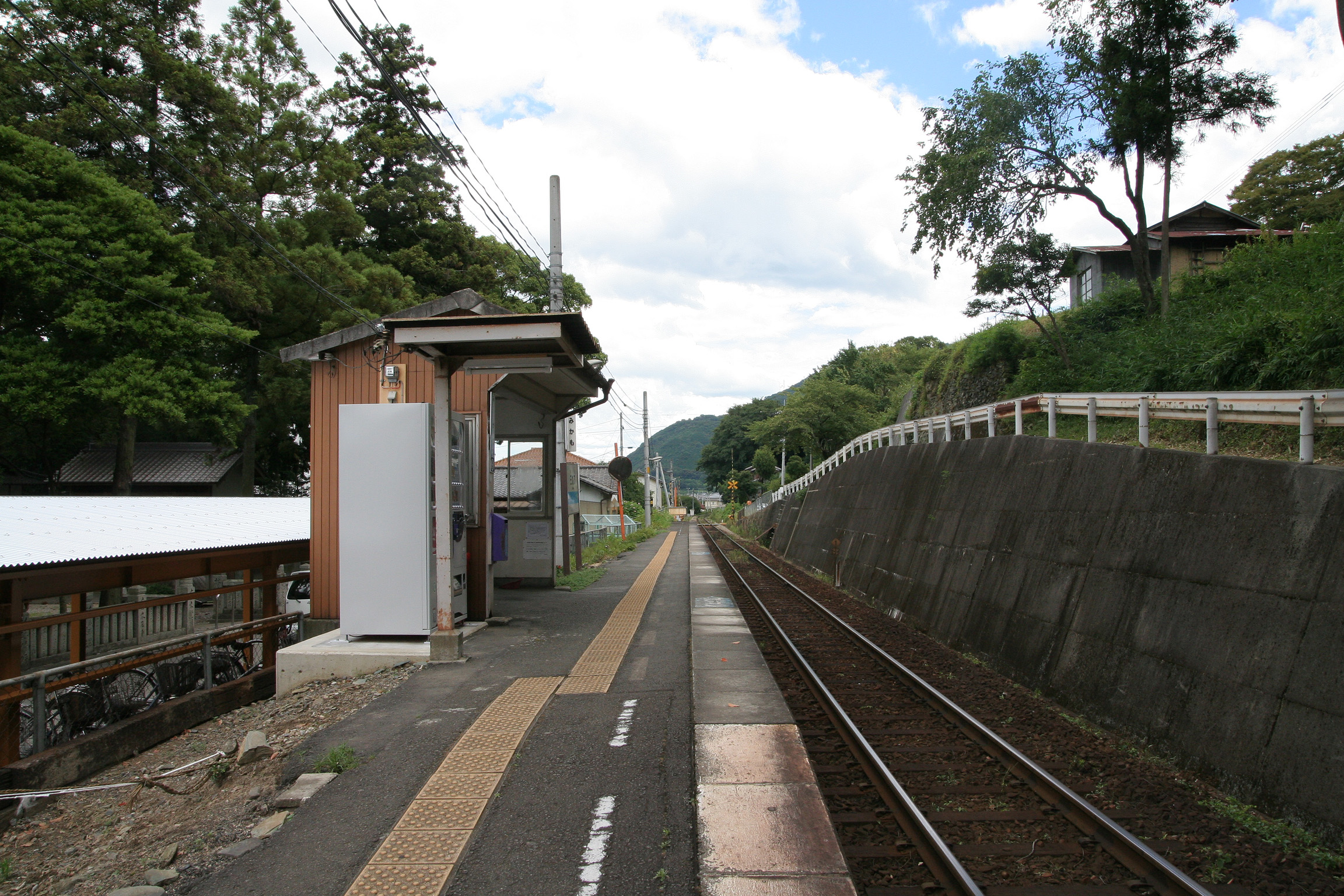
- Mikamo Station in August 2008

General information
- Location: Nakasho, Higashimiyoshi, Miyoshi-gun, Tokushima-ken 779-4703; Japan
- Coordinates: 34°02′09″N 133°56′57″E
- Operator: JR Shikoku
- Line: ■ Tokushima Line
- Distance: 8.7 km from Tsukuda
- Platforms: 1 side platform
- Tracks: 1 siding

Construction
- Structure type: At grade on sidehill cutting
- Cycle facilities: Bike shed
- Accessible: Partial - ramp to platform but there are two steps

Other information
- Status: Unstaffed
- Station code: B21

History
- Opened: 15 December 1961
Location
- Location within Tokushima Prefecture Location within Japan

Mikamo Station (三加茂駅, Mikamo-eki) is a passenger railway station located in the town of Higashimiyoshi, Miyoshi District, Tokushima Prefecture, Japan. It is operated by JR Shikoku and has the station number "B21".

== Lines ==
Mikamo Station is served by the Tokushima Line and is 8.7 km from the beginning of the line at Tsukuda. Only local trains stop at the station.

== Layout ==
The station consists of a side platform serving a single track on a sidehill cutting. There is no station building, only a shelter on the platform for waiting passengers. A ramp, with two steps, leads up to the platform from the access road. A bike shed is located at the base of the ramp.

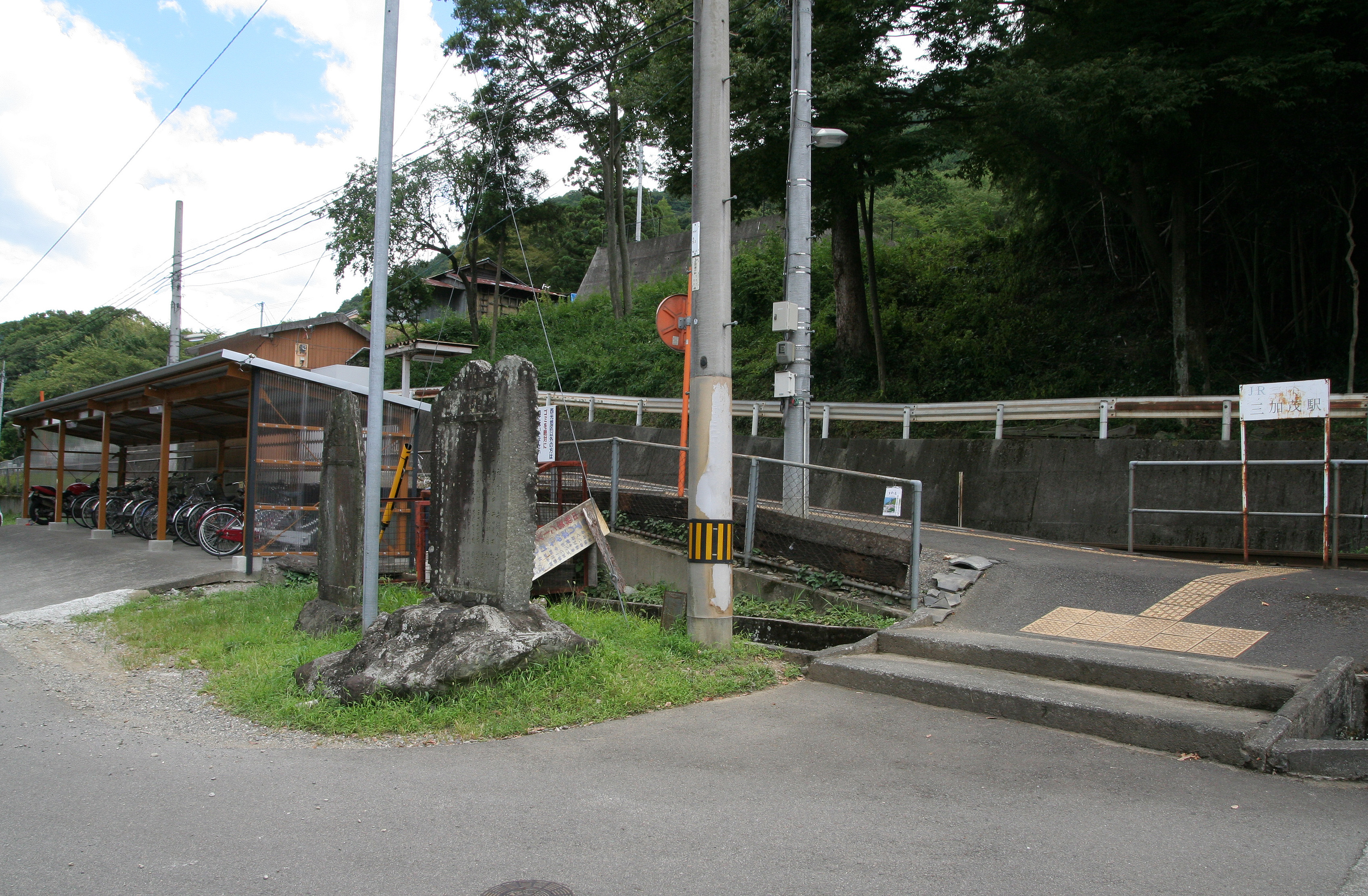
The entrance to Mikamo Station. Two steps are needed to get onto the ramp, rendering it difficult for wheelchair users. The bike shed can be seen to the left.

== Adjacent stations ==
«	Service	»
Tokushima Line
Limited Express Tsurugisan: Does not stop at this station
Awa-Kamo	Local	Eguchi

== History ==
Japanese National Railways (JNR) opened Mikamo on 15 December 1961, as an added station on the existing Tokushima Main Line. With the privatization of JNR on 1 April 1987, the station came under the control of JR Shikoku. On 1 June 1988, the line was renamed the Tokushima Line.

== Surrounding area ==
- Higashimiyoshi Municipal Misho Elementary School
- Japan National Route 192
- Kanemaru Hachiman Shrine

== See also ==
- List of railway stations in Japan
