= Eguchi Station =

Railway station in Higashimiyoshi, Tokushima Prefecture, Japan

B20 Eguchi Station 江口駅
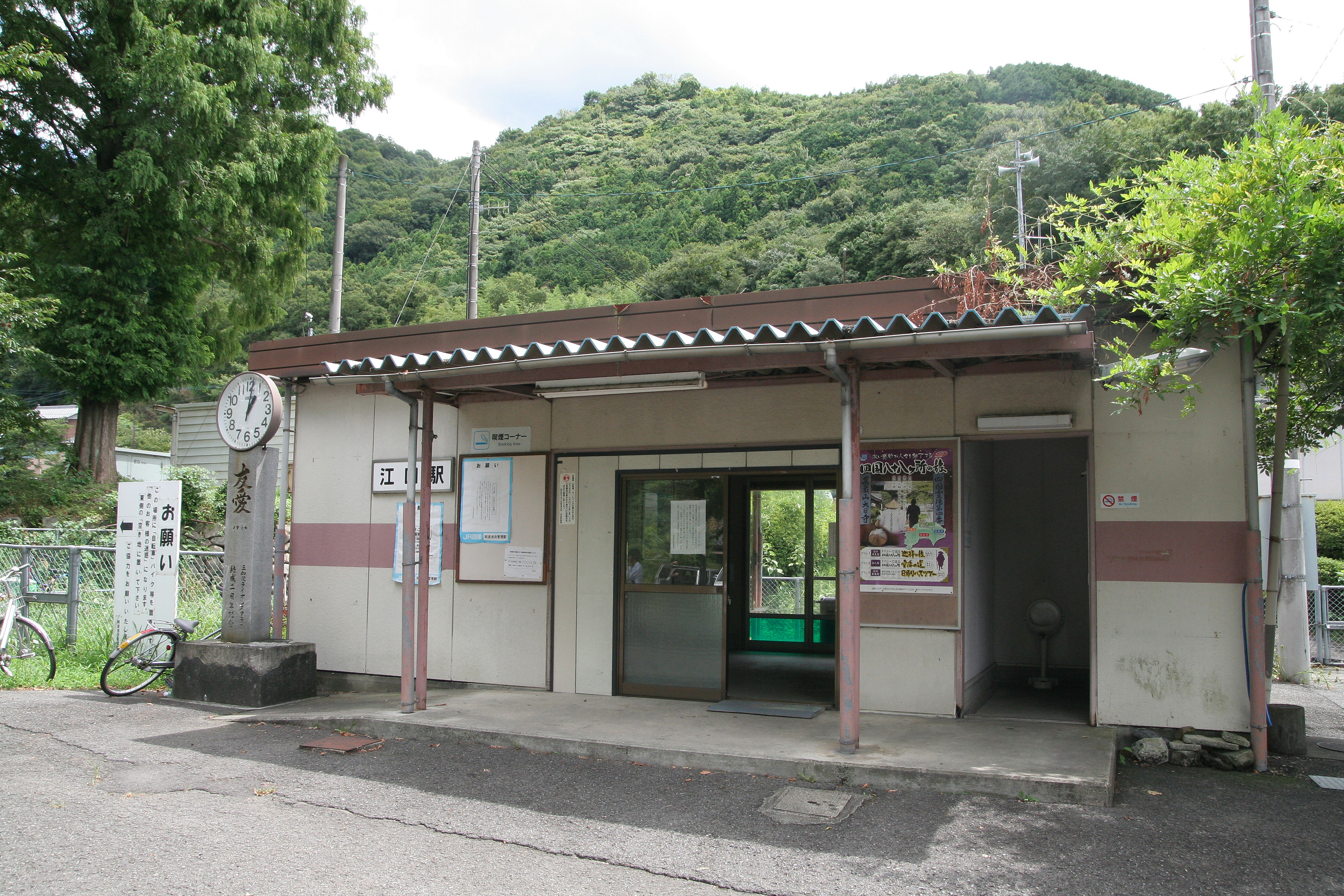
- Eguchi Station in August 2008

General information
- Location: Nakasho, Higashimiyoshi, Miyoshi-gun, Tokushima-ken 779-4703; Japan
- Coordinates: 34°02′14″N 133°58′26″E
- Operator: JR Shikoku
- Line: ■ Tokushima Line
- Distance: 11.2 km from Tsukuda
- Platforms: 1 island platform
- Tracks: 2 + 1 siding

Construction
- Structure type: At grade on sidehill cutting
- Accessible: No - underpass with steps needed to access island platform

Other information
- Status: Unstaffed
- Station code: B20

History
- Opened: 25 March 1914
Location
- Location within Tokushima Prefecture Location within Japan

Eguchi Station (江口駅, Eguchi-eki) is a passenger railway station located in the town of Higashimiyoshi, Miyoshi District, Tokushima Prefecture, Japan. It is operated by JR Shikoku and has the station number "B20".

== Lines ==
Eguchi Station is served by the Tokushima Line and is 11.2 km from the start of the line at Tsukuda. Only local trains stop at the station.

== Layout ==
The station consists of an island platform serving two tracks located on a sidehill cutting. A siding branches off track 1. The station building, located at a lower level than the tracks, is unstaffed and serves only as a waiting room. Outside the station building is the entrance to an underpass with steps which leads to the island platform.

=== Platforms ===
1	■ Tokushima Line	for Anabuki and Tokushima
2	■ Tokushima Line	for Awa-Ikeda

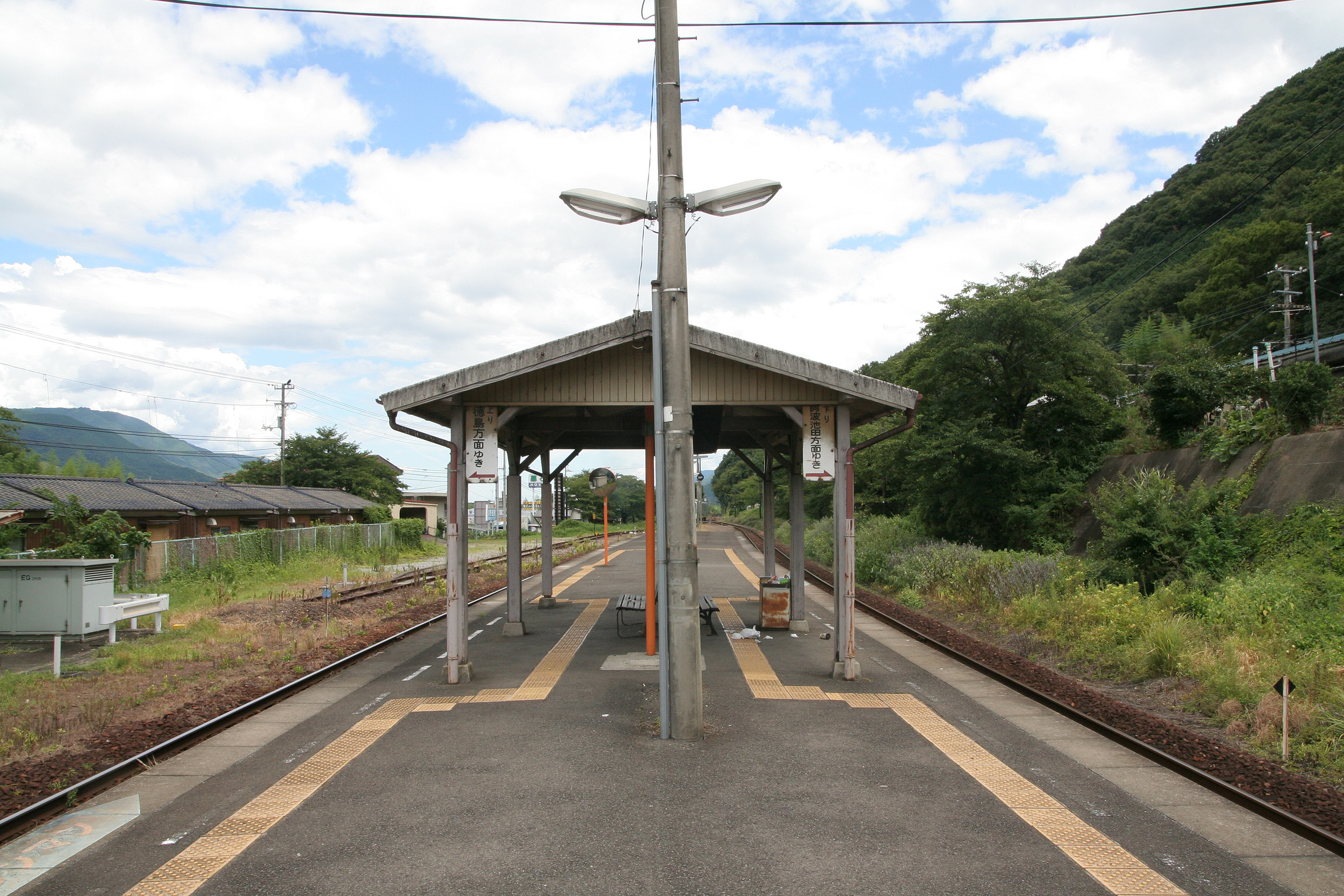
A view of the station platforms. The siding can be seen branching off to the left of the picture.

== Adjacent stations ==
«	Service	»
Tokushima Line
Limited Express Tsurugisan: Does not stop at this station
Mikamo	Local	Awa-Handa

== History ==
Eguchi Station was opened on 25 March 1914 as one of several intermediate stations built when Japanese Government Railways (JGR) extended the track of the Tokushima Main Line from Awa-Yamakawa to Awa-Ikeda. With the privatization of Japanese National Railways (JNR), the successor to JGR, on 1 April 1987, Eguchi came under the control of JR Shikoku. On 1 June 1988, the line was renamed the Tokushima Line.

== Surrounding area ==
- Yoshino River
- Higashimiyoshi Bridge
- Miyoshi City Mino Branch
- Rinka-ji Temple (Ohana Daigongen)

== See also ==
- List of railway stations in Japan
