= Hashikura Prefectural Natural Park =

Prefectural Natural Park in western Tokushima Prefecture, Japan

- 箸蔵県立自然公園
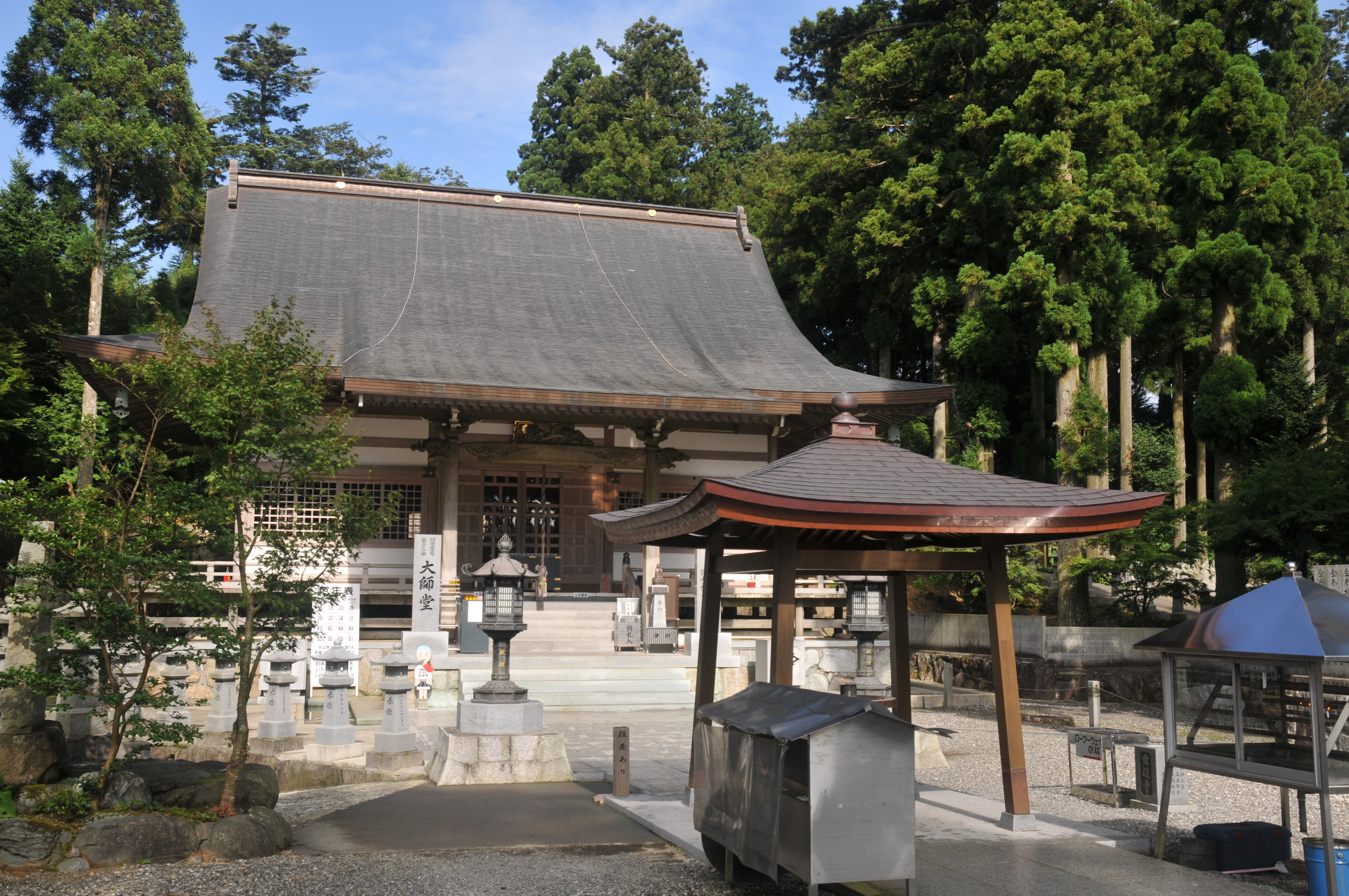
- Unpen-ji

- Location within Tokushima Prefecture Location within Japan
- Location: Tokushima Prefecture, Japan
- Coordinates: 34.065°N 133.825°E
- Area: 11.83 km^{2} (4.57 sq mi)
- Established: 1 January 1967

Hashikura Prefectural Natural Park (箸蔵県立自然公園, Hashikura kenritsu shizen kōen) is a Prefectural Natural Park in western Tokushima Prefecture, Japan. Established in 1967, the park spans the borders of the municipalities of Miyoshi and Higashimiyoshi. The park encompasses a stretch of the Yoshino River as well as the temples of Hashikura-ji (箸蔵寺) and Unpen-ji (雲辺寺), temple 66 on the Shikoku pilgrimage.

== See also ==
- National Parks of Japan
