= Yamashiro, Tokushima =

Dissolved municipality in Tokushima prefecture, Japan

Yamashiro (山城町, Yamashiro-chō) was a town located in Miyoshi District, Tokushima Prefecture, Japan.

As of 2003, the town had an estimated population of 5,220 and a density of 39.67 persons per km^{2}. The total area was 131.59 km^{2}.

On March 1, 2006, Yamashiro, along with the towns of Ikawa, Ikeda and Mino, and the villages of Higashiiyayama and Nishiiyayama (all from Miyoshi District), was merged to create the city of Miyoshi.
