= Higashiiyayama, Tokushima =

Dissolved municipality in Tokushima prefecture, Japan

Higashiiyayama (東祖谷山村, Higashiiyayama-son) was a village located in Miyoshi District, Tokushima Prefecture, Japan.

As of 2003, the village had an estimated population of 2,114 and a density of 9.25 persons per km^{2}. The total area was 228.62 km^{2}.

On March 1, 2006, Higashiiyayama, along with the towns of Ikawa, Ikeda, Mino and Yamashiro, and the village of Nishiiyayama (all from Miyoshi District), was merged to create the city of Miyoshi.

== Geography ==
Situated near the border with Kōchi Prefecture, it has much precipitation, mostly due to the East Asian rainy season. In the winter, there is much snowfall in this mountainous town. Mount Tsurugi, the second highest mountain in Shikoku at 1955 metres is located here.

- Mountains: Mount Tsurugi, Miune
- Rivers: Iya River

== Surrounding municipalities ==
- Tokushima Prefecture
  - Mima
  - Tsurugi
  - Mikamo
  - Nishiiyayama
  - Naka
- Kōchi Prefecture
  - Ōtoyo
  - Monobe
