= Ikawa, Tokushima =

Dissolved municipality in Tokushima prefecture, Japan

Ikawa (井川町, Ikawa-chō) was a town located in Miyoshi District, Tokushima Prefecture, Japan.

As of 2003, the town had an estimated population of 5,044 and a density of 113.35 persons per km^{2}. The total area was 44.5 km^{2}.

On March 1, 2006, Ikawa, along with the towns of Ikeda, Mino and Yamashiro, and the villages of Higashiiyayama and Nishiiyayama (all from Miyoshi District), was merged to create the city of Miyoshi.
