= Awa-Kamo Station =

Railway station in Higashimiyoshi, Tokushima Prefecture, Japan

B22 Awa-Kamo Station 阿波加茂駅
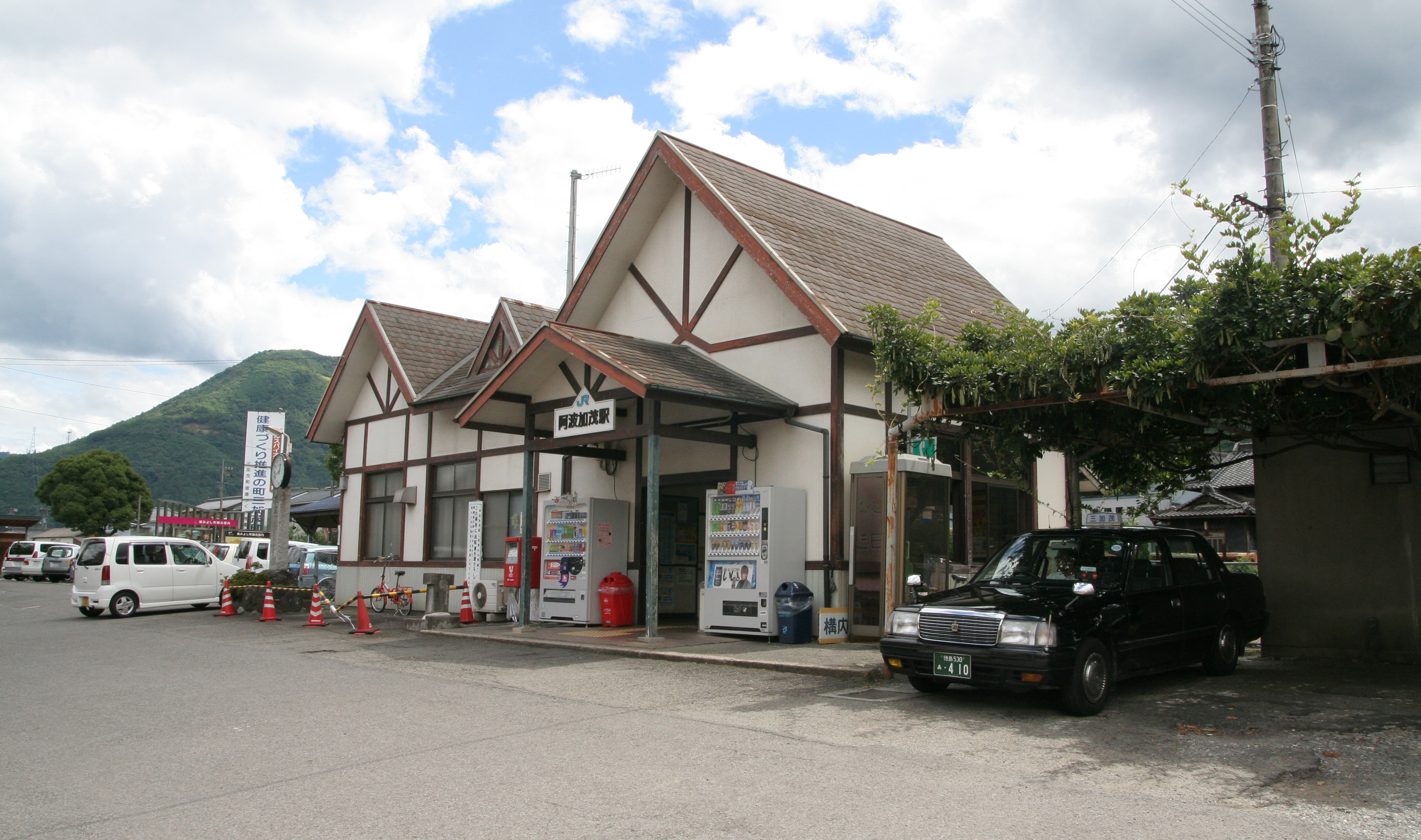
- Awa-Kamo Station in August 2008

General information
- Location: Kamo, Higashimiyoshi, Miyoshi-gun, Tokushima-ken 779-4701; Japan
- Coordinates: 34°02′12″N 133°55′38″E
- Operator: JR Shikoku
- Line: ■ Tokushima Line
- Distance: 6.6 km from Tsukuda
- Platforms: 1 island platform
- Tracks: 2 + 2 sidings

Construction
- Structure type: At grade
- Accessible: No - island platform accessed by footbridge

Other information
- Status: Unstaffed but some types of tickets available from kan'i itaku agent onsite
- Station code: B22

History
- Opened: 25 March 1914

Passengers
- FY2014: 242
Location
- Location within Tokushima Prefecture Location within Japan

Awa-Kamo Station (阿波加茂駅, Awa-Kamo-eki) is a passenger railway station located in the town of Higashimiyoshi, Miyoshi District, Tokushima Prefecture, Japan. It is operated by JR Shikoku and has the station number "B22".

== Lines ==
Awa-Kamo Station is served by the Tokushima Line and is 6.6 km from the beginning of the line at Tsukuda. Besides local trains, the Tsurugisan limited express service also stops at Awa-Kamo.

== Layout ==
The station consists of an island platform serving two tracks. Two sidings branch off the main tracks. Access to the island platform is by means of a footbridge. JR Shikoku closed its ticket window in 2010 but a municipal information centre was set on the station premises in 2012 who sells some types of tickets as a kan'i itaku agent.

=== Platforms ===
1	■ Tokushima Line	for Anabuki and Tokushima
2	■ Tokushima Line	for Awa-Ikeda

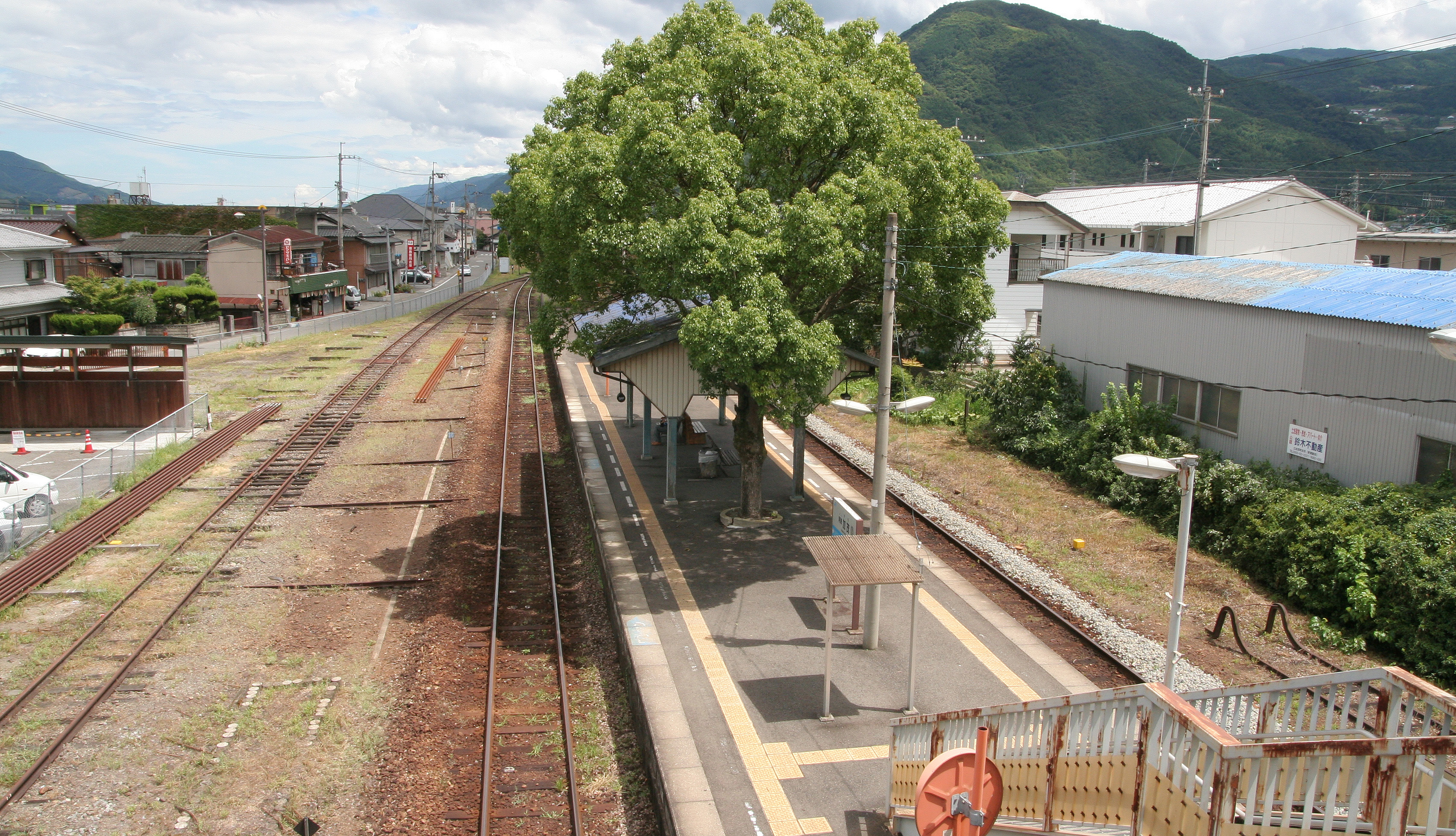
A view of the station platforms and tracks. The siding can be seen to the left.

== Adjacent stations ==
«	Service	»
JR Limited Express Services
Awa-Ikeda	Tsurugisan	Sadamitsu
Tokushima Line
Tsuji	Local	Mikamo

== History ==
Awa-Kamo was opened on 25 March 1914 as one of several intermediate stations built when Japanese Government Railways (JGR) extended the track of the Tokushima Main Line from Awa-Yamakawa to Awa-Ikeda. With the privatization of Japanese National Railways (JNR), the successor to JGR, on 1 April 1987, Awa-Kamo came under the control of JR Shikoku. On 1 June 1988, the line was renamed the Tokushima Line.

In 2012, the local municipal authority set up the Sakura Hiroba Kamo Interaction Centre (加茂ふれあい館さくらひろば, Kamo fureaikan sakura hiroba) which has pamphlets of local attractions, offers bicycle rentals, sells local products and also sells some types of train tickets.

== Surrounding area ==
- Japan National Route 192
- Higashimiyoshi Town Hall

== See also ==
- List of railway stations in Japan
