= Higashimiyoshi =

Higashimiyoshi 東みよし町
- Town
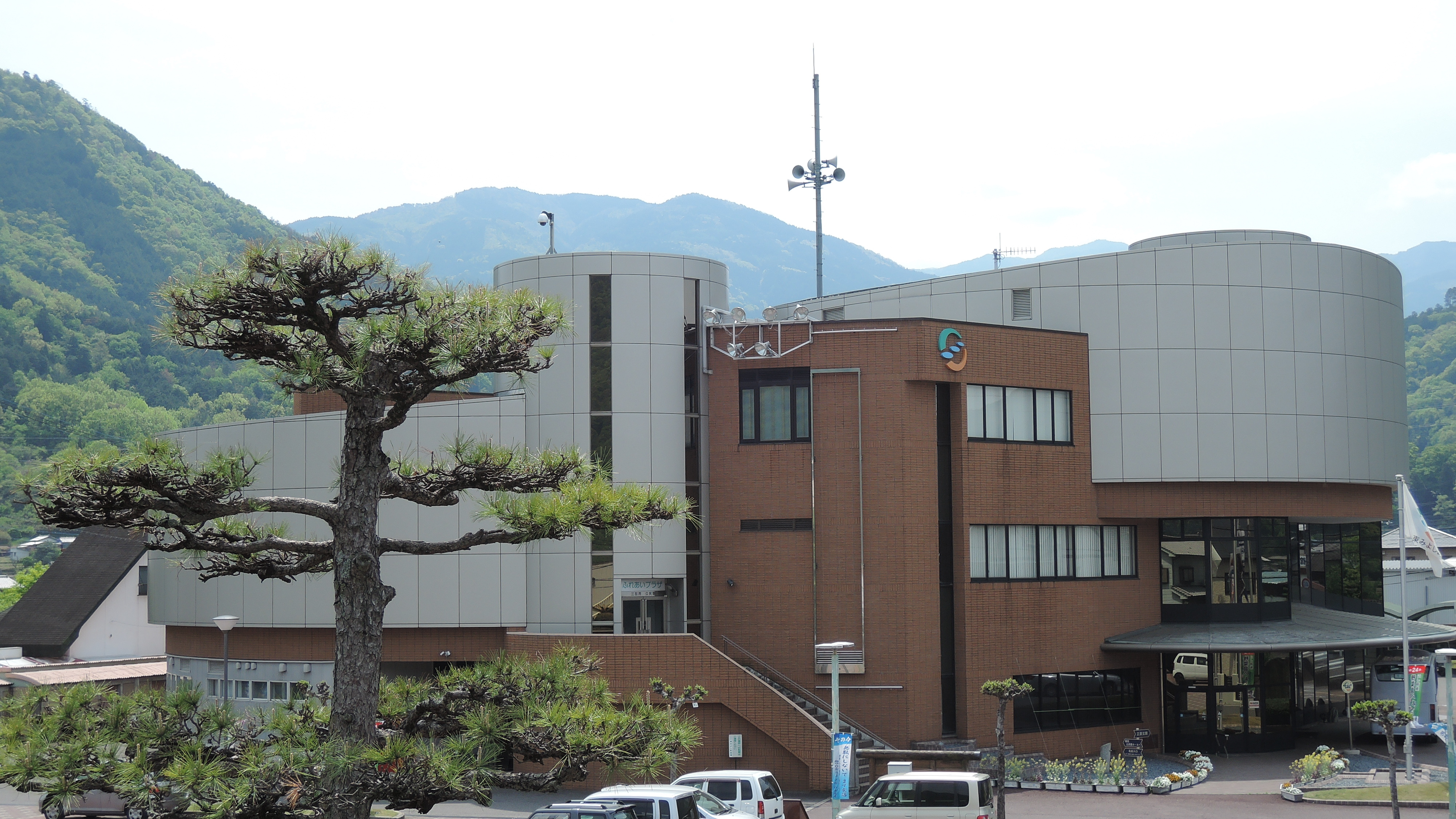
- Higashimiyoshi town hall

- Flag Emblem
- Interactive map of Higashimiyoshi
- Location in Japan
- Coordinates: 34°2′N 133°56′E
- Country: Japan
- Region: Shikoku
- Prefecture: Tokushima
- District: Miyoshi

Government
  - Mayor: Kenji Matsuura

Area
  - Total: 122.48 km^{2} (47.29 sq mi)

Population (June 30, 2022)
  - Total: 13,733
  - Density: 112.12/km^{2} (290.40/sq mi)
- Time zone: UTC+09:00 (JST)
- City hall address: 3360 Kamo, Higashimiyoshi-cho, Miyoshi-gun, Tokushima-ken 779-4795
- Website: Official website
- Symbols
- Flower: Salvia
- Tree: Camphor

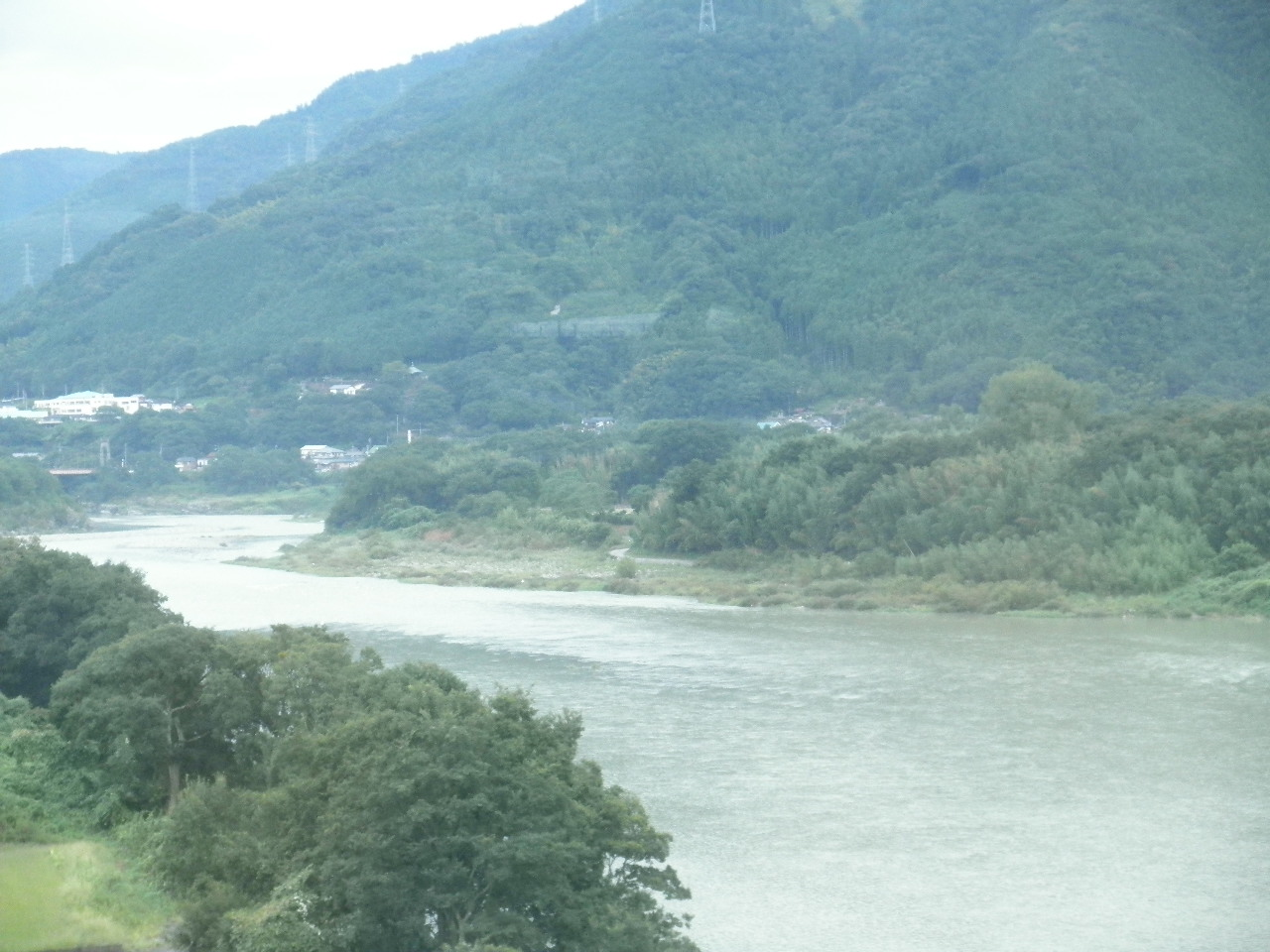
Yoshino River in Higashimiyoshi

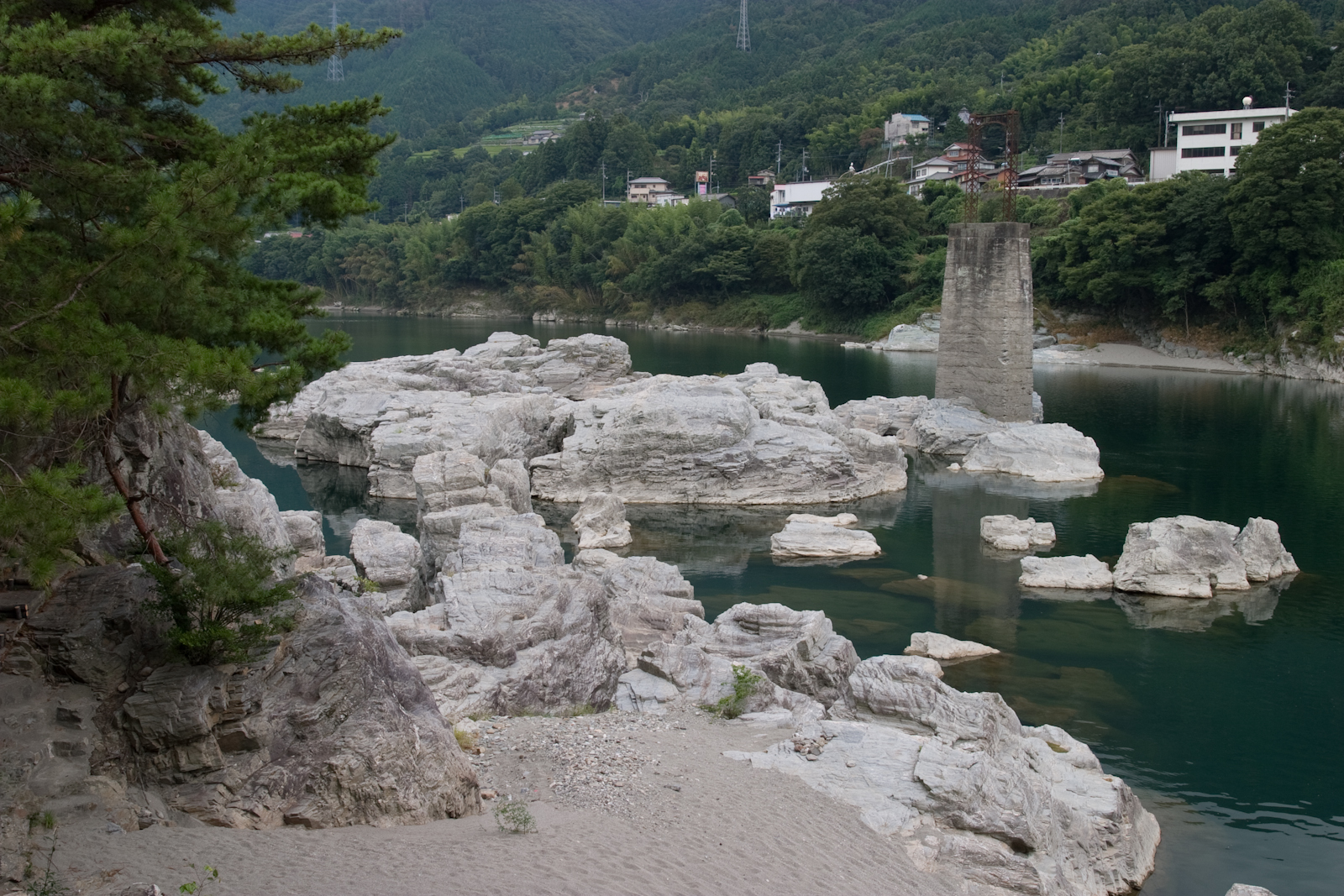
Minoda Gorge

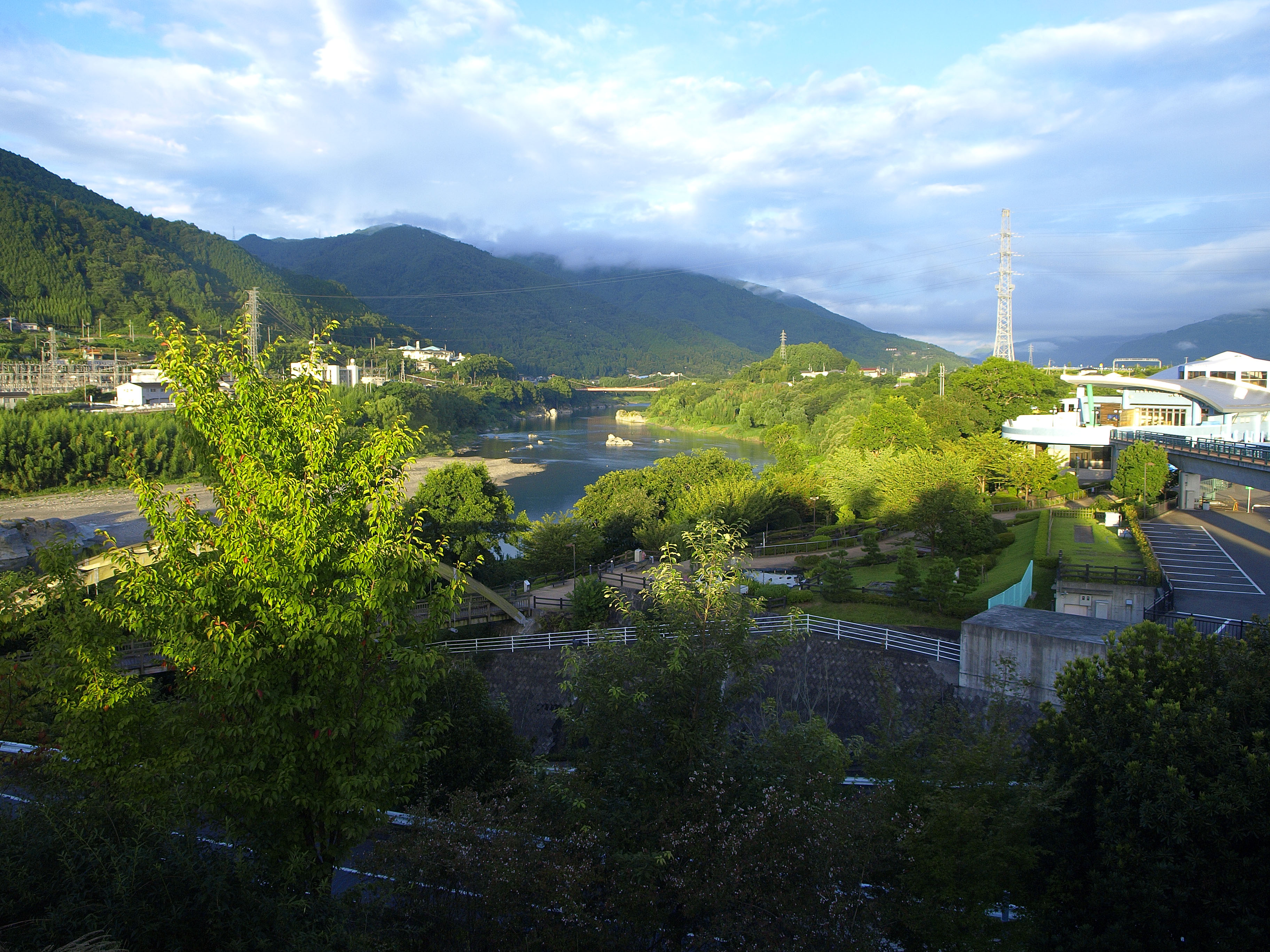
Yoshinogawa Highway Oasis

Higashimiyoshi (東みよし町, Higashimiyoshi-chō) is a town located in Miyoshi District, Tokushima Prefecture, Japan. As of 30 June 2022, the town had an estimated population of 13,733 in 6281 households and a population density of 110 persons per km^{2}. The total area of the town is 122.48 square kilometres (47.29 sq mi).

== Geography ==
Higashimiyoshi is located in northwestern part of Tokushima Prefecture on the island of Shikoku. It is situated on the north side of the middle reaches of the Yoshino River in mountainous region bordered by Kagawa Prefecture to the north. The Hashikura Prefectural Natural Park spans the border between Miyoshi and Higashimiyoshi.

=== Neighbouring municipalities ===
Kagawa Prefecture

- Mannō
- Mitoyo

Tokushima Prefecture

- Mima
- Miyoshi
- Tsurugi

=== Climate ===
Higashimiyoshi has a humid subtropical climate (Köppen Cfa) characterized by warm summers and cool winters with light snowfall. The average annual temperature in Higashimiyoshi is 13.0 °C. The average annual rainfall is 2104 mm with September as the wettest month. The temperatures are highest on average in August, at around 24.3 °C, and lowest in January, at around 1.8 °C.

== Demographics ==
Per Japanese census data, the population of Higashimiyoshi peaked around the year 1950 and has declined since.

Historical population
Year	Pop.	±%
1920	17,686	—
1930	19,075	+7.9%
1940	18,641	−2.3%
1950	22,928	+23.0%
1960	20,400	−11.0%
1970	16,176	−20.7%
1980	15,610	−3.5%
1990	15,908	+1.9%
2000	16,199	+1.8%
2010	15,044	−7.1%
2020	13,622	−9.5%

== History ==
As with all of Tokushima Prefecture, the area of Higashimiyoshi was part of ancient Awa Province. Miyoshi District is mentioned in Heian period records, and from the Muromachi period, was the home territory of the Miyoshi clan. During the Edo period, the area was part of the holdings of Tokushima Domain ruled by the Hachisuka clan from their seat at Tokushima Castle. The village of Hiruma (昼間町) was established within Miyoshi District with the creation of the modern municipalities system on October 1, 1889. It was raised to town status on October 1, 1925. After merging with the village of Ashiru on March 21, 1955, it became the town of Miyoshi. On March 1, 2006, Miyoshi merged with the town of Mikamo to form the town of Higashimiyoshi.

== Government ==
Higashimiyoshi has a mayor-council form of government with a directly elected mayor and a unicameral town council of 14 members. Higashimiyoshi, together with the other municipalities of Miyoshi District, contributes one member to the Tokushima Prefectural Assembly. In terms of national politics, the town is part of Tokushima 2nd district of the lower house of the Diet of Japan.

== Economy ==
Higashimiyoshi has an economy based on agriculture and forestry.

== Education ==
Higashimiyoshi has four public elementary schools and two public middle schools operated by the town government. The town does not have a high school.

== Transportation ==
=== Railway ===
JR Shikoku - Tokushima Line

- Eguchi - Mikamo - Awa-Kamo

=== Highways ===
- Tokushima Expressway
- National Route 192

== Local attractions ==
- Asan Circuit race course
- Hashikura Prefectural Natural Park
- Tanda Kofun, National Historic Site

== Notable people from Higashimiyoshi ==
- Kazuo Taoka, former yakuza godfather
