= Nishiiyayama, Tokushima =

Dissolved municipality in Tokushima prefecture, Japan

Nishiiyayama (西祖谷山村, Nishiiyayama-son) was a village located in Miyoshi District, Tokushima Prefecture, Japan.

As of 2003, the village had an estimated population of 1,840 and a density of 17.35 persons per km^{2}. The total area was 106.06 km^{2}.

On March 1, 2006, Nishiiyayama, along with the towns of Ikawa, Ikeda, Mino and Yamashiro, and the village of Higashiiyayama (all from Miyoshi District), was merged to create the city of Miyoshi.
