= Ikeda, Tokushima =

Dissolved municipality in Tokushima prefecture, Japan

Ikeda (池田町, Ikeda-chō) was a town located in Miyoshi District, Tokushima Prefecture, Japan.

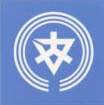
Emblem

As of 2003, the town had an estimated population of 16,236 and a density of 96.76 persons per km^{2}. The total area was 167.8 km^{2}.

On March 1, 2006, Ikeda, along with the towns of Ikawa, Mino and Yamashiro, and the villages of Higashiiyayama and Nishiiyayama (all from Miyoshi District), was merged to create the city of Miyoshi.
