= Naoji Miyauchi =

Japanese baseball player

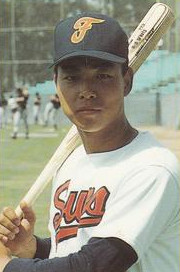
- Miyauchi in 1988
- Outfielder
- Born: June 19, 1967 (age 57); Miyoshi-gun, Tokushima Japan
- Batted: Right Threw: Right

debut
- 1989, for the Hanshin Tigers

Last appearance
- 1993, for the Hanshin Tigers

Career statistics
- Batting average: .215
- Home runs: 5
- Runs batted in: 12

Teams
- Hanshin Tigers (1989–1991, 1993)

Naoji "Hector" Miyauchi (born June 19, 1967) played with the Hanshin Tigers in Nippon Professional Baseball in four seasons and also spent two years in American minor league baseball.

He was born in Miyoshi-gun, Tokushima Japan and attended Ikeda High School.

He played for the Fresno Suns of the California League in 1988 and hit .208 with four home runs and 10 RBI in 41 games. In 106 at-bats, he struck out 35 times. With the Tigers of Nippon Professional Baseball in 1989, he went hitless in nine at-bats.

Miyauchi slashed .333/.355/.467 in 30 at-bats over 18 games with Hanshin in 1990. In 1991, he hit .267 with five home runs in 120 plate appearances in 74 games. He was 1 for 1 with Hanshin in 1993 and spent all of 1994 in the Japanese minors.

He surfaced again in 1995, playing in 16 games for the GCL Expos. He hit .233 with a home run, two RBI and three stolen bases. Overall, he batted .215 with 26 hits, five home runs and 12 RBI in the United States and .269 with 39 hits, five home runs and 15 RBI in Nippon Professional Baseball.
