= Unpen-ji =

- 雲辺寺
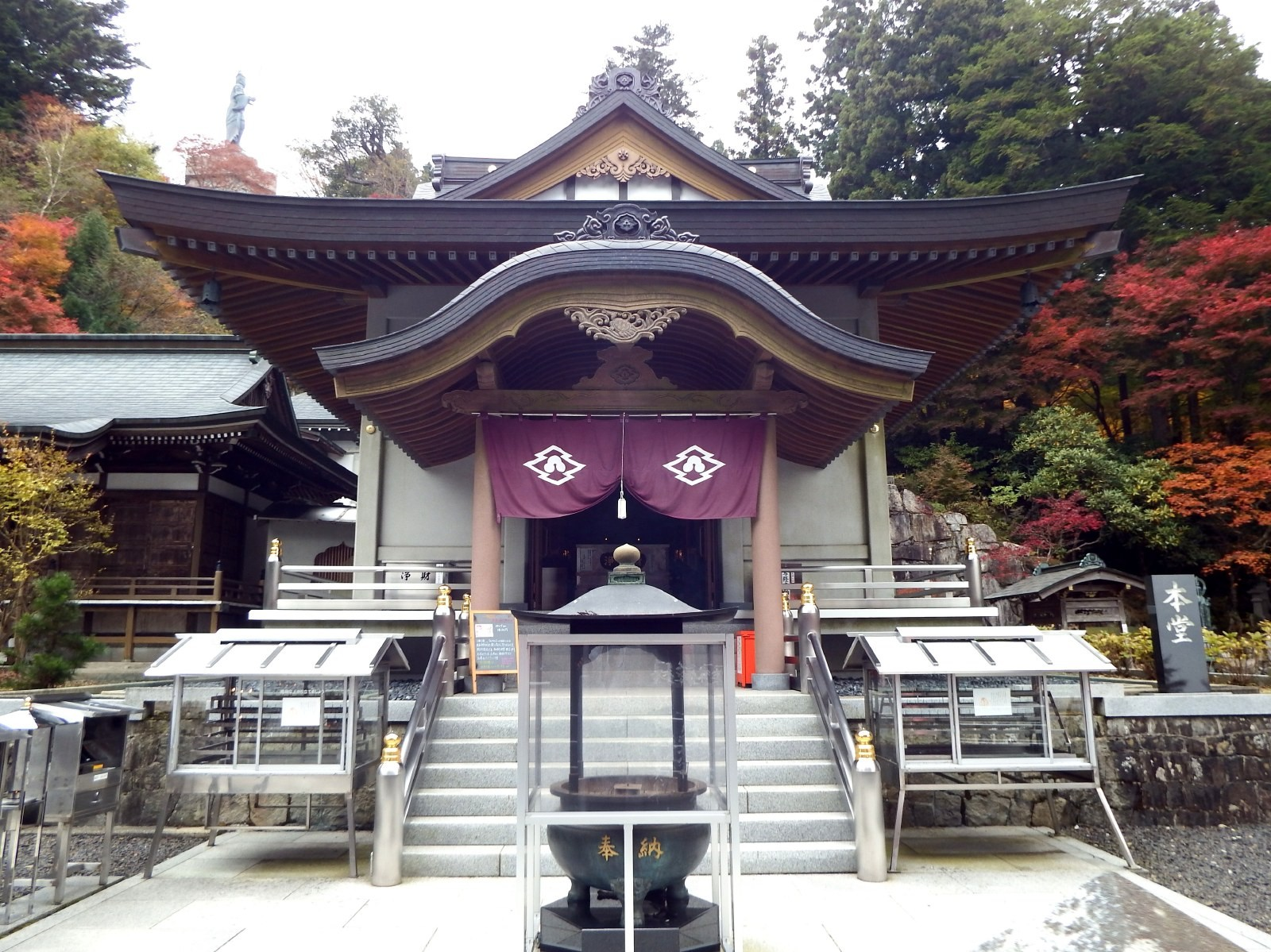

Religion
- Affiliation: Shingon Omuro
- Deity: Senju Kannon

Location
- Location: Miyoshi, Tokushima
- Country: Japan
- Interactive map of Unpen-ji
- Coordinates: 34°2′6.8″N 133°43′25.4″E

Architecture
- Founder: Kukai
- Completed: 789

Unpen-ji (雲辺寺) is a Shingon Buddhist temple in Miyoshi, Tokushima. It is the 66th temple in the 88 temple Shikoku Pilgrimage. It is the highest point in the Shikoku pilgrimage, at 927 meters elevation.

== Access ==
The temple is accessible by foot, the Unpenji Ropeway, or by car.

== Gallery ==
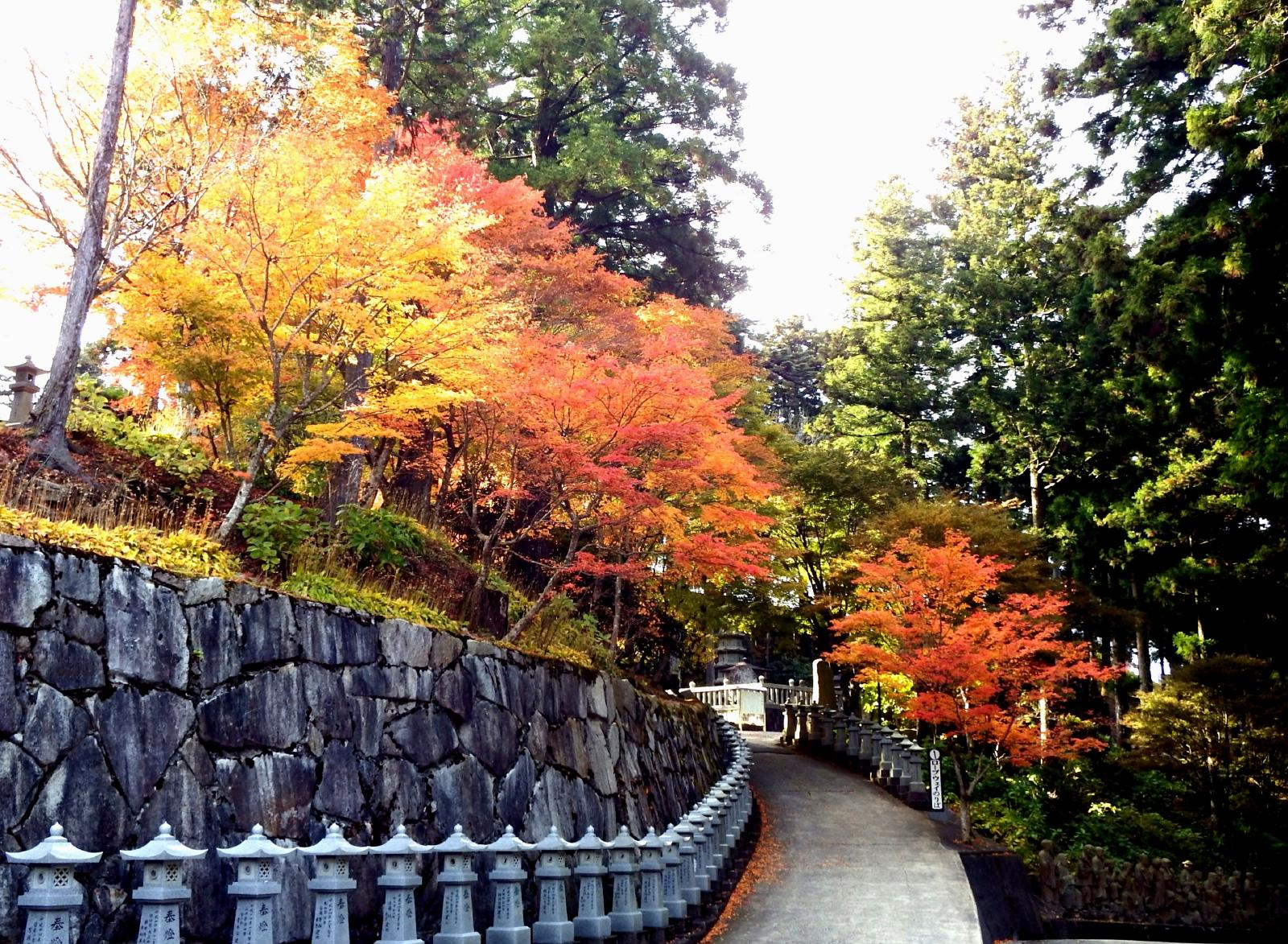
Path leading to the temple in Autumn

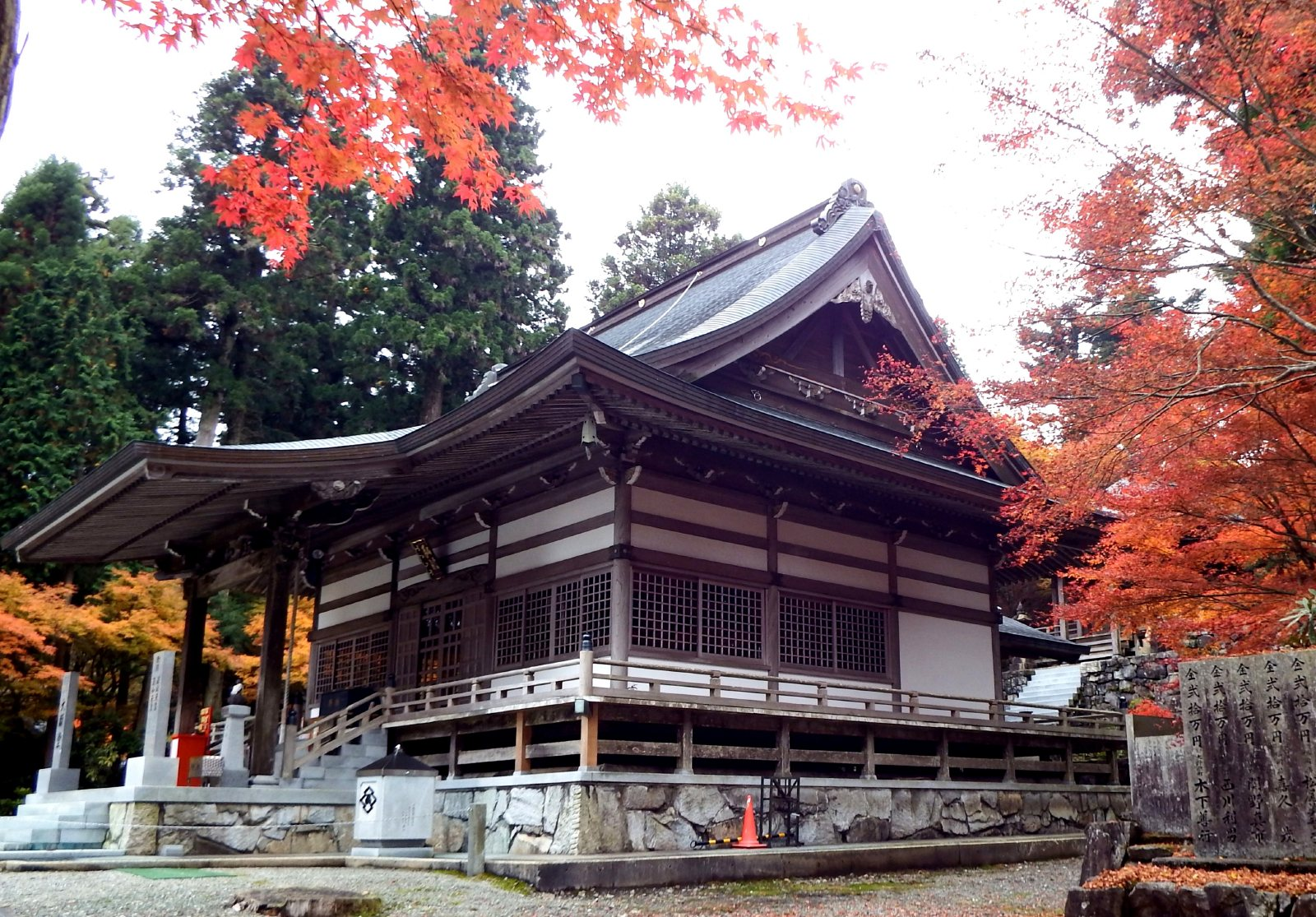
Daishido

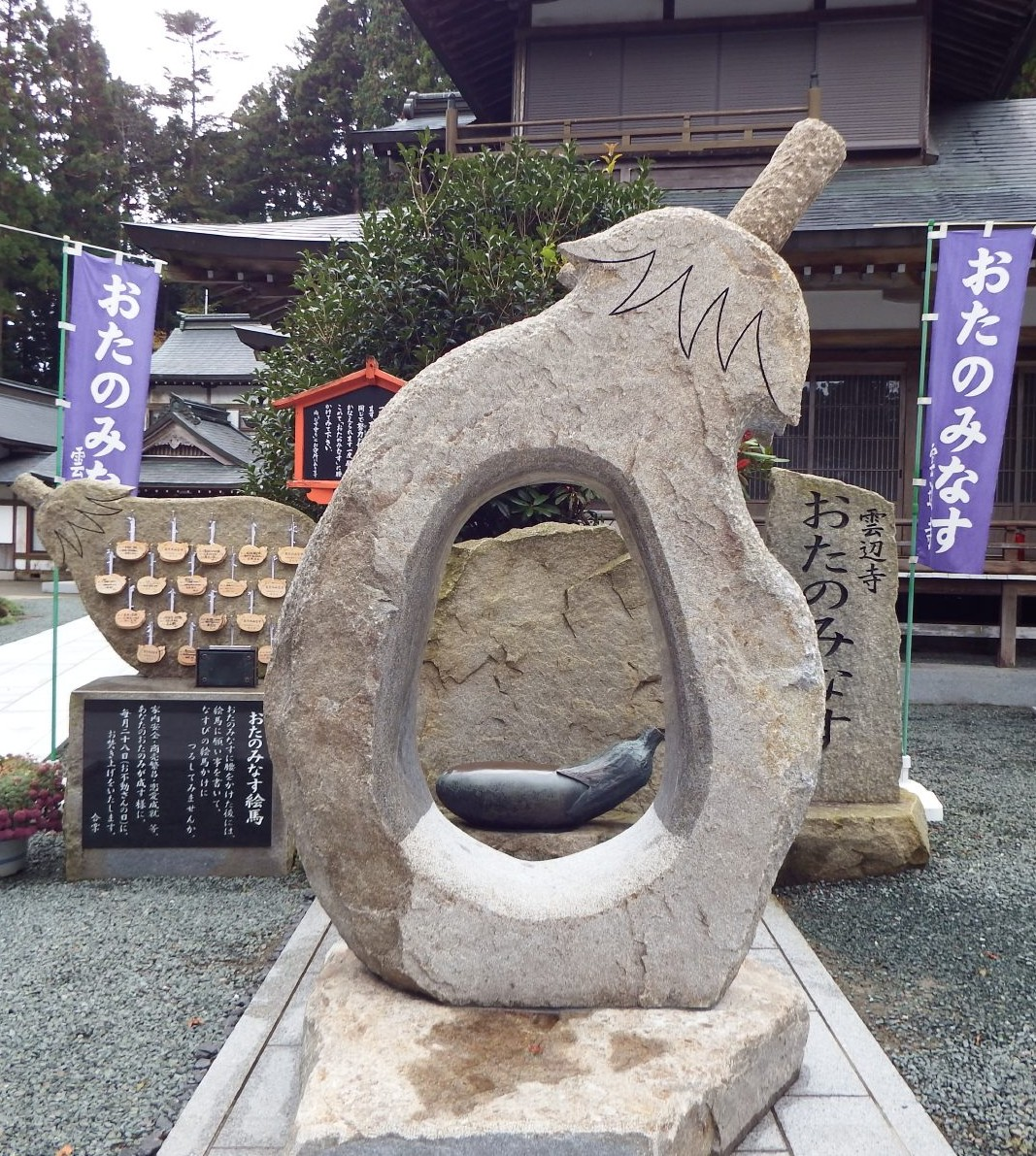
Wish Eggplant

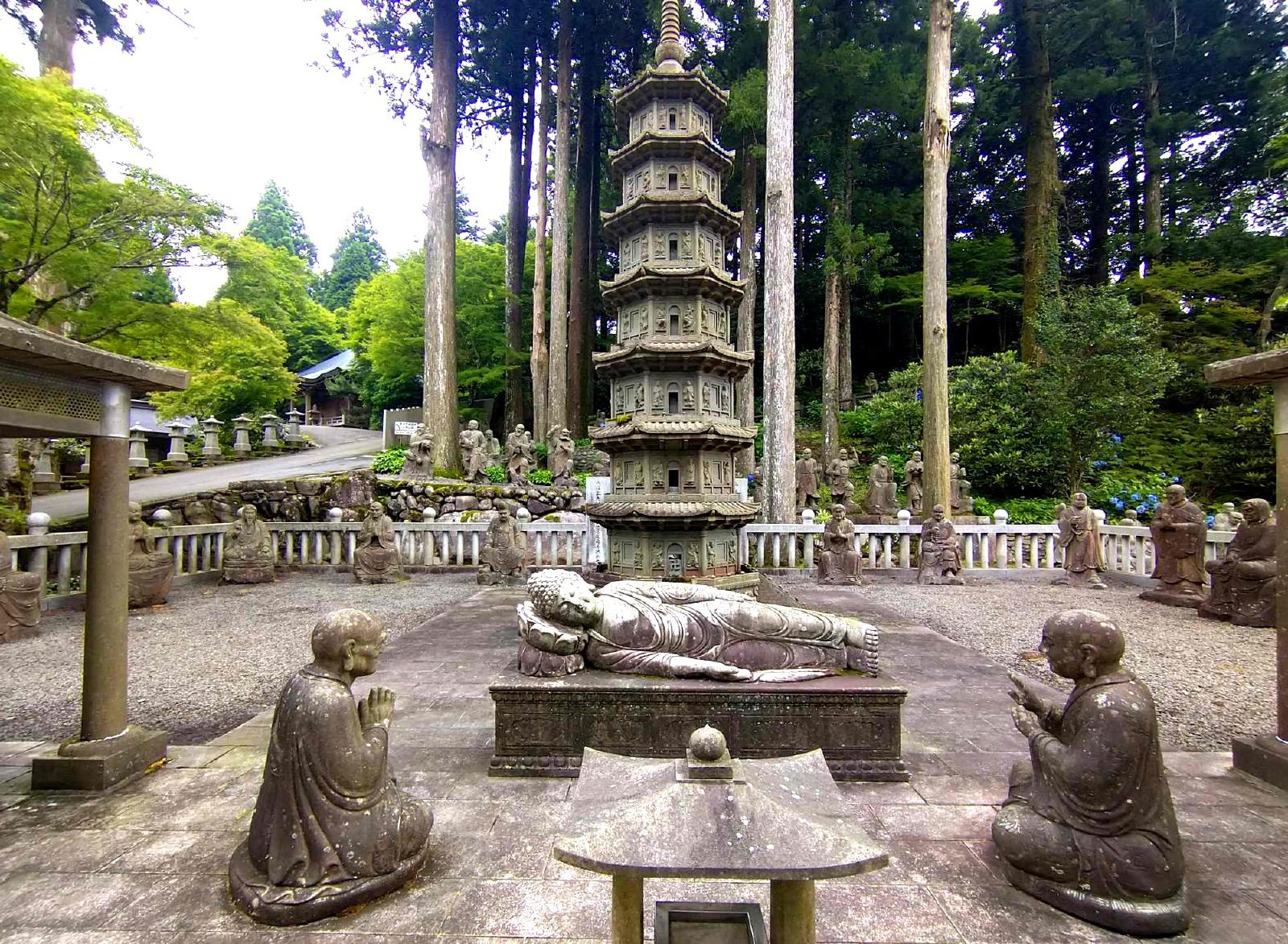
Nehan Shakyamuni

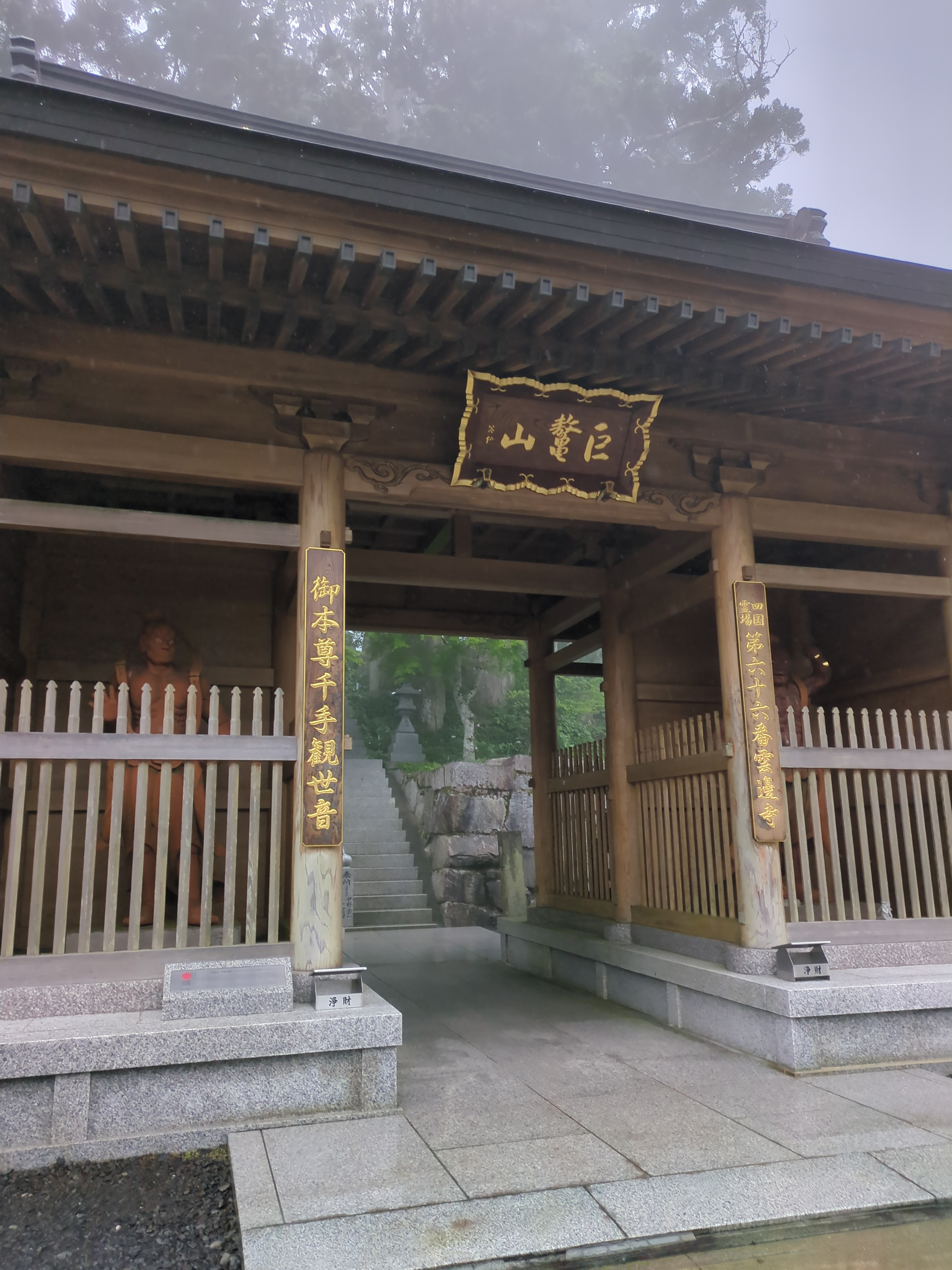
Nio gate

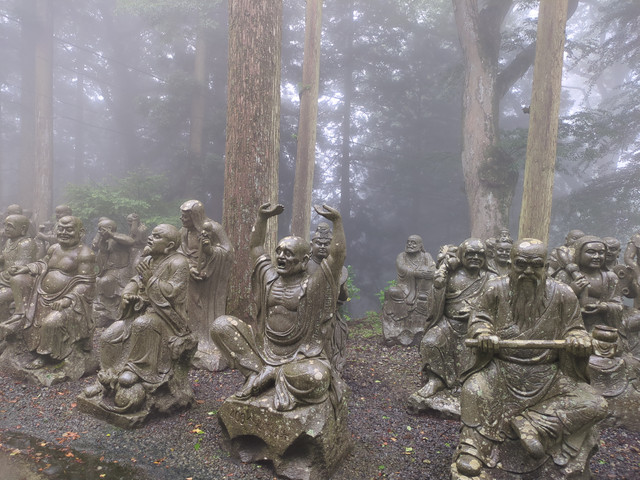
500 arhats statues
