= Mino, Tokushima =

Town in Tokushima japan

Mino (三野町, Mino-chō) was a town located in Miyoshi District, Tokushima Prefecture, Japan.

As of 2003, the town had an estimated population of 5,223 and a density of 121.35 persons per km^{2}. The total area was 43.04 km^{2}.

On March 1, 2006, Mino, along with the towns of Ikawa, Ikeda and Yamashiro, and the villages of Higashiiyayama and Nishiiyayama (all from Miyoshi District), was merged to create the city of Miyoshi.
