= Miyoshi, Tokushima =

Miyoshi 三好市
- City
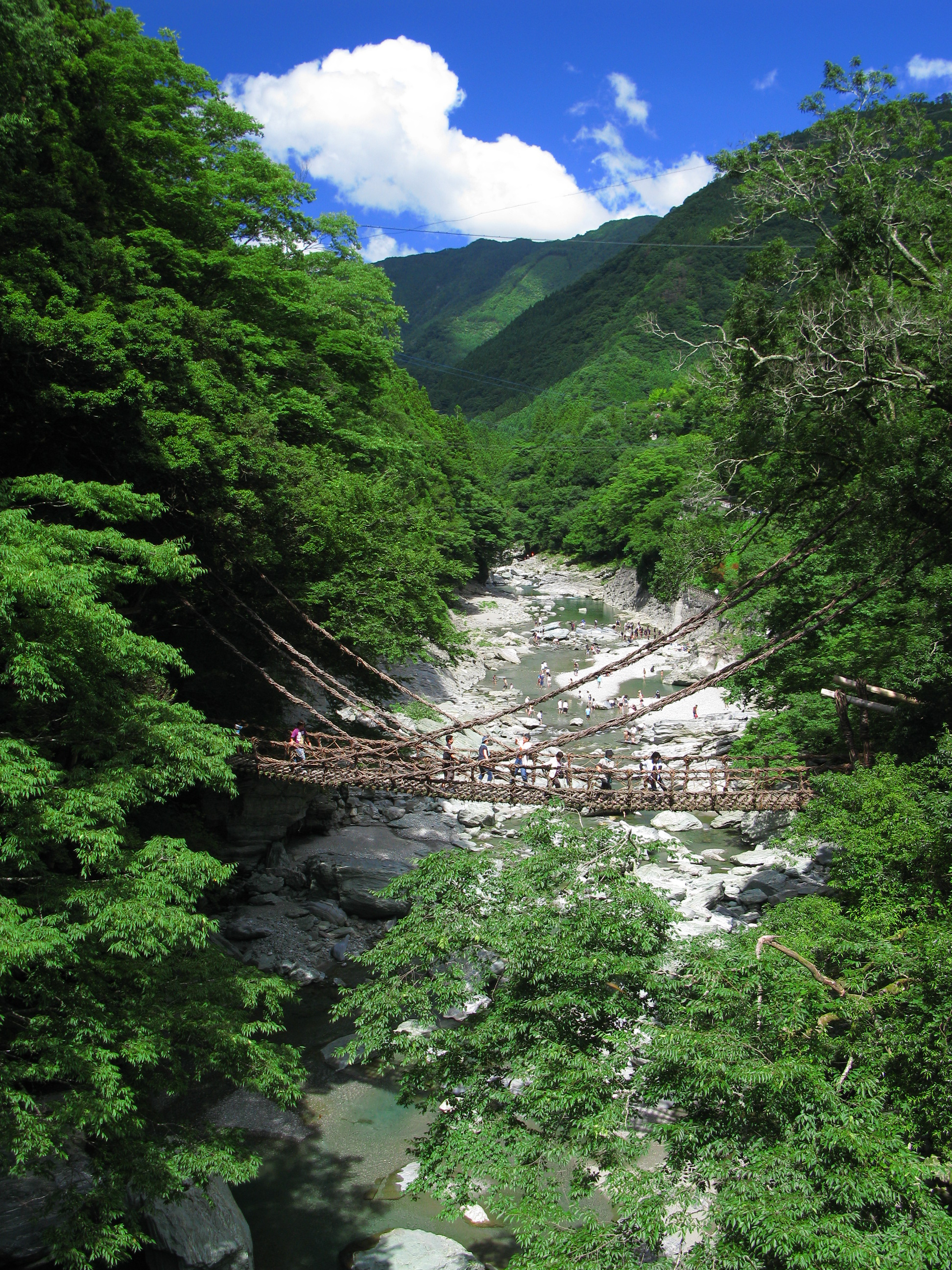
- Kazura Bridge, a popular sightseeing spot in Miyoshi

- Flag Emblem

- Location of Miyoshi in Tokushima Prefecture

- Location in Japan
- Coordinates: 34°01′33.7″N 133°48′25.8″E
- Country: Japan
- Region: Shikoku
- Prefecture: Tokushima

Government
  - Mayor: Miho Takai (since July 2021)

Area
  - Total: 721.42 km^{2} (278.54 sq mi)

Population (September 1, 2025)
  - Total: 20,518
  - Density: 28.441/km^{2} (73.662/sq mi)
- Time zone: UTC+09:00 (JST)
- City hall address: Ikeda Shinmachi 1500-2, Miyoshi-shi, Tokushima-ken 778-8501
- Climate: Cfa
- Website: Official website
- Symbols
- Bird: Japanese white-eye
- Flower: Habenaria radiata
- Tree: Maple leaf

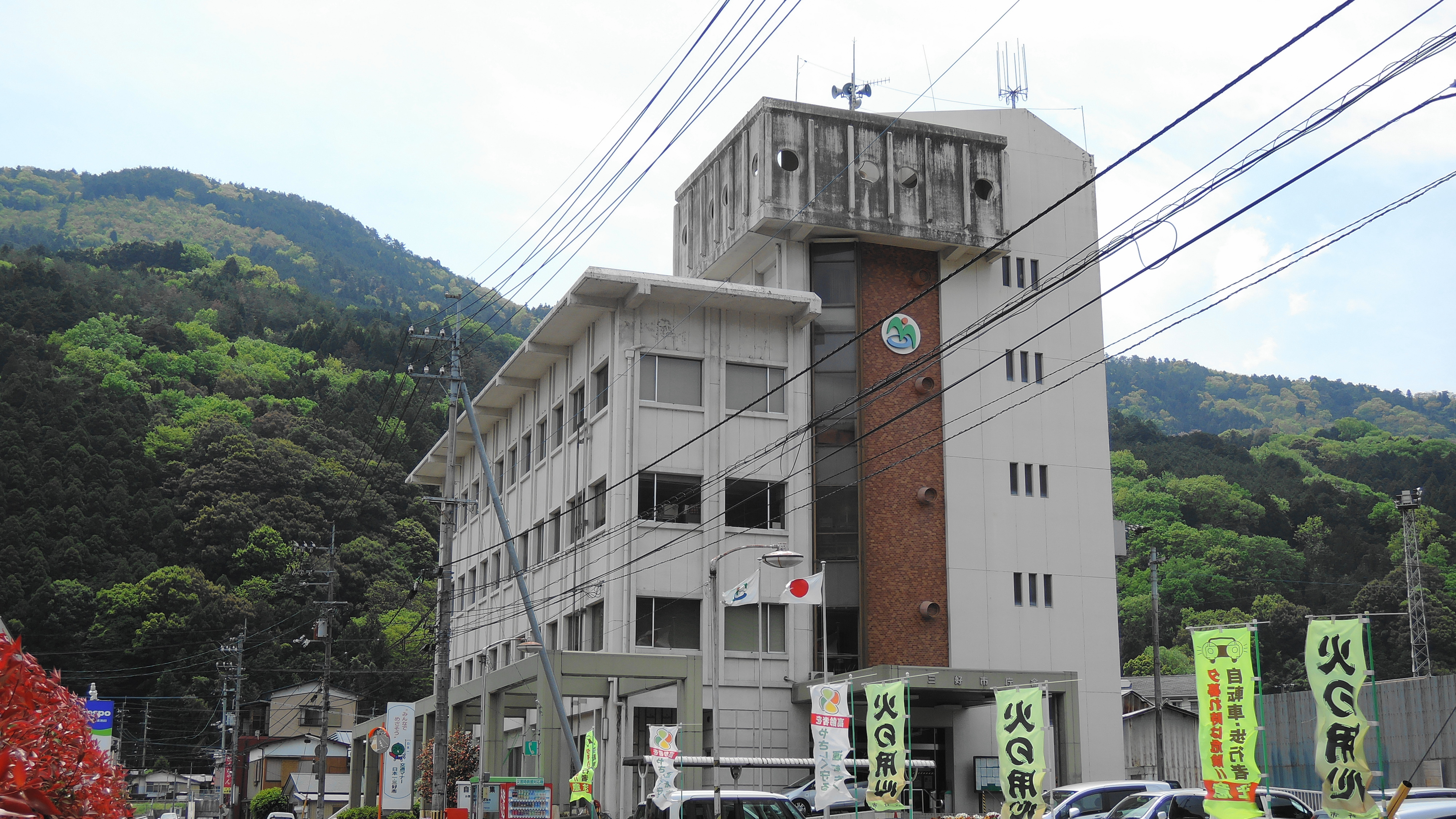
Miyoshi City Hall

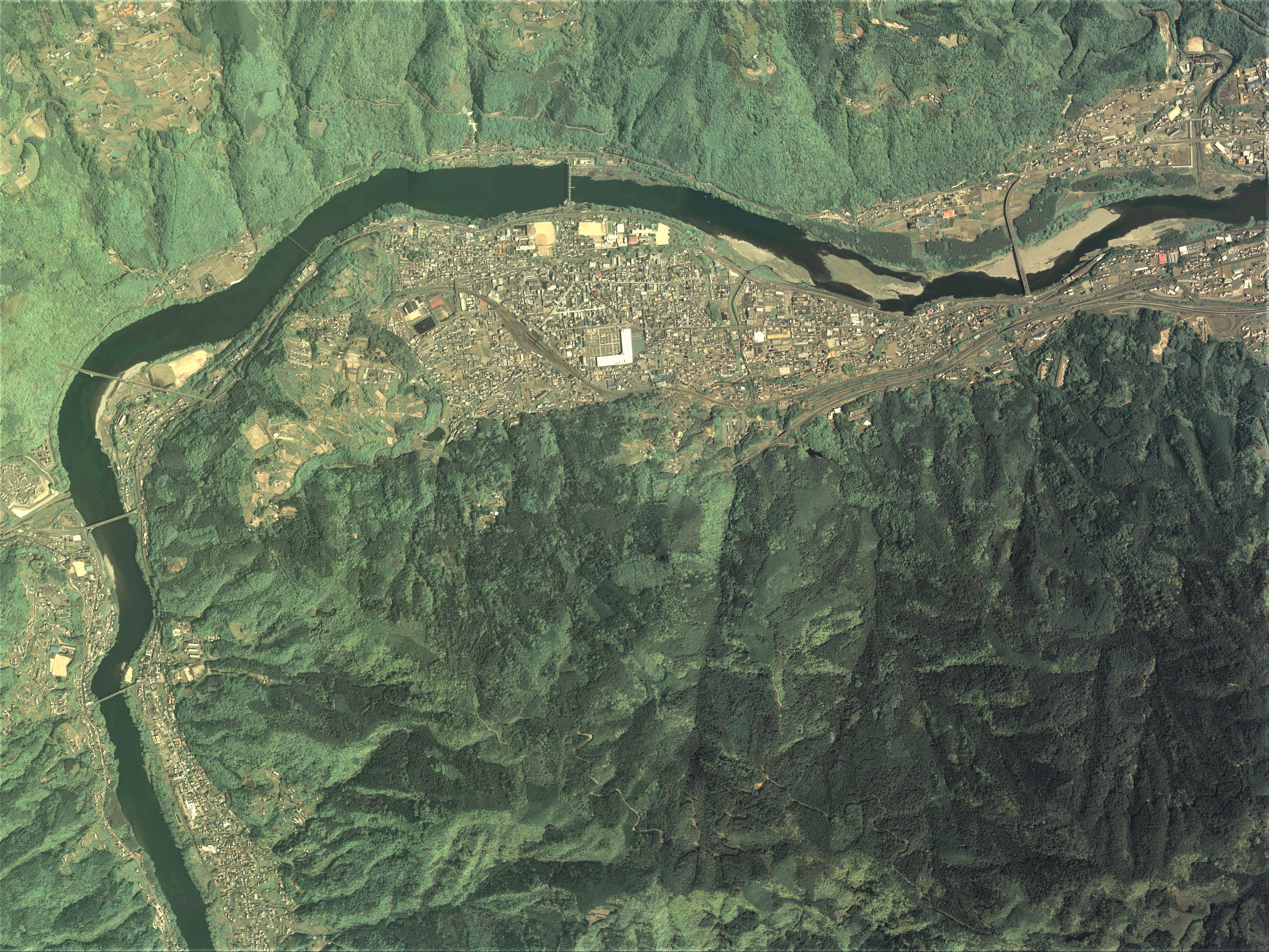
Aerial view of Ikeda district of Miyoshi

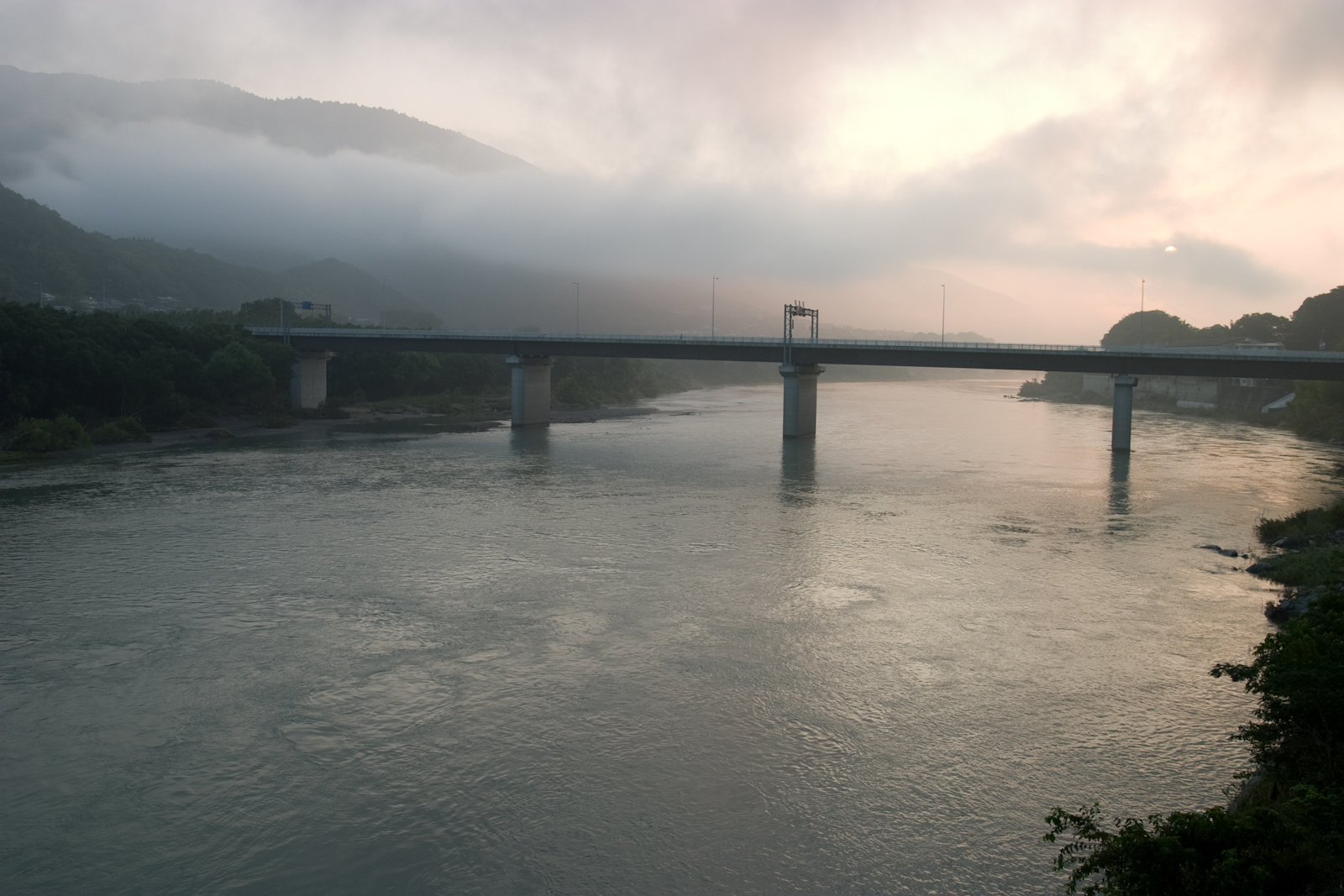
Yoshino River in Miyoshi

Miyoshi (三好市, Miyoshi-shi) is a city located in Tokushima Prefecture, Japan. As of 1 September 2025, the city had an estimated population of 20,518 and a population density of 28.4 persons per km^{2}. The total area of the city is 721.42 square kilometres (278.54 sq mi).

== Geography ==
Miyoshi is located in the western part of Tokushima Prefecture and is the largest municipality on the island of Shikoku, accounting for 1/6 of the prefecture's geographic area. However, it is a very mountainous area with only 13% considered habitable. The Shikoku Mountains have many steep slopes and are subject to landslides and rockfalls. Traditional steep slope farming methods are used to prevent soil erosion. The Hashikura Prefectural Natural Park spans the border between Miyoshi and Higashimiyoshi.

=== Neighbouring municipalities ===
Ehime Prefecture

- Shikokuchūō

Kagawa Prefecture

- Kan'onji
- Mannō
- Mitoyo

Kōchi Prefecture

- Kami
- Ōtoyo, Kōchi

Tokushima Prefecture

- Higashimiyoshi
- Mima
- Naka
- Tsurugi

=== Climate ===
Miyoshi has a humid subtropical climate (Köppen climate classification Cfa) with hot summers and cool winters. Precipitation is high, but there is a pronounced difference between the wetter summers and drier winters. The average annual temperature in Miyoshi is 14.3 °C (57.7 °F). The average annual rainfall is 1,497.5 mm (58.96 in) with September as the wettest month. The temperatures are highest on average in August, at around 25.6 °C (78.1 °F), and lowest in January, at around 3.5 °C (38.3 °F). The highest temperature ever recorded in Miyoshi was 38.0 °C (100.4 °F) on 3 August 2026; the coldest temperature ever recorded was −11.5 °C (11.3 °F) on 28 February 1981.

Climate data for Ikeda, Miyoshi (1991–2020 normals, extremes 1978–present)
Month	Jan	Feb	Mar	Apr	May	Jun	Jul	Aug	Sep	Oct	Nov	Dec	Year
Record high °C (°F)	18.8 (65.8)	24.4 (75.9)	26.2 (79.2)	30.9 (87.6)	33.1 (91.6)	35.0 (95.0)	37.3 (99.1)	38.0 (100.4)	36.2 (97.2)	30.7 (87.3)	26.5 (79.7)	23.1 (73.6)	38.0 (100.4)
Mean daily maximum °C (°F)	8.0 (46.4)	9.3 (48.7)	13.3 (55.9)	19.3 (66.7)	24.1 (75.4)	26.6 (79.9)	30.5 (86.9)	31.6 (88.9)	27.3 (81.1)	21.6 (70.9)	15.9 (60.6)	10.4 (50.7)	19.8 (67.7)
Daily mean °C (°F)	3.5 (38.3)	4.2 (39.6)	7.5 (45.5)	13.0 (55.4)	17.7 (63.9)	21.2 (70.2)	25.1 (77.2)	25.6 (78.1)	21.8 (71.2)	16.0 (60.8)	10.5 (50.9)	5.6 (42.1)	14.3 (57.8)
Mean daily minimum °C (°F)	−0.3 (31.5)	−0.3 (31.5)	2.3 (36.1)	7.1 (44.8)	12.0 (53.6)	16.9 (62.4)	21.1 (70.0)	21.5 (70.7)	17.8 (64.0)	11.8 (53.2)	6.1 (43.0)	1.7 (35.1)	9.8 (49.7)
Record low °C (°F)	−6.0 (21.2)	−7.9 (17.8)	−5.1 (22.8)	−2.4 (27.7)	2.3 (36.1)	8.2 (46.8)	13.6 (56.5)	14.6 (58.3)	7.5 (45.5)	1.3 (34.3)	−1.4 (29.5)	−5.1 (22.8)	−7.9 (17.8)
Average precipitation mm (inches)	56.5 (2.22)	60.9 (2.40)	94.5 (3.72)	86.1 (3.39)	124.6 (4.91)	197.6 (7.78)	211.5 (8.33)	169.2 (6.66)	222.1 (8.74)	136.8 (5.39)	78.6 (3.09)	84.6 (3.33)	1,497.5 (58.96)
Average precipitation days (≥ 1.0 mm)	9.9	10.0	11.9	10.0	9.8	12.6	11.9	10.3	11.0	9.2	8.7	10.8	126.1
Mean monthly sunshine hours	102.5	113.9	157.3	188.1	198.9	138.5	177.5	200.3	144.3	151.8	124.5	101.6	1,799.4
Source: Japan Meteorological Agency

Climate data for Higashiiyakyojo, Miyoshi (1991–2020 normals, extremes 1978–present)
Month	Jan	Feb	Mar	Apr	May	Jun	Jul	Aug	Sep	Oct	Nov	Dec	Year
Record high °C (°F)	17.9 (64.2)	22.9 (73.2)	26.4 (79.5)	29.8 (85.6)	31.6 (88.9)	35.1 (95.2)	35.7 (96.3)	36.1 (97.0)	33.4 (92.1)	30.4 (86.7)	25.3 (77.5)	21.5 (70.7)	36.1 (97.0)
Mean daily maximum °C (°F)	6.5 (43.7)	8.0 (46.4)	12.3 (54.1)	18.1 (64.6)	22.6 (72.7)	25.1 (77.2)	28.8 (83.8)	29.6 (85.3)	25.8 (78.4)	20.5 (68.9)	15.0 (59.0)	9.0 (48.2)	18.4 (65.2)
Daily mean °C (°F)	1.4 (34.5)	2.4 (36.3)	5.9 (42.6)	11.1 (52.0)	15.6 (60.1)	19.1 (66.4)	22.8 (73.0)	23.2 (73.8)	19.8 (67.6)	14.1 (57.4)	8.6 (47.5)	3.5 (38.3)	12.3 (54.1)
Mean daily minimum °C (°F)	−2.1 (28.2)	−1.8 (28.8)	0.8 (33.4)	5.2 (41.4)	9.7 (49.5)	14.7 (58.5)	18.7 (65.7)	19.0 (66.2)	15.7 (60.3)	9.6 (49.3)	4.0 (39.2)	−0.3 (31.5)	7.8 (46.0)
Record low °C (°F)	−10.6 (12.9)	−11.5 (11.3)	−7.7 (18.1)	−3.8 (25.2)	−0.6 (30.9)	4.3 (39.7)	9.1 (48.4)	11.3 (52.3)	5.4 (41.7)	−0.3 (31.5)	−2.9 (26.8)	−8.7 (16.3)	−11.5 (11.3)
Average precipitation mm (inches)	81.2 (3.20)	104.0 (4.09)	142.9 (5.63)	142.2 (5.60)	177.9 (7.00)	299.1 (11.78)	414.1 (16.30)	331.8 (13.06)	356.0 (14.02)	188.0 (7.40)	103.3 (4.07)	108.9 (4.29)	2,437.3 (95.96)
Average precipitation days (≥ 1.0 mm)	11.8	11.7	12.9	11.0	10.7	14.2	14.8	12.9	12.9	9.9	8.6	12.1	143.5
Mean monthly sunshine hours	94.3	109.1	151.4	188.8	199.6	141.8	166.2	174.7	136.4	149.6	118.9	98.3	1,732.3
Source: Japan Meteorological Agency

== Demographics ==
Per Japanese census data, the population of Miyoshi in 2020 is 23,605 people. Miyoshi has been conducting censuses since 1920.

Historical population
Year	Pop.	±%
1920	61,689	—
1925	64,904	+5.2%
1930	64,922	+0.0%
1935	65,486	+0.9%
1940	63,080	−3.7%
1945	76,457	+21.2%
1950	77,702	+1.6%
1955	77,779	+0.1%
1960	71,370	−8.2%
1965	63,837	−10.6%
1970	55,537	−13.0%
1975	50,121	−9.8%
1980	47,057	−6.1%
1985	45,340	−3.6%
1990	42,219	−6.9%
1995	40,087	−5.0%
2000	37,305	−6.9%
2005	34,103	−8.6%
2010	29,963	−12.1%
2015	26,836	−10.4%
2020	23,605	−12.0%
Miyoshi population statistics

== History ==
As with all of Tokushima Prefecture, the area of Miyoshi was part of ancient Awa Province. From the Muromachi period it was the seat of the Miyoshi clan, a once powerful warlord clan who ruled most of Shikoku and parts of Honshu.. During the Edo period, the area was part of the holdings of Tokushima Domain ruled by the Hachisuka clan from their seat at Tokushima Castle. Following the Meiji restoration, it was organized into 10 villages within Miyoshi District, Tokushima with the creation of the modern municipalities system on October 1, 1889, including the villages of Ikeda (池田村), Mino (三野村), Sanmyo (三名村), and Minawa (三縄村). Ikeda was raised to town status on October 1, 1905 and Mino on January 26, 1924. Sanyo and Minawa merged on September 30, 1956 to form the town of Yamashiro.

The city of Miyoshi was established on March 1, 2006, from the merger between the towns of Ikeda, Ikawa, Mino and Yamashiro, (all from Miyoshi District) and the villages of Higashiiyayama and Nishiiyayama from Mima District.

== Government ==
Miyoshi has a mayor-council form of government with a directly elected mayor and a unicameral city council of 22 members. Miyoshi contributes two members to the Tokushima Prefectural Assembly. In terms of national politics, the city is part of Tokushima 2nd district of the lower house of the Diet of Japan.

== Economy ==
The economy of Miyoshi is strongly dependent on agriculture, forestry and small-scale food processing.

== Education ==
Miyoshi has 13 public elementary schools and six public middle schools operated by the city government and three public high schools operated by the Tokushima Prefectural Department of Education. The prefecture also operates one special education school for the handicapped.

== Transportation ==
=== Railway ===
Shikoku Railway Company – Tokushima Line

- Tsuji – Tsukuda

Shikoku Railway Company – Dosan Line

- Tsubojiri – Hashikura – Tsukuda – Awa-Ikeda – Minawa – Iyaguchi – Awa-Kawaguchi – Koboke – Ōboke

=== Highways ===
- Tokushima Expressway
- National Route 32
- National Route 192
- National Route 319
- National Route 438
- National Route 439

== Sister cities ==
- The Dalles, Oregon, United States

== Local attractions ==
- Iya Valley
- Hashikura Prefectural Natural Park
- Kazura Bridge
- Koboke Gorge
- Oboke Gorge
- Oku Kazura Bridge
- Unpen-ji, 66th temple on the Shikoku Pilgrimage
- Yoshino River
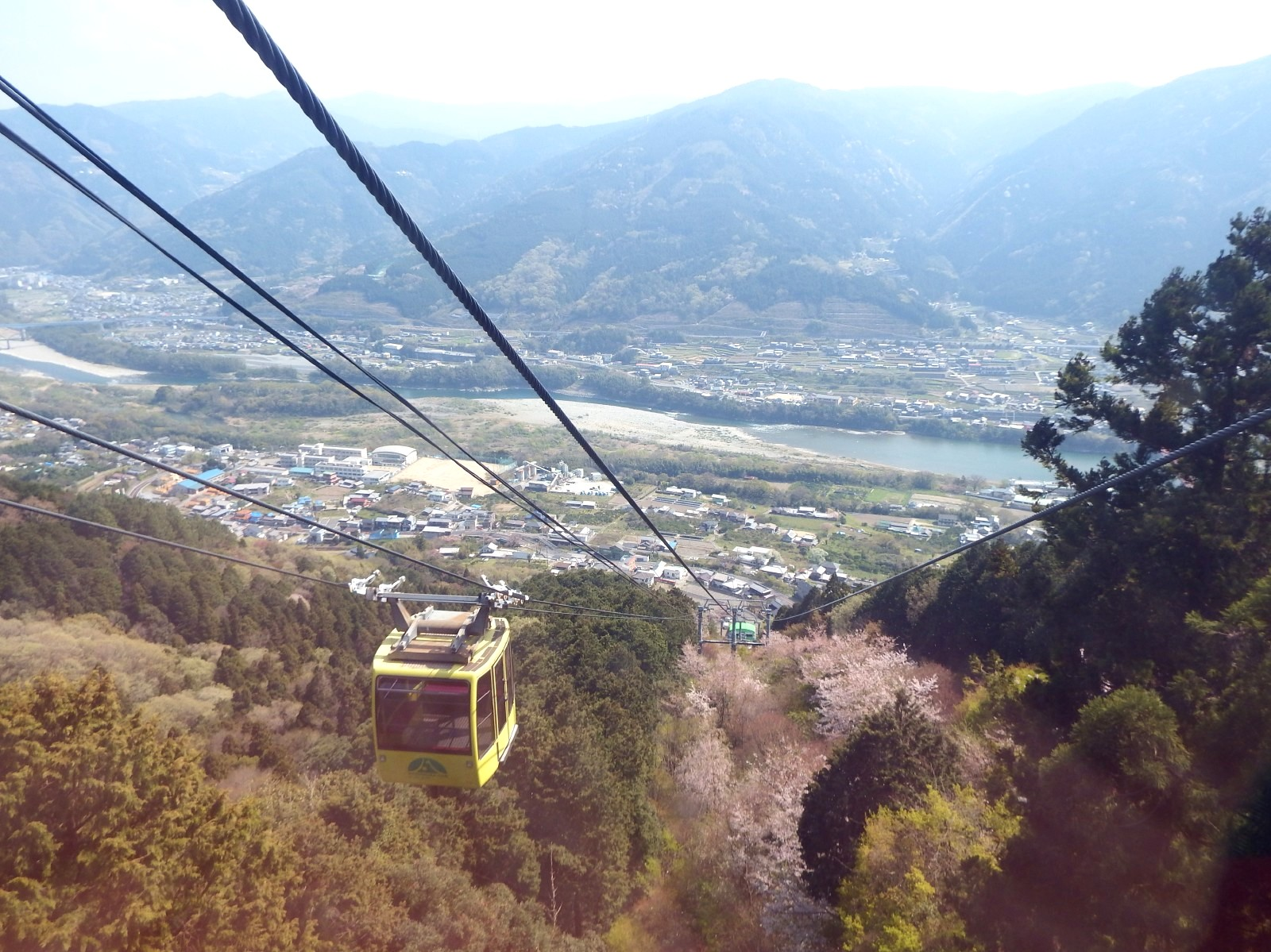
Hasikura Ropeway

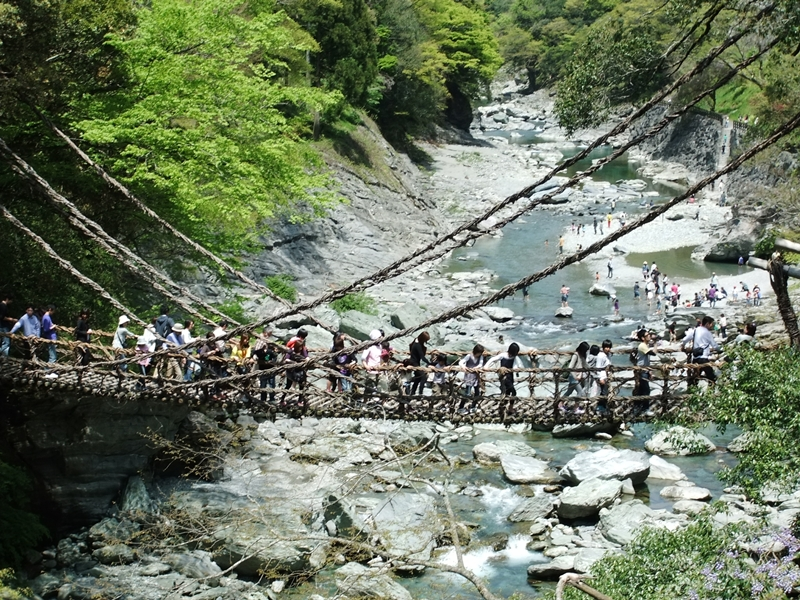
Kazura-bashi, Iya Valley

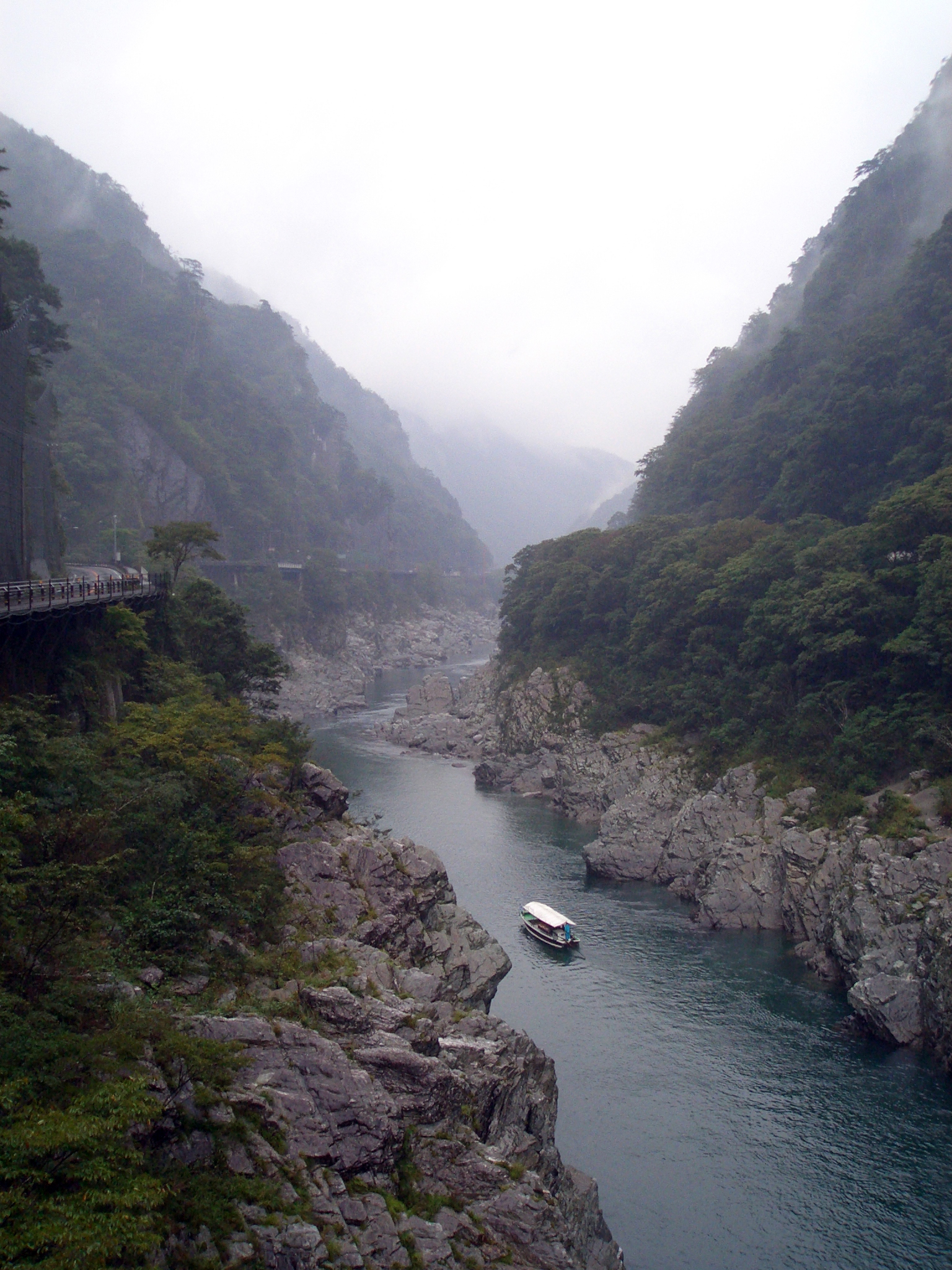
Oboke Koboke

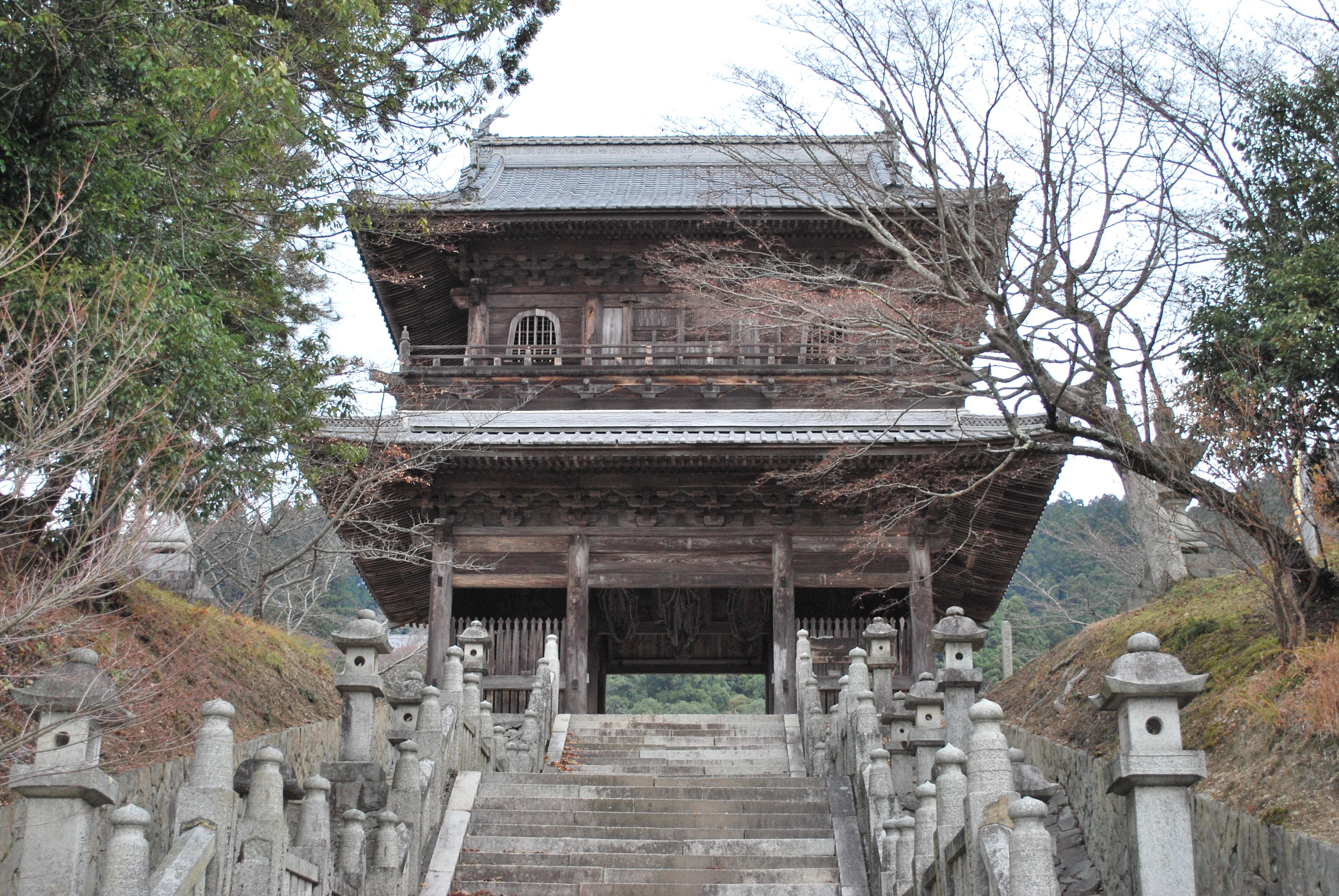
Hashikura-ji

== Noted people from Miyoshi ==
- Miho Takai, politician
- Shunichi Yamaguchi, politician
- Kikuji Yamashita, artist
- Naoji Miyauchi, baseball player
