= Miyoshi District, Tokushima =

District in Tokushima prefecture, Japan

Coordinates: 34.037°N 133.914°E

Location in Tokushima Prefecture See SVG File with names

Miyoshi (三好郡, Miyoshi-gun) is a district located in Tokushima Prefecture, Japan.

As of June 1, 2019, the district has an estimated population of 14,025 and a density of 115 persons per km^{2}. The total area is 122.48 km^{2}.

== Towns and villages ==
- Higashimiyoshi

== Mergers ==
- On March 1, 2006 the towns of Ikawa, Ikeda, Mino and Yamashiro, and the villages of Higashiiyayama and Nishiiyayama merged to form the new city of Miyoshi. (Merger Information Page)
- On March 1, 2006 the towns of Mikamo and Miyoshi merged to form the new town of Higashimiyoshi. (Merger Information Page)
