= List of mergers in Tokushima Prefecture =

Here is a list of mergers in Tokushima Prefecture, Japan since the Heisei era.

== Mergers from April 1, 1999 to Present ==
- On October 1, 2004 - the towns of Kamojima, Kawashima and Yamakawa, and the village of Misato (all from Oe District) were merged to create the city of Yoshinogawa. Oe District was dissolved as a result of this merger. (Merger Information Page)
- On March 1, 2005 - the former town of Mima absorbed the towns of Anabuki and Waki, and the village of Koyadaira (all from Mima District) to create the city of Mima.
- On March 1, 2005 - the towns of Handa and Sadamitsu, and the village of Ichiu (all from Mima District) were merged to create the town of Tsurugi.
- On March 1, 2005 - the towns of Aioi, Kaminaka and Wajiki, and the villages of Kisawa and Kito (all from Naka District) were merged to create the town of Naka.
- On April 1, 2005 - the former town of Awa absorbed the town of Ichiba (both from Awa District), and the towns of Donari and Yoshino (both from Itano District) to create the city of Awa. Awa District was dissolved as a result of this merger.
- On March 1, 2006 - the towns of Ikawa, Ikeda, Mino and Yamashiro, and the villages of Higashiiyayama and Nishiiyayama (all from Miyoshi District) were merged to create the city of Miyoshi. (Merger Information Page)
- On March 1, 2006 - the towns of Miyoshi and Mikamo (both from Miyoshi District) were merged to create the town of Higashimiyoshi.
- On March 20, 2006 - the towns of Hanoura and Nakagawa (from Naka District) were merged into the expanded city of Anan. (Merger Information Page)
- On March 31, 2006 - the towns of Kaifu, Kainan and Shishikui (all from Kaifu District) were merged to create the town of Kaiyō.
- On March 31, 2006 - the towns of Hiwasa and Yuki (both from Kaifu District) were merged to create the town of Minami.
