= Typhoon Fran =

Pacific typhoon in 1976

Typhoon Fran (Reming)
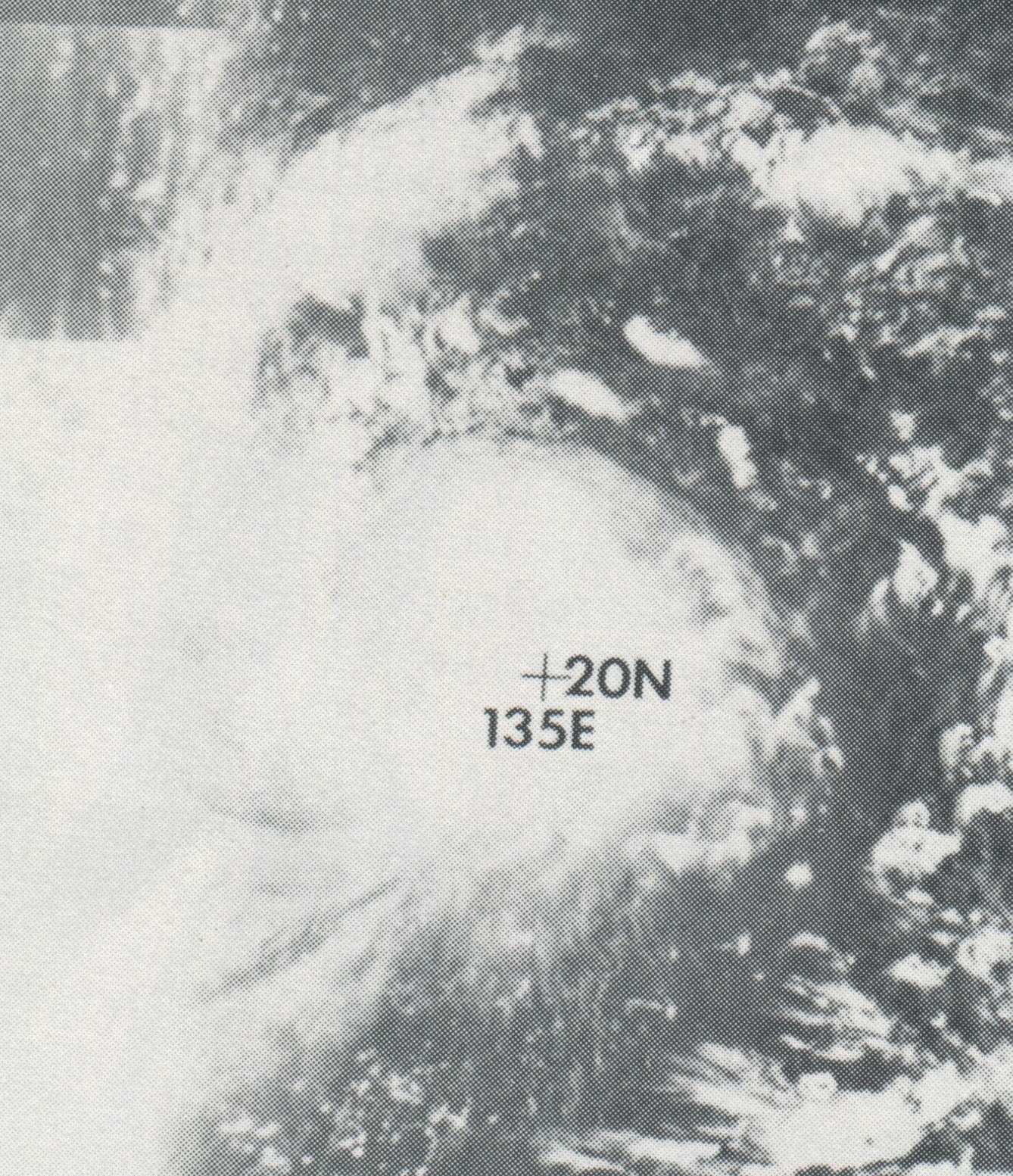
- Typhoon Fran undergoing rapid intensification on September 7

Meteorological history
- Formed: September 3, 1976
- Extratropical: September 14, 1976
- Dissipated: September 16, 1976

Typhoon
- 10-minute sustained (JMA)
- Lowest pressure: 910 hPa (mbar); 26.87 inHg

Category 4-equivalent super typhoon
- 1-minute sustained (SSHWS/JTWC)
- Highest winds: 240 km/h (150 mph)
- Lowest pressure: 913 hPa (mbar); 26.96 inHg

Overall effects
- Fatalities: 169 total
- Damage: $660 million (1976 USD)
- Areas affected: Mariana Islands, Japan
- IBTrACS
- Part of the 1976 Pacific typhoon season

Typhoon Fran, known in the Philippines as Super Typhoon Reming, produced tremendous rainfall in Japan including, at the time, a national 24-hour record accumulation of 1,140 mm (44.8 in). Forming as a tropical depression on September 3 to the southeast of Guam, Fran steadily intensified as it moved along a general northwest track. After brushing Guam two days later, the system achieved typhoon status on September 6 after the formation of an eye. A period of explosive intensification ensued thereafter and Fran reached its peak as a Category 4-equivalent typhoon with winds of 240 km/h (150 mph) the following day. Gradual weakening began on September 8 as it neared the Ryukyu Islands, and the system subsequently meandered near the islands for two days before striking Kyushu on September 12. It then moved over the Sea of Japan where it transitioned into an extratropical cyclone and ultimately dissipated on September 16.

Regarded as the worst typhoon in ten years, nearly a week of continuous rains caused disastrous flooding and landslides across Japan. Accumulations peaked at 2,781 mm (109.5 in) in Hiso, Tokushima. More than 325,000 people were forced to evacuate their homes and transportation was crippled. Nearly half a million homes were damaged or destroyed, leaving 300,000 people homeless. Many residents required rooftop rescue by helicopter. All told, the typhoon killed 169 people and left at least US$660 million in damage throughout its path.

== Meteorological history ==
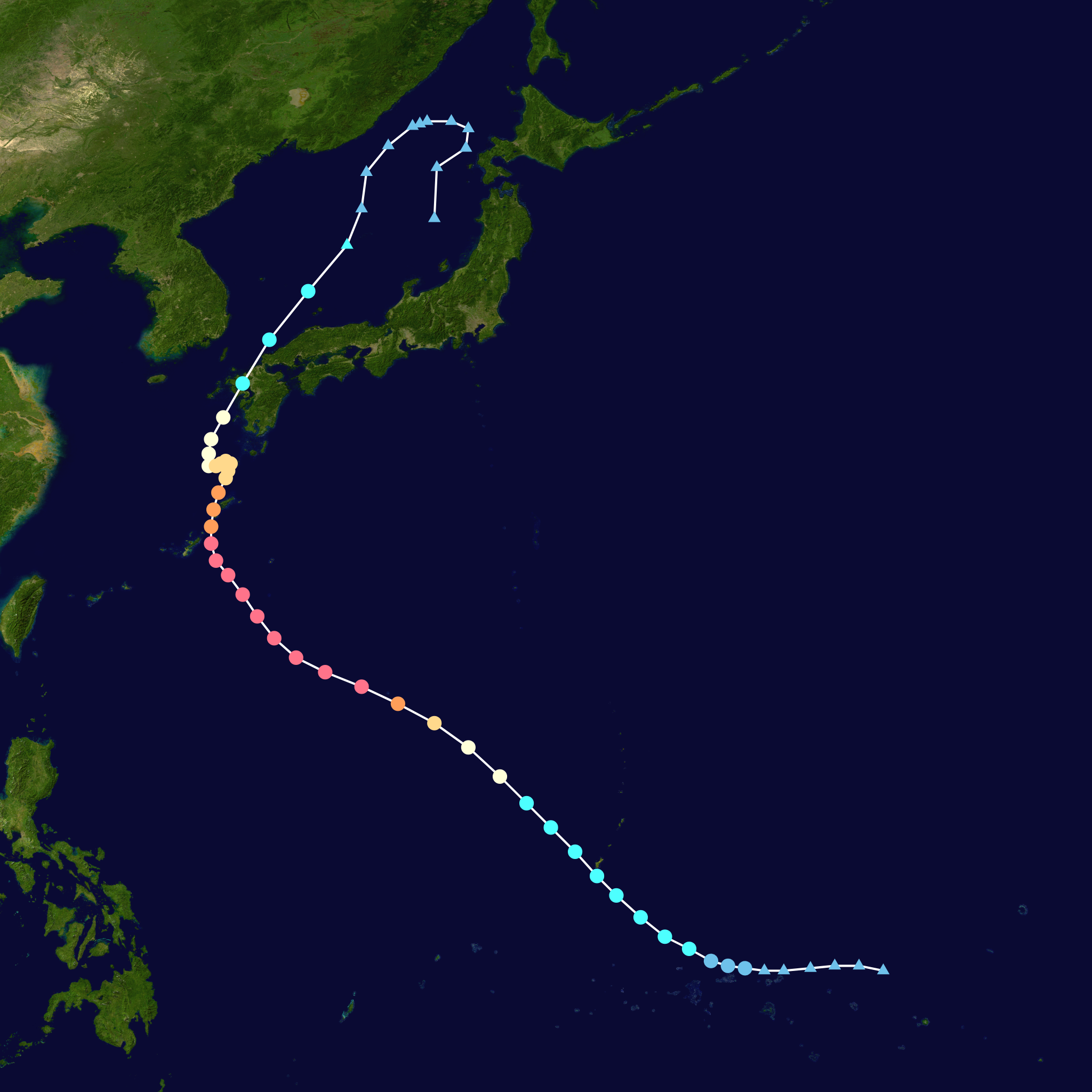
Map plotting the storm's track and intensity, according to the Saffir–Simpson scale Map key Saffir–Simpson scale Tropical depression (≤38 mph, ≤62 km/h) Tropical storm (39–73 mph, 63–118 km/h) Category 1 (74–95 mph, 119–153 km/h) Category 2 (96–110 mph, 154–177 km/h) Category 3 (111–129 mph, 178–208 km/h) Category 4 (130–156 mph, 209–251 km/h) Category 5 (≥157 mph, ≥252 km/h) Unknown Storm type Tropical cyclone Subtropical cyclone Extratropical cyclone, remnant low, tropical disturbance, or monsoon depression

In early September 1976, an area of convection was identified within a monsoon trough to the northeast of Pohnpei. Traveling west, the system gradually developed and was classified as a tropical depression—the seventeenth of the season—at 12:00 UTC on September 3 by the Joint Typhoon Warning Center (JTWC). (Note: The Joint Typhoon Warning Center is a joint United States Navy – United States Air Force task force that issues tropical cyclone warnings for the western Pacific Ocean and other regions.) At this time, the depression was located roughly 795 km (494 mi) southeast of Guam. Situated near a weakness in a subtropical ridge (located south of Japan), the incipient depression turned northwest and gained strength. Aircraft reconnaissance found the system to have achieved tropical storm status by 03:39 UTC the next day, measuring a central pressure of 997 hPa (mbar; 29.44 inHg). At this time, the system was assigned the name Fran. On September 5, Fran brushed the Mariana Islands to the southwest, passing 35 km (22 mi) west of Guam. Intensification began in earnest on September 6 as a 55 km (34 mi) wide eye developed, signaling Fran's rise to typhoon status. Upper-level conditions, including two anticyclones to the north and east, temporarily hindered additional strengthening by suppressing the typhoon's outflow.

During the latter part of September 6, the aforementioned hindering features quickly subsided, allowing for ample ventilation of the storm and enabled a period of explosive intensification. Aided by a shortwave trough over central China, Fran's outflow dramatically improved. In a roughly 24-hour span from September 6–7, Fran's central pressure plummeted from 977 hPa (mbar; 28.85 inHg) to 916 hPa (27.05 inHg). This included a drop of 43 hPa (mbar; 1.27 inHg) in 12 hours. Fran achieved its peak maximum sustained winds of 240 km/h (150 mph) at 12:00 UTC, (Note: In situ estimates thought Fran to have been slightly stronger, with maximum winds of 250 km/h (160 mph).) classifying it as a Category 4-equivalent on the Saffir–Simpson hurricane scale. The storm also entered the Philippine Area of Responsibility around this time, prompting PAGASA to assign it with the local name Reming. A subsequent reanalysis, though not yet integrated into JTWC's official track, determined Fran to have been slightly weaker with winds of 230 km/h (140 mph). Though conditions remained highly favorable, Fran entered a near-steady state at this point with its pressure decreasingly slightly to its lowest observed value of 913 hPa (mbar; 26.96 inHg) at 21:09 UTC. At this time, Fran was an unusually large cyclone with gale-force winds extending 485 mi (300 mi) from its center and an immense 13.4° radius of outermost closed isobar. The previously beneficial shortwave trough bypassed the typhoon on September 8 and allowed for increased wind shear from an anticyclone to the west to impact Fran. This resulted in slow weakening of the storm. Rounding the edge of a separate trough, Fran also began a northward turn that directed it at the Ryukyu Islands of Japan.

Between 12:00 and 18:00 UTC on September 9, the eye of Fran passed between Okinoerabujima and Tokunoshima. Continual back and forth shifting of a trough north of the typhoon caused Fran to slow to a crawl by September 10. For the next day, Fran moved erratically along the western edge of the Tokara Islands, southwest of Kyushu, all the while battering the region with torrential rain and damaging winds. A deepening trough over China pushed the weakening typhoon northeast on September 11, with Fran eventually making landfall over Nagasaki Prefecture between 12:00 and 18:00 UTC on September 12. Winds up to 156 km/h (97 mph) were reported in Nagasaki City. After losing typhoon strength, Fran emerged over the Sea of Japan where cooler waters spurred its transition into an extratropical cyclone by 06:00 UTC on September 13. The remnant system continued northward, brushing Primorsky Krai, Russia, before turning back to the south. On September 14, multiple vessels encountered gale-force winds, with a ship by the call sign URPS reporting 111 km/h (69 mph) winds, and seas up to 9.4 m (31 ft). Winds gradually subsided as the storm weakened, and only two ships encountered gales on September 15. It ultimately dissipated over the Sea of Japan on September 16.

== Impact ==
Locations observing more than 1,000 mm (39 in) of rain during Typhoon Fran across Japan. The gold marker denotes the location of Hiso, Tokushima.

On September 5, Tropical Storm Fran brushed the Mariana Islands, passing 35 km (22 mi) to the west of Guam. Damage, if any, is unknown, though sustained winds of 56 km/h (35 mph) and gusts of 76 km/h (47 mph) were observed on Guam.

Prior to the arrival of Fran in the Ryukyu Islands, the United States Air Force relocated 30 aircraft from their base in Okinawa to bases in South Korea. Officials stressed the nature of the evacuation as the movement of aircraft coincided with the end of a heightened alert period along the Korean DMZ following the death of two U.S. Army officers.

The typhoon's slow movement led to tremendous rainfall accumulations across parts of southeastern Japan, with some areas seeing continuous rain for six days. Multiple stations recorded over 1,000 mm (39 in) of rain, primarily across Shikoku, with a peak of 2,781 mm (109.5 in) in Hiso, Tokushima. Of this, 1,140 mm (44.8 in) fell in a 24-hour span between September 11–12, the highest such total on record in Japan. However, sources differ on this total with some indicating the peak 24-hour total being 1,174 mm (46.2 in) in Fukuharaasahi, or 1,114 mm (43.9 in), which was observed in Kito. Regardless of which total was valid, it remained the national record until August 2004 when Typhoon Namtheun produced a 24-hour total of 1,317 mm (51.9 in) in Kisawa. Significant totals across other prefectures include 1,392 mm (54.8 in) in Motoyama, Kōchi, 1,328 mm (52.3 in) in Uchinomi, Kagawa, 1,188 mm (46.8 in) on Mount Dainichi, and 1,184 mm (46.6 in) on Mount Ōdaigahara.

Thousands of landslides caused considerable damage and killed at least 70 people. More than 325,000 people evacuated across the nation. An embankment along the Nagara River near Anpachi, Gifu, collapsed on September 12 and forced thousands of residents from their homes. Many required evacuation by boat or helicopter. A total of 11,193 homes were destroyed a further 442,317 sustained damage. Floods also affected 80,304 hectares (198,440 acres) of crops. Tremendous damage to infrastructure paralyzed transportation in many areas, and travel across the entire nation was disrupted for at least three days. Hundreds of bridges were damaged or washed away.

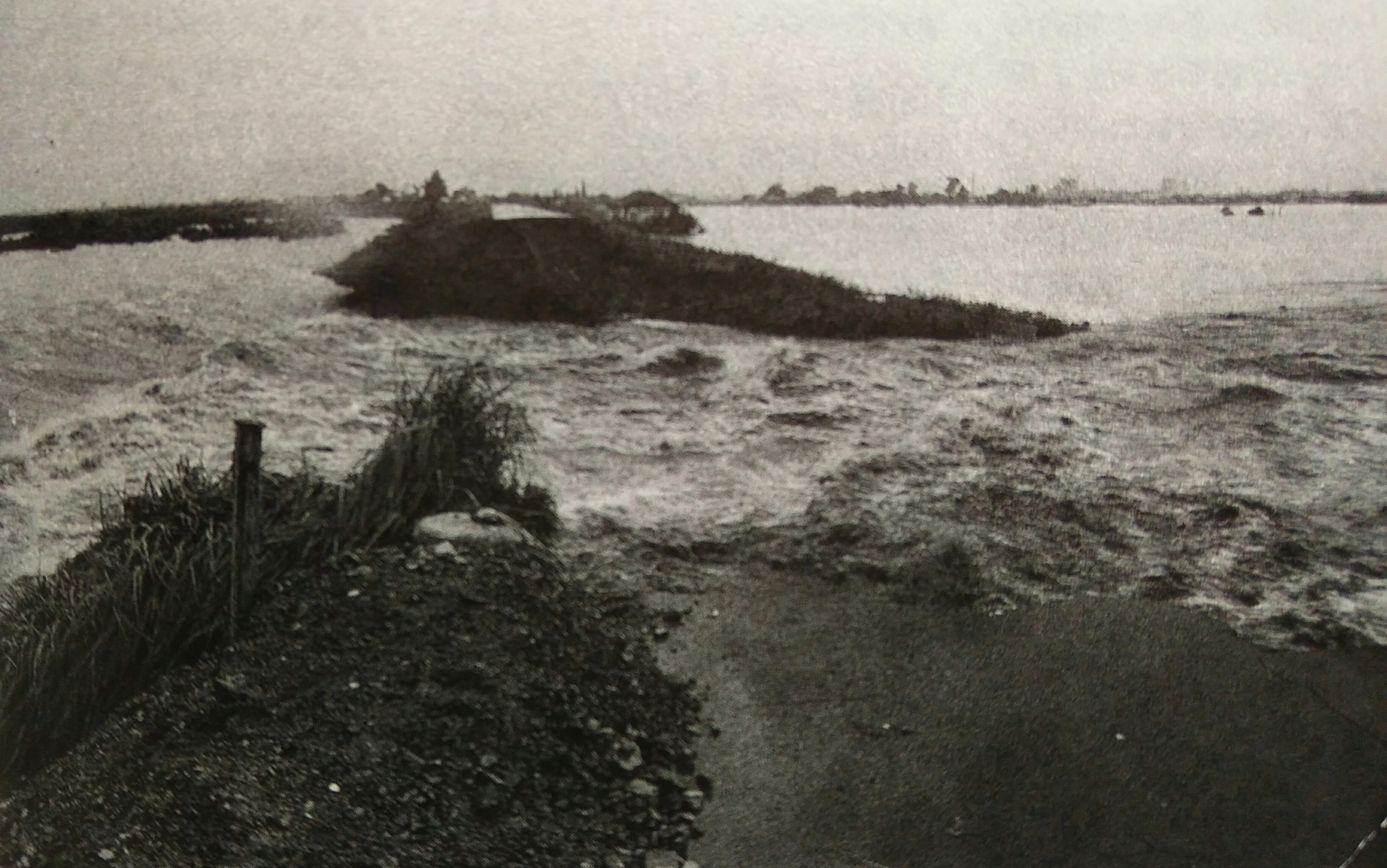
A massive levee collapsed on the Nagara River

Passing 110 km (68 mi) east of Okinawa, Fran produced sustained winds of 102 km/h (63 mph) with gusts to 135 km/h (84 mph) at Kadena Air Base. Throughout Japan, 169 people died and 435 others were injured. Property damage exceeded US$660 million, and more than 300,000 people were rendered homeless. Fran was regarded as the worst storm to strike Japan in 10 years when Typhoon Ida claimed more than 300 lives.

Offshore, the storms destructive winds and waves split the 52,157 ton oil tanker Ryoyo Maru in two over the Bungo Channel, anchored near Beppu; all 62 crewmen were rescued safely. Another ship, the 2,556 ton Panamanian freighter JCIS, ran aground in Minamata Bay. In Pohang, South Korea, the 23,089 ton British bulk carrier Eastern Freedom broke all its stern-side moorings, resulting in its propeller and rudder being damaged; a nearby Korean naval ship was also damaged. While over the Sea of Japan, Fran's extratropical remnants caused havoc among the Soviet fishing fleet. In all, 138 vessels sank or were damaged by the storm.

About 5,300 members of the Japan Self-Defense Forces were mobilized for relief efforts across the nation by September 13. A rescue helicopter crashed over Mikawa Bay during a mission, resulting in three injuries. Many people were forced to wait on their roof overnight for rescue as floodwaters swept through towns.

== See also ==
- 1976 Pacific typhoon season
- List of wettest tropical cyclones
- List of wettest tropical cyclones by country § Japan
