= Tsurugizan Taniemon II =

Japanese sumo wrestler

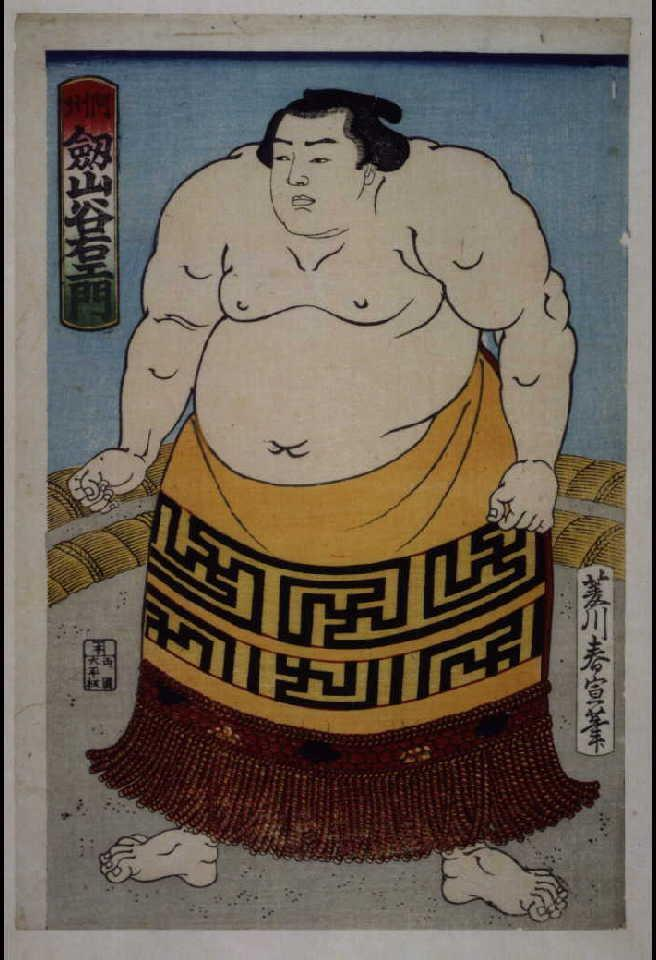

Personal information
- Native name: 劔山 谷右エ門
- Born: Kumakichi Harai; January 20, 1852 Kamojima, Oe District, Japan
- Died: November 21, 1910 (aged 58)
- Height: 1.77 m (5 ft 9 1/2 in)
- Weight: 120 kg (260 lb)

Sport
- Sport: Sumo
- Retired: January, 1886
- Heya: Inagawa → Ikazuchi
- Record: 70-26-79-14 draws/1 hold
- Debut: May, 1885
- Highest rank: Ōzeki (January, 1893)
- Elder name: Musashigawa
- Championships: 1 (Makuuchi, unofficial)
- Updated on September, 2023

Tsurugizan Taniemon (劔山 谷右エ門; January 20, 1852 – November 21, 1910) was a Japanese professional sumo wrestler from Kamojima, Oe District (now Awa, Tokushima Prefecture). His highest rank was ōzeki and he is one of only two wrestlers from this prefecture to have reached this rank, being the second overall and the first promoted since Eshimagata's promotion in 1778, 108 years earlier.

== History ==
Tsurugizan began his wrestling career by joining the Osaka-based sumo association thanks to a wrestler named Tsurugahama, a relation of his father. There, he joined Inagawa stable and started to wrestle in 1875 under the shikona, or ring name, Kyōya (響矢). The following year, in 1876, there was however a breakout incident within the Osaka Sumo Association and Tsurugizan decided to join the secessionists. In 1878, he began to serve the group as a promotional ōzeki but decided to join back the Osaka association. In 1882, he decided to join the Tokyo-based sumo association.

In 1883, he became a student of Umegatani, who was still an active wrestler at the time, in Ikazuchi stable and competed in the May tournament of the same year directly as a san'yaku-ranked wrestler. He was given the shikona Tsurugizan (劔山) after a mountain in his home prefecture. In January 1884, he changed his name to Taniemon to bear the complete name of the eponymous ōzeki who wrestled during the Edo period. In May 1885, he was promoted to sekiwake and in January 1886, he was promoted to ōzeki in place of his master who retired. In 1891, he scooted a young boy and asked his master to recruit him within the stable, hence recruiting future-yokozuna Umegatani Tōtarō II.

He retired in June 1892 and became an elder in the Sumo Association under the name Musashigawa, notably serving as a shimpan. He died in November 1910 at the age of 58.

== Career record ==
Tsurugizan Taniemon II
-	Spring	Summer
1883	Unknown	East Komusubi #2; 4–1–4; 1d
1884	East Komusubi #1; 6–1–2; 1d	East Komusubi #1; 5–3–2
1885	East Komusubi #1; 7–1–1; 1d	East Sekiwake #1; 7–2–1
1886	East Ōzeki #1; 7–1–1; 1d	East Ōzeki #1; 7–1–1; 1h Unofficial
1887	East Ōzeki #1; 0–0–10	East Ōzeki #1; 4–1–3; 2d
1888	East Ōzeki #1; 2–1–5; 2d	East Ōzeki #1; 7–0–1; 2d
1889	East Ōzeki #1; 5–1–3; 1d	East Ōzeki #1; 0–0–10
1890	East Ōzeki #1; 0–2–7; 1d	West Haridashi Ōzeki; 0–0–10
1891	West Haridashi Ōzeki; 2–5–3	West Haridashi Ōzeki; 6–1–1; 2d
1892	West Haridashi Ōzeki; 1–5–4	West Haridashi Ōzeki; Retired; 0–0–10
Record given as win-loss-absent Top Division Champion Retired Lower Divisions Key: d=Draw(s) (引分); h=Hold(s) (預り); nr=no result recorded Divisions: Makuuchi — Jūryō — Makushita — Sandanme — Jonidan — Jonokuchi Makuuchi ranks: Yokozuna (not ranked as such on banzuke until 1890); Ōzeki — Sekiwake — Komusubi — Maegashira

*Championships for the best record in a tournament were not recognized or awarded before the 1909 summer tournament and the above championships that are labelled "unofficial" are historically conferred. For more information see yūshō.

== See also ==
- Glossary of sumo terms
- List of past sumo wrestlers
- List of ōzeki

== Sources ==
=== Further reading ===
- "「大相撲人物大事典」" [Sumo Personalities Encyclopedia]. Sumo Magazine. Baseball Magazine, Inc. January 2001. p. 725. ISBN 9784583036403.
