= Nakago =

Nakago or Nakagō may refer to:

- Nakagō, Niigata, a former village in Nakakubiki District, Niigata Prefecture, Japan
- Nakago (Fushigi Yūgi), a character in the manga series Fushigi Yūgi
- Taiki Nakago (中郷 大樹, born 1984), Japanese baseball player
- nakago, a tang of a Japanese sword
