= Umegatani Tōtarō =

Umegatani Tōtarō may refer to:

- Umegatani Tōtarō I, a sumo wrestler, the 15th Yokozuna
- Umegatani Tōtarō II, a sumo wrestler, the 20th Yokozuna
