= Ōnaruto Nadaemon II =

Japanese sumo wrestler

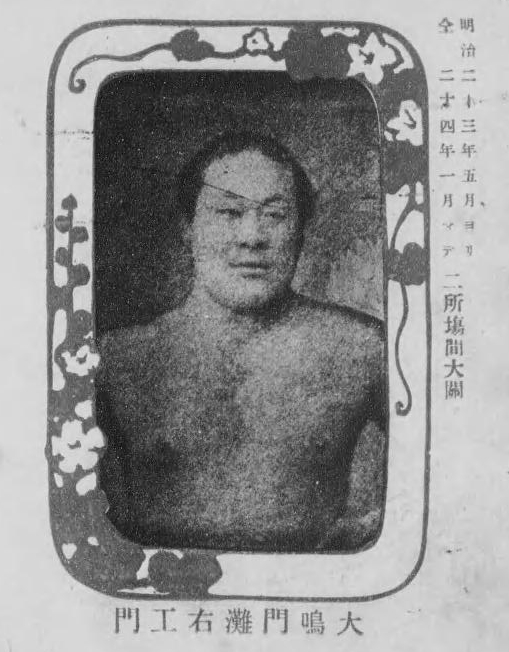

Personal information
- Native name: 大鳴門 灘右エ門
- Born: Yoshizō Ōzora; May 14, 1853 Tsuna District, Hyōgo, Japan
- Died: January 15, 1908 (aged 54)
- Height: 1.73 m (5 ft 8 in)
- Weight: 108 kg (238 lb)

Sport
- Sport: Sumo
- Retired: January, 1891
- Heya: Onogawa → Ikazuchi
- Record: 106-39-64-25 draws/5 hold
- Debut: January, 1879
- Highest rank: Ōzeki (May, 1890)
- Elder name: Hakkaku
- Updated on September, 2023

Ōnaruto Nadaemon (大鳴門 灘右エ門; May 14, 1853 – January 15, 1908) was a Japanese professional sumo wrestler from Tsuna, Hyōgo Prefecture (now Awaji, Hyōgo). His highest rank was ōzeki. He is the second wrestler from Hyōgo Prefecture to have reached this rank, being the first promoted since Iwamigata's promotion in 1821, 69 years earlier.

== History ==
Little is known about Ōzora before he became a professional wrestler. He first tried his luck by becoming a wrestler with the Osaka-based Sumo Association and joined Onogawa stable under the instructions of Hachijin, the first yokozuna from Osaka-sumo promoted by the Gojō family of Kyoto. There, he first took the shikona, or ring name, Shitenryū (司天龍).

Eventually he decided to leave Osaka to become a wrestler with the Tokyo-based Sumo Association in January 1879, and joined Ikazuchi stable led by Umegatani, who was still an active wrestler at the rank of ōzeki. He was quickly promoted to the makuuchi division, just one year after joining the stable. After his first promotion to the rank of sekiwake, he changed his shikona to Ōnaruto (大鳴門), to evoke the whirlpools of his native island, which also gave the name "Ōnaruto" to the bridge that now crosses the Naruto Strait. Ōnaruto later changed his wrestler's first name to "Nadaemon" to evoke the eponymous wrestler of the Edo era. Ōnaruto enjoyed a stable career but failed to break through to the top of the san'yaku ranks. During his years at Ikazuchi, he became known as one of the most skilled wrestlers trained by Umegatani, with Tomonohira and Tsurugizan.

In 1885, he separated from his master by acquiring the name Hakkaku, deciding to open his own stable while continuing to wrestle under the name of Ōnaruto, under the two licenses system.

In 1890, Konishiki was promoted to ōzeki and Ōnaruto was promoted to the same rank as him, directly from the rank of komusubi. This promotion came at a time when the ranking was becoming unbalanced, since Nishinoumi had received a yokozuna licence that same year from the Yoshida family. Nishinoumi also demanded that he be ranked above the ōzeki on the ranking, and thereby imposed the term "yokozuna" on the banzuke. It was then decided that Ōnaruto, as a reward for his many years of service in the san'yaku ranks, should be promoted in order to have a second ōzeki on the banzuke. Nevertheless, Ōnaruto, at the age of 37, failed to live up to the rank, recording only one tournament at this rank and deciding not to participate in a second before retiring as a wrestler. After the latter, he dedicated himself to organising his stable. As a coach, he raised sekiwake Ōnaruto III, who took his shikona and succeeded him as stablemaster in Hakkaku stable. He died at the age of 54 on 15 January 1908.

== Career record ==
Ōnaruto Nadaemon II
-	Spring	Summer
1879	Unknown	West Jūryō #8; 7–3
1880	West Jūryō #2; 8–1	West Maegashira #6; 7–0–2; 1d
1881	West Maegashira #1; 6–1–2; 1d	West Komusubi #1; 4–1–2; 3d
1882	West Sekiwake #1; 6–2–1; 1d	East Sekiwake #1; 2–3–4; 1d
1883	East Komusubi #1; 5–2–2; 1d	East Sekiwake #1; 4–3–3
1884	East Sekiwake #1; 6–1–2; 1d	East Sekiwake #1; 5–1–1; 2d-1h
1885	East Sekiwake #1; 6–2–1; 1d	East Komusubi #1; 5–2–1; 2d
1886	East Sekiwake #1; 2–1–4; 1d-2h	East Sekiwake #1; 4–3–1; 2d
1887	East Sekiwake #1; 6–2–1; 1d	East Sekiwake #1; 2–2–5; 1h
1888	East Sekiwake #1; 5–2–2; 1d	East Sekiwake #1; 3–0–6; 1d
1889	East Sekiwake #1; 4–2–4	East Sekiwake #1; 0–2–5; 2d-1h
1890	East Komusubi #1; 4–2–2; 2d	West Ōzeki #1; 5–1–3; 1d
1891	West Ōzeki #1; Retired; 0–0–10	
Record given as win-loss-absent Top Division Champion Retired Lower Divisions Key: d=Draw(s) (引分); h=Hold(s) (預り); nr=no result recorded Divisions: Makuuchi — Jūryō — Makushita — Sandanme — Jonidan — Jonokuchi Makuuchi ranks: Yokozuna (not ranked as such on banzuke until 1890); Ōzeki — Sekiwake — Komusubi — Maegashira

== See also ==
- Glossary of sumo terms
- List of past sumo wrestlers
- List of ōzeki

== Sources ==
=== Further reading ===
- "「大相撲人物大事典」" [Sumo Personalities Encyclopedia]. Sumo Magazine. Baseball Magazine, Inc. January 2001. p. 725. ISBN 9784583036403.
