= Naka, Tokushima =

Naka 那賀町
- Town
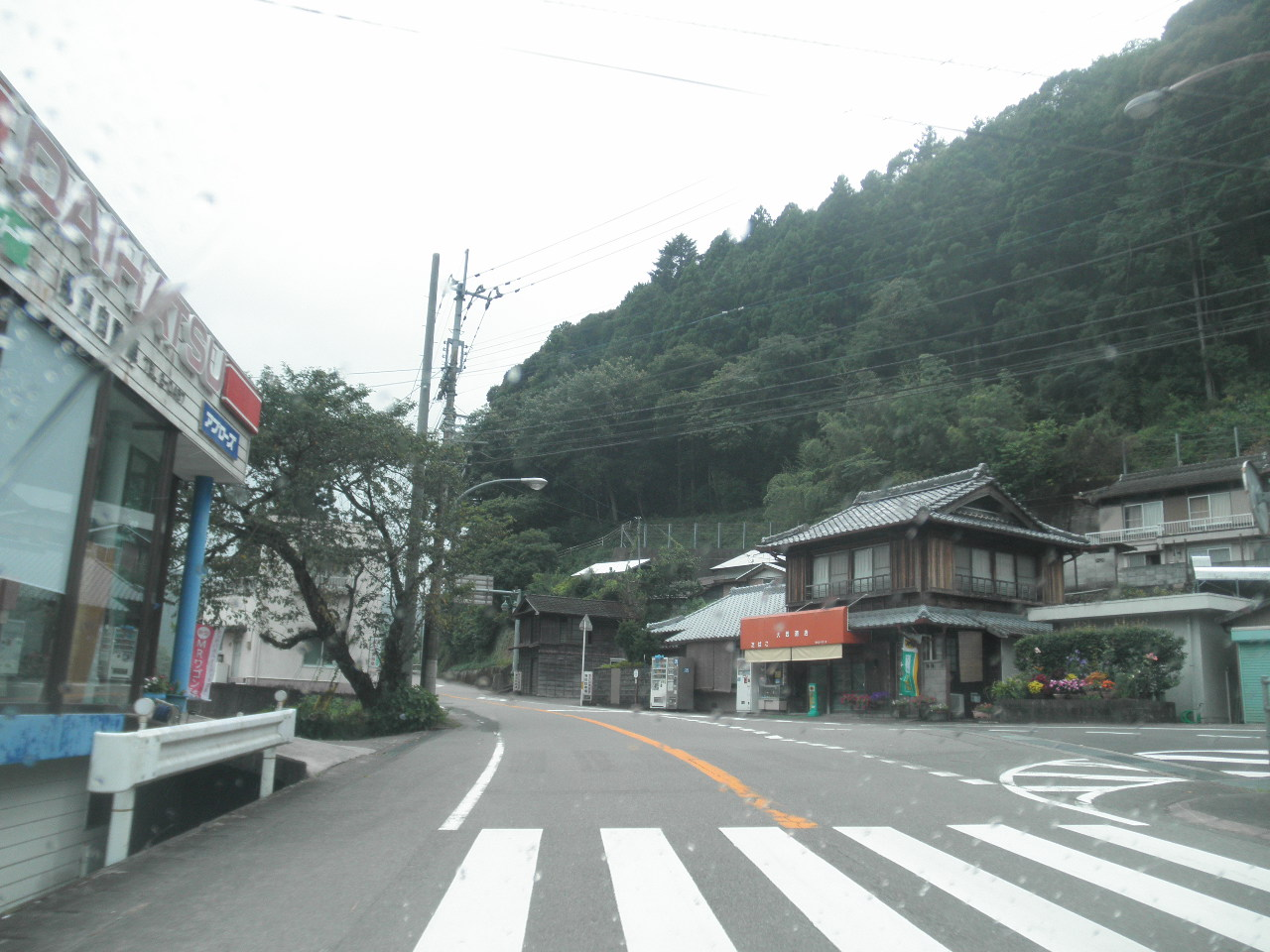
- Naka town

- Flag Seal
- Location of Naka in Tokushima Prefecture

- Location in Japan
- Coordinates: 33°51′N 134°30′E
- Country: Japan
- Region: Shikoku
- Prefecture: Tokushima
- District: Naka

Government
  - Mayor: Hirofumi Sakaguchi

Area
  - Total: 694.98 km^{2} (268.33 sq mi)

Population (March 31, 2022)
  - Total: 7,597
  - Density: 10.93/km^{2} (28.31/sq mi)
- Time zone: UTC+09:00 (JST)
- City hall address: 104-1, Minamigawa, Wajikigo, Naka-cho, Naka-gun, Tokushima-ken 771-5295
- Climate: Cfa
- Website: Official website

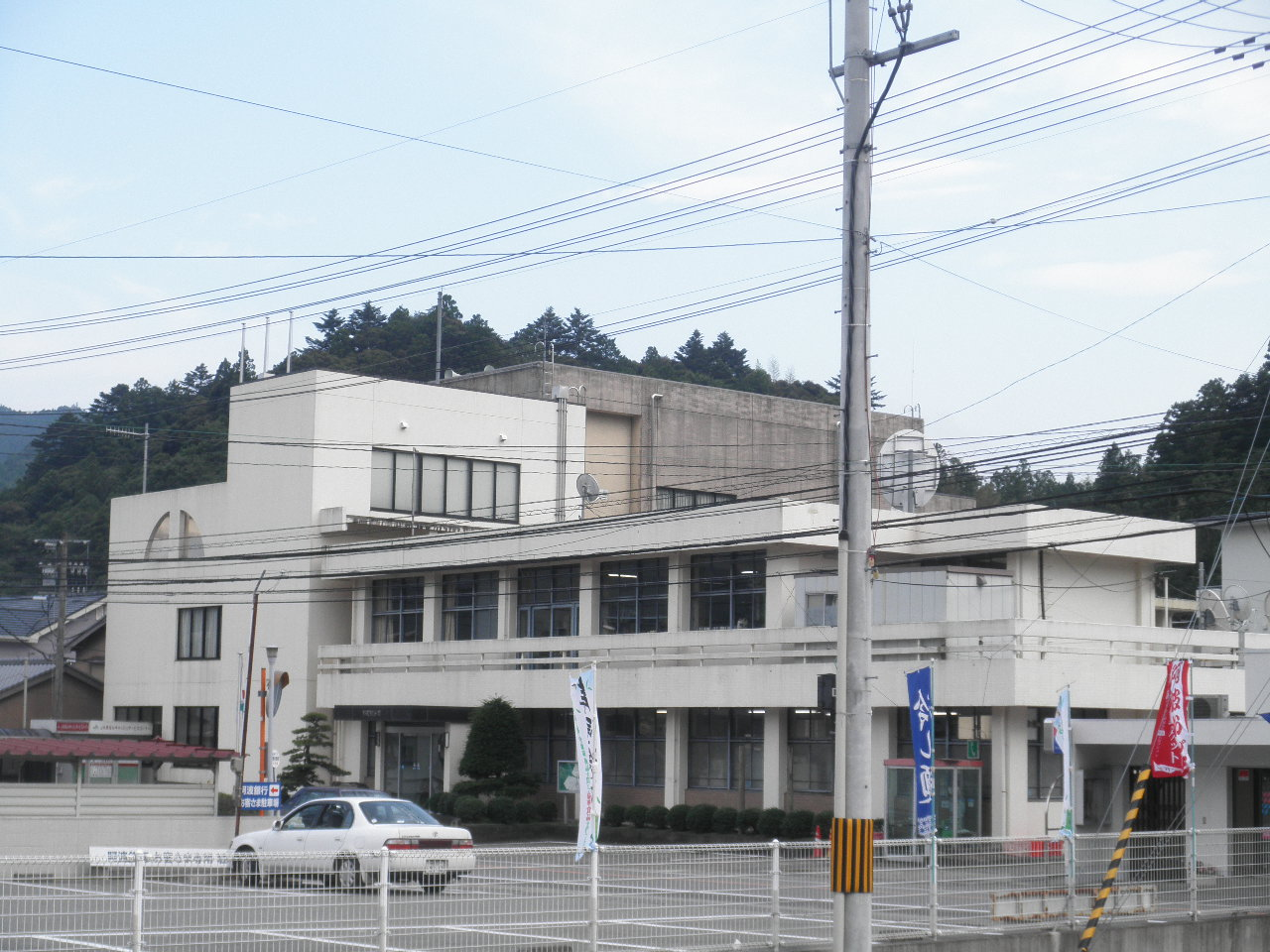
Naka Town Hall

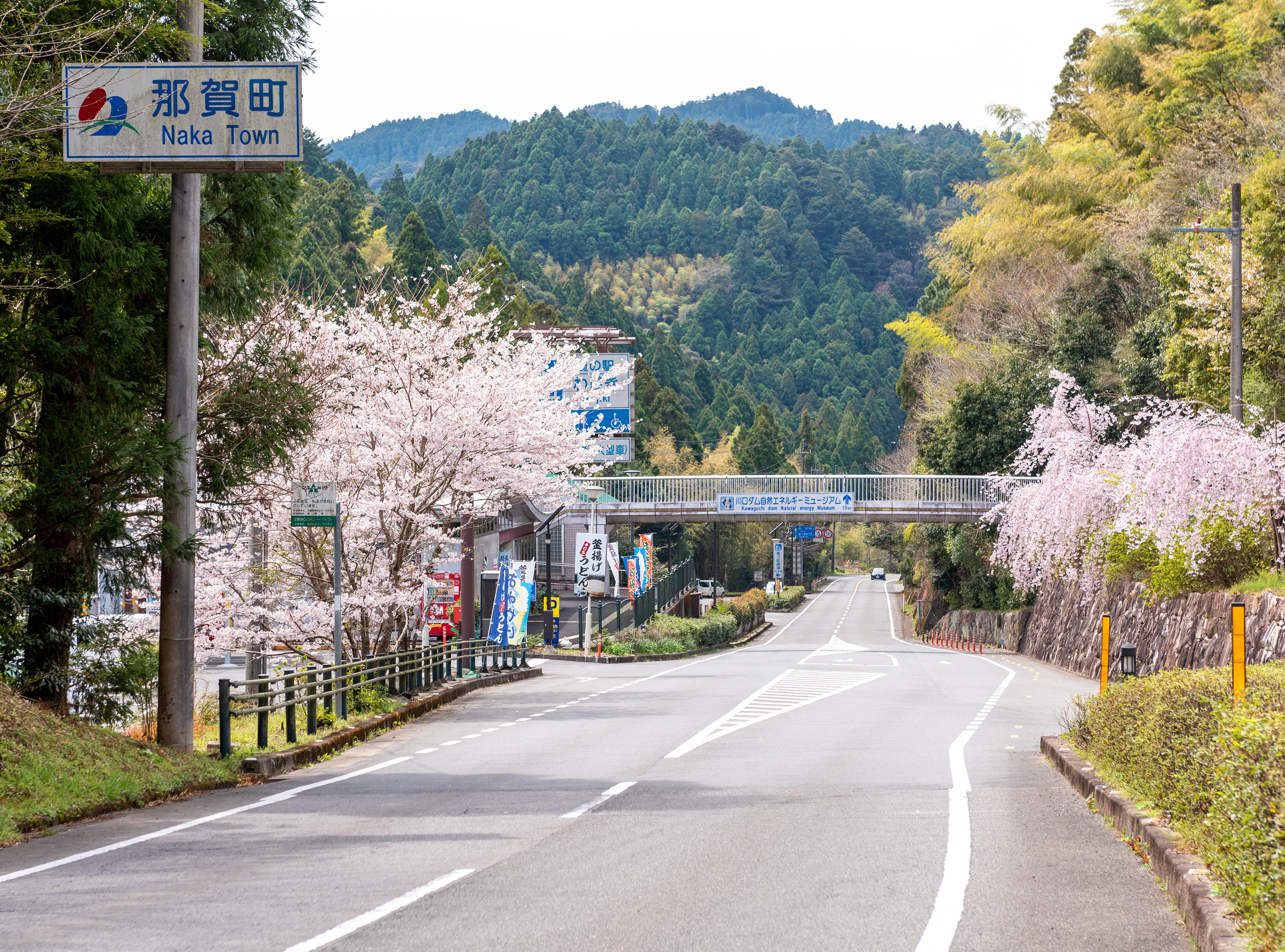
Border of Anan and Naka

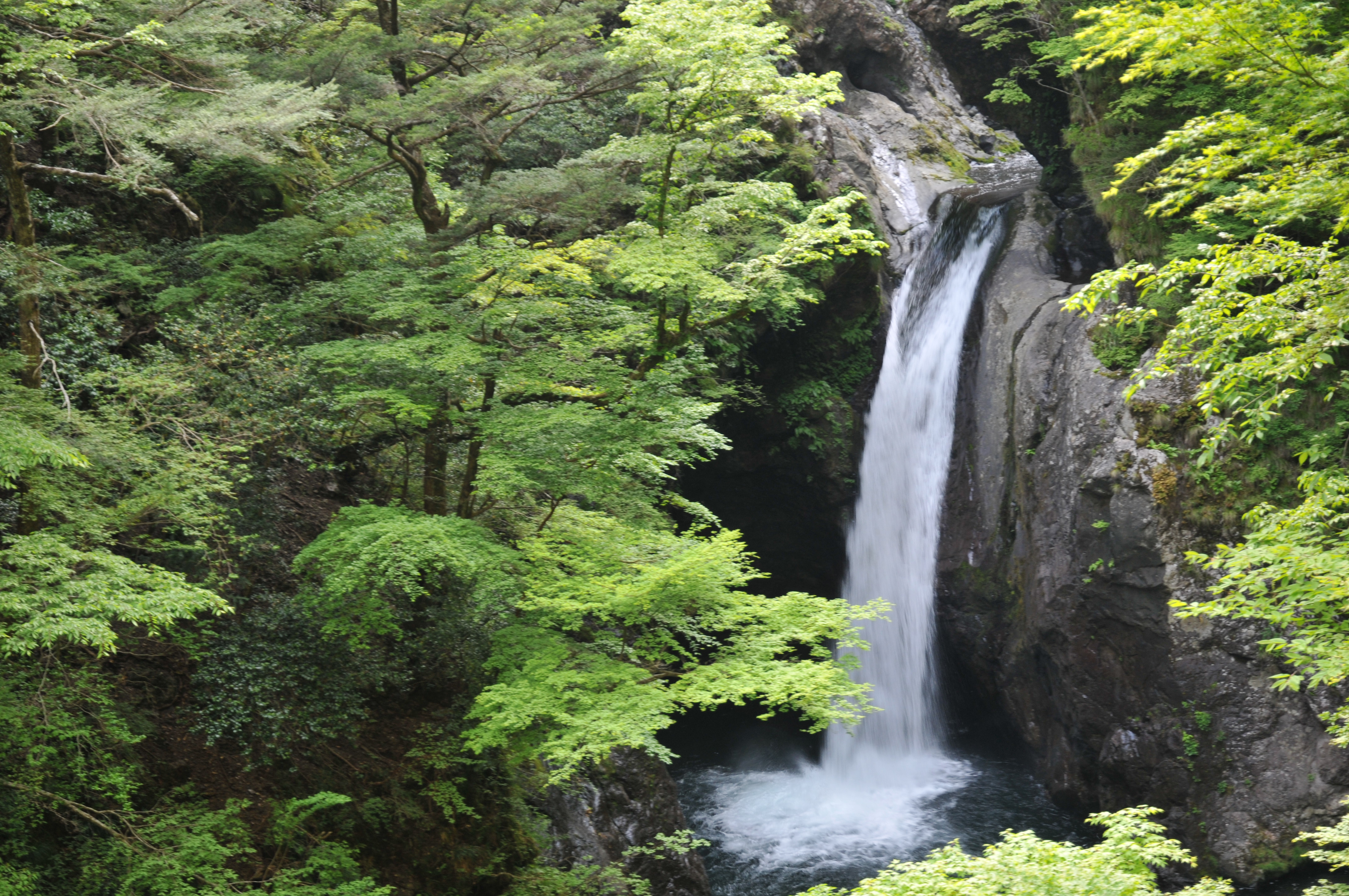
Ogama Falls

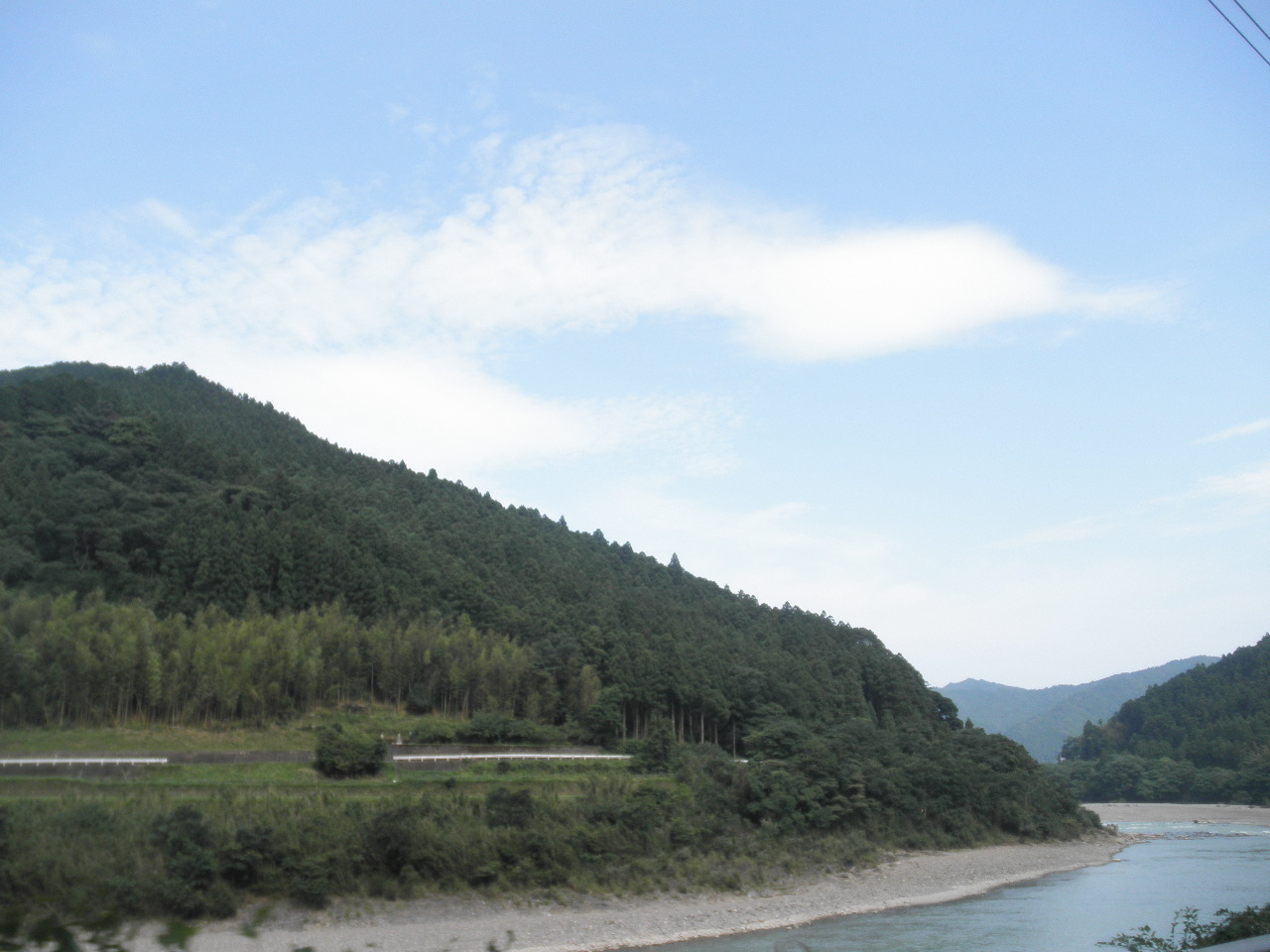
Naka River at Wajiki

Naka (那賀町, Naka-chō) is a town located in Naka District, Tokushima Prefecture, Japan. As of 31 March 2022, the town had an estimated population of 7,597 in 3734 households and a population density of 11 persons per km^{2}. The total area of the town is 694.98 square kilometres (268.33 sq mi).

== Geography ==
Naka is located in southern of Tokushima Prefecture on the island of Shikoku. It is situated on the banks of the Naka River. Parts of the town are within the borders of the Tsurugisan Quasi-National Park, including areas such as Konose Gorge and the Tsurugisan Super Forest Road. In addition, Ogama Falls and Daitodorono Falls are scenic spots.

=== Neighbouring municipalities ===
Kōchi Prefecture

- Aki
- Kami
- Umaji

Tokushima Prefecture

- Anan
- Kamikatsu
- Kaiyō
- Kamiyama
- Katsuura
- Mima
- Minami
- Miyoshi

=== Climate ===
Naka has a humid subtropical climate (Köppen climate classification Cfa) with hot summers and cool winters. Precipitation is high, but there is a pronounced difference between the wetter summers and drier winters. The average annual temperature in Naka is 13.6 °C (56.5 °F). The average annual rainfall is 3,391.3 mm (133.52 in) with September as the wettest month. The temperatures are highest on average in August, at around 24.5 °C (76.1 °F), and lowest in January, at around 2.6 °C (36.7 °F). The highest temperature ever recorded in Naka was 39.0 °C (102.2 °F) on 18 August 2020; the coldest temperature ever recorded was −10.9 °C (12.4 °F) on 8 February 1984.

Climate data for Kito, Naka (1991−2020 normals, extremes 1979−present)
Month	Jan	Feb	Mar	Apr	May	Jun	Jul	Aug	Sep	Oct	Nov	Dec	Year
Record high °C (°F)	18.7 (65.7)	22.3 (72.1)	25.6 (78.1)	31.7 (89.1)	33.1 (91.6)	36.1 (97.0)	38.7 (101.7)	39.0 (102.2)	35.6 (96.1)	30.9 (87.6)	25.8 (78.4)	21.3 (70.3)	39.0 (102.2)
Mean daily maximum °C (°F)	9.0 (48.2)	10.3 (50.5)	14.1 (57.4)	19.4 (66.9)	23.7 (74.7)	25.9 (78.6)	30.0 (86.0)	30.8 (87.4)	26.6 (79.9)	21.6 (70.9)	16.2 (61.2)	11.0 (51.8)	19.9 (67.8)
Daily mean °C (°F)	2.6 (36.7)	3.9 (39.0)	7.4 (45.3)	12.5 (54.5)	16.9 (62.4)	20.3 (68.5)	24.0 (75.2)	24.5 (76.1)	21.1 (70.0)	15.6 (60.1)	9.8 (49.6)	4.5 (40.1)	13.6 (56.5)
Mean daily minimum °C (°F)	−2.0 (28.4)	−1.1 (30.0)	2.0 (35.6)	6.6 (43.9)	11.4 (52.5)	16.2 (61.2)	20.1 (68.2)	20.6 (69.1)	17.3 (63.1)	11.4 (52.5)	5.3 (41.5)	0.0 (32.0)	9.0 (48.2)
Record low °C (°F)	−8.5 (16.7)	−10.9 (12.4)	−6.8 (19.8)	−2.3 (27.9)	1.7 (35.1)	7.3 (45.1)	12.0 (53.6)	13.2 (55.8)	7.2 (45.0)	0.9 (33.6)	−3.0 (26.6)	−6.5 (20.3)	−10.9 (12.4)
Average precipitation mm (inches)	77.0 (3.03)	108.2 (4.26)	176.2 (6.94)	204.9 (8.07)	277.4 (10.92)	398.7 (15.70)	479.6 (18.88)	546.8 (21.53)	611.2 (24.06)	283.5 (11.16)	131.4 (5.17)	96.4 (3.80)	3,391.3 (133.52)
Average precipitation days (≥ 1.0 mm)	6.6	7.7	11.2	10.5	11.4	15.0	13.9	13.8	13.9	10.3	7.8	6.6	128.7
Mean monthly sunshine hours	171.8	165.0	188.8	196.1	194.6	128.3	147.2	171.9	130.4	156.8	157.5	164.3	1,972.7
Source: Japan Meteorological Agency

== Demographics ==
Per Japanese census data, the population of Naka in 2020 is 7,367 people. Naka has been conducting censuses since 1920.

Historical population
Year	Pop.	±%
1920	18,805	—
1925	18,757	−0.3%
1930	18,746	−0.1%
1935	19,075	+1.8%
1940	19,210	+0.7%
1945	21,836	+13.7%
1950	22,909	+4.9%
1955	24,713	+7.9%
1960	23,279	−5.8%
1965	20,785	−10.7%
1970	16,947	−18.5%
1975	15,364	−9.3%
1980	14,360	−6.5%
1985	13,998	−2.5%
1990	13,255	−5.3%
1995	12,572	−5.2%
2000	11,893	−5.4%
2005	10,695	−10.1%
2010	9,322	−12.8%
2015	8,402	−9.9%
2020	7,367	−12.3%
Naka population statistics

== History ==
As with all of Tokushima Prefecture, the area of Naka was part of ancient Awa Province. During the Edo period, the area was part of the holdings of Tokushima Domain ruled by the Hachisuka clan from their seat at Tokushima Castle. The villages of Aioi (相生村) and Wajjiki (鷲敷村) were established within Naka District, Tokushima with the creation of the modern municipalities system on October 1, 1889. Wajiki was elevated town status on July 10, 1908, followed by Aioi on September 30, 1956. Naka was founded on March 1, 2005, from the merger of the towns of Aioi, Wajiki, and Kaminaka and the villages of Kisawa and Kito, all from Naka District.

== Government ==
Naka has a mayor-council form of government with a directly elected mayor and a unicameral town council of 14 members. Naka contributes one member to the Tokushima Prefectural Assembly. In terms of national politics, the town is part of Tokushima 1st district of the lower house of the Diet of Japan.

== Economy ==
The economy of Naka is largely agricultural. Otsuka Pharmaceutical has a large facility in Naka.

== Education ==
Naka has four public elementary schools and three public middle schools operated by the town government and one public high school operated by the Tokushima Prefectural Department of Education.

== Transportation ==
=== Railway ===
Naka has no passenger railway service. Kuwano Station in neighboring Anan or Hiwasa Station in neighboring Minami, both on the JR Shikoku Mugi Line are the closest stations.

=== Highways ===
- National Route 193
- National Route 194

== Local attractions ==
- Tsurugisan Quasi-National Park

== Notable people from Naka ==
- Taiki Nakago, baseball pitcher
- Masatoshi Sanma, slalom canoer
