= Onigatani Saiji =

Japanese sumo wrestler (1855–1931)

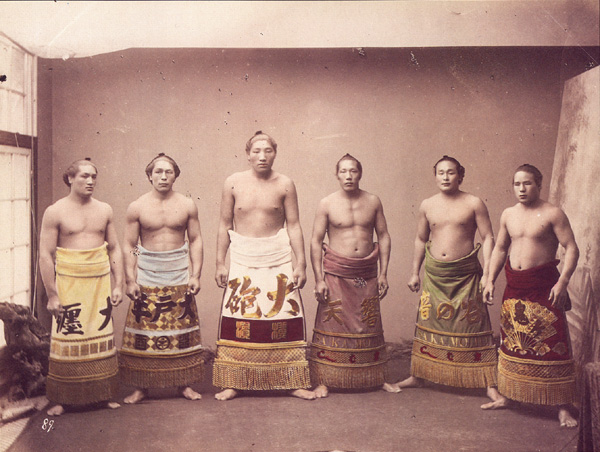
- Onigatani (far right) as a maegashira

Personal information
- Native name: 鬼ヶ谷 才治
- Born: Saiji Suzuki; April 19, 1855 Ehime, Japan
- Died: February 2, 1931 (aged 75)
- Height: 1.63 m (5 ft 4 in)
- Weight: 80 kg (180 lb)

Sport
- Sport: Sumo
- Retired: January, 1907
- Heya: Ikazuchi
- Record: 113-125-146-29draws-13holds
- Debut: January, 1886
- Highest rank: Komusubi (May 1891)
- Updated on May 2008

Onigatani Saiji (鬼ヶ谷才治, April 19, 1855 – February 2, 1931) was a Japanese sumo wrestler who is known for being active in the top makuuchi division at the age of 51, which is a record after the beginning of the Meiji era.

== Career ==
At first, he joined Tokitsukaze stable in Osaka sumo but was recruited by former yokozuna Umegatani I and moved to Ikazuchi stable in Tokyo sumo. From January 1887, he recorded a 20-year career in makuuchi. He was the oldest active wrestler in makuuchi from January 1897 when he was 41 years old. He retired in January 1907 when he was 51 years old. He was specially awarded a silver cup by the Sumo Association. He also trained future yokozuna Umegatani II.

== Top division record ==
Onigatani Saiji
-	Spring	Summer
1887	x	East Maegashira #8; 5–4–1
1888	East Maegashira #4; 5–3–1; 1h	East Maegashira #2; 3–4–3
1889	East Maegashira #5; 3–4–2; 1d	East Maegashira #4; 3–4–1; 2h
1890	East Maegashira #3; 3–0–7	West Maegashira #1; 4–3–1; 1d 1h
1891	West Maegashira #1; 4–5–1	West Komusubi; 5–3–1; 1d
1892	West Komusubi; 1–1–8	West Maegashira #2; 0–2–7; 1d
1893	Sat out	West Maegashira #5; 3–6–1
1894	West Maegashira #7; 2–4–1; 2d 1h	Maegashira #10; 2–1–2; 1h
1895	West Maegashira #8; 0–3–6; 1d	West Maegashira #12; 5–0–4; 1d
1896	West Maegashira #4; 2–2–4; 2d	West Maegashira #3; 2–7–1
1897	West Maegashira #7; 1–1–7; 1h	West Maegashira #10; 3–2–1; 1d
1898	West Maegashira #7; 6–3–1	East Maegashira #2; 2–2–6
1899	West Maegashira #2; 1–8–1	West Maegashira #4; 5–3–1; 1d
1900	West Maegashira #3; 2–0–8	West Maegashira #4; 4–3–1; 1d 1h
1901	East Maegashira #3; 2–6–1; 1d	West Maegashira #6; 3–6–1
1902	East Maegashira #8; 2–4–2; 2d	East Maegashira #8; 5–2–1; 1d 1h
1903	East Maegashira #1; 0–1–9	East Maegashira #5; 2–4–1; 3d
1904	East Maegashira #10; 6–0–2; 2h	Sat out
1905	East Maegashira #5; 3–5–1; 1d	East Maegashira #7; 2–4–1; 2d 1h
1906	East Maegashira #9; 3–6–1	East Maegashira #11; 1–3–5; 1d
1907	East Maegashira #14; Retired; 0–0	x
Record given as win-loss-absent Top Division Champion Top Division Runner-up Retired Lower Divisions Key:d=Draw(s) (引分); h=Hold(s) (預り); Divisions: Makuuchi — Jūryō — Makushita — Sandanme — Jonidan — Jonokuchi Makuuchi ranks: Yokozuna — Ōzeki — Sekiwake — Komusubi — Maegashira

== See also ==
- Glossary of sumo terms
- List of past sumo wrestlers
