= Hanoura, Tokushima =

Dissolved municipality in Tokushima prefecture, Japan

Flag of Hanoura, Tokushima

Hanoura (羽ノ浦町, Hanoura-chō) was a town located in Naka District, Tokushima Prefecture, Japan.

As of 2003, the town had an estimated population of 12,056 and a density of 1,415.02 persons per km^{2}. The total area was 8.52 km^{2}.

On March 20, 2006, Hanoura, along with the town of Nakagawa (also from Naka District), was merged into the expanded city of Anan.
