= Yuki, Tokushima =

Dissolved municipality in Tokushima prefecture, Japan

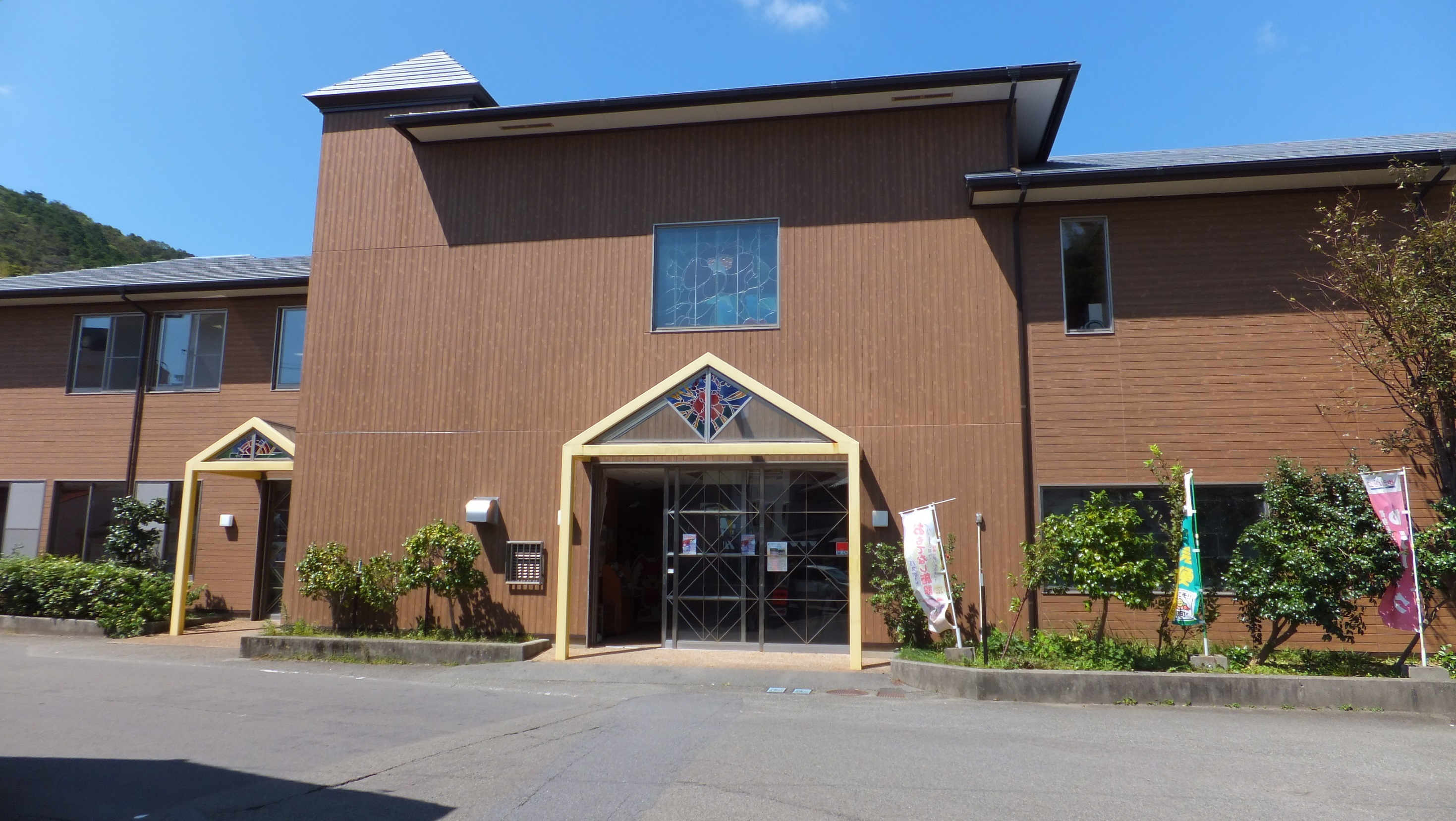
Yuki Station in 2015

Yuki (由岐町, Yuki-chō) was a town located in Kaifu District, Tokushima Prefecture, Japan.

As of 2003, the town had an estimated population of 3,356 and a density of 144.91 persons per km^{2}. The total area was 23.16 km^{2}.

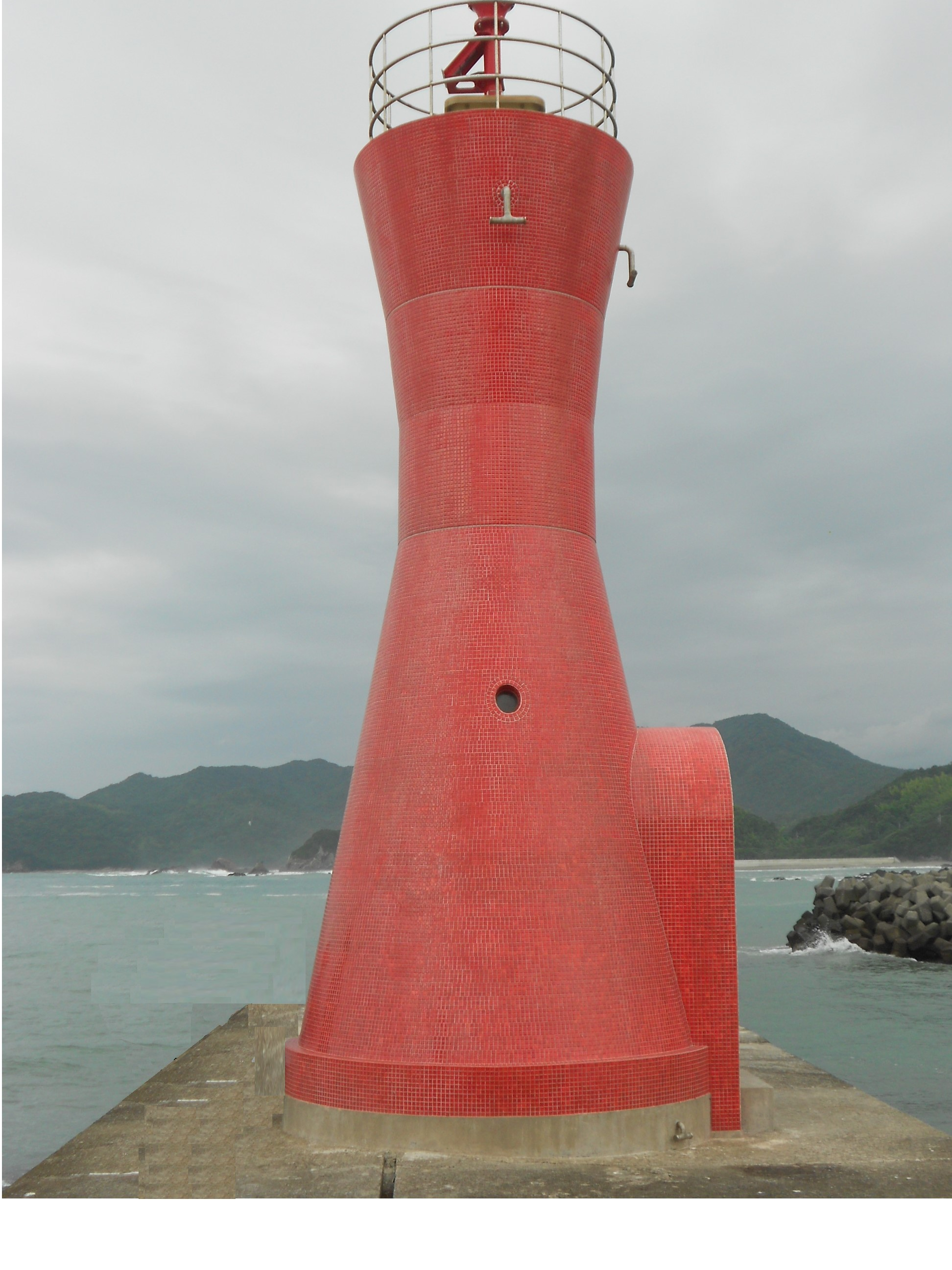
Yuki Lighthouse

On March 31, 2006, Yuki, along with the town of Hiwasa (also from Kaifu District), was merged to create the town of Minami.
