= Umegatani Tōtarō II =

Japanese sumo wrestler

Umegatani Tōtarō
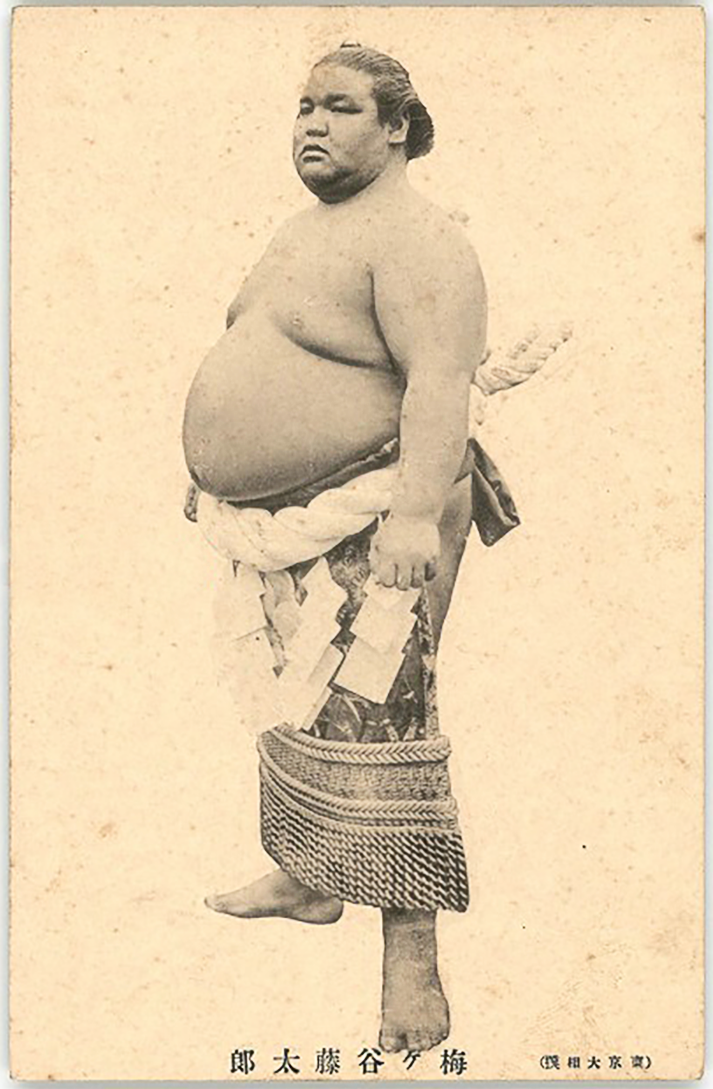
- Umegatani, circa 1912

Personal information
- Native name: 梅ヶ谷 藤太郎
- Born: Oshida Otojirō; March 11, 1878 Toyama, Japan
- Died: September 2, 1927 (aged 49)
- Height: 1.68 m (5 ft 6 in)
- Weight: 158 kg (348 lb)

Sport
- Sport: Sumo
- Retired: May, 1915
- Heya: Ikazuchi
- Record: 168-27-116; 47draws-2holds(Makuuchi)
- Debut: June, 1892
- Highest rank: Yokozuna (June, 1903)
- Elder name: Ikazuchi
- Championships: 3 (Makuuchi, unofficial)
- Updated on June 2020

Umegatani Tōtarō II (梅ヶ谷 藤太郎; March 11, 1878 – September 2, 1927) was a Japanese professional sumo wrestler from Toyama City, Toyama Prefecture. He was the sport's 20th yokozuna. Umegatani had a great rivalry with fellow yokozuna Hitachiyama Taniemon. Their era was known as the Ume-Hitachi Era and it brought sumo to heights of popularity never before seen in the Meiji period.

== Career ==
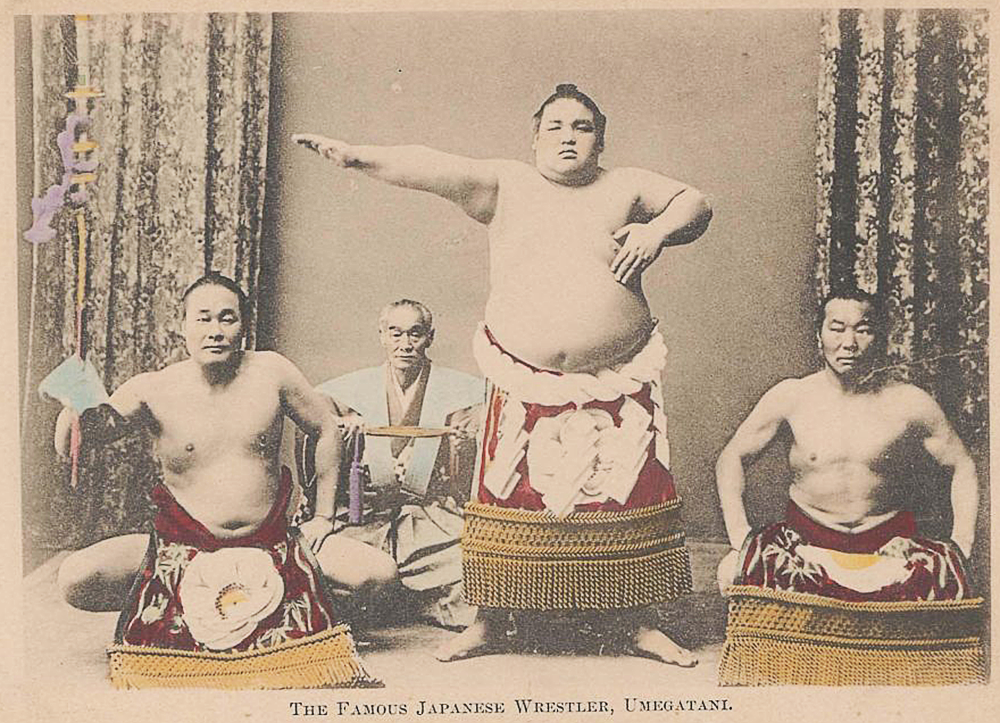
Yokozuna Umegatani Tōtarō II, c. 1903

He was born Oshida Otojirō (押田 音次郎), but later changed his name to Koe Otomatsu (小江 音松). In 1891, he was spotted by a touring troupe of wrestlers led by ōzeki Tsurugizan. Because he scouted him, the ōzeki asked his master to recruit him into their stable. Oshida was later adopted by the 15th yokozuna Umegatani and joined his Ikazuchi stable in June 1892 at the age of 14. His father was initially reluctant to let him join at such a young age but Umegatani Tōtarō I personally guaranteed his well-being.

In the stable, he was trained by Onigatani. He rose through the ranks quickly, making his jūryō debut in January 1897 and reaching the top makuuchi division in January 1898. Initially wrestling under the shikona name of Umenotani Otomatsu (梅ノ谷 音松), he officially took on the Umegatani Tōtarō name before his fourth tournament as an ōzeki in January 1902. He met Hitachiyama in May 1903 when both ōzeki were undefeated. The clash caused great excitement throughout Japan. Although Umegatani lost the match, after the tournament both he and Hitachiyama were promoted to yokozuna, Umegatani's promotion being awarded at Hitachiyama's insistence.

Umegatani had reached sumo's highest rank at the age of 25 years and 3 months, making him the youngest ever yokozuna at that time. The record stood until the promotion of Terukuni in 1942.

He had the best record in at least three championships before June 1909, when the yūshō system was established by the Mainichi Shimbun newspaper (the Japan Sumo Association officially recognised the system in 1926). There were two other instances where Umegatani achieved championship level performances not recorded as such by all sources. In the first, in the summer 1898 tournament, Umegatani tied ōzeki Asashio Taro I with a 7–1–1–1 draw record. Also, in the spring 1904 tournament, Umegatani finished with a record of 7–1–1 and 1 hold, slightly better than west yokozuna Hitachiyama Taniemon's 7-1-2 record, and a number of sources include this as an unofficial championship. Umegatani had the best record in the 1909 spring tournament, the last tournament before the yūshō system began in June 1909. Although he did not win any championships officially, he was given a prize frame in honor of his contribution when he retired in June 1915. This was his prize frame for his career from between the June 1909 tournament and the January 1910 tournament. His bouts were more masterly than his record because his techniques were orthodox methods. Although he was extremely heavy for his short height, he showed great skill.

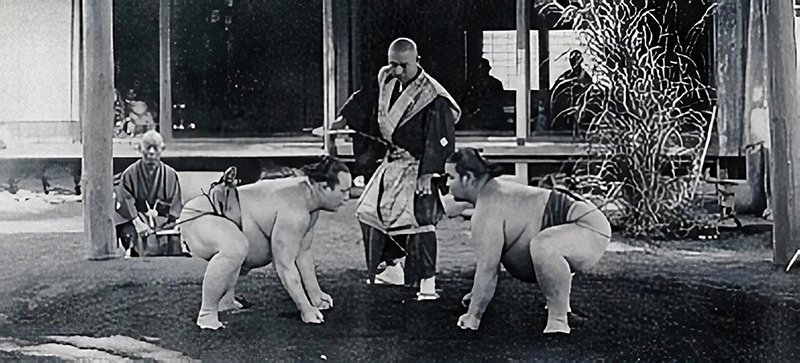
Umegatani (right) vs Hitachiyama

He missed many bouts in his later career due to illness, retiring at the age of 37. In the top makuuchi division, he won 168 bouts and lost 27 bouts, recording a winning percentage of 86.2. So many people wished to attend his retirement ceremony that it was held over three days. He died at the age of 49 whilst still active in sumo as a judge and head of Ikazuchi stable. The stable folded upon his death.

== Top division record ==
- Some sources record two more of Umegatani's tournaments as having won or tied the tournament. See above.

Umegatani Tōtarō II
-	Spring	Summer
1898	West Maegashira #5; 5–2–1; 1d 1h	West Maegashira #2; 7–1–1; 1d
1899	West Komusubi; 7–1–1; 1d	West Sekiwake; 6–2–1; 1d
1900	West Komusubi; 5–2–1; 2d	East Ōzeki; 6–1–2; 1d
1901	West Ōzeki; 8–1–1	West Ōzeki; 6–2–1; 1d
1902	East Ōzeki; 8–0–1; 1d Unofficial	East Ōzeki; 8–1–1
1903	East Ōzeki; 4–0–5; 1d	East Ōzeki; 8–1–1
1904	East Yokozuna; 7–1–1; 1h	East Yokozuna; 6–1–2; 1d
1905	East Yokozuna; 8–1–1	East Yokozuna; 5–0–5
1906	East Yokozuna; 7–1–1; 1d	East Yokozuna; 7–0–2; 1d
1907	East Yokozuna; 1–0–9	East Yokozuna; 6–2–1; 1d
1908	East Yokozuna; 8–0–1; 1d Unofficial	East Yokozuna; 7–1–1; 1d
1909	West Yokozuna; 7–0–2; 1d Unofficial	West Yokozuna; 5–0–5
1910	West Yokozuna; 0–1–9	West Yokozuna; 0–0–9; 1d
1911	East Yokozuna; 3–1; 6d	Sat out
1912	East Yokozuna; 5–1; 4d	West Yokozuna; 1–1–5-3d
1913	West Yokozuna; 4–1; 5d	West Yokozuna; 0–1–8; 1d
1914	East Yokozuna; 2–0–6; 2d	West Yokozuna; 0–0–9; 1d
1915	West Yokozuna; 1–0–7; 2d	East Yokozuna; Retired; 0–0–10
Record given as win-loss-absent Top Division Champion Top Division Runner-up Retired Lower Divisions Key:d=Draw(s) (引分); h=Hold(s) (預り); Divisions: Makuuchi — Jūryō — Makushita — Sandanme — Jonidan — Jonokuchi Makuuchi ranks: Yokozuna — Ōzeki — Sekiwake — Komusubi — Maegashira

*Championships for the best record in a tournament were not recognized or awarded before the 1909 summer tournament and the above unofficial championships are historically conferred. For more information see yūshō.

== See also ==
- Glossary of sumo terms
- List of past sumo wrestlers
- List of yokozuna

Preceded by Hitachiyama Taniemon	20th Yokozuna; 1903–1915	Succeeded by Wakashima Gonshirō
Yokozuna is not a successive rank, and more than one wrestler can hold the title at once
