= Kaminaka, Tokushima =

Dissolved municipality in Tokushima prefecture, Japan

Kaminaka (上那賀町, Kaminaka-chō) was a town located in Naka District, Tokushima Prefecture, Japan.

As of 2003, the town had an estimated population of 2,242 and a density of 12.79 persons per km^{2}. The total area was 175.27 km^{2}.

On March 1, 2005, Kaminaka, along with the towns of Aioi and Wajiki, and the villages of Kisawa and Kito (all from Naka District), was merged to create the city of Naka.
