= Yamakawa, Tokushima =

Dissolved municipality in Tokushima prefecture, Japan

Yamakawa (山川町, Yamakawa-chō) was a town located in Oe District, Tokushima Prefecture, Japan.

As of 2003, the town had an estimated population of 11,456 and a population density of 271.02 persons per km^{2}. The total area was 42.27 km^{2}.

On October 1, 2004, Yamakawa, along with the towns of Kamojima and Kawashima, and the village of Misato (all from Oe District), was merged to create the new city of Yoshinogawa.
