= Nakagawa, Tokushima =

Dissolved municipality in Tokushima prefecture, Japan

Nakagawa (那賀川町, Nakagawa-chō) was a town located in Naka District, Tokushima Prefecture, Japan.

As of 2003, the town had an estimated population of 10,576 and a density of 567.08 persons per km^{2}. The total area was 18.65 km^{2}.

On March 20, 2006, Nakagawa, along with the town of Hanoura (also from Naka District), was merged into the expanded city of Anan.
