= Wajiki, Tokushima =

Dissolved municipality in Tokushima prefecture, Japan

Wajiki (鷲敷町, Wajiki-chō) was a town located in Naka District, Tokushima Prefecture, Japan.

As of 2003, the town had an estimated population of 3,240 and a population density of 107.50 persons per km^{2}. The total area was 30.14 km^{2}.

On March 1, 2005, Wajiki, along with the towns of Aioi and Kaminaka, and the villages of Kisawa and Kito (all from Naka District), was merged to create the city of Naka.
