= Hiwasa, Tokushima =

Dissolved municipality in Tokushima prefecture, Japan

Hiwasa (日和佐町, Hiwasa-chō) was a town located in Kaifu District, Tokushima Prefecture, Japan.

As of 2003, the town had an estimated population of 5,563 and a density of 47.27 persons per km^{2}. The total area was 117.69 km^{2}.

On March 31, 2006, Hiwasa, along with the town of Yuki (also from Kaifu District), was merged to create the town of Minami.
