= Aioi, Tokushima =

Dissolved municipality in Tokushima prefecture, Japan

Aioi (相生町, Aioi-chō) was a town located in Naka District, Tokushima Prefecture, Japan.

As of 2003, the town had an estimated population of 3,208 and a density of 31.75 persons per km^{2}. The total area was 101.04 km^{2}.

On March 1, 2005, Aioi, along with the towns of Kaminaka and Wajiki, and the villages of Kisawa and Kito (all from Naka District), was merged to create the town of Naka.
