= Kawashima, Tokushima =

Kawashima 川島町
- Former town
- Interactive map of Kawashima
- Country: Japan
- Prefecture: Tokushima
- District: Oe
- Merged into Yoshinogawa: October 1, 2004; 22 years ago

Area
  - Total: 17.69 km^{2} (6.83 sq mi)

Population
  - Estimate (2003): 8,484
  - Density: 479.59/km^{2} (1,242.1/sq mi)

Kawashima (Japanese: 川島町, romanized: Kawashima-machi, pronounced [kaɰaɕima matɕi]) was a town located in Oe District, Tokushima Prefecture, Japan.

As of 2003, the town had an estimated population of 8,484 and a population density of 479.59 persons per km^{2}. The total area was 17.69 square kilometres (6.83 mi^{2}).

On October 1, 2004, Kawashima, along with the towns of Kamojima and Yamakawa, and the village of Misato (all from Oe District), was merged to create the new city of Yoshinogawa.
