= Taiki Nakago =

Japanese baseball player

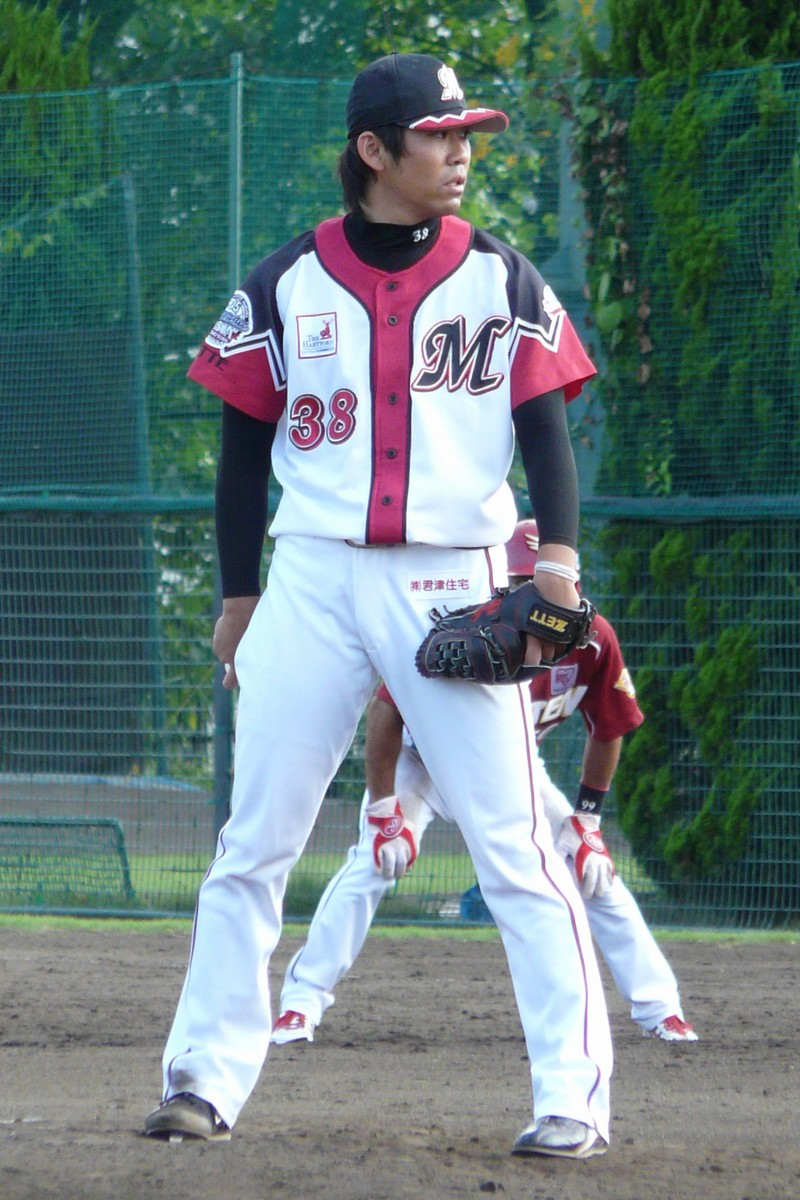
- Nakago with the Chiba Lotte Marines
- Pitcher
- Born: September 21, 1984 (age 41); Naka District, Tokushima
- Bats: Right Throws: Right

debut
- 2007, for the Chiba Lotte Marines

Career statistics (through 2013 season)
- WHIP: 1.302
- ERA: 3.31
- SO: 31
- Stats at Baseball Reference

Teams
- Chiba Lotte Marines (2007–2013); Saitama Seibu Lions (2014–2015)

Taiki Nakago (中郷 大樹, Nakagō Taiki) is a former Japanese professional baseball pitcher. He was born on September 21, 1984. He is currently playing for the Saitama Seibu Lions of the NPB.
