= Mikamo, Tokushima =

Dissolved municipality in Tokushima prefecture, Japan

Mikamo (三加茂町, Mikamo-chō) was a town located in Miyoshi District, Tokushima Prefecture, Japan.

As of 2003, the town had an estimated population of 9,926 and a density of 146.53 persons per km^{2}. The total area was 67.74 km^{2}.

On March 1, 2006, Mikamo, along with the town of Miyoshi (also from Miyoshi District), was merged to create the town of Higashimiyoshi.
