= Miyoshi, Tokushima (town) =

Dissolved municipality in Tokushima prefecture, Japan

Miyoshi (三好町, Miyoshi-chō) was a town located in Miyoshi District, Tokushima Prefecture, Japan.

As of 2003, the town had an estimated population of 6,069 and a density of 110.67 persons per km^{2}. The total area was 54.84 km^{2}.

On March 1, 2006, Miyoshi, along with the town of Mikamo (also from Miyoshi District), was merged to create the town of Higashimiyoshi.
