= Misato, Tokushima =

Dissolved municipality in Tokushima prefecture, Japan

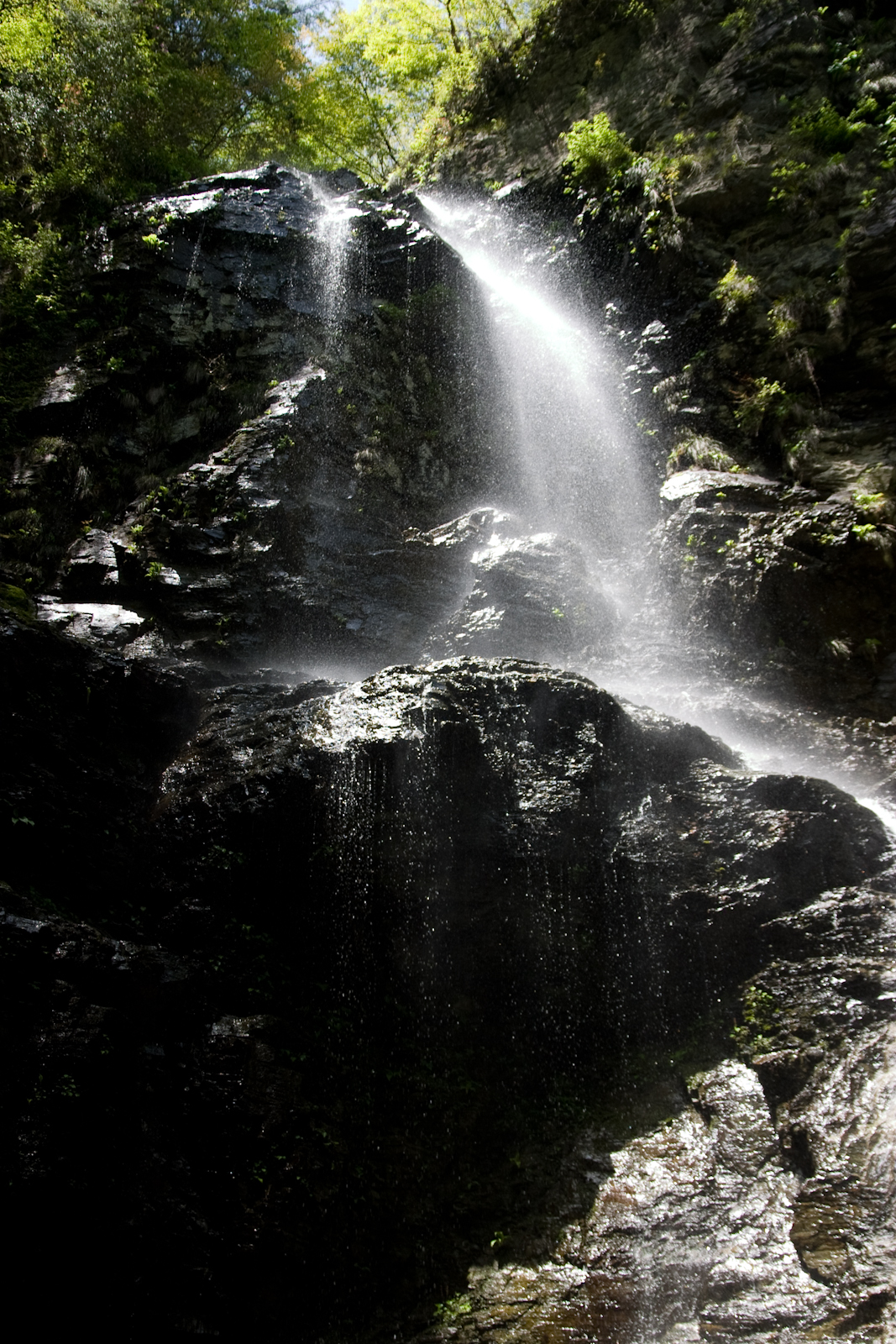
The Boroboro Falls located in Miasto

Misato (美郷村, Misato-son) was a village located in Oe District, Tokushima Prefecture, Japan.

As of 2003, the village had an estimated population of 1,310 and a density of 25.96 persons per km^{2}. The total area was 50.47 km^{2}.

On October 1, 2004, Misato, along with the towns of Kamojima, Kawashima and Yamakawa (all from Oe District), was merged to create the new city of Yoshinogawa.
