= Kisawa, Tokushima =

Dissolved municipality in Tokushima prefecture, Japan

Kisawa (木沢村, Kisawa-son) was a village located in Naka District, Tokushima Prefecture, Japan.

As of 2003, the village had an estimated population of 901 and a density of 5.81 persons per km^{2}. The total area was 154.97 km^{2}.

On March 1, 2005, Kisawa, along with the towns of Aioi, Kaminaka and Wajiki, and the village of Kito (all from Naka District), was merged to create the city of Naka.
