= Naka District, Tokushima =

District in Tokushima prefecture, Japan

Coordinates: 33.818°N 134.244°E

Location in Tokushima Prefecture See SVG File with names

Naka (那賀郡, Naka-gun) is a district located in Tokushima, Japan.

As of June 1, 2019, the district has an estimated population of 7,549 and a population density of 10.9 inhabitants per square kilometre (28 inhabitants per square mile). The total area is 694.98 km^{2} (268.33 sq mi).

== Towns and villages ==
- Naka

== Mergers ==
- On March 1, 2005 the towns of Aioi, Kaminaka and Wajiki, and the villages of Kisawa and Kito merged to form the new town of Naka.
- On March 20, 2006 the towns of Hanoura and Nakagawa merged into the city of Anan.
