= Oe District, Tokushima =

Oe 麻植郡
- Former district
- Country: Japan
- Prefecture: Tokushima
- Dissolved, replaced by Yoshinogawa city: October 1, 2004; 22 years ago

Area
  - Total: 144.19 km^{2} (55.67 sq mi)

Population
  - Estimate (2003): 46,231
  - Density: 320.63/km^{2} (830.4/sq mi)

Oe (麻植郡, Oe-gun) was a district located in Tokushima Prefecture, Japan.

As of 2003, the district had an estimated population of 46,231 and a density of 320.63 persons per km^{2}. The total area was 144.19 square kilometres (55.67 mi^{2}).

== Towns and villages ==
- Kamojima
- Kawashima
- Misato
- Yamakawa

== Merger ==
- On October 1, 2004 - the towns of Kamojima, Kawashima and Yamakawa, and the village of Misato were merged to create the city of Yoshinogawa. Therefore, Oe District was dissolved as a result of this merger.
