= Kito, Tokushima =

Dissolved municipality in Naka district, Tokushima prefecture, Japan

Kitō (木頭村, Kitō-son) was a village located in Naka District, Tokushima Prefecture, Japan.

As of 2003, the village had an estimated population of 1,743 and a density of 7.47 persons per km^{2}. The total area was 233.44 km^{2}.

On March 1, 2005, Kitō, along with the towns of Aioi, Kaminaka and Wajiki, and the village of Kisawa (all from Naka District), was merged to create the city of Naka.
