= Kamojima, Tokushima =

Dissolved municipality in Tokushima prefecture, Japan

Kamojima (鴨島町, Kamojima-chō) was a town located in Oe District, Tokushima Prefecture, Japan.

As of 2003, the town had an estimated population of 24,981 and a population density of 739.96 persons per km^{2}. The total area was 33.76 km^{2}.

On October 1, 2004, Kamojima, along with the towns of Kawashima and Yamakawa, and the village of Misato (all from Oe District), was merged to create the new city of Yoshinogawa.
