= Shiromine-ji =

- 白峯寺
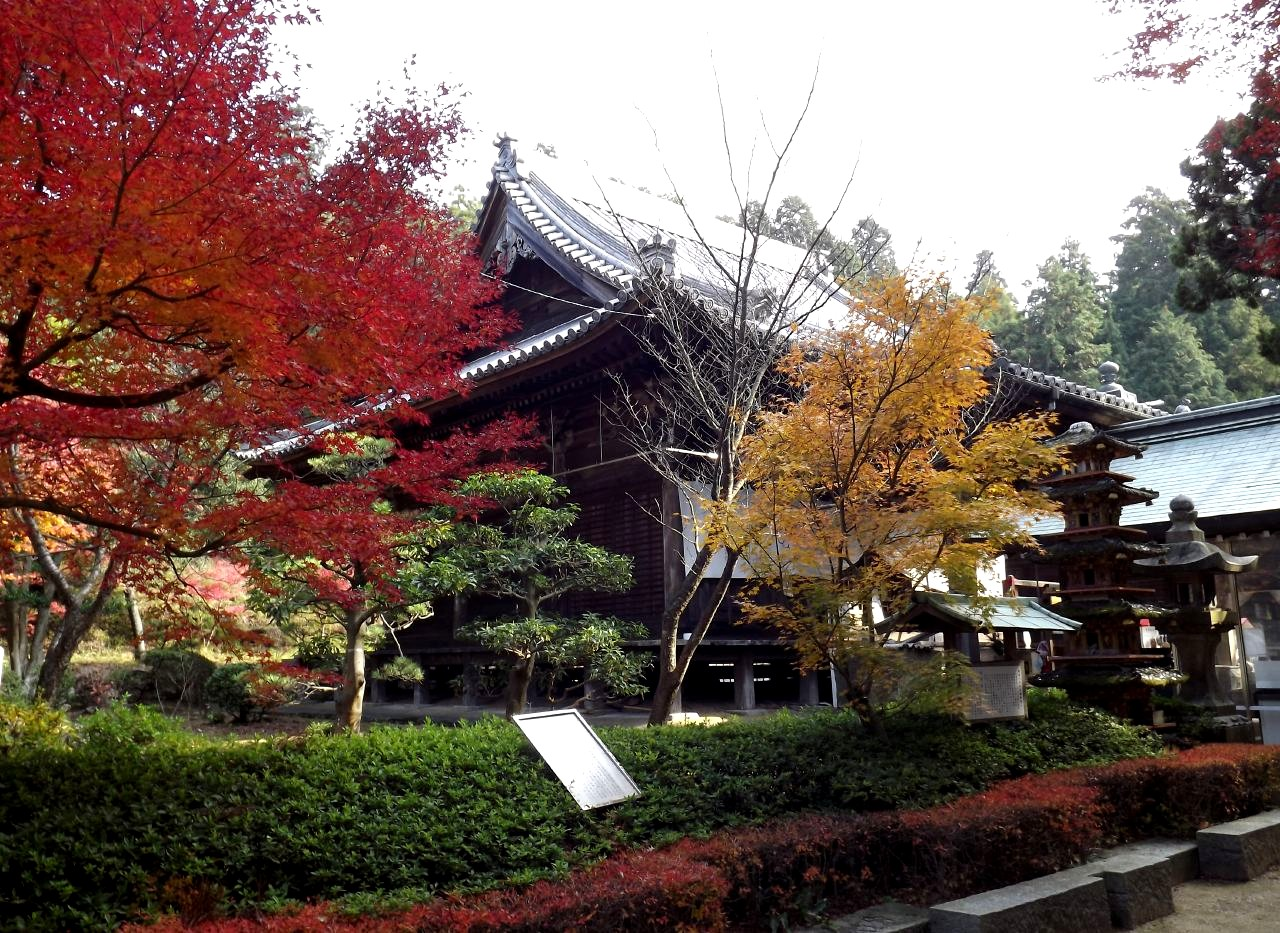

Religion
- Affiliation: Buddhism
- Sect: Shingon

Location
- Country: Japan
- Interactive map of Shiromine-ji

Shiromine-ji (Japanese: 白峯寺) is a temple belonging to the Omuro School of Shingon Buddhism, situated near an elevation of 271 meters on the slopes of Mt. Shiramine, located within the Goshikidai highlands in Sakaide, Kagawa Prefecture. Its formal mountain name is Ryōshōzan, and its institutional name is Dōrinin. The principal deity is Senju Kannon Bosatsu (Thousand-armed Kannon). It serves as the 81st temple on the Shikoku 88-Temple Pilgrimage.

- Mantra of the Principal Deity: Om, Bajara Tarama Kiriku
- Pilgrimage Verse (Goeika): "Amidst the temple grounds—cold with frost and white with dew—resound the voices chanting the sacred Name."
- Pilgrimage Seals (Nōkyō-in): The Temple's Principal Deity; Bishamonten (at the Inner Sanctuary); *Juichimen Kannon (the personal devotional image of Emperor Sutoku); Shiramine Daigongen Sagamibō; and the "Great Wish Fulfilled" seal (marking the completion of the pilgrimage).

Hours for Pilgrimage Seal Reception: 8:30 AM – 5:00 PM

== Overview ==
Guardian deities for all twelve signs of the Chinese zodiac are enshrined in separate halls throughout the complex. Adjacent to the temple grounds lies Shiramine Imperial Mausoleum—the only imperial mausoleum in the entire Shikoku region—where the Seishin-sai (a ceremonial festival; see details below) is held annually starting at 9:00 AM on September 21st.

Visitors can enjoy the beauty of flowers throughout the year; the temple is particularly renowned for its cherry blossoms in spring, hydrangeas in summer, and vibrant autumn foliage, drawing large numbers of worshippers. Within the precincts, sacred pilgrim hymns (Goeika) are played, serving to heighten the spiritual atmosphere for those undertaking the Shikoku Pilgrimage.

Furthermore, since ancient times, the temple's principal deity—the Thousand-Armed Kannon Bodhisattva—has been revered as a "Substitute Kannon" (a deity believed to take upon itself the suffering of worshippers). The guardian deity, Shiramine Daigongen (also known as Sagamibo Daigongen—one of Japan's legendary "Eight Great Tengu"), is worshipped as a god of good fortune, business prosperity, and success in competitive endeavors. Additionally, Emperor Sutoku is venerated as a deity who helps sever negative ties, as well as a patron of success in the performing arts and academic studies.

== History ==
According to temple tradition, Kūkai (Kōbō-Daishi) visited this site in the sixth year of the Kōnin era (815). He buried a Nyoihōju (wish-fulfilling jewel) at the summit of Mount Shiramine (elevation 357 m), dug a sacred well (akai) to draw water for Buddhist offerings, and offered a prayer for the salvation of all sentient beings. Furthermore, it is said that Enchin (Chishō-Daishi) ascended the mountain in the second year of the Jōgan era (860) after observing an auspicious light shining from the summit. There, he received a divine oracle from the local guardian deity—a white-haired old man—and subsequently carved a statue of Senju Kannon Bosatsu (Thousand-Armed Kannon) from a miraculous tree. This tree had appeared in the Seto Inland Sea, radiating a mysterious light and emitting a fragrant aroma; Enchin enshrined the resulting statue as the temple's principal image and founded the main sanctuary.

Later, on the 26th day of the eighth lunar month in the second year of the Chōkan era (1164), Retired Emperor Sutoku passed away in exile in Sanuki Province. In accordance with his final wishes, his remains were cremated atop Chigo-dake—a peak situated above this temple—and a mausoleum was constructed there. Three years later, the monk Saigyō visited the site to offer prayers and perform memorial rites for the late emperor. Subsequently, in the second year of the Kenkyū era (1191), Emperor Go-Toba ordered the relocation of the Kinomarudono (Wooden-Circle Palace)—the residence at Tsutsumigaoka where the Retired Emperor had spent the final six years of his life—to a site near the mausoleum to serve as a memorial hall (Hokke-dō). Within this hall, he enshrined a self-portrait of the Retired Emperor that had been painted during the period of his confinement at Ninna-ji Temple in Kyoto. (Note: Although the Retired Emperor was a defeated commander in the Hōgen Rebellion, he had surrendered himself with the expectation that he would be permitted to renounce the world and live in quiet retirement in a corner of Kyoto; consequently, the self-portrait depicts him in the guise of a shaven-headed monk—a depiction that corresponds with the image publicly unveiled in 2014.) ...enshrined [the sacred object] and offered prayers for the immediate attainment of enlightenment. The temple's fortunes flourished, and its sub-temples eventually numbered as many as twenty-one; however, in the second year of the Eitoku era (1382), a fire broke out and consumed the majority of the complex. In the twenty-second year of the Oei era (1415), Emperor Go-Komatsu—desiring the salvation of the Retired Emperor's soul—donated an Imperial plaque bearing the inscription "Tonshō-ji" in his own calligraphy; thereafter, the temple came to be known as Tonshō-ji-dono. Subsequently, in the eighth year of the Enpō era (1680), the Tonshō-ji-dono and its Imperial Plaque Gate were reconstructed by Matsudaira Yorishige and Yoritsune, the lords of the Takamatsu Domain.

Emperor Kōmei, deeply concerned by the turmoil of the late Edo period, ordered that the spirit of Retired Emperor Sutoku be transferred to Kyoto in order to soothe his soul; however, he passed away on the 25th day of the 12th lunar month of the second year of the Keiō era (1866) before this wish could be realized. His son and successor, Emperor Meiji, carried out this dying wish; on the 26th day of the 8th lunar month of the fourth year of the Keiō era (1868), he dispatched Imperial Envoys to this temple, (Note: The Imperial Envoy, Major Counselor Nakain Michitomi, and the Deputy Envoy, Major General Sanjonishi Kimimitsu, had arrived at Sakaide Port the previous day.) and before the Imperial Tomb, the following Norito (Shinto ritual prayer) was recited: "The series of deplorable events that transpired during the Hōgen era were truly the very depths of sorrow. In accordance with the dying wish of Emperor Kōmei, a new palace has been constructed near the Kyoto Imperial Palace; therefore, we humbly request that you return to the capital and watch over the Emperor and the Imperial Court for all eternity." Furthermore, the Imperial Envoy brought back the self-portrait of the Retired Emperor—which had been kept at this temple—along with his cherished shō (mouth organ). They arrived in Kyoto on the 6th day of the 9th month of the lunar calendar. The very next day, Emperor Meiji paid a visit to offer his worship; and on the day following that—the 8th day of the 9th month of the lunar calendar—the era name was officially changed from Keiō to Meiji.

With the advent of the Meiji Restoration, the administration of the Shiramine Imperial Tomb was transferred from this temple to the jurisdiction of the Ministry of the Imperial Household. In the third year of the Meiji era (1870), the Jōchi-rei (Decree on the Surrender of Temple Lands) was promulgated; consequently, the temple's estate lands—with the exception of the immediate precincts—were confiscated, resulting in a complete loss of revenue. As a result, the temple's sub-temples—Ichijō-bō, Hōshaku-in, and Enpuku-in—were abolished (becoming haiji), leaving only Dōrin-in, which had served as the main residence (Honbō). Finally, in the sixth year of the Meiji era (1873), the temple's head priest left the priesthood to pursue a secular life, leaving the temple entirely without a resident priest. The previous year, an official directive had been issued declaring that any temple lacking both a congregation and a resident priest would be dissolved. Fearing that their own temple would suffer this same fate if matters remained unchanged, the parishioners petitioned for the appointment of a new head priest. Consequently, in the 11th year of the Meiji era (1878), the new head priest, Keidō Tachibana, took up his post, and the temple was thus spared from dissolution.

In that same year—Meiji 11 (1878)—acting upon a formal petition submitted by the Shinto chief priest of the time, the Ministry of Home Affairs issued a decision: the Chokugaku-mon (Imperial Plaque Gate) and the Tonshōjiden—structures that had previously constituted part of the temple grounds—were to be designated as Shiramine Shrine and established as an auxiliary shrine (Sessha) of Kotohira-gū (hereinafter referred to as "the Shrine"). Consequently, ownership of these structures was transferred from the temple to the Shrine. At that time, numerous temple treasures were also transferred to the Shrine (Note: Representative examples include: Nayotake Monogatari (an Important Cultural Property), standing statues of Tametomo and Tameyoshi, tachi swords, armor, poetry anthologies, and others.). Subsequently, the temple's head priest and parishioners, dissatisfied with this outcome, filed a lawsuit. Although the temple won the case in Meiji 17 (1884), it was not until Meiji 31 (1898) that Shiramine Shrine was finally returned to the temple and reinstated as the Tonshōjiden. Furthermore, at that time, only a very small fraction of the temple treasures that had previously been transferred to the Shrine were returned to the temple.

In Shōwa 40 (1965)—taking advantage of the momentum surrounding the 800th memorial anniversary of Emperor Sutoku—a group of volunteers from the local youth association filed a lawsuit against the Shrine, demanding the return of the treasures that had been transferred from the temple; however, they ultimately lost the case.

== Temple Precincts ==
=== Shiromine-ji ===
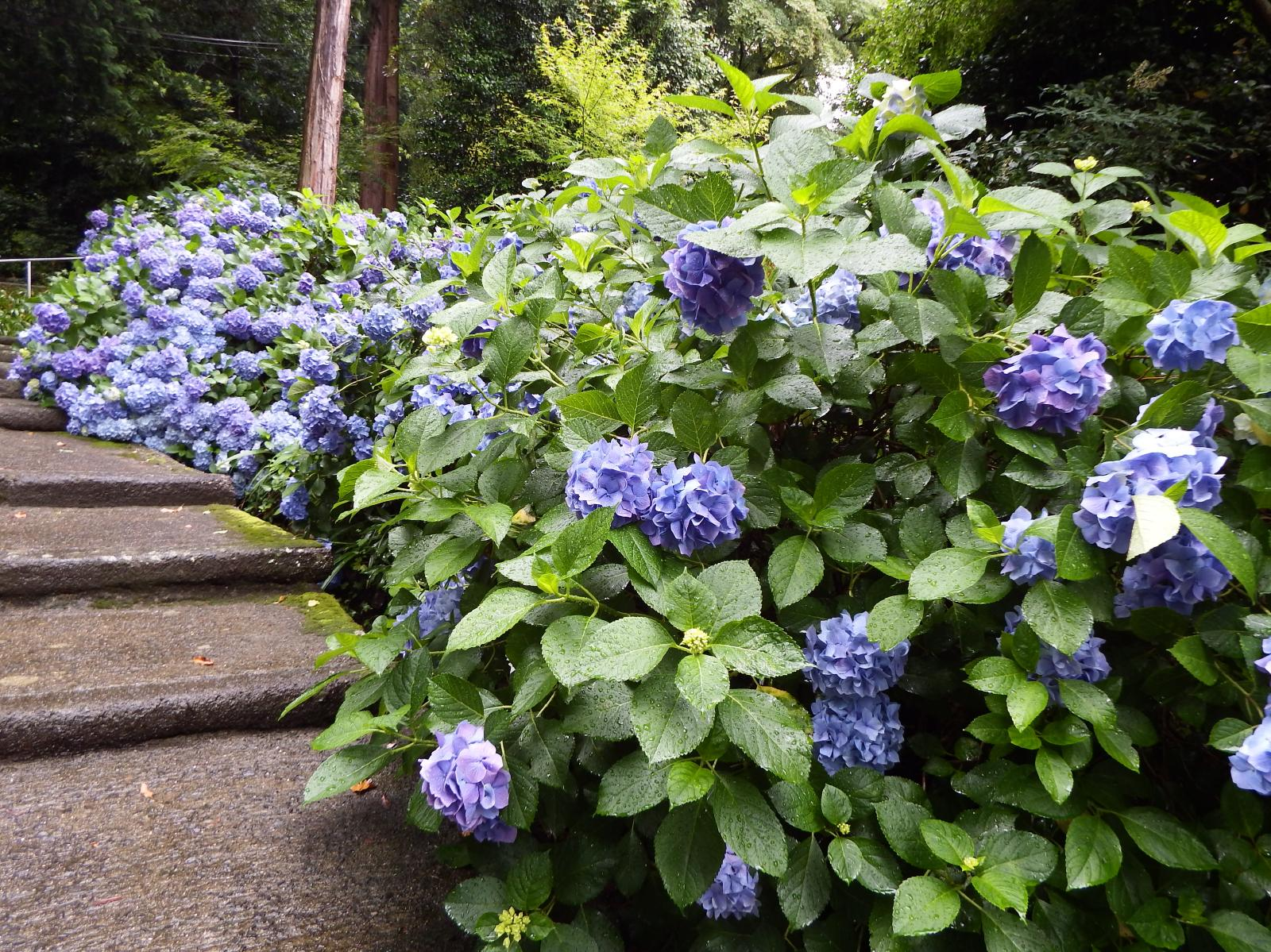
Hydrangeas

(Listed in order, descending from the upper grounds toward the exit)

- Main Hall (Hondo) [Important Cultural Property]: Rebuilt in Keicho 4 (1599). The principal image—the Thousand-armed Kannon—is unveiled to the public annually on the Sunday closest to July 10th (viewing is limited to the duration of the memorial service, beginning at 10:00 AM). The attendant deities are Aizen Myoo and Bato Kannon; however, both are hibutsu (secret images) and are not displayed.
- Daishi Hall (Daishido) [Important Cultural Property]: Rebuilt in Bunka 8 (1811). Enshrined within are Kobo Daishi (at the center), Chigo Daishi (on the left), and Shomen Kongo (on the right); all are hibutsu (secret images).
- Jizo Shrine: Enshrines a stone statue of Jizo Bodhisattva.
- Zennyo Ryuo Shrine: Rebuilt in Anei 6 (1777).
- Kyusha Myojin Shrine
- Buddha's Footprint Stone (Bussokuseki): Erected in Heisei 11 (1999). Located between the Main Hall and the Daishi Hall.
- Stone Yugi Pagoda: Erected in Bunsei 12 (1829). Located to the left of the Main Hall (when facing it).
- Amida Hall (Amidado) [Important Cultural Property]: Erected in Manji 4 (1661). Enshrined within are Amida Nyorai (at the center), flanked by the attendant deities Seishi Bodhisattva and Kannon Bodhisattva. Additionally, one thousand small statues of Amida Buddha are enshrined behind the main images.

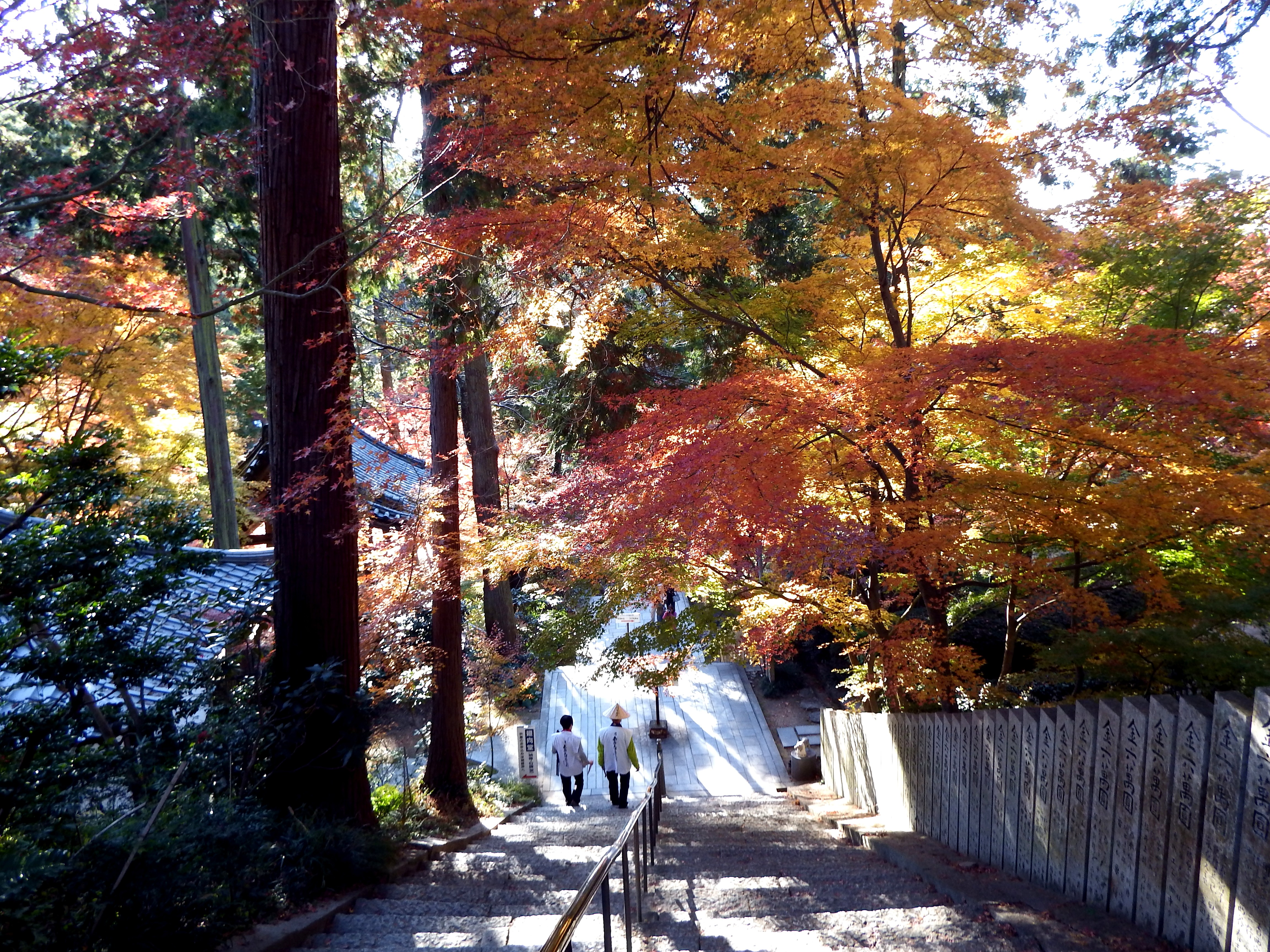
Autumn Foliage

- Gyosha Hall (Gyoshado) [Important Cultural Property]: Rebuilt in Anei 8 (1779). Enshrined within are En no Gyoja (at the center), surrounded by Enma-son (King Yama), the Ten Kings of Hell, Jizo Bodhisattva, and Kokuzo Bodhisattva.
- Eko-do (Memorial Hall): Built in 2003. Amida Nyorai is enshrined in the center, while the spirits of those receiving perpetual memorial services are venerated in the side niches. A perpetual memorial tomb and a general cemetery are located behind the hall.
- Yakushi-do (Hall of the Medicine Buddha) [Important Cultural Property]: Built in the early 19th century; a two-story structure. Enshrined within are Yakushi Nyorai (the Medicine Buddha) in the center, flanked by the attendant Bodhisattvas Nikko and Gekko; the Twelve Divine Generals (his retinue) are positioned in the foreground. Dainichi Nyorai of the Vajradhatu (Diamond Realm) is enshrined on the left, and Dainichi Nyorai of the Garbhadhatu (Womb Realm) is enshrined on the right; however, all of these statues are *hibutsu* (secret Buddhas) and are not displayed to the public.
- Shoro-do (Bell Tower): Reconstructed during the Meiji era.
- Benzaiten Shrine: Built in the early 19th century.
- Mizuko Jizo (Jizo for Deceased Children) / Chozuya (Purification Pavilion): Built in 1981.
- "Tamazusa" Tree: Legend has it that when Retired Emperor Sutoku, moved by the cry of a hototogisu (lesser cuckoo) and longing for the capital, composed a *waka* poem, the bird sensed his sentiments. In response, the hototogisu is said to have wrapped a leaf around its beak and sung in a hushed voice. Because this wrapped leaf resembled a tamazusa (a letter or missive), it came to be known as the "Hototogisu's Dropped Letter" or simply "Tamazusa." It is highly prized, as it is believed that carrying one of these leaves in one's pocket ensures the receipt of good news. (Source: Kamata Kyosaikai Local History Museum, 1978, § "Tamazusa no Ki"). The tree standing here today was planted to commemorate the original "Tamazusa" tree; the ancient original tree has since been donated to the Goshikidai Youth Nature Center in Kagawa Prefecture.
- Goma-do (Fire Ritual Hall): Built in 1986. Enshrined in the center are the Five Great Myo-o (Wisdom Kings) and Bishamonten; on the left are Fugen Bodhisattva, Kobo Daishi, and Zao Gongen; and on the right are Amida Nyorai, the memorial tablets of the successive lords of the Takamatsu Domain, and the memorial tablets of past head priests. A Nokyo-jo (sutra-offering reception office) is located within the hall. Since the Main Hall and the Daishi Hall are situated atop a long flight of stone steps, visitors with physical limitations or concerns regarding their legs and lower back may offer their prayers inside the hall, where a replica of the principal deity is located in the center and a statue of the Great Master (Daishi) stands to the left. *A wheelchair ramp is available.
- Treasure Hall: Built in 2003. It houses and displays various temple treasures, including designated cultural properties such as the Imperial Plaque (Chokugaku), which is itself a designated Important Cultural Property.
- Treasure Repository: Preserves sacred texts (Shogyo) from successive generations of abbots, as well as various documents and books related to the temple.
- Imperial Messenger Gate (Chokushimon) [Important Cultural Property] (Designated Accessory Structure): Built in the early 19th century.
- Lord's Gate (Onarimon) [Important Cultural Property]: Built in 1724 (9th year of the Kyoho era).
- Guest Hall (Kyakuden) [Important Cultural Property]: Built during the Enpo era (1673–1681). A large entrance vestibule was added around the mid-18th century.
- Tea Pavilion (Chado): Built in 1909 (42nd year of the Meiji era).
- Mountain Gate (Sanmon) — "Seven-Roof Gate" [Important Cultural Property] (Designated Accessory Structure): Built in the late 18th century. A Koraimon-style gate featuring a gabled roof.
- Shiramine Gosha Inari Shrine: Built in 1951 (26th year of the Showa era).
- Standing Statue of the Great Master in Training (Shugyo Daishi): Built in 1984 (59th year of the Showa era). To its left stands a stone monument inscribed with the haiku: "Shiramine no hana ni yado toru henro kana" (A pilgrim finds lodging amidst the flowers of Shiramine).
- Stone Thirteen-Story Pagoda [Important Cultural Property]: Consists of an East Pagoda and a West Pagoda. See below for further details.
- Replica Stone Statues of the Saigoku 33 Kannon Pilgrimage: Erected during the Meiji era. These stone statues are scattered along the approach road (vehicular route) leading to the parking lot.
- First Gate (Ichinomon): A pillar-style gate marking the entrance to the temple approach (vehicular route) from Prefectural Road 180. The *Gejō-ishi* (Stone Marker for Dismounting)—which was relocated from near the Shiramine Observatory in December 1958, restored to repair damaged sections, and subsequently re-erected—stands behind this gate. Additionally, another *Gejō-ishi* (dated March 1794) is located at the Shiramine Observatory Plaza.
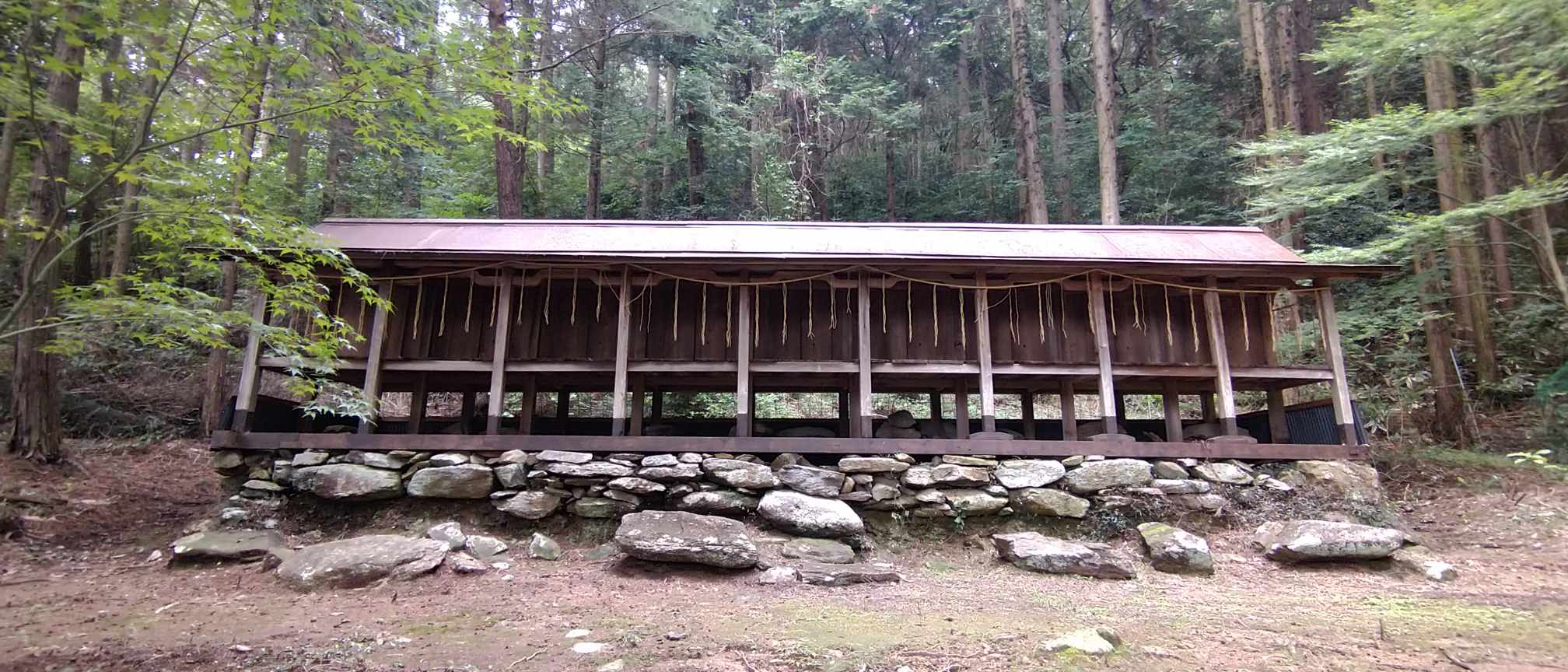
  Kusya Myōjin Shrine
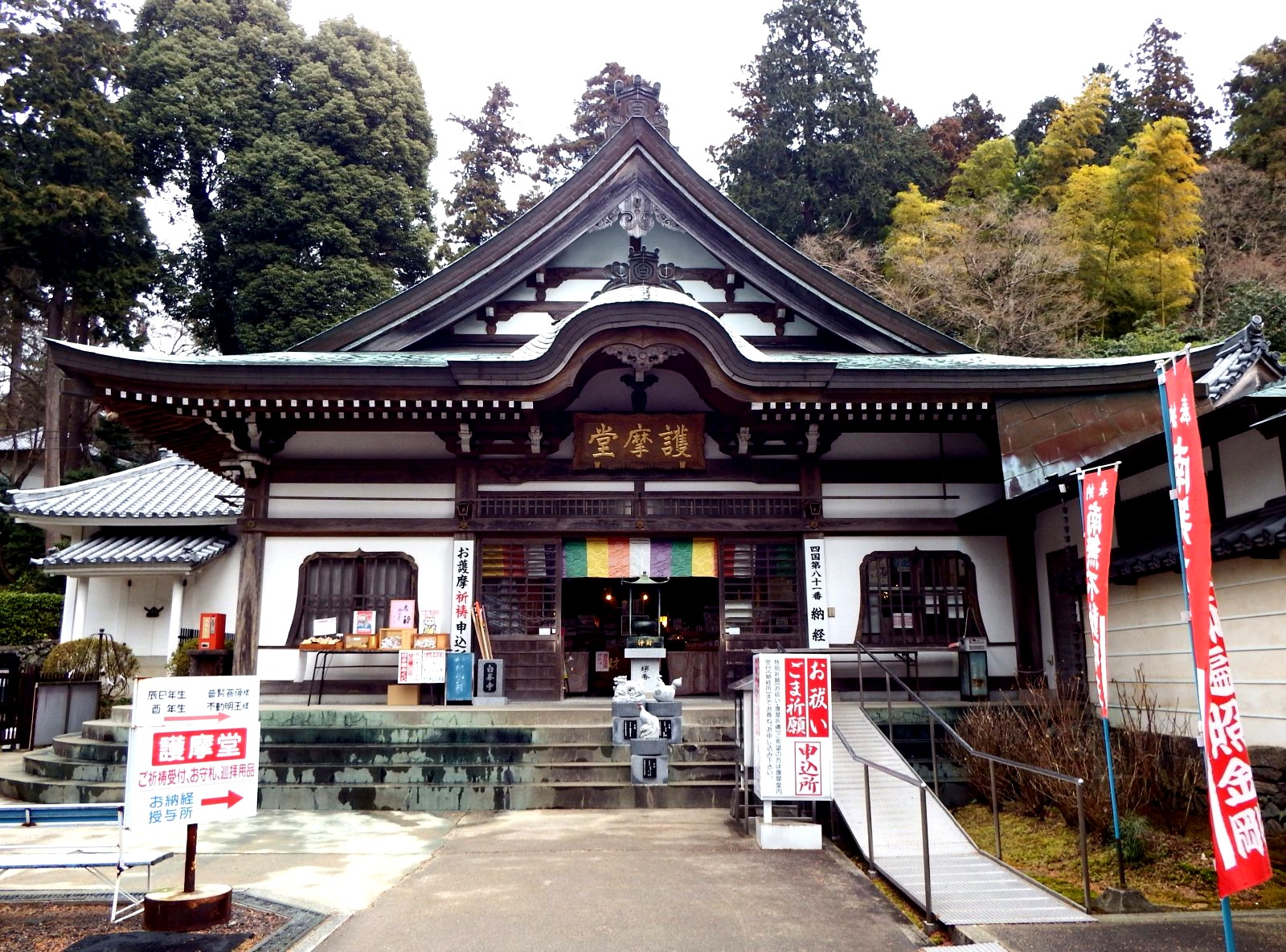
  Goma Hall
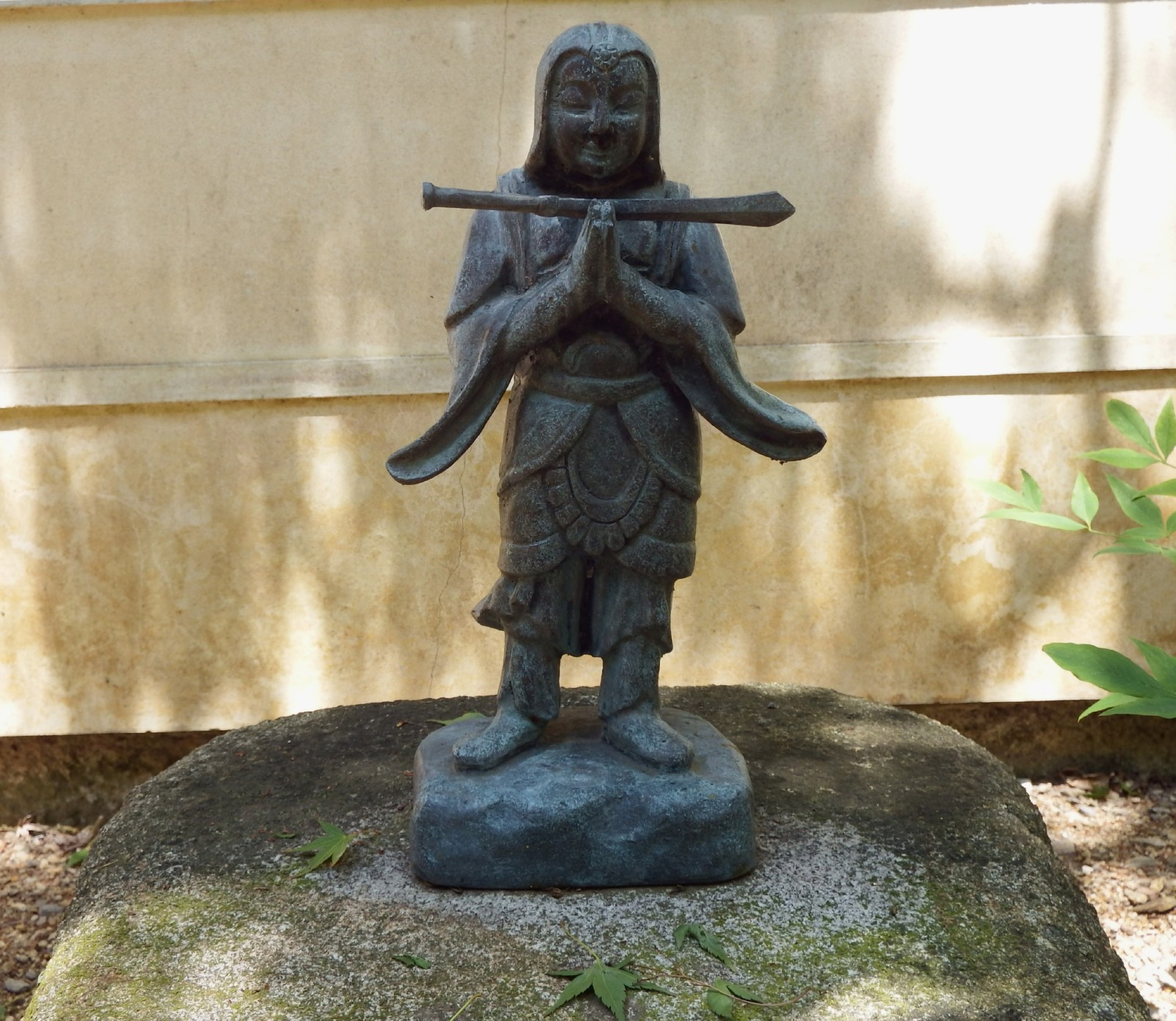
  Statue of Idaten
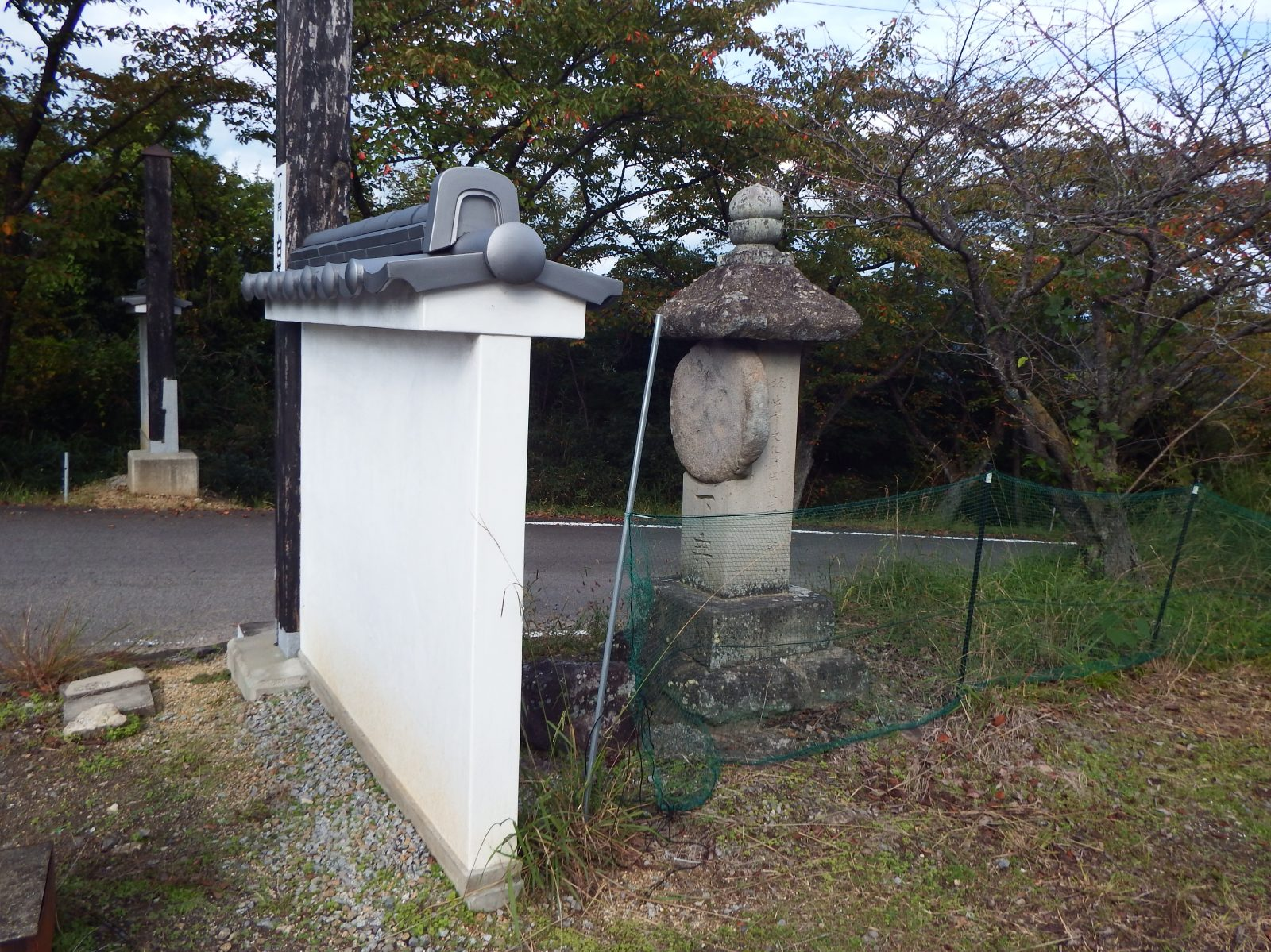
  First Gate and Dismounting Stone
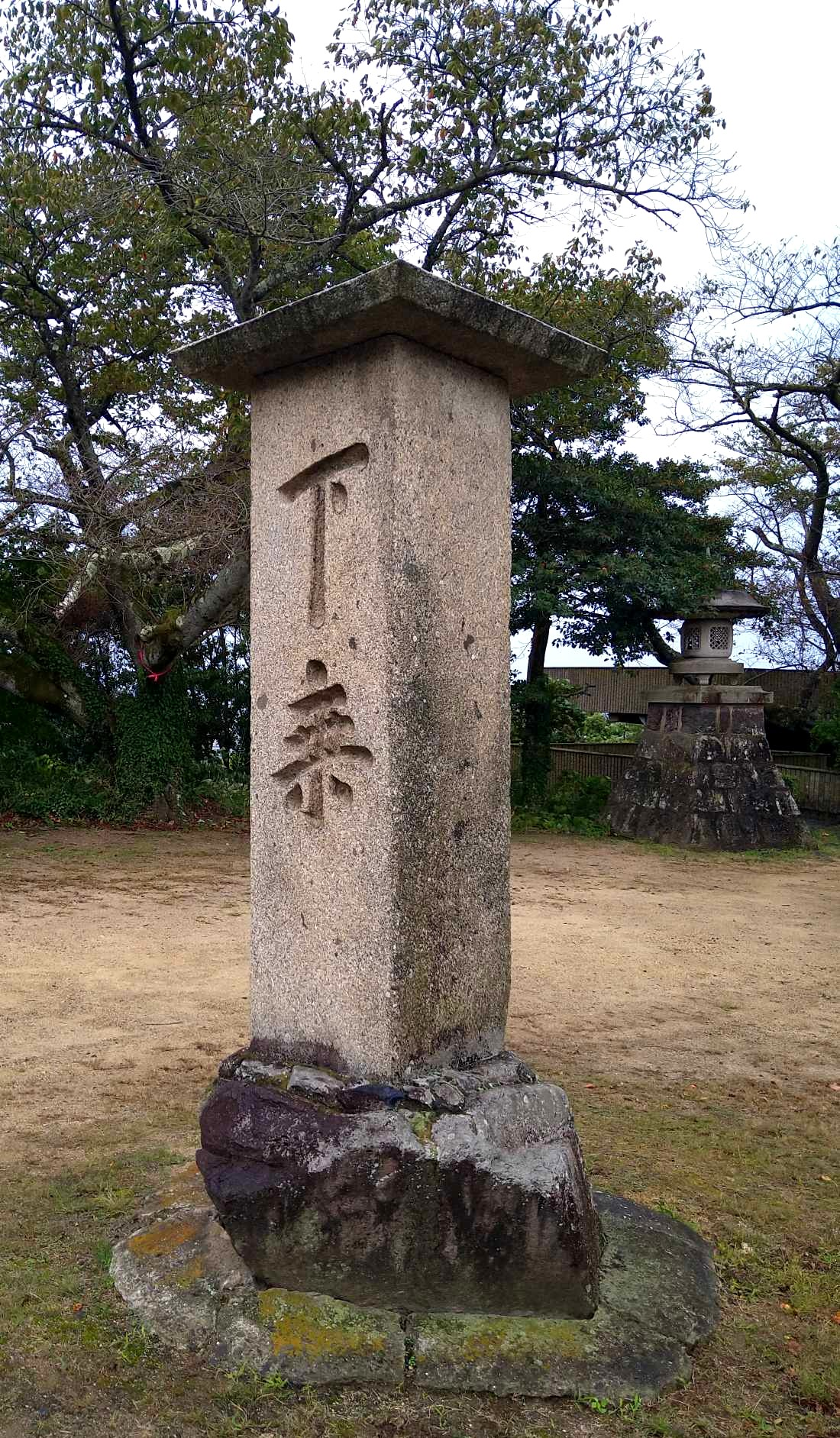
  Dismounting Stone at the Shiramine Observatory

=== Tonshōji-den ===
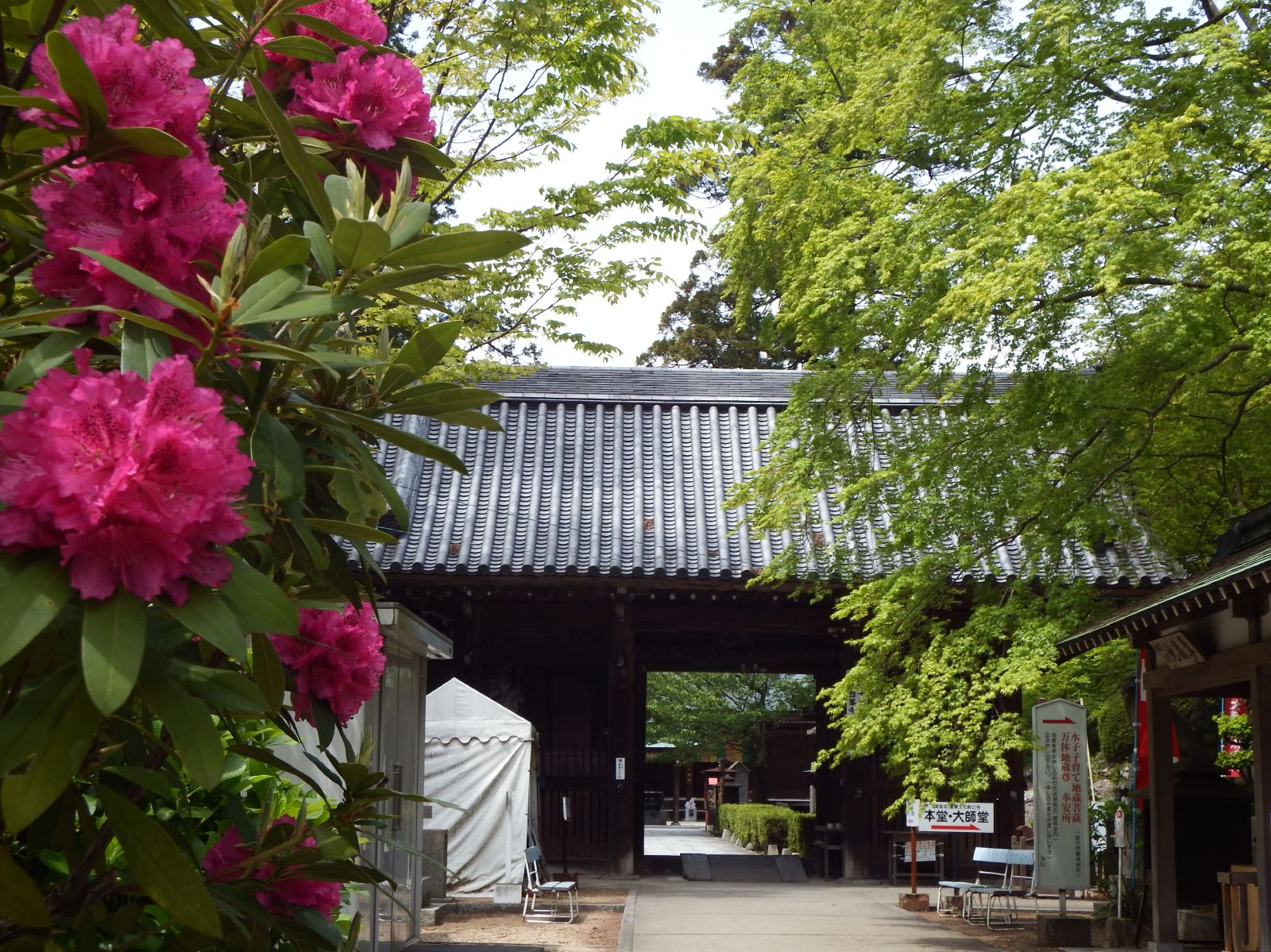
Chokugaku-mon Gate (Important Cultural Property)

Guardian Figures of the Chokugaku-mon Gate

- Chokugaku-mon Gate [Important Cultural Property]: Constructed in Enpō 8 (1680). The chokugaku (imperial plaque)—designated an Important Cultural Property—is housed in the Treasure Hall, while a replica hangs on the gate itself. The gate is guarded by warrior statues: Minamoto no Tameyoshi (Note: A military commander who sided with Emperor Sutoku during the Hōgen Rebellion (1096–1156)) on the left, and Minamoto no Tametomo (Note: The eighth son of Minamoto no Tameyoshi (1139–1170?)) on the right. However, the doors are typically kept closed, so these statues are not visible to the public. Note that the current statues are newly crafted replacements donated to the temple; the original statues were transferred to Kotohira-gū Shrine and Shiramine Shrine in Meiji 31 (1898). Although generally closed to the public, the gate is opened for viewing during the Shushō-e (New Year's Service), the New Year's Grand Goma Fire Ritual, and the Dai-Hannya Okaji (Great Prajna Consecration) Ritual.
- Note: A wheelchair ramp is available.
- Tonshōji-den: Worship Hall and Three Inner Sanctuary Buildings [Important Cultural Properties]: Constructed in Enpō 8 (1680). Within the inner sanctuary of the Tonshōji-den—the mausoleum of Emperor Sutoku—stand three shrines. Emperor Sutoku is enshrined in the center; to the left (as viewed from the front) is enshrined the guardian deity, Shiramine Daigongen Sagamibō; and to the right is enshrined his personal devotional image, the Eleven-faced Kannon (Juichimen Kannon Bosatsu). The Hall of Worship houses an image of Monju Bosatsu (Manjushri). On September 21 and 28, 2014, a special public unveiling of the sanctuary took place—the first in 50 years—allowing visitors to view the image of Emperor Sutoku.

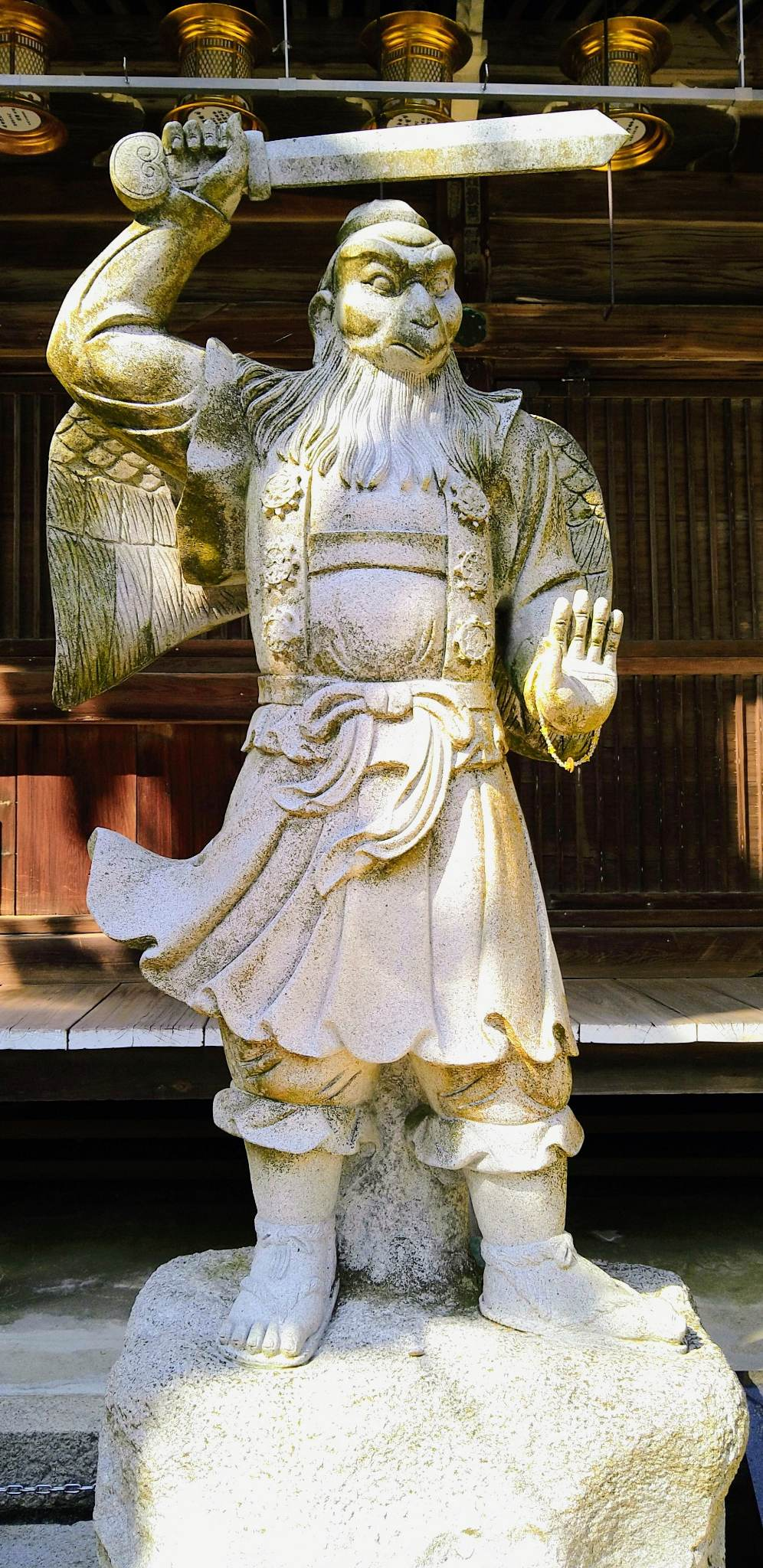
Shiramine Daigongen

- Shiramine Daigongen Sagamibō (Maebotoke / Proxy Image): The principal deity (Honzon) is a Hibutsu (secret Buddha) and is not displayed to the public. Sagamibō is one of Japan's "Eight Great Tengu" and one of the "Three Tengu of Sanuki" (the others being Chūjōbō of Yakuri-ji Temple and Kongōbō of Kotohira-gū Shrine). Originally the mountain deity of Mt. Shiramine, the name "Sagamibō" is believed to derive from Sagami Ajari Shōson—a figure who appears in The Tale of Hōgen (Hōgen Monogatari) and who sided with the Retired Emperor Sutoku. Additionally, a temple legend recounts that he was a great ascetic (Daigyōja) who arrived from Mt. Ōyama in Sagami Province; leading the mountain ascetics (Yamabushi) of this temple, he came to be revered as a Daigongen (Great Avatar), serving as the temple's guardian deity and the divine protector of the Retired Emperor Sutoku.
- Emperor Sutoku Shiramine Mausoleum Distant Worship Site (Yōhaijo): Located in the rear-left section of the Hall of Worship. Situated within the fence directly in front is a stone monument inscribed with a *waka* poem by the Retired Emperor: "Though the path of the plover leads back to the Capital, my body remains here in Matsuyama—where I do naught but weep." To the left of the monument stands a "Tonshōji-style" stone lantern.
- Stone Seated Statue of Priest Saigyō: This statue is enshrined atop a stone said to be the very one upon which Saigyō sat when he paid homage to Emperor Sutoku. Situated nearby is a stone monument inscribed with a poem by Saigyō: "Alas, my Lord—though once your palace floors were paved with gems, of what avail are such things now that you have met this fate?" (Original text: Yoshi ya kimi, mukashi no tama no yuka to te mo, kakaran nochi wa nani ka wa sen).
- Ofuda-ba (Talisman Office): A facility that serves as both a distribution point for amulets and a reception desk for prayer requests; it is open during events such as the Shushō-e (New Year's Prayer Service) and temple festival days. A hanging scroll depicting a seated image of Kōbō Daishi is displayed here as the principal object of worship.

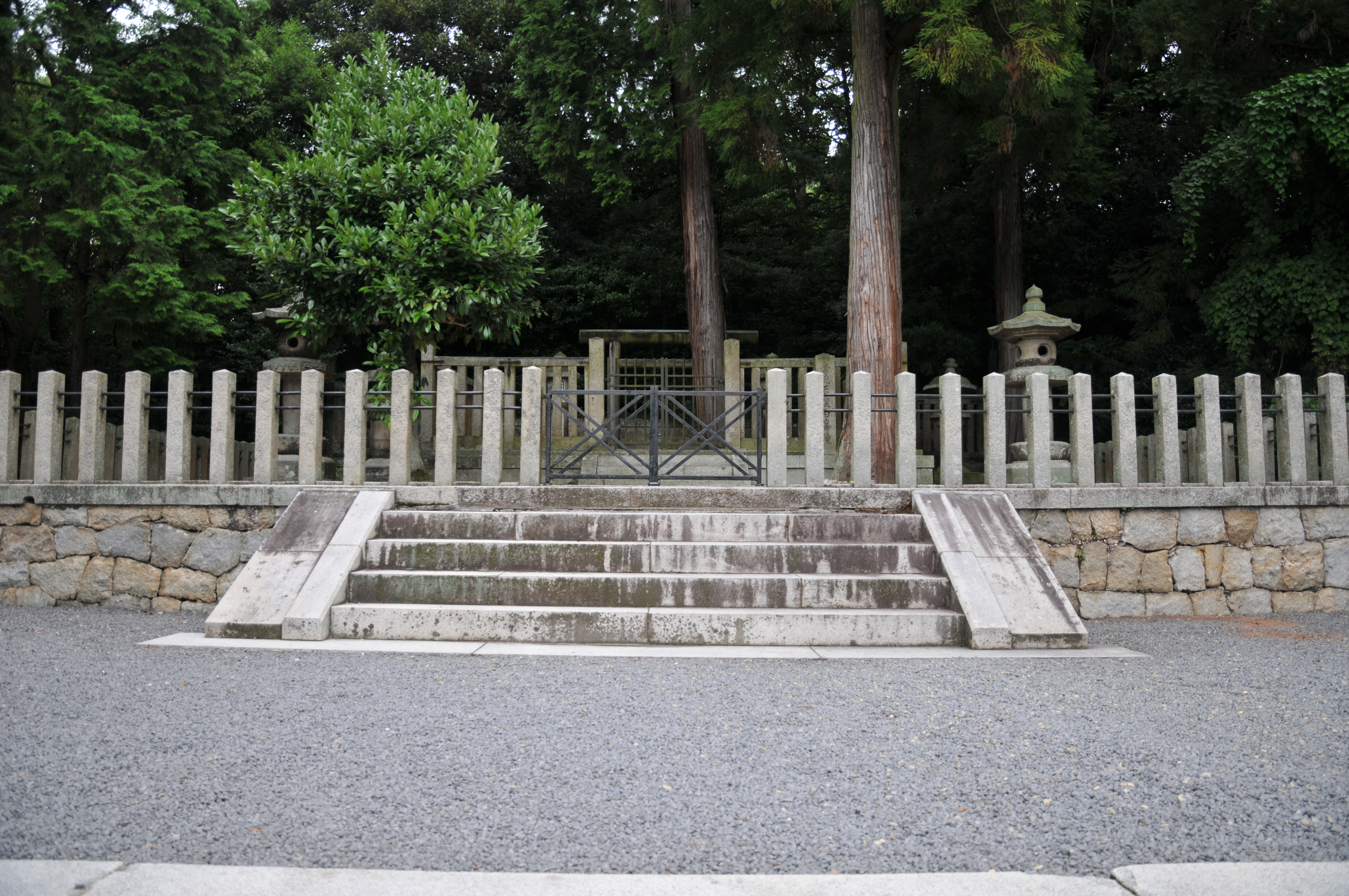
Emperor Sutoku's Shiramine Imperial Mausoleum

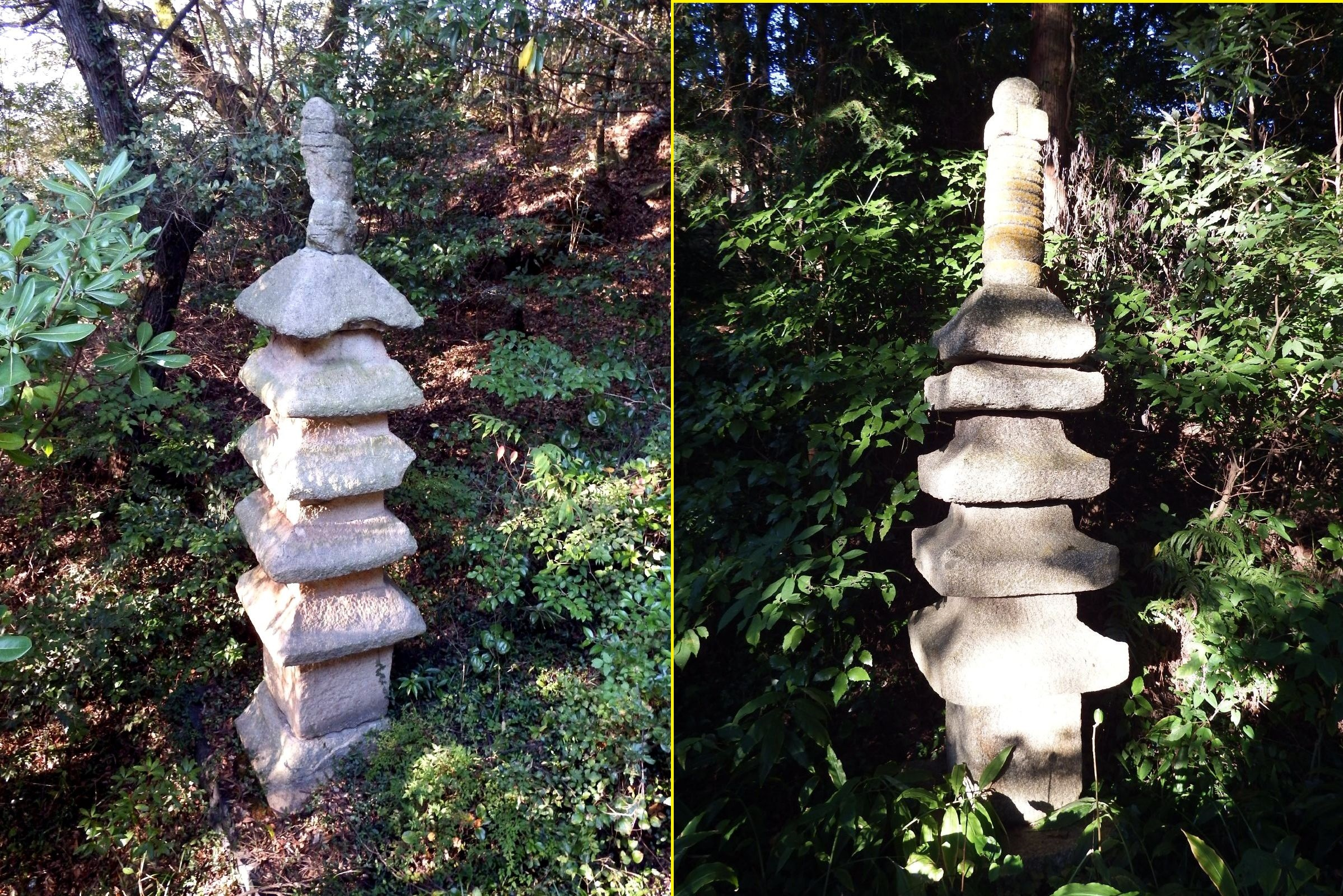
Memorial Stupas for Minamoto no Tametomo and Minamoto no Tameyoshi at Shiramine Imperial Mausoleum

- Emperor Sutoku's Shiramine Imperial Mausoleum (Shiramine no Misasagi): Located approximately 100 meters past the rear entrance—situated behind the Tamabumi no Ki (Letter-Tree)—within the precincts of Shiramine-ji Temple, and about 20 meters behind the Tonshōji-den Hall. This is the imperial mausoleum of the 75th Emperor, Sutoku; the tomb takes the form of a square mound. (Note: Kamata Kyosaikai Local Museum, 1978, loc: § Emperor Sutoku's Shiramine Imperial Mausoleum) Within the worship area, the pair of stone lanterns positioned at the front were dedicated by Matsudaira Yoriyasu, while the pair at the rear were dedicated by Matsudaira Yorishige. Additionally, memorial stupas (kuyōtō) stand on the lower terrace of the worship area: one for Minamoto no Tameyoshi (made of granite) on the right, and one for Minamoto no Tametomo (made of tuff) on the left. (Note: Shiramine-ji Temple, 2013, loc: § Rites for the Retired Emperor and Shiramine Imperial Mausoleum) Regardless of the day of the week, the Shōshin-sai (Ceremony of the Auspicious Day)—commemorating the death anniversary of Retired Emperor Sutoku—is solemnly conducted every year on September 21st, beginning at 9:00 AM. Along the approach path stands a stone thirteen-story pagoda; further back, past the parking area, are a small Inari shrine and a statue of the Ascetic Kobo Daishi. Upon passing through the main mountain gate, the Onari-mon (Lord's Gate) appears to the right, followed by the Chokushi-mon (Imperial Envoy Gate); situated behind these are the Guest Hall and the Head Priest's Residence. To the left lie the Tea House and the purification pavilion. Continuing straight ahead, the Goma-do (Fire Ritual Hall) comes into view directly in front, housing the Sutra Reception Office within. If one proceeds to the left with the Goma-do still in view, a small shrine dedicated to Benzaiten, a Mizuko Jizo (guardian deity of departed children), and a purification pavilion appear to the right; directly ahead stands the Chokugaku-mon (Imperial Plaque Gate), behind which lies the Tonshoji-den Hall. To the right, a long flight of stone steps can be seen ascending steeply into the distance. Climbing these steps, one encounters the Yakushi-do (Hall of the Medicine Buddha) on the left and the Belfry on the right; continuing further, the Gyosha-do (Ascetics' Hall) is on the left and the Eko-do (Memorial Hall) on the right. After ascending a total of 99 stone steps, the Main Hall stands directly ahead at the very top. To the right of the Main Hall are the *Daishi-do* (Hall of Kobo Daishi), a shrine dedicated to the Nine Deities (*Kyusha Myojin*), a Jizo shrine, and a shrine to the Dragon King Zennyo; to the left stand a stone *Yugi-to* pagoda and the *Amida-do* (Hall of Amida Buddha).
- Temple Lodging (Shukubo): Available (Accommodation is limited to groups of 16 or more; maximum capacity: 80 guests). *Note: Currently closed due to the COVID-19 pandemic.*
- Admission Fee: 200 yen
- Parking: Free (Front Gate Lot: approx. 30 cars; Stone Pagoda Lot: approx. 10 cars; 2nd Lot: approx. 80 cars; 3rd Lot: approx. 80 cars; Total capacity: 200 cars).

== Cultural Properties ==
=== Important Cultural Properties ===
- Stone Thirteen-Story Pagodas — 2 structures: Traditionally said to have been erected by Minamoto no Yoritomo to pray for the repose of Emperor Sutoku. The East Pagoda is made of granite, stands 5.95 m in total height, and was constructed in the first year of the Koan era (1278); the West Pagoda is made of tuffaceous breccia, stands 5.62 m in total height, and was constructed in the fourth year of the Genko era (1324). Designated on September 17, 1954.
- Wooden Imperial Plaque for Tonsho-ji Temple: Height 139 cm, Width 115 cm; created during the Muromachi period; features the calligraphy of Emperor Go-Komatsu; designated on March 27, 1901.
- Shiramine-ji Temple — 9 Structures (Buildings): Designated on July 31, 2017.
  - Main Hall (Attached: Zushi [Miniature Shrine])
  - Daishi Hall (Attached: Zushi, 1 Ridge Tag)
  - Amida Hall
  - Gyōjadō (Annex: 1 ridge tag)
  - Yakushidō
  - Tonshōjiden (Hall of Retired Emperor Sutoku; Honjidō; Shiramine Gongendō; Haiden) (Annex: 7 ridge tags) — Built in 1680 (Enpō 8)
  - Chokugakumon (Imperial Plaque Gate)
  - Kyakuden (Guest Hall) (Annex: 1 ridge tag)
  - Onarimon (Imperial Visit Gate) (Annex: 3 ridge tags)
    - (Annexed Designation) Chokushimon (Imperial Messenger Gate), Nanatōmon (Seven-Roof Gate)
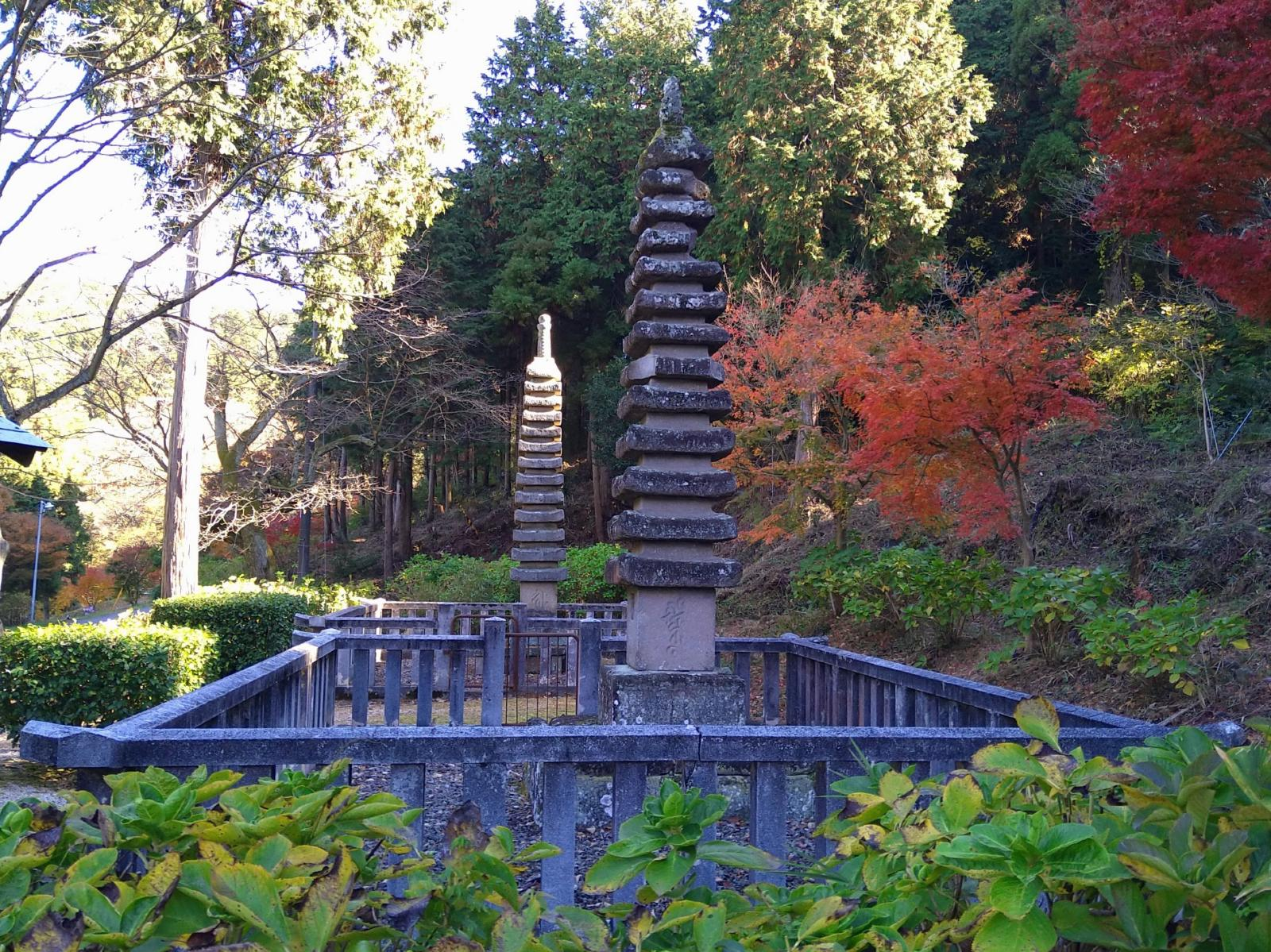
Stone Thirteen-Story Pagoda

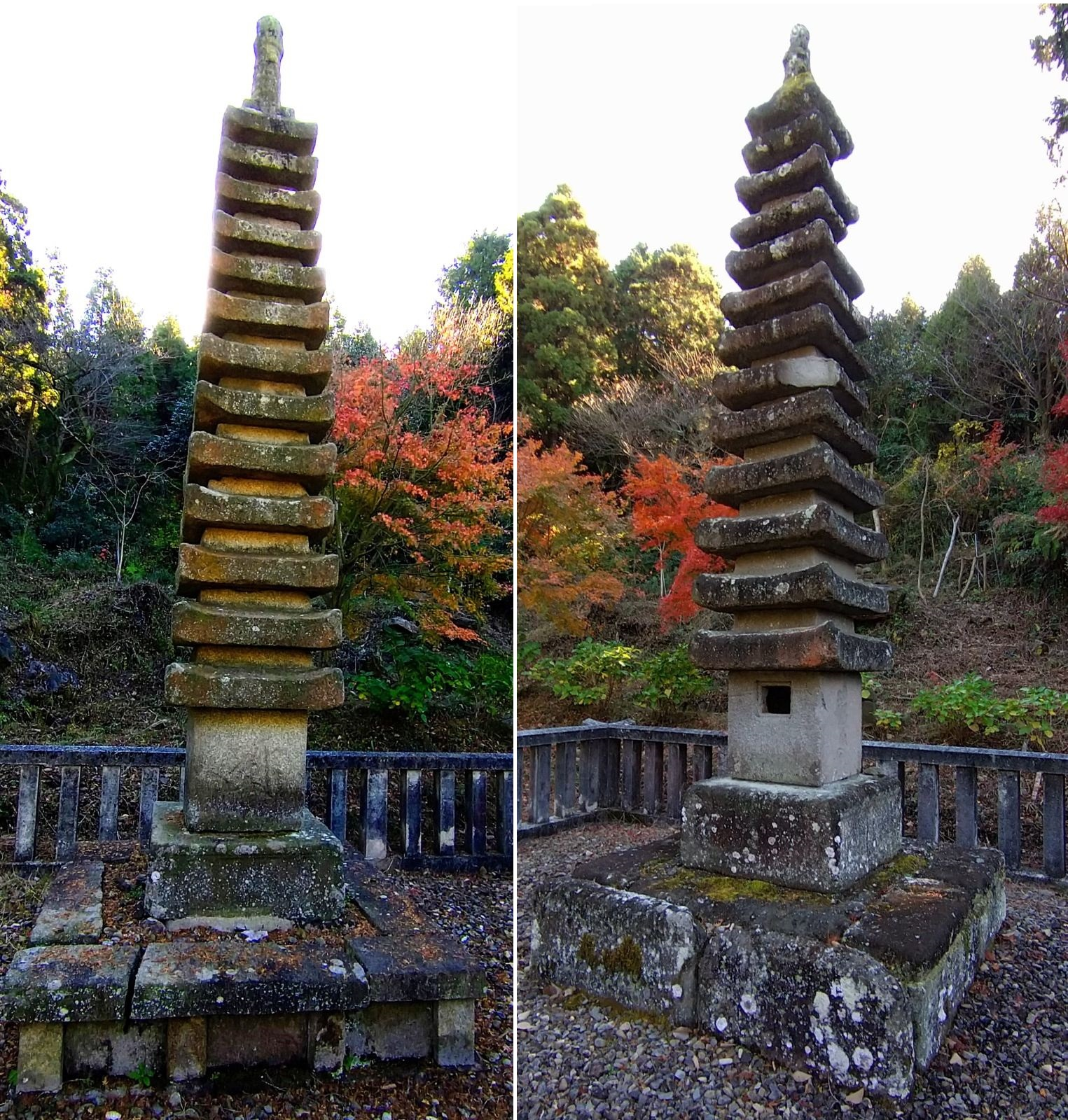
The East and West Pagodas

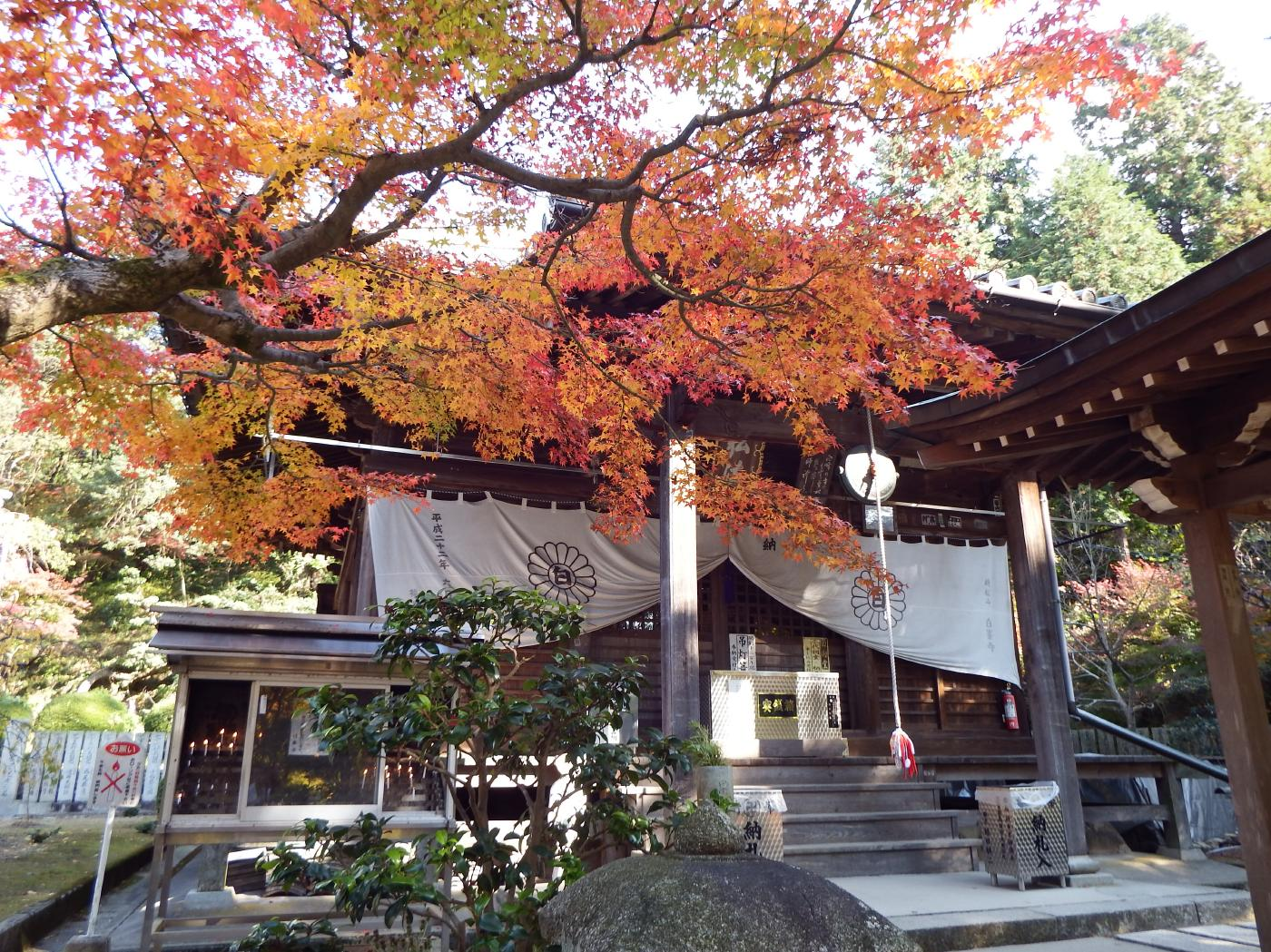
Daishidō (Founder's Hall)

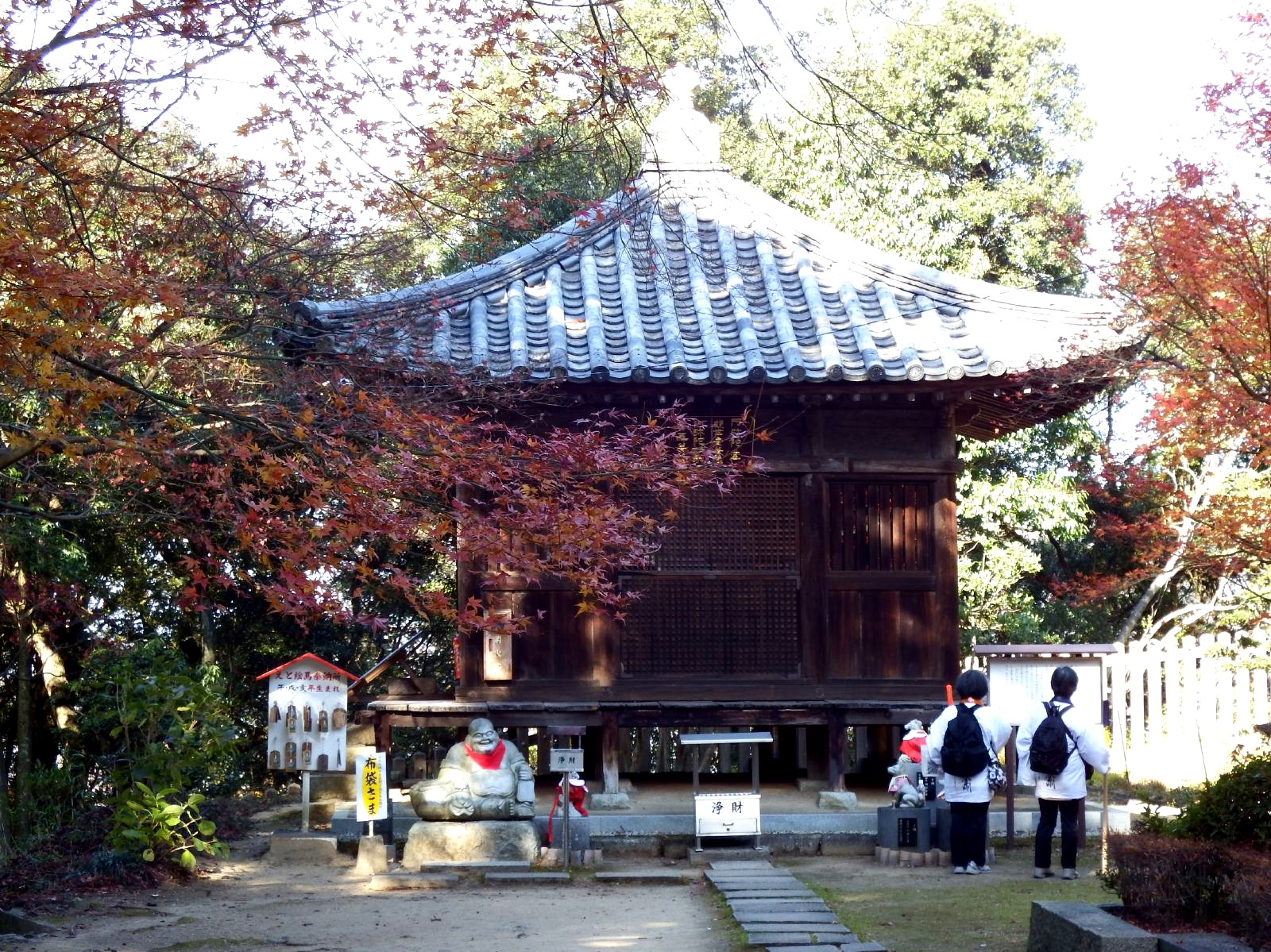
Amidadō (Amida Hall)

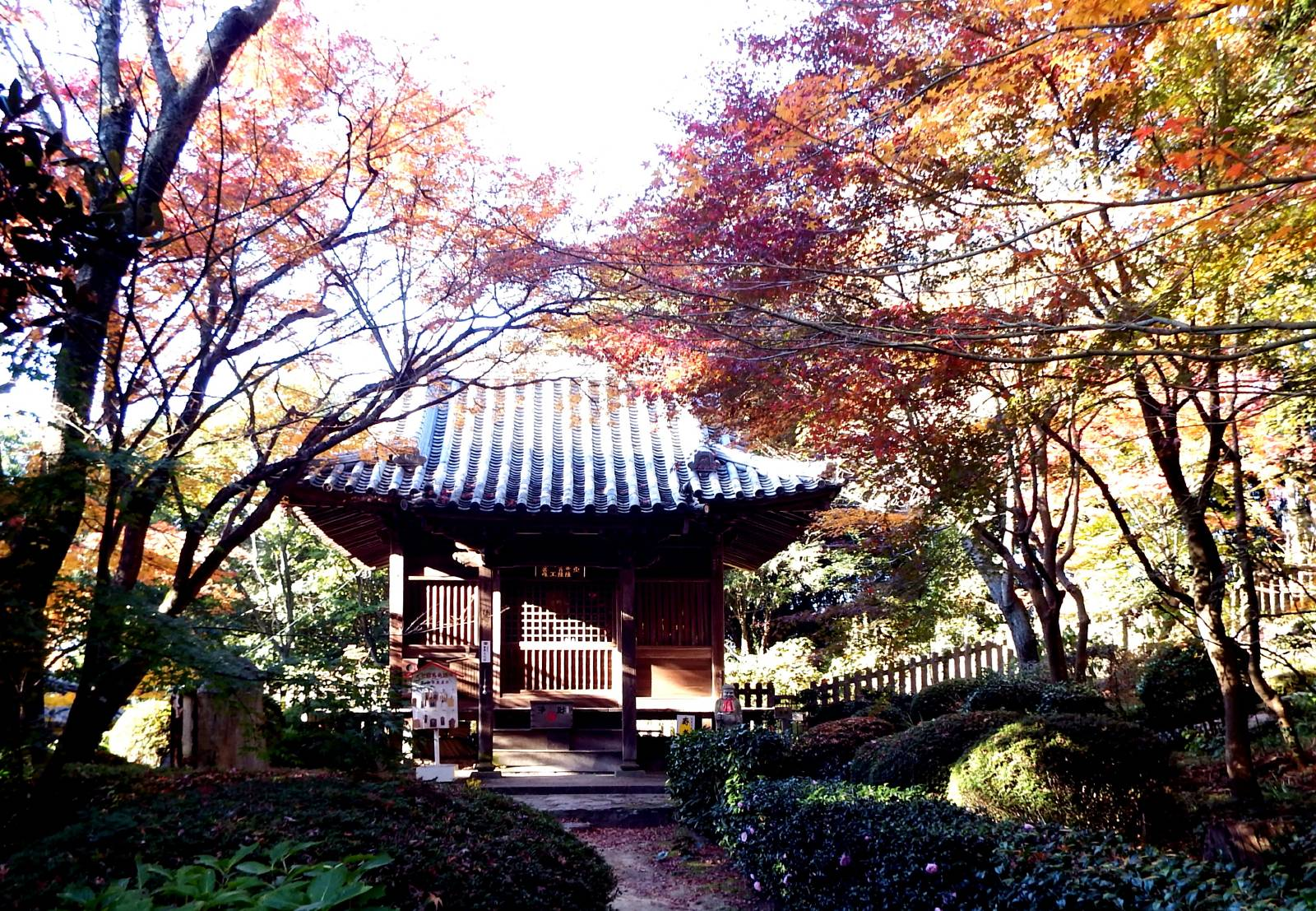
Gyōjadō

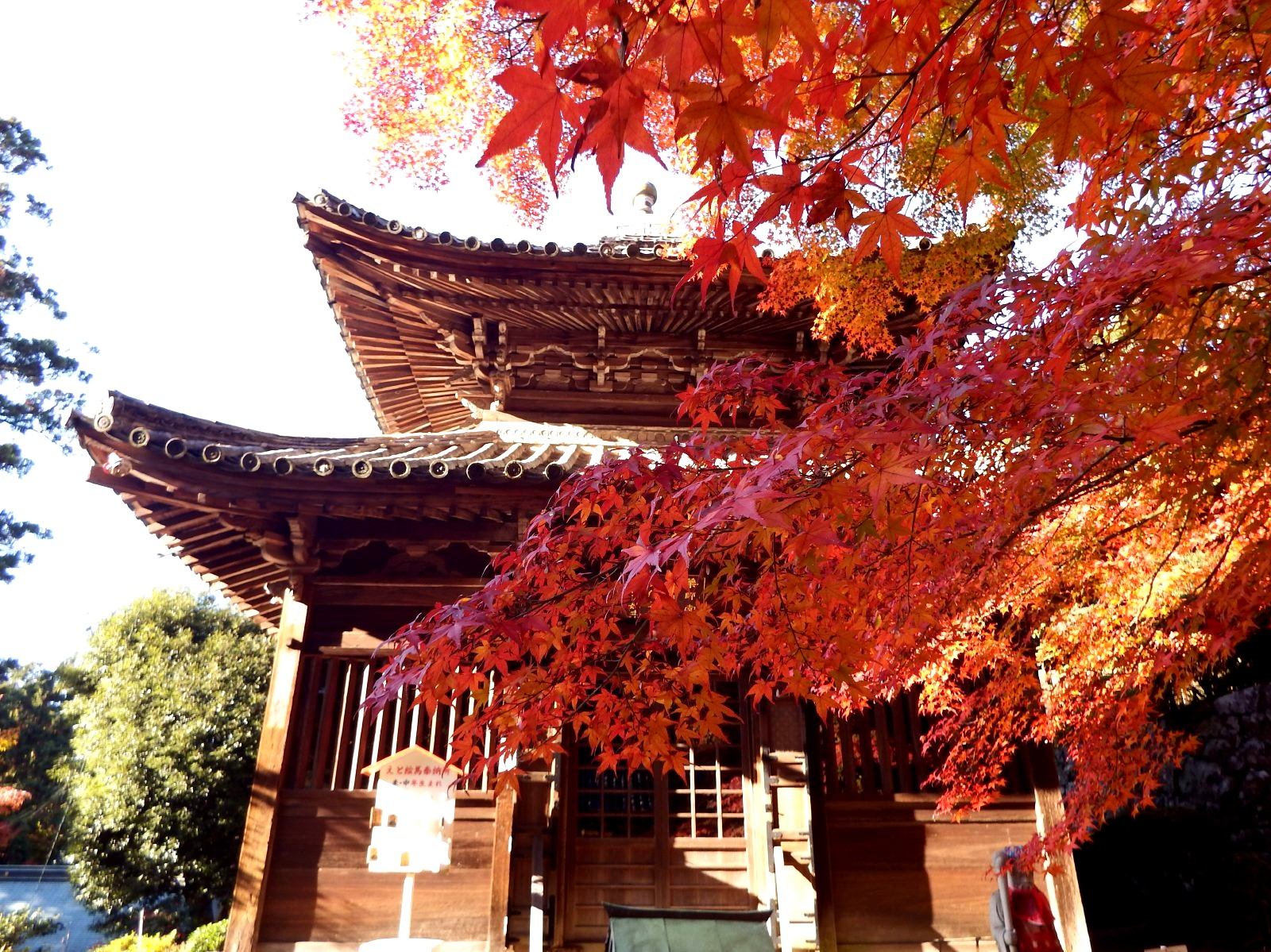
Yakushidō

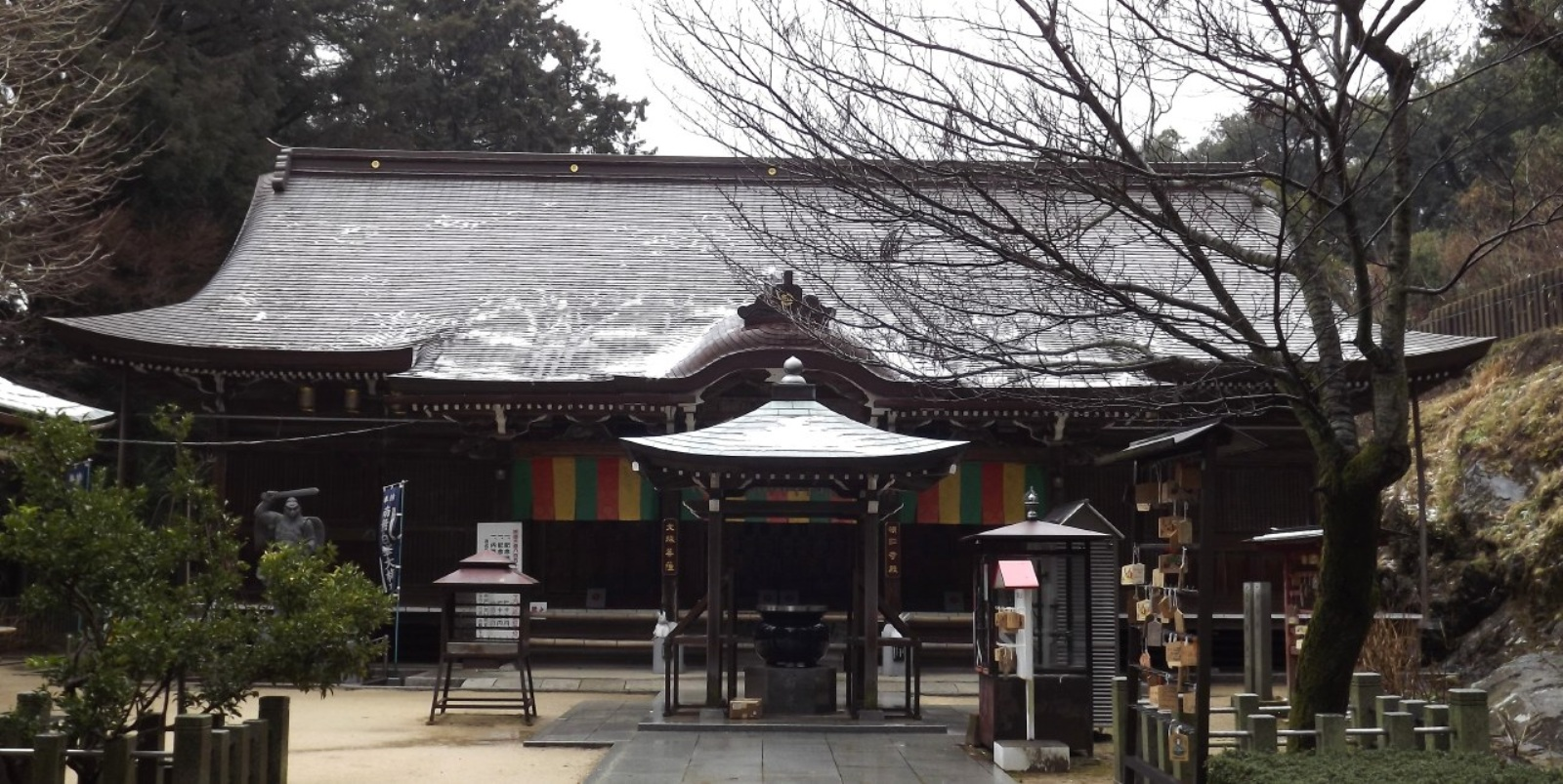
Tonshōjiden Haiden (Worship Hall)

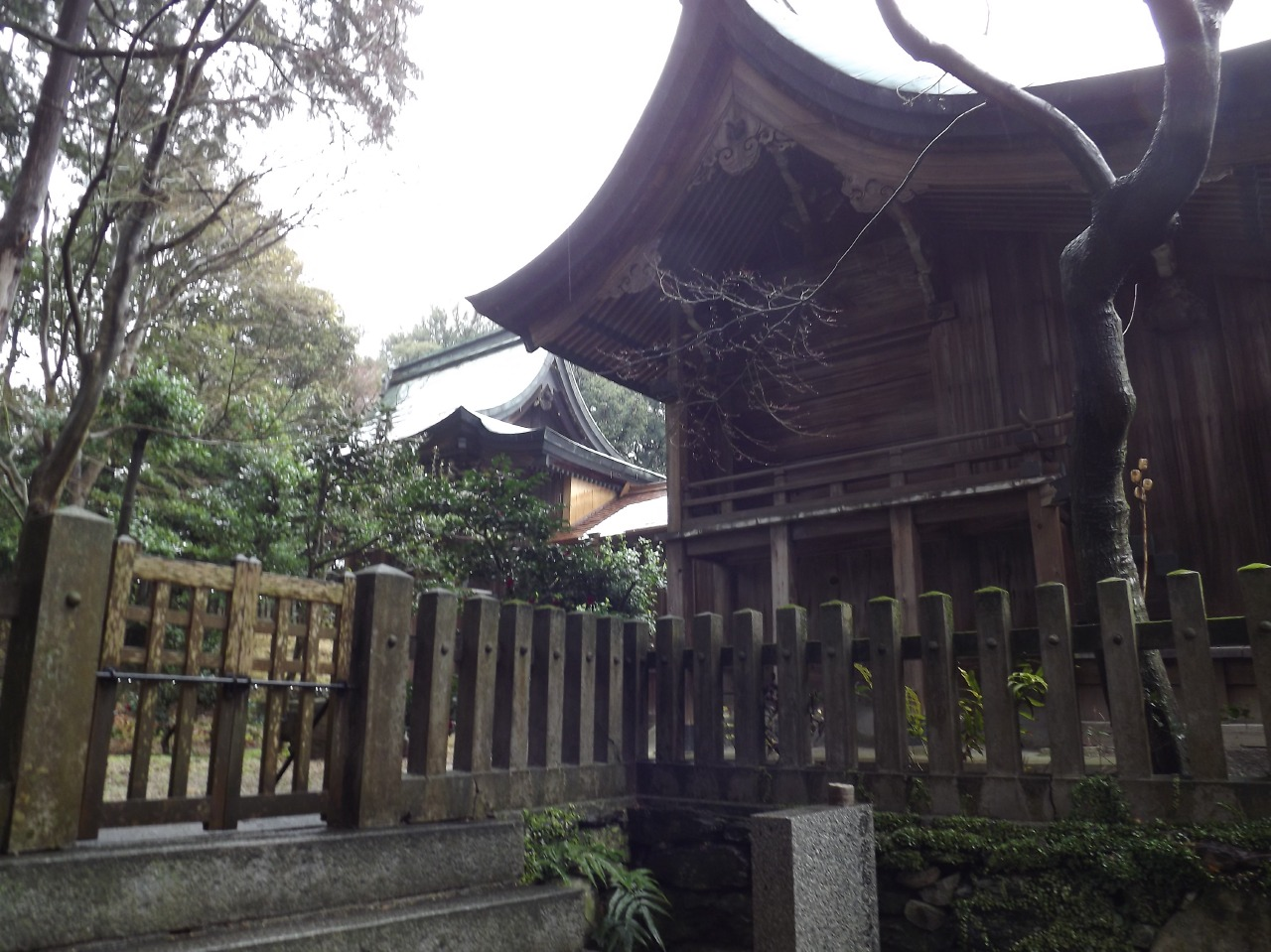
Tonshōjiden Okuden (Inner Sanctuary)

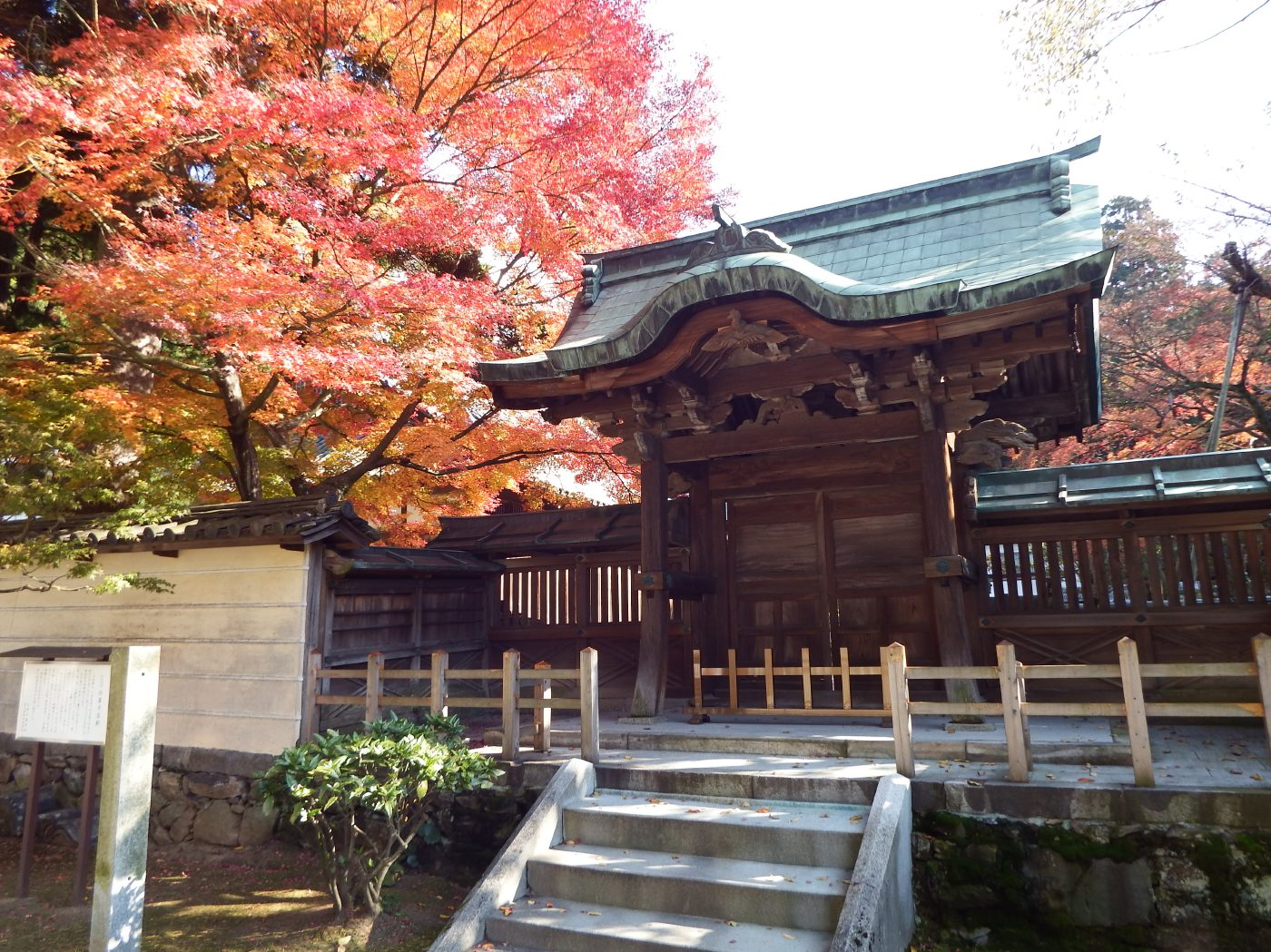
Onarimon Gate

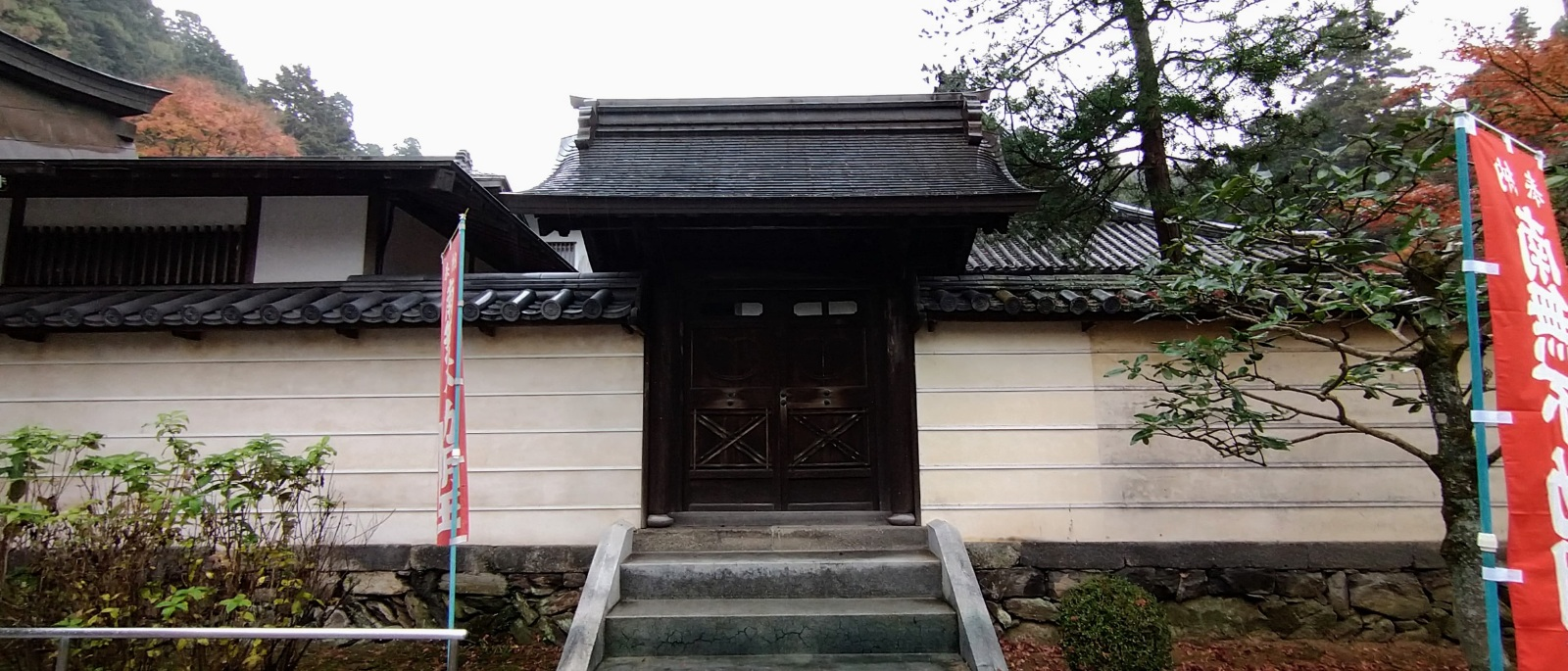
Chokushimon Gate

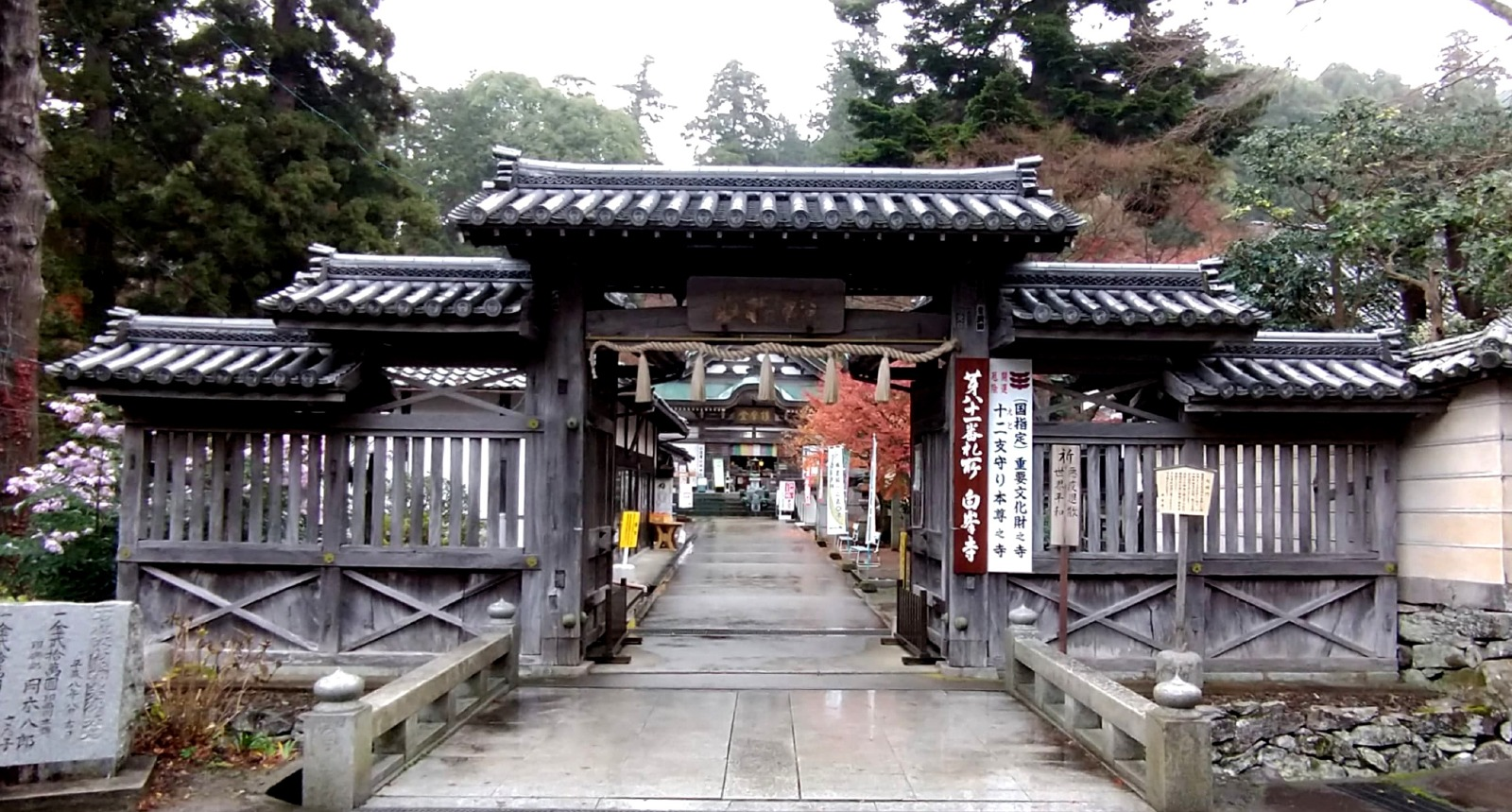
Shichitomemon Gate

Historic Sites

- Sanuki Pilgrimage Route: Negoroji Path — For details, please refer to Negoroji.

=== Prefecturally Designated Tangible Cultural Properties ===
- Wooden Standing Statue of Kichijōten: Carved from a single block of Japanese nutmeg wood (kaya), including the pedestal; statue height is 44 cm, pedestal height is 6 cm; created during the Heian period; designated on July 31, 1975.
- Stone Kasatōba (Manirin-tō): Made of tuff breccia; erected on February 18, Gen'ō 3 (1321), by the esoteric Buddhist monk Kongō Busshi Sōmyō; located beside the "Gejō" (Dismount) stone, approximately 0.5 km east of the temple grounds along the pilgrimage route; designated on June 6, 1961.
- Five-Story Pagoda: Made of granite; height is 2.15 m; located in the back garden of the Guest Hall; not open to the public. It is similar in style to the memorial stupa for Minamoto no Tameyoshi located at Shiramine-ryō; created during the Kamakura period; designated on April 9, 1964.
- Stone Lantern: Hexagonal in shape, made of granite; total height is 1.9 m; stands to the left of the Worship Hall (Haiden) at the Tonshōji-den. Created during the Kamakura period; designated on June 6, 1961.

=== Sakaide City Designated Tangible Cultural Properties ===
- Deed of Donation by Ikoma Chikanori and Kazumasa (1 scroll); Deed of Donation by Sengoku Hidehisa (1 scroll); Letters by Ikoma Takatoshi and Todo Takatora (1 scroll): Created during the Azuchi-Momoyama period; designated on February 21, 1958.
- Kongōkai Mandala (Diamond Realm Mandala) and Taizōkai Mandala (Womb Realm Mandala): Created between the Heian and Kamakura periods; designated on November 3, 1961.
- Painting of the Eleven-faced, Thousand-armed Kannon: Created during the Kamakura period; designated on November 3, 1961.
- Standing Statue of the Eleven-faced Kannon: Created during the Kamakura period; designated on January 10, 1967.
- Seated Statue of Fudō Myōō (Acala): Created during the Kamakura period; designated on January 10, 1967.
- Myōhō Renge Kyō (Lotus Sutra) on Indigo Paper with Gold Ink: Created during the Heian period; designated on November 3, 1979.

=== Kagawa Prefecture's Preserved Trees ===
- Fir Tree at Shiramine-ji Temple: Tree height 35m; trunk circumference at breast height 3.5m; designated on February 27, 1979.
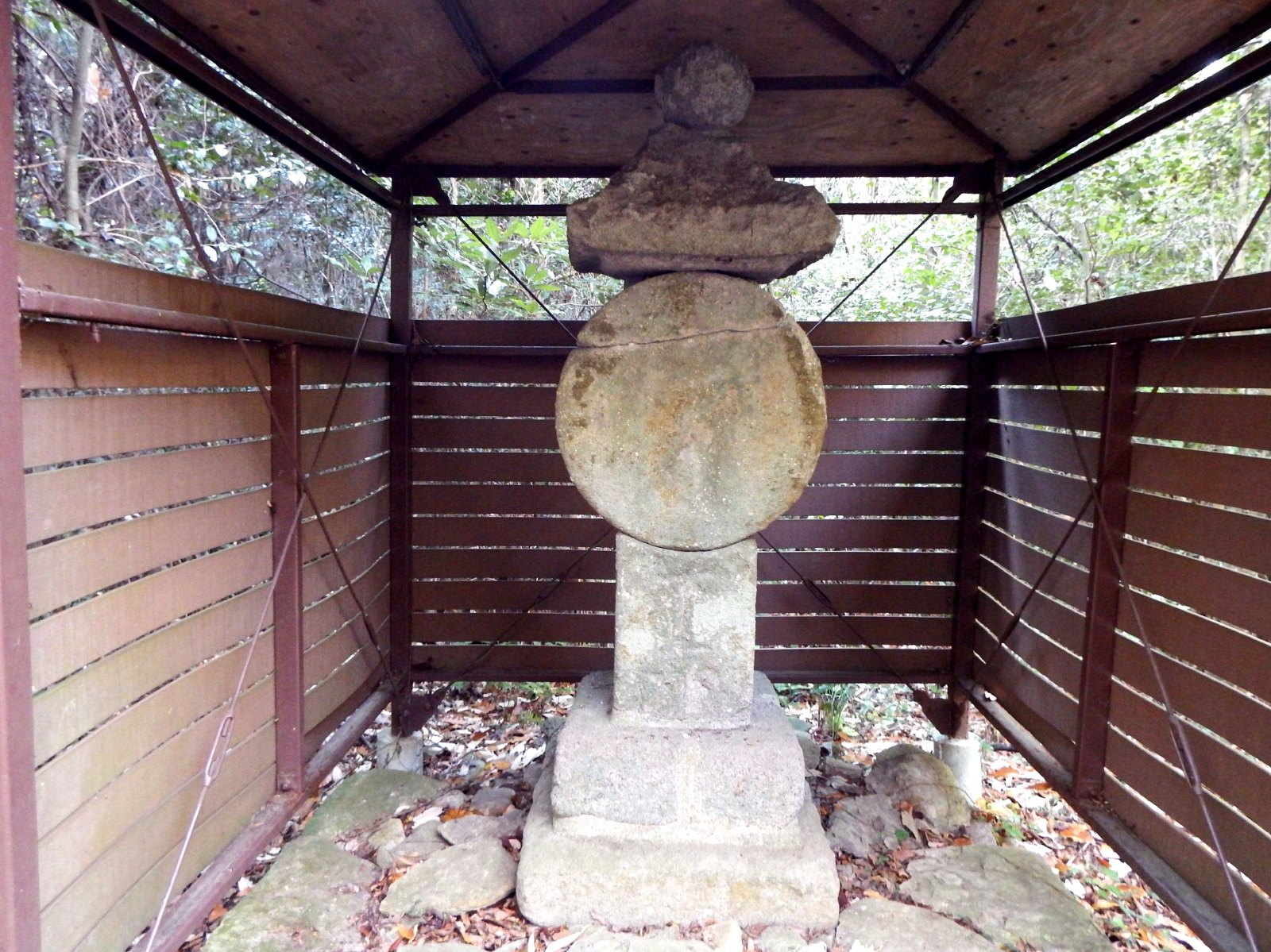
Stone Kasatōba (Umbrella Stupa)

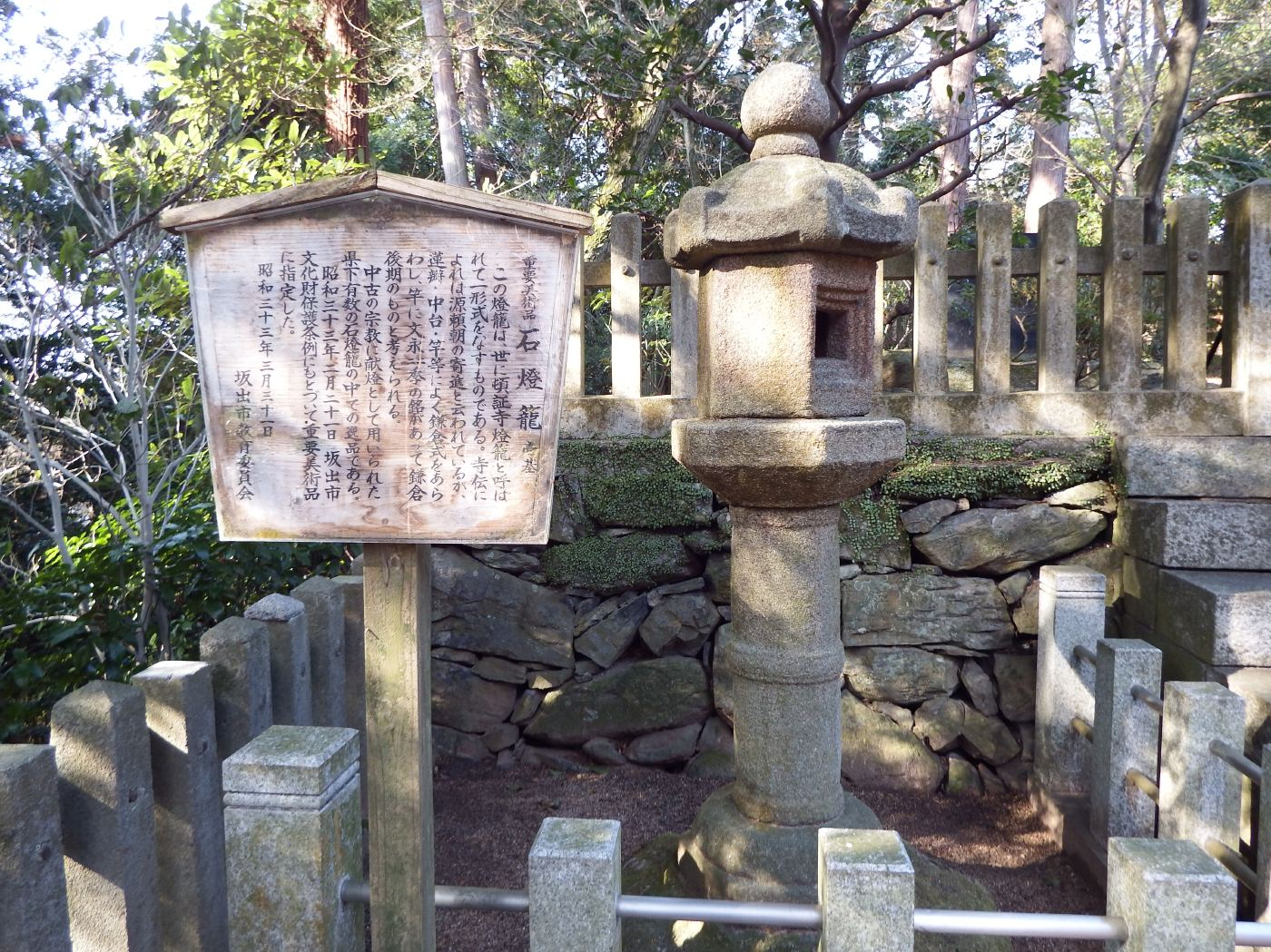
Stone Lantern

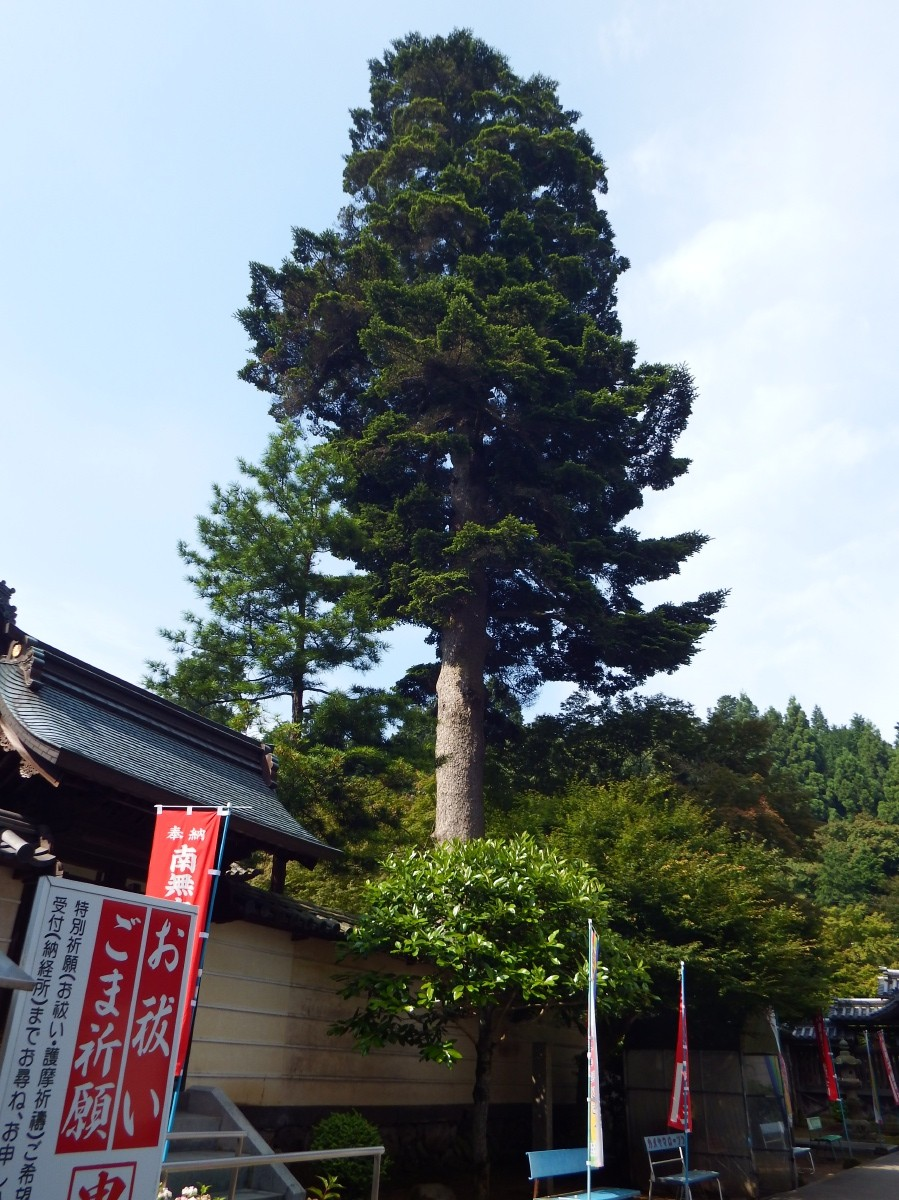
Fir Tree (Kagawa Prefecture's Preserved Tree)

== Annual Events ==
- January 1–3: New Year's Prayer Service (Shusho-e) — Tonshojiden Hall / Goma Hall
- Last Sunday of January: Grand New Year's Goma Fire Ritual (Good Fortune Fire-Walking Ceremony) — In front of Tonshojiden Hall; Great Prajna Sutra Recitation Ceremony — Tonshojiden Hall
- February 3: Star Festival (Setsubun) — Goma Hall
- Throughout March: Jusan-mairi (Coming-of-Age Pilgrimage for 13-Year-Olds) — Goma Hall
- Last Sunday of April: Perpetual Earth-Blessing *Higan* Service — Goma Hall
- Sunday closest to July 10: Sennichi-e (Festival Day for the Principal Deity, the Thousand-Armed Kannon) — Main Hall
- September 21: Emperor Sutoku's Memorial Festival — Shiramine Imperial Mausoleum
- Throughout November: Shichi-Go-San (Children's Festival) Pilgrimage — Goma Hall
- Second Sunday of November: Great Prajna Blessing Ceremony — Tonshojiden Hall
- December 22: Star Festival (Winter Solstice) — Goma Hall (*Note: Held on the 21st in leap years*)
- New Year's Eve: Joya no Kane (Ringing of the New Year's Bell) — Bell Tower (*Note: Clay bells featuring the new year's zodiac animal are distributed to the first arrivals*)
- The 28th of every month (excluding January and April): Monthly Goma Prayer and Memorial Service (Festival Day for Fudo Myo-o) — Goma Hall

== Access ==
=== Rail ===
- Shikoku Railway Company (JR Shikoku) Yosan Line — Kamogawa Station (9.9 km)
- Shikoku Railway Company (JR Shikoku) Yosan Line — Sakaide Station (12 km)

=== Road ===
- Local Road: Kagawa Prefectural Road 180 (Kamogawa Station–Goshikidai Line) — Shiramine Park Center (0.4 km)
- Expressway: Takamatsu Expressway / Seto-Chuo Expressway — Sakaide IC (11.9 km)
- Expressway: Takamatsu Expressway — Takamatsu-Danshi IC (18 km)

== Neighboring Temples ==
=== Shikoku Pilgrimage ===
Pilgrimage Route (Walking): 80 Sanuki Kokubun-ji --(6.5 km)-- 81 Shiramine-ji --(5.0 km)-- 82 Negoro-ji
*Note: There are multiple routes for the pilgrimage path; the distances listed above are based on the standard route.
Road Route (Vehicle): 80 Sanuki Kokubun-ji --(13 km)-- 81 Shiramine-ji --(8.0 km)-- 82 Negoro-ji

== Sacred Sites Surrounding the Temple ==
=== The Pilgrimage Route (Negoroji Road) — From the Temple Grounds Toward the Inner Sanctuary (Oku-no-in) ===
- Gejō-ishi (Dismounting Stones) & Mani-rintō (Prayer Wheel Towers) (Near the 46th chō marker; note that the area in front of the Sanmon [Main Gate]—specifically the Shichimune-mon—marks the 50th chō.)

These markers signify that the area beyond this point is sacred ground; thus, visitors—no matter how high their social rank—are required to dismount from their vehicles, proceed on foot, and offer their prayers.
Along the Negoroji Road—a pilgrimage path leading to Negoroji Temple—stand a Mani-rintō and a Gejō-ishi shaped like a kasa-tōba (umbrella-style stupa). Additionally, a kasa-tōba-style Gejō-ishi is situated in the center of the plaza near the Shiramine Observatory (located along the approach path from the Sakaide direction), while a Mani-rintō-style Gejō-ishi is located behind the Ichi-no-mon (First Gate). The ancient Mani-rintō located along the Negoroji Road (designated as a Prefectural Cultural Property) is currently preserved under a protective shelter. Adjacent to it stands a kasa-tōba-style Gejō-ishi erected by the Takamatsu Domain in March of the 7th year of the Tenpō era (1836), the history of which is inscribed on its reverse side.
The Gejō-ishi located behind the Ichi-no-mon originally stood on the western side of the plaza near the Shiramine Observatory. However, after its main shaft broke—causing its umbrella-stone and getsurin (moon-disc finial) to fall—it was restored and subsequently relocated to the temple's forested grounds in May of the 31st year of the Shōwa era (1956).
Furthermore, a kasa-tōba-style Gejō-ishi remains preserved along the Kamiya Road, one of the temple's historic approach paths. Currently, a total of five Gejō-ishi markers—including those mentioned above—can be identified and viewed on the temple grounds.

- Cemetery of Past Abbots (Near the 45th chō marker)

This site serves as the burial ground for the temple's successive head priests. Although the area is fenced off and entry is prohibited, visitors walking along the pilgrimage route can view a multitude of tombstones and stone Buddha statues from a distance.

- Enmusubi Jizo (Matchmaking Jizo)

Located approximately 20 meters to the left of the main path, starting from a point about 30 meters past the Former Master's Grave (Senshi-bo) in the direction of the Okunoin (Inner Sanctuary).

- 34°19′56.1″N 133°55′55.5″E (Turn left near the 43rd cho marker)

On the left side, you will find a magnificent stone lantern inscribed with the characters "Hoken Bishamonten" (Dedicated to Bishamonten). Turn left here and follow the stone-paved path; you will encounter a pair of stone lanterns. Descend a steep flight of stone steps to reach a small shelter, beneath which sits a boat-shaped stone carving of a standing Bishamonten figure, enshrined within a rocky grotto. Caution is advised as the descent involves navigating a small cliff; extra care should be taken regarding your footing during rainy weather.

- Access: Foot traffic only. (Approx. 15 minutes walk from Shiramine-ji Temple).

Additionally, there is an unnamed waterfall nearby, the sound of which can be heard from this location.

- 34°19′42.55″N 133°56′19.265″E (Near the 34th cho marker)

Continuing past the fork in the path leading to the Okunoin, you will come across a slightly open clearing situated on the right side of the road. This sacred well has been continuously springing forth with water since ancient times without ever running dry; a cho-ishi (distance marker stone) and a stone statue of the Great Master (Daishi) stand beside it. 34°19′57.556″N 133°57′0.998″E
Located at a three-way junction serving three temples—2.7 km to Shiramine-ji, 1.9 km to Negoro-ji, and 5.1 km to Kokubun-ji (via Ipponmatsu)—this site marked a pivotal point for pilgrims. Since the path ascending from Kokubun-ji to this location was particularly steep, many pilgrims chose an alternative route: they would visit Tennō-ji first, proceed to Shiramine-ji, then visit Negoro-ji, loop back to this junction, and only then head onward to Kokubun-ji.

- 34°19′23.889″N 133°56′51.998″E

Situated just 100 meters before the pilgrim path ascending from Kokubun-ji to Goshiki-dai reaches the prefectural road (known as the "Skyline"), this site features a statue of the Ascetic Kōbō Daishi erected at a spot where spring water once welled up, as well as an observation deck offering scenic views.
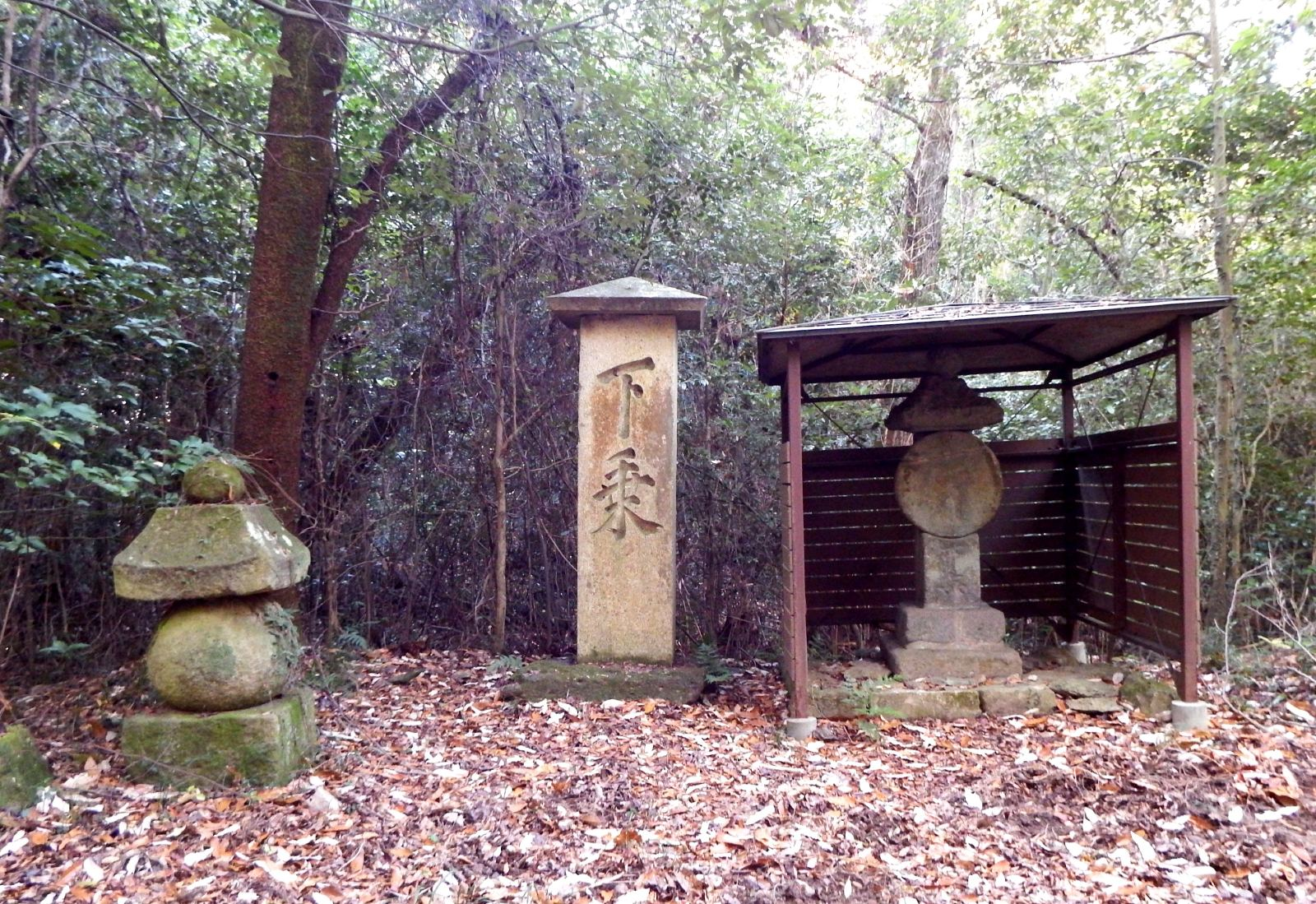
Gejō-ishi (Dismounting Stone) and Manirin-tō (Prayer Wheel Pagoda)

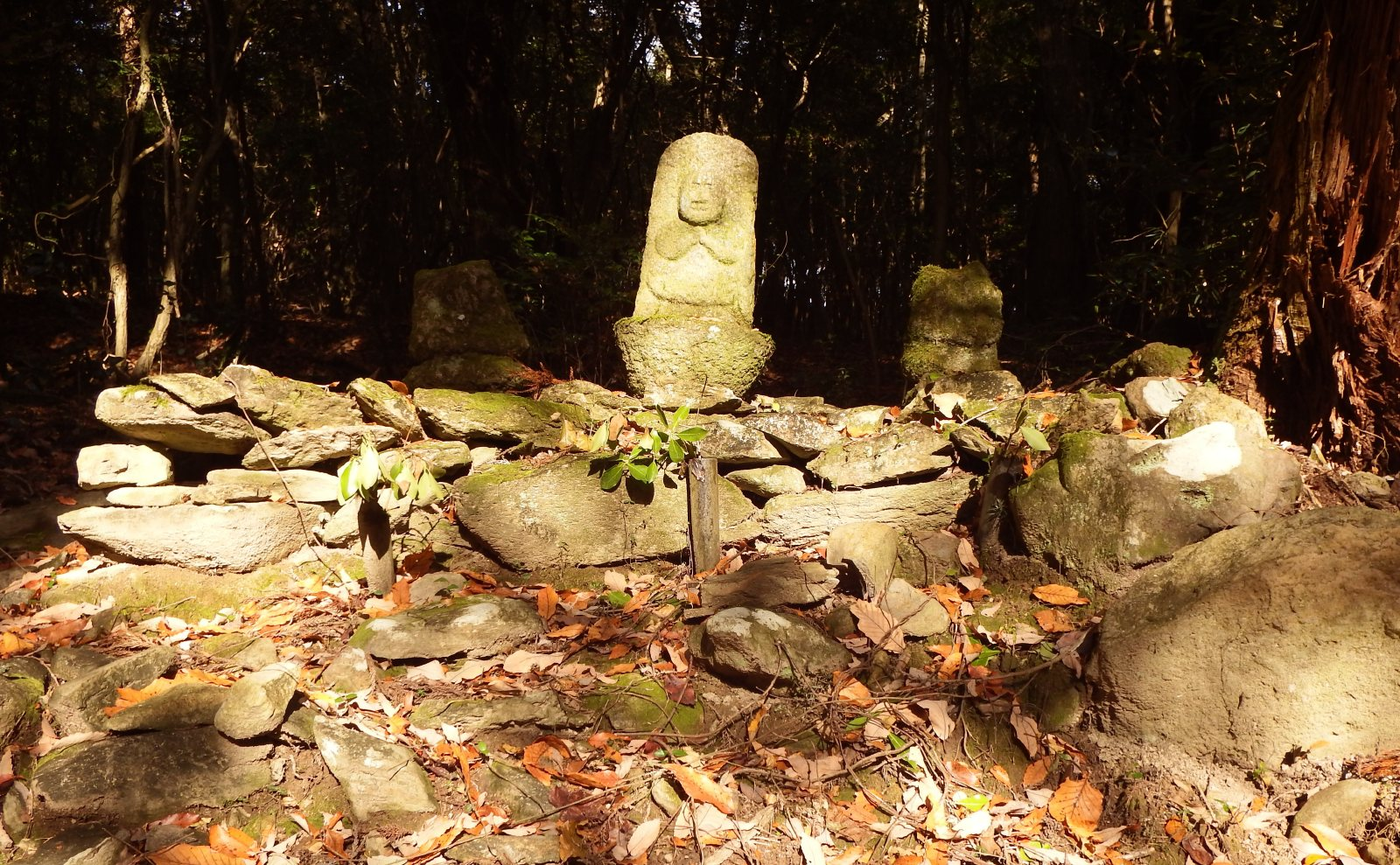
Enmusubi Jizō (Matchmaking Jizō)

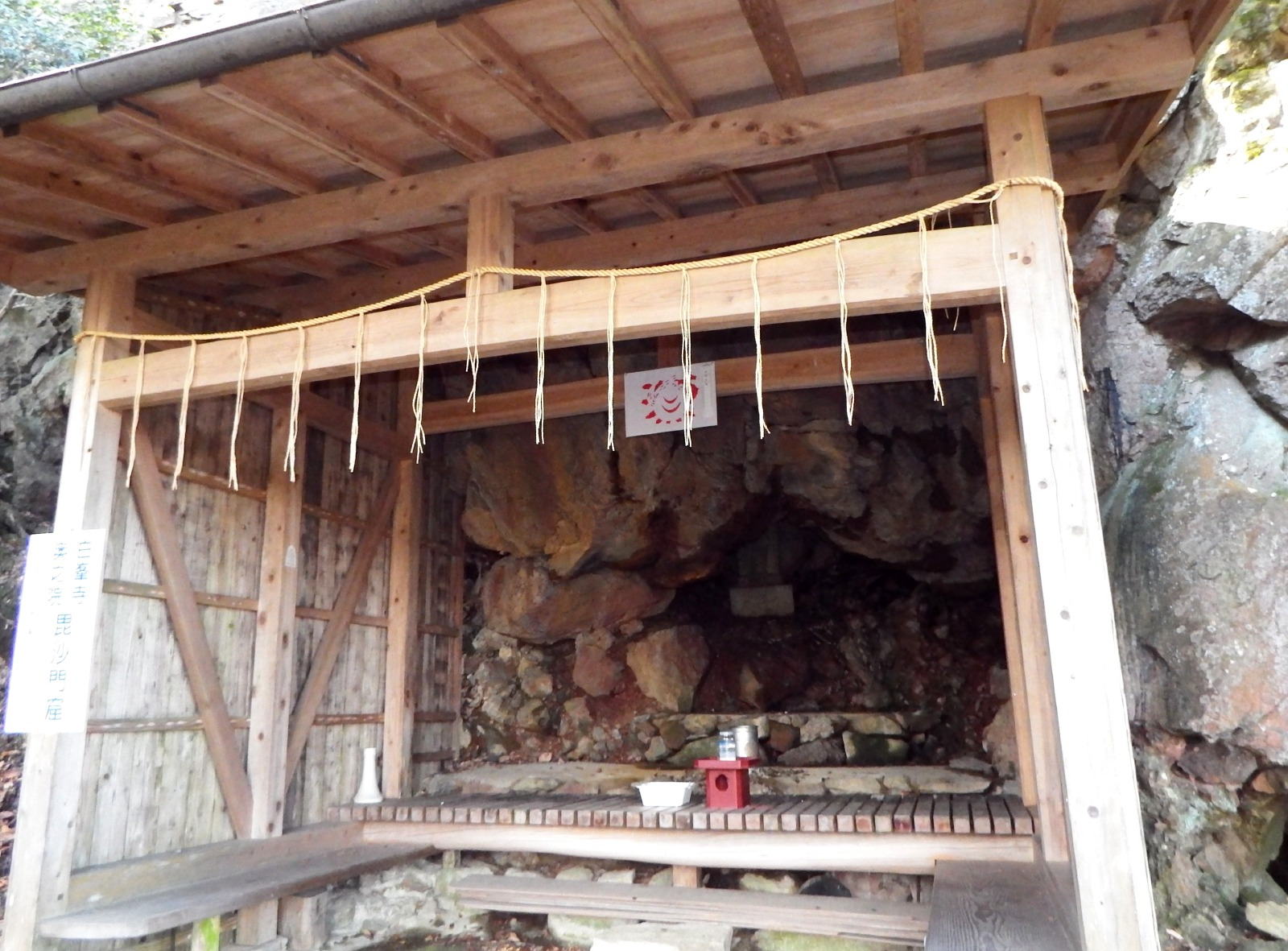
Oku-no-in (Inner Sanctuary) / Bishamon Cave

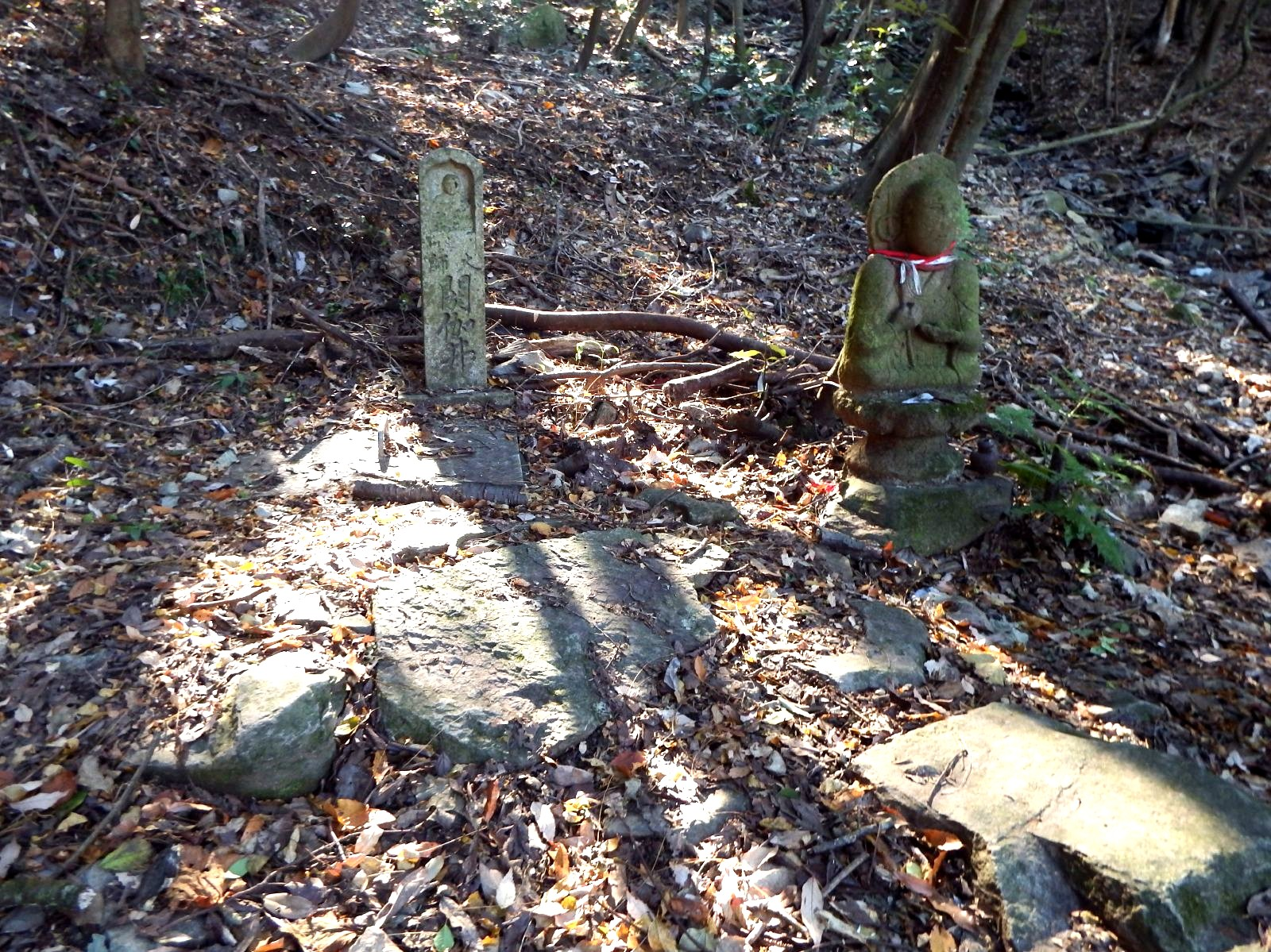
Akai (Sacred Well)

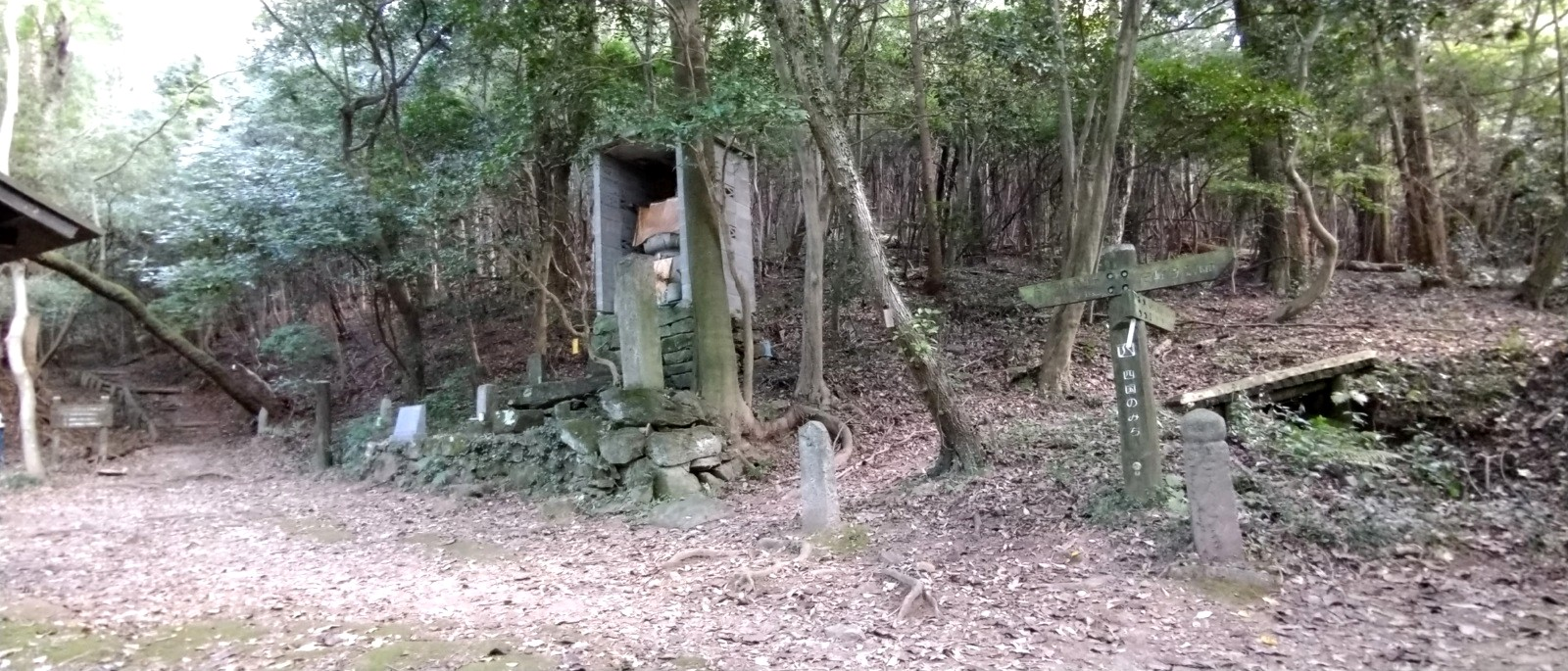
19th Chō Marker (Note: The path to the back-left leads to Negoroji; the path to the back-right leads to Kokubunji; and the path to the front-right leads to Shiromineji.)

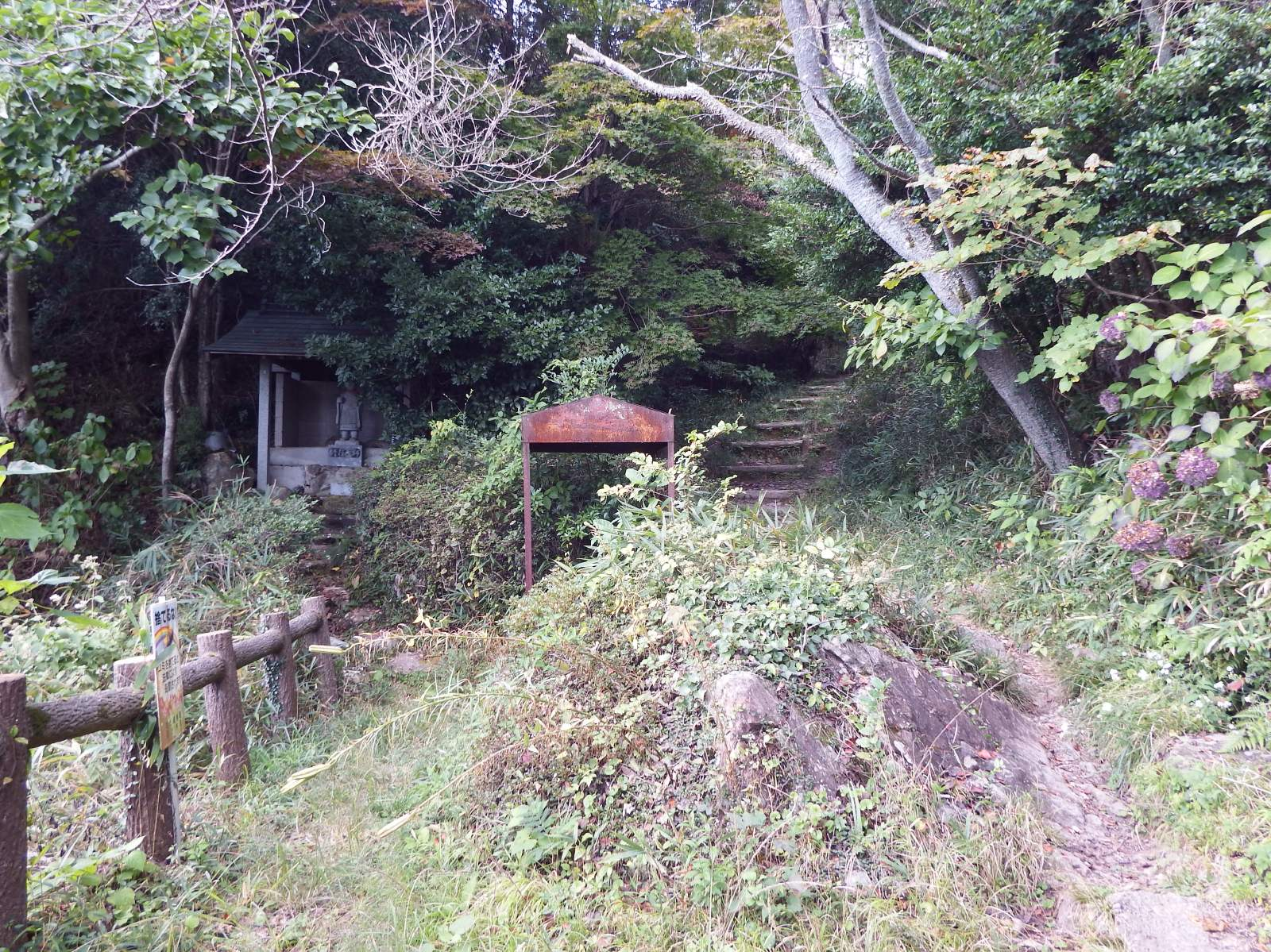
Ippon-matsu (The Lone Pine)
Along the Approach Path from the Sakaide Area

- Naka-no-Jizō (Nakanzō): These three stone Buddha statues were originally situated next to a teahouse located at the midpoint of the Takaya-michi—one of the old approach paths ascending from Takaya Shrine to Shiromineji Temple. However, during the development of the prefectural road, they were relocated to their current site alongside Prefectural Road 180. This location lies roughly midway along the Aomi-michi (another old approach path leading to Shiromineji), situated specifically between Takaya Shrine and Chigo-no-Taki Waterfall. The base of the monument bears an inscription dating its erection to the 24th day of the 7th lunar month in the 7th year of the Bunka era (1810), commissioned by the votary Dorin-in Zomei.
- Shakushidani Jizō and Spring Water: Located just above the aforementioned Naka-no-Jizō along Prefectural Road 180, this site features a small spring that continues to yield water to this day. It houses one stone statue of Kōbō Daishi and three stone statues of Jizō.
- Torii Gate: At the entrance to Takaya Shrine, one stone torii gate (inscribed with "Emperor Sutoku") and one stone lantern (inscribed with "Shiromine Daigongen") currently stand. These monuments were originally situated halfway down the slope leading away from Takaya Shrine; however, they were relocated to their present position when the Takaya-michi approach path was widened and developed into a prefectural road. Originally, the stone lanterns stood as a pair; however, they collapsed following their relocation and were subsequently discarded. There are other torii gates in the vicinity as well—at least within the scope of what can currently be confirmed. These include a single gate located along the side road at the entrance to the Takaya-michi approach path (inscribed with the name of Emperor Sutoku); a gate originally situated near Hayashida Port that was relocated in May 2003—during the construction of shoreline protection works—to a spot along the "Saigyo Hoshi no Michi" (Saigyo's Path), which leads from Aomi Shrine up to this temple; and a gate still standing in Kozai-Nishimachi—part of the old approach path leading from the direction of Takamatsu—where it remains alongside a pair of stone lanterns and a small Jizo shrine.
- Chigo-no-Taki (The Child's Waterfall)

This waterfall is formed by a tributary of the Aomi River, which flows past the front of Shiramine-ji Temple and continues past the Shiramine Imperial Mausoleum. Cascading down from Chigo-ga-take Peak, it becomes a magnificent waterfall with a drop of approximately 100 meters following heavy rains; however, under normal conditions, the water flow is so scant—often leaving the rock face merely damp—that it is sometimes referred to as the "Phantom Waterfall." According to local legend, a monstrous fish once appeared in this area, causing great distress to the local inhabitants. Emperor Keiko dispatched Prince Yamato Takeru (also known as Takeko-no-O) along with a troop of eighty-eight soldiers to slay the creature; however, the soldiers were overcome by the fish's poisonous fumes and collapsed. At that moment, a divine child (a chigo) appeared from Shiramine Mountain; offering the soldiers water from a small jar he carried, he revived them all. The peak to which this divine child flew back is known as Chigo-ga-take, and it is from this peak that the waterfall received its name: Chigo-no-Taki.

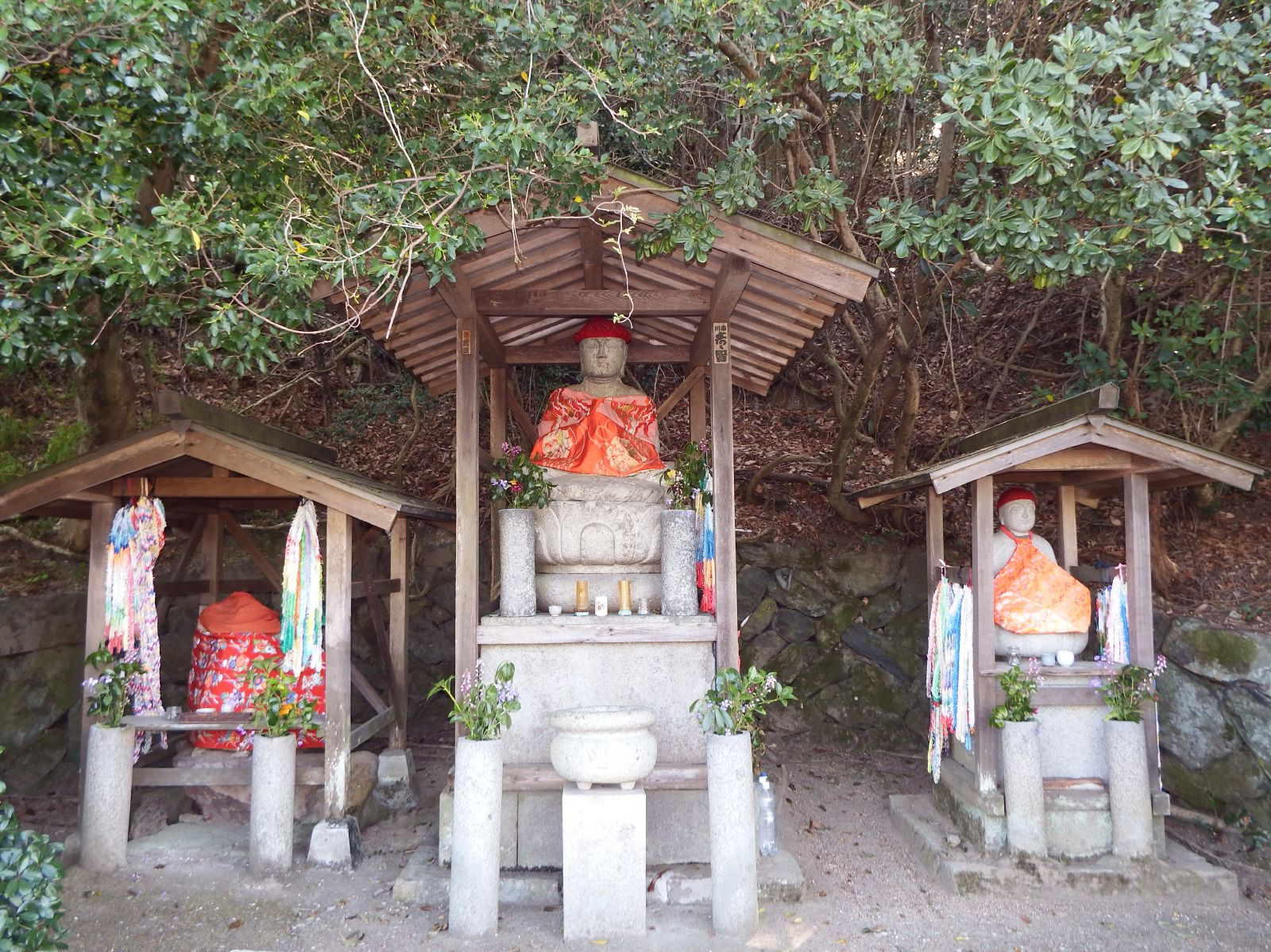
Naka-no-Jizō

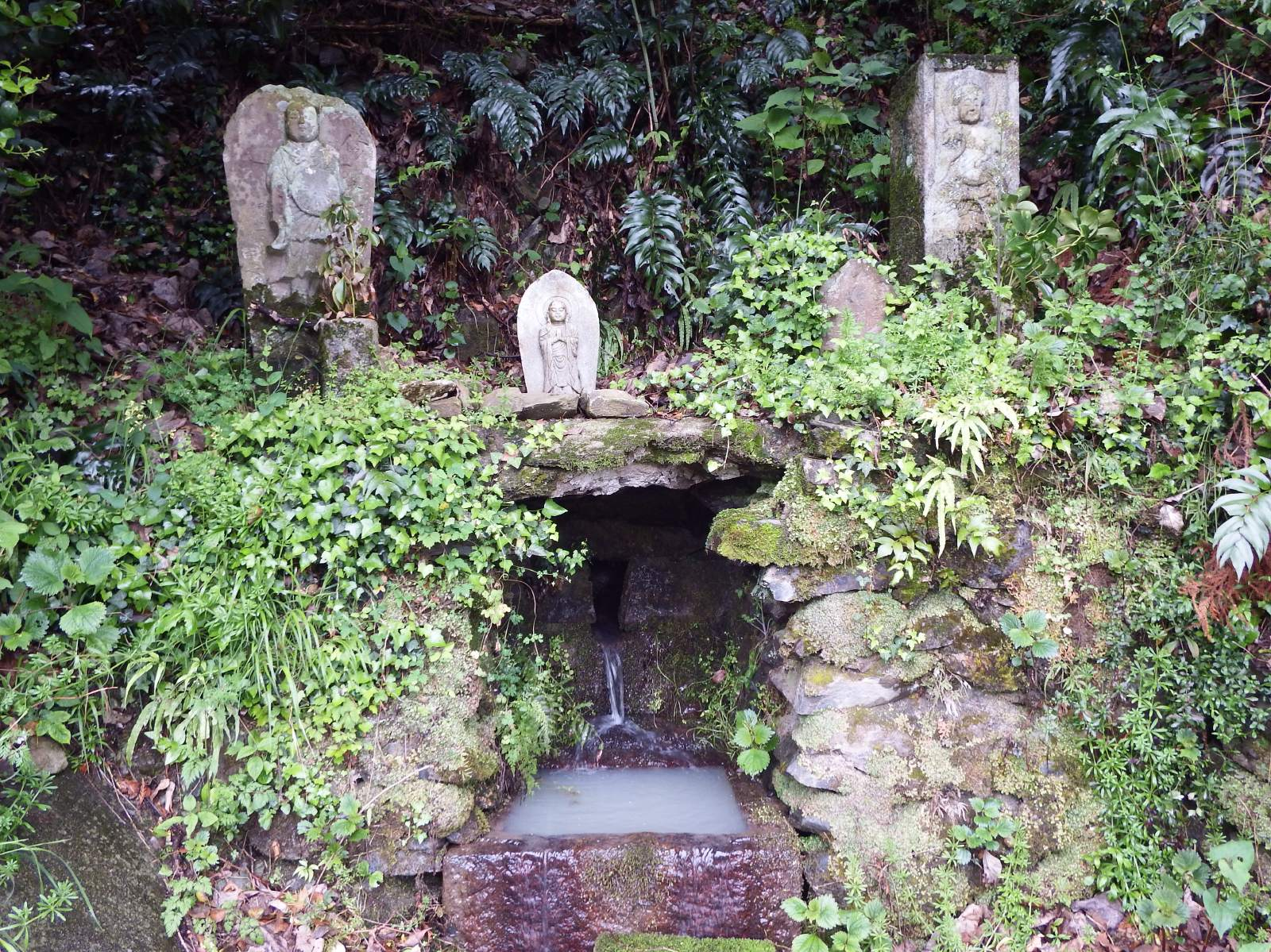
Jizō and Spring Water at Shakushidani

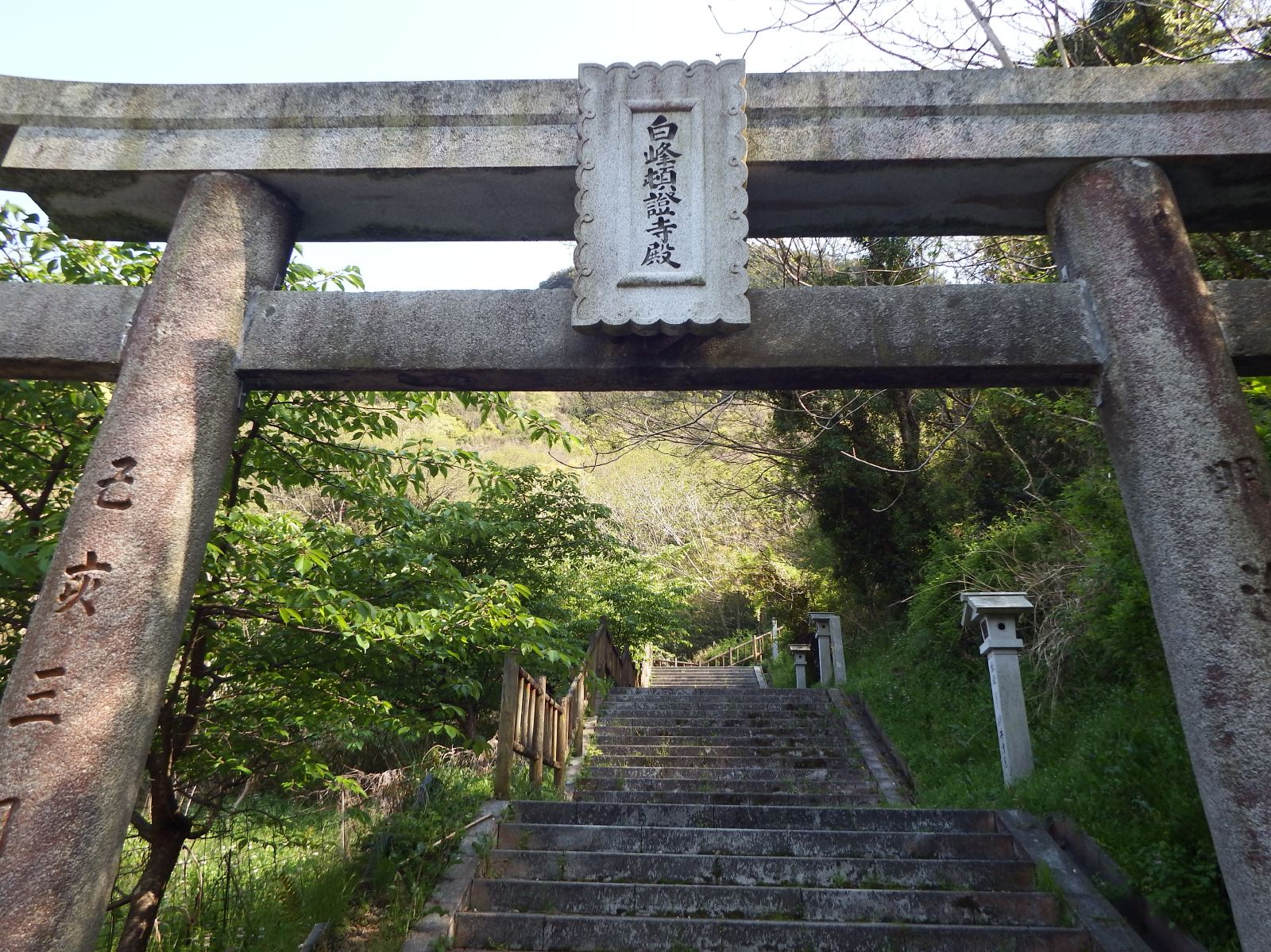
Torii Gate Relocated from Hayashida Port and the Path of Priest Saigyō

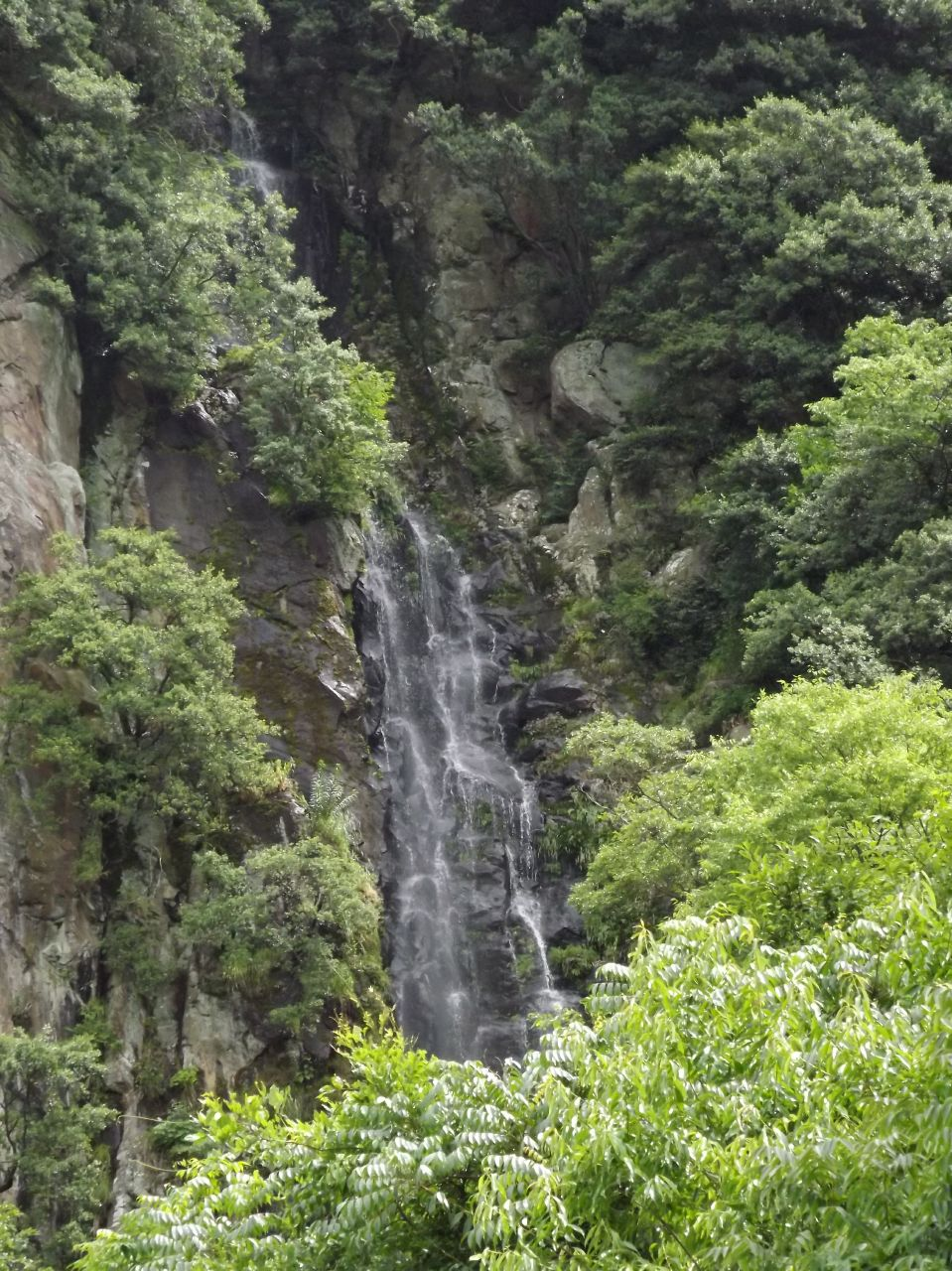
Chigo-no-taki Waterfall

=== Unnumbered Sacred Sites ===
- Matsuura-ji Henjō-in

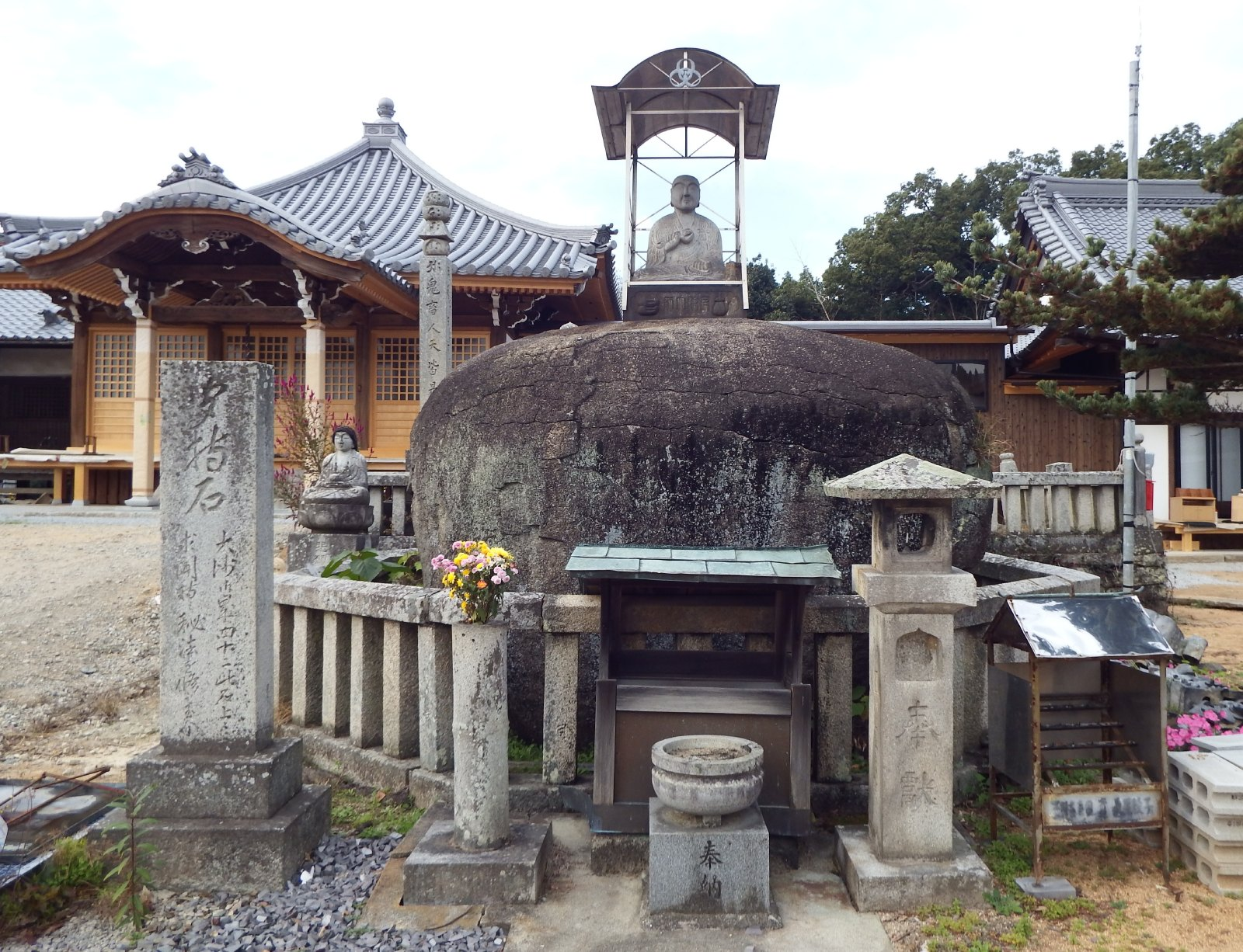
The Monji Stone at Matsuura-ji

This temple serves as the maefudasho (preceding sacred site) for Shiramine-ji. It is said that when Kūkai stayed in this area, a massive stone shaped like a hōju (sacred jewel) emerged from the ground; consequently, he dug a sacred well (akai) to obtain water for offerings before the Buddha and performed the Gumonji-hō ritual atop this very rock. Furthermore, having carved and enshrined a statue of himself at the site, the temple is said to have garnered deep devotion as a sanctuary for Yakuyoke Daishi (the Great Master for Averting Calamities). : Temple Precincts: Daishido (Founder's Hall), Amidado (Amida Hall), Juodo (Hall of the Ten Kings), Jizodo (Jizo Hall), Bishamondo (Bishamon Hall), Gumonji Stone, Kyakuden (Guest Hall), Honbo (Head Priest's Quarters). (Note: The Mirokudo [Maitreya Hall] and Niomon [Two Kings Gate] were dismantled during restoration work conducted in 2017.)
- Location: 624 Takaya, Sakaide City, Kagawa Prefecture (34°20′3.16″N 133°54′25.29″E)

- Goyadake Iwaya-ji (Inner Sanctuary of Matsuura-ji Henjo-in)

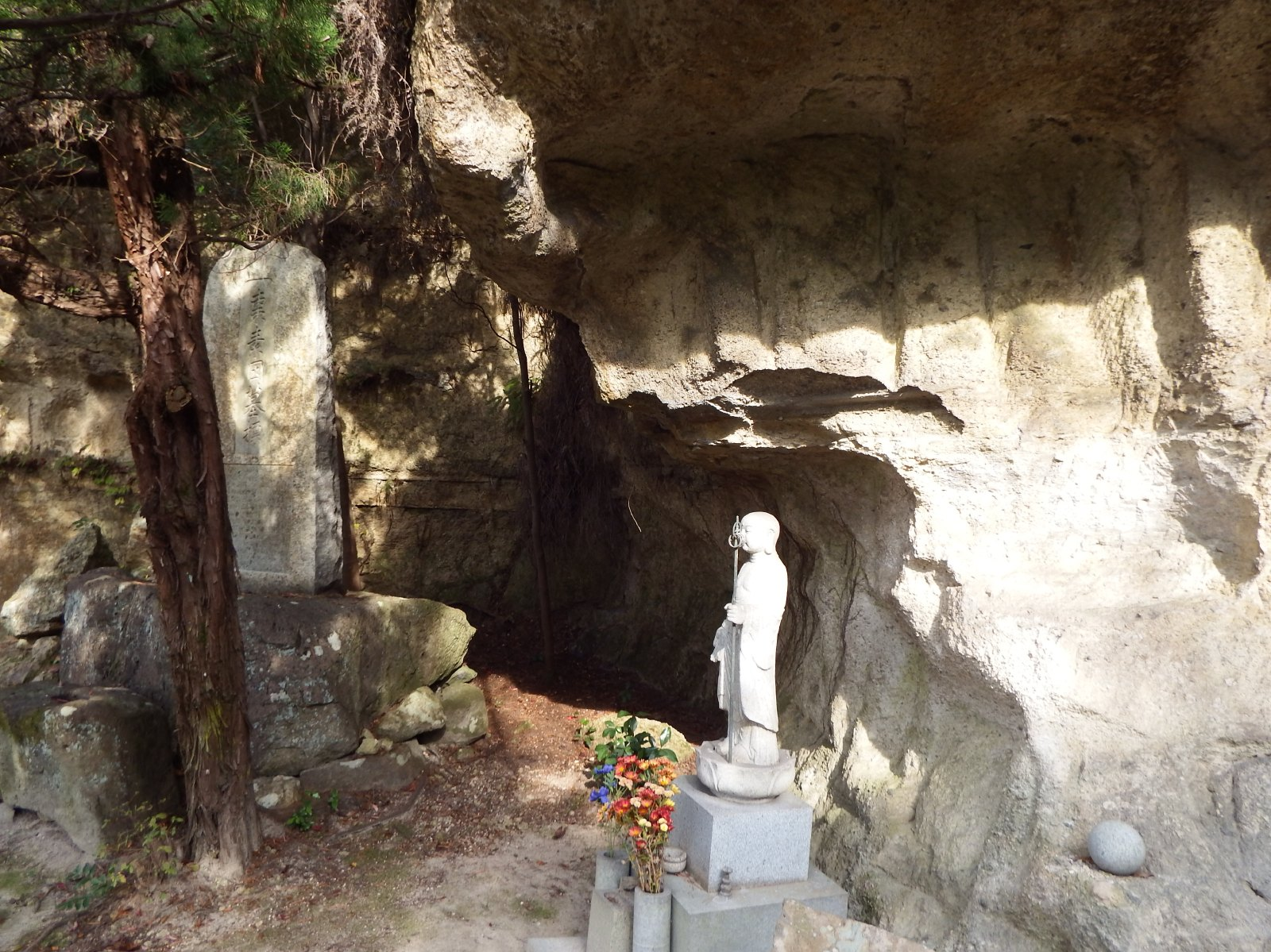
The Rock Cave at Goyadake Iwaya-ji

It is said that while staying at Matsuura-ji, Kukai frequently visited this rocky mountain; he personally chiseled into the cliff face to create a stone cave, which served as a training ground where he practiced the rites of *Goya Nenju* (religious observances performed from midnight until dawn).
- Location: Kamo-cho, Sakaide City, Kagawa Prefecture (34°19′9.4″N 133°54′58.09″E)
Nearby Sacred Sites Associated with Emperor Sutoku

- Aomi Shrine: (Alternate Name: Kemuri-no-miya) — Enshrined Deities: Emperor Sutoku and Fujiwara no Shoshi (Note: The birth mother of Emperor Sutoku). ** Location: 759 Oumi-cho, Sakaide City, Kagawa Prefecture

(34°20′20.26″N 133°55′28.9″E)

- Takaya Shrine (Alternate name: Chi-no-miya) — The enshrined deities are the three divinities of Emperor Sutoku, Taikenmon-in (Note: The Emperor's birth mother), and Amatsumichine-no-kami.
  - Location: 878 Takaya-cho, Sakaide City, Kagawa Prefecture (34°20′9.41″N 133°54′47.15″E)
- Saigyo Hoshi's Path: A 1.34 km route extending from Oumi Shrine to the Shiramine Imperial Mausoleum. Developed in 2003, the path features 88 stone monuments inscribed with poetry and 93 stone lanterns, allowing visitors to enjoy a stroll while reading the verses.

== Goshikiyama (Goshikidai) ==
- Shiramine (Elevation: 357 m) (Mt. Shiramine: 336.9 m): Shiramine-ji Temple, Shiramine Park Area, Shiramine Park Center, New Sunpia Sakaide (Shiramine Hot Spring), Aomi Shrine, Takaie Shrine, Chigo Falls, Saigyo Hoshi Trail
- Akamine (Elevation: 478.7 m): Mt. Ohira, Ashio Daimyojin Shrine, Nakayama Rest Area, Inoshiriyama (Highest point on Goshikidai: 483 m)
- Aomine (Elevation: 449.3 m): Negoro-ji Temple, Goshikidai Youth Nature Center
- Kitamine (Elevation: 389.0 m): Goshikidai Visitor Center, Kyukamura Sanuki Goshikidai
- Kuromine (Elevation: 375.0 m): Kuromine Park Area, Osakiyama Park Area, Seto Inland Sea Historical and Folk Museum, Osakibana Observation Point, Osakibana Cape
- Kinomine (Elevation: 174.8 m)
- Benimine (Elevation: 245.0 m)

== See also ==
- Shikoku Pilgrimage
- List of Buddhist temples in Japan

== Bibliography ==
- Miyazaki Tateki (2007). Shikoku Henro Hitori-aruki Dōgyō Ninin (Shikoku Pilgrimage: Walking Alone, Accompanied by Two). Vol. Map Volume (8th ed.). Henromichi Preservation Cooperation Association.
- Kagawa Prefectural Government, Policy Department, Cultural Promotion Division, ed. (March 2012). Shiramine-ji Investigation Report: Shikoku 88 Temple Pilgrimage, Temple No. 81. Vol. 1. Kagawa Prefectural Board of Education. 22250042. - NCID - BB12299093
- Kagawa Prefectural Government, Policy Department, Cultural Promotion Division, ed. (March 2012). Shiramine-ji Investigation Report: Shikoku 88 Temple Pilgrimage, Temple No. 81. Vol. 1. Kagawa Prefectural Board of Education. 22250045. - NCID - BB12299093
- Shiramine-ji Temple, ed. (September 2013). Ayamatsuyama Shiramine-ji. Sanwa.
- Shiramine-ji Temple (ed.). Shiramine-ji Guide Booklet.
- Kamata Kyosaikai Local History Museum, ed. (September 1978). Guide to the Historical Sites of Retired Emperor Sutoku. Local Culture. Vol. Local Culture 27. Kamata Kyosaikai Local History Museum. NCID - BA83696416
- Aya-Matsuyama History Compilation Committee, ed. (June 1986). History of Aya and Matsuyama. Aya and Matsuyama History Compilation Committee. 87028236.
- Sakaide City History Compilation Committee, ed. (April 1988). History of Sakaide City. Vol. Materials. Sakaide City. 88047348.
- Shikoku 88 Pilgrimage Temples Association, ed. (2006). Pilgrim Guidebook. Shikoku 88 Pilgrimage Temples Association.
- Sakaide City Matsuyama Youth Association, ed. (1966-01-01). Shiramine-ji Temple: A Local History Surrounding the Treasures of Emperor Sutoku. Sakaide City Matsuyama Youth Association. NCID - BB04659262
