= Daihō-ji =

- 大寶寺
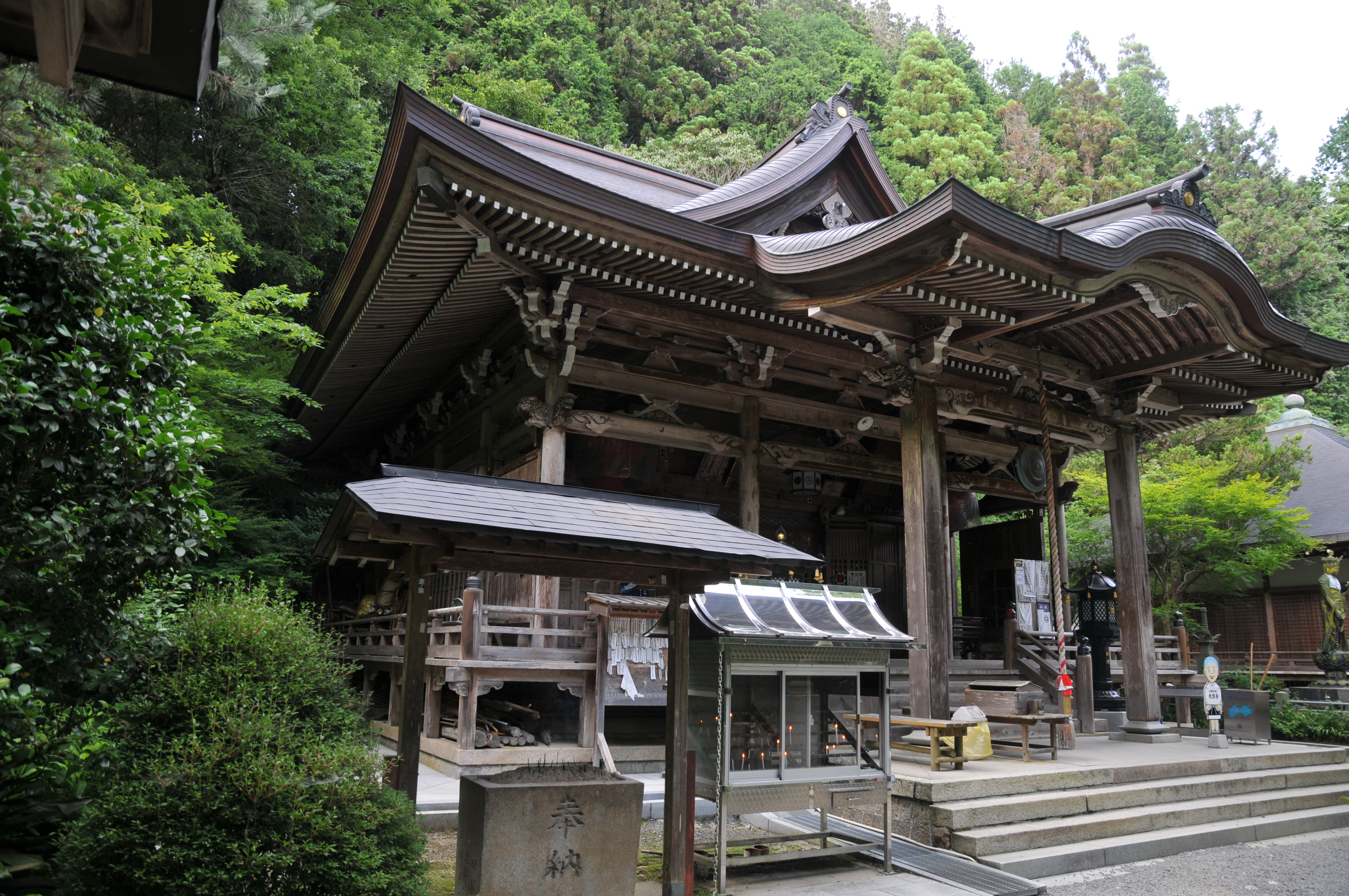

Religion
- Affiliation: Buddhism
- Sect: Shingon-shu Buzan-ha

Location
- Location: 33°39′39.2″N 132°54′43.5″E
- Country: Japan
- Interactive map of Daihō-ji

Daihō-ji (Japanese: 大寶寺) This is a temple belonging to the Buzan branch of the Shingon school of Buddhism, located in Kumakogen Town, Kamiukena District, Ehime Prefecture. Its formal mountain name is Sugouzan, and its institute name is Daikaku-in. The principal deity is the Eleven-faced Kannon Bodhisattva. It serves as the 44th temple on the Shikoku Pilgrimage of 88 Temples and is referred to as the "Middle Temple" (Chū-fudasho). Situated in the Kumakogen highlands, the temple stands at an elevation of 579 meters.

- Mantra of the Principal Deity: Om maka kyaronikya sowaka
- Pilgrim's Hymn: In this present world, we receive the grace of Great Compassion at Sugouzan; ultimately, we await the fulfillment of Amida's vow.

== History ==
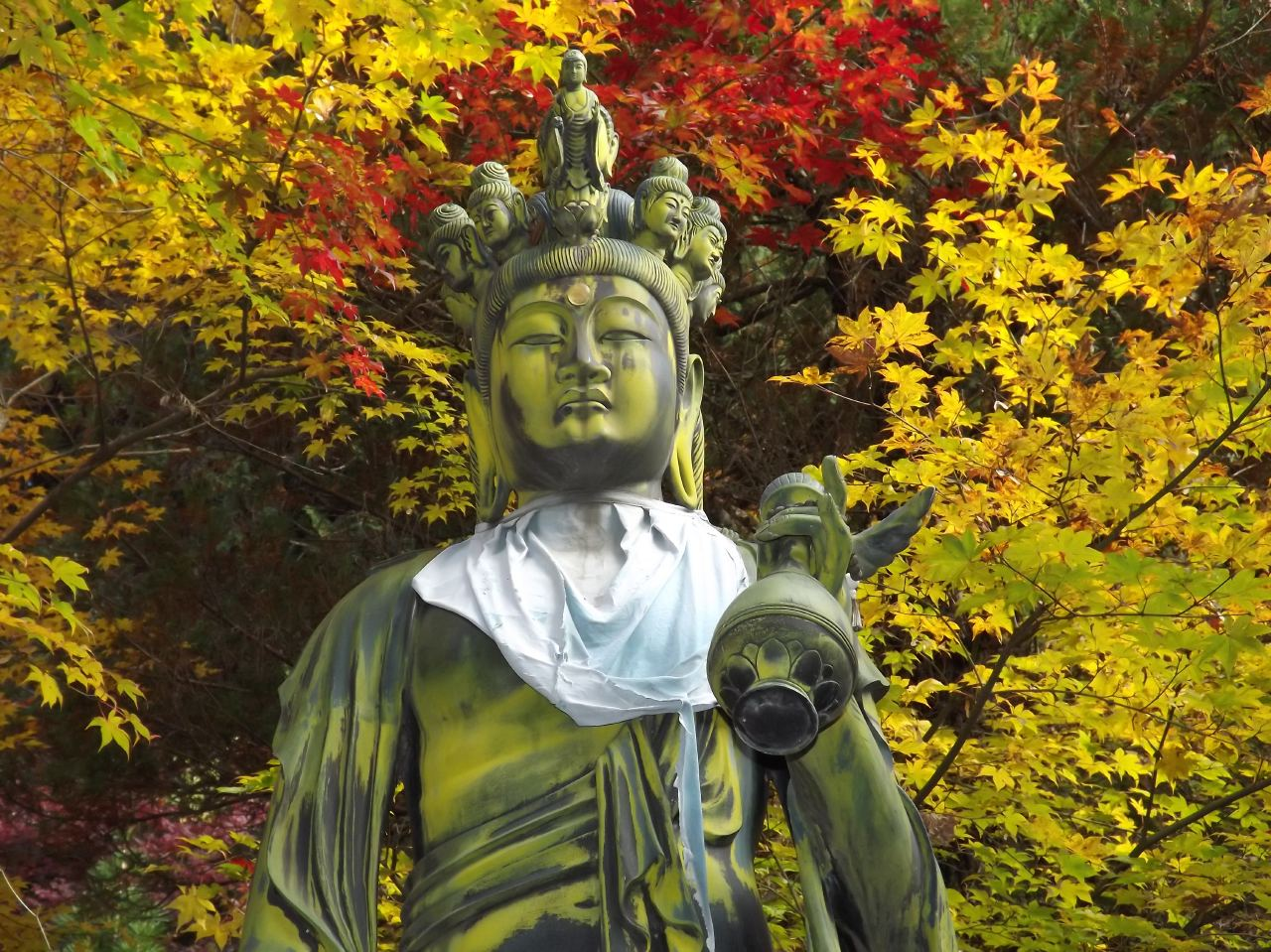
Standing Statue of the Eleven-Faced Avalokiteśvara Bodhisattva

According to temple tradition, the temple's origins lie in the enshrinement of an Eleven-Faced Kannon Bodhisattva statue—brought from the Kingdom of Baekje by a holy monk—within the mountains. It is said that in the first year of the Taihō era (701), two hunter brothers from Aki—Myōjin Ukyō and Hayato—discovered the Kannon statue, built a thatched hermitage, and enshrined it there. Upon receiving a report of this event, Emperor Monmu issued an imperial decree for the construction of a formal temple; the temple was subsequently established and given a name corresponding to the current imperial era. In the 13th year of the Kōnin era (822), Kūkai (Kōbō-Daishi) visited the site, and at that time, the temple reportedly transitioned from the Tendai sect to the Shingon sect of Buddhism.

In the second year of the Ninpei era (1152), the temple was destroyed by an accidental fire. However, in the first year of the Hōgen era (1156), an imperial envoy from Emperor Go-Shirakawa visited to pray for the recovery of the Emperor, who was suffering from a cerebral ailment; when the Emperor subsequently recovered, he dispatched his younger sister—an Imperial Princess—to serve as the temple's head priest. He also bestowed an imperial plaque inscribed with the name "Sugō-zan", and the temple was successfully reconstructed as an *chokugan-ji* (imperial votive temple), featuring a full *shichidō garan* (complex of seven main temple buildings).

Subsequently, during the Tenshō era (1573–1592), the temple was once again destroyed by fire during the military campaigns of Chōsokabe Motochika. However, during the Genroku era (1688–1704), the priest Unshū led a reconstruction effort—supported by figures such as Katō Yoshiaki, the feudal lord of the Iyo-Matsuyama Domain, and the temple was restored to its former glory, also serving as a designated site for prayers for the Matsudaira clan. In the seventh year of the Meiji era (1874), the temple suffered a third total destruction by fire; nevertheless, it was once again successfully rebuilt through the dedicated efforts of the local community.

== Domestic ==
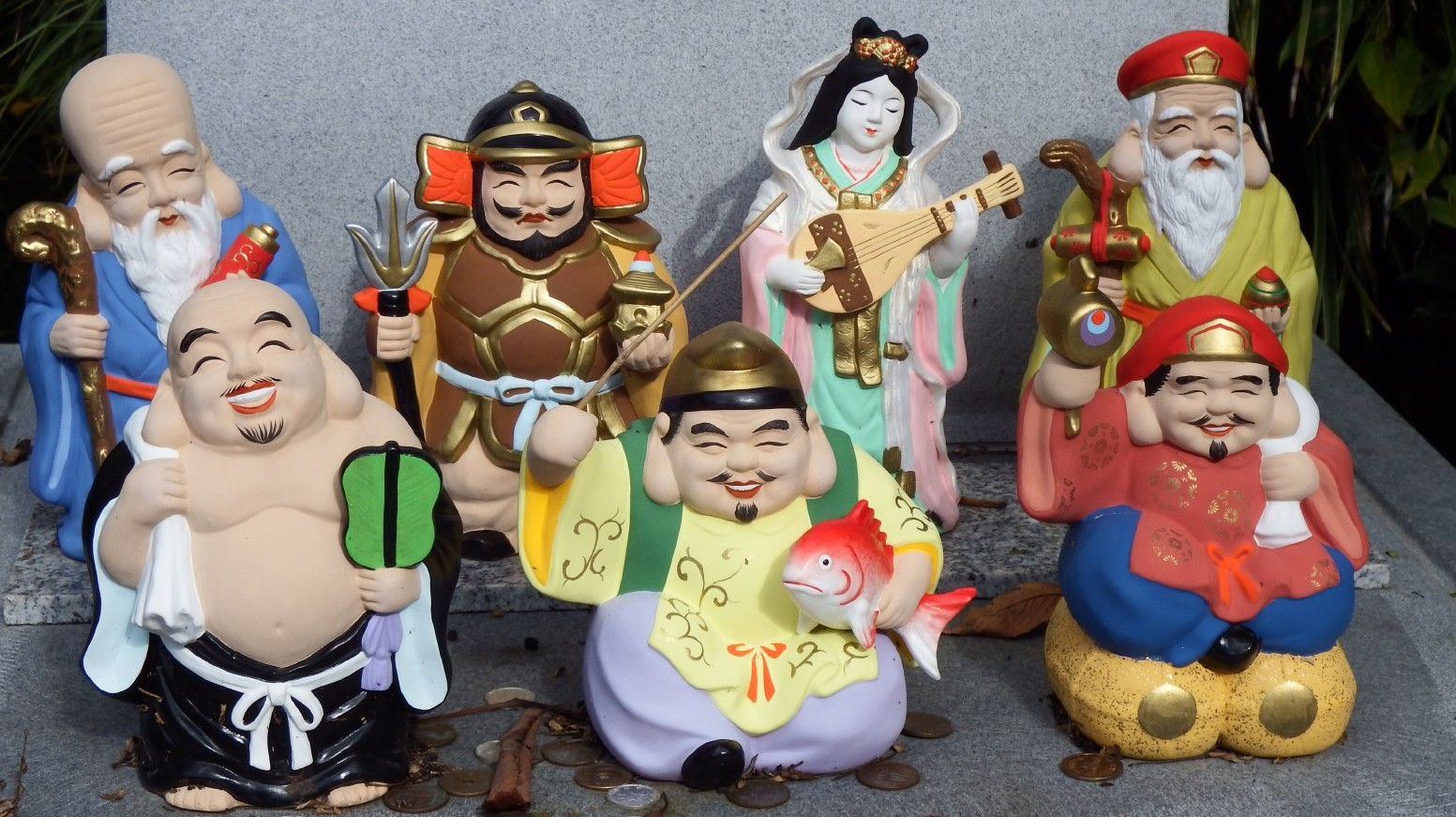
The Seven Lucky Gods

- Main Gate (Somon)
- Outer Precinct Parking Area — While only a small chapel and gate remain today, this site was originally home to a *tatchū* (sub-temple); during the Great Fire of the Meiji Era, when the main temple was devastated, this sub-temple served as the temporary hub for the temple's religious functions.
- Mountain Gate (Nio-mon) — A two-story gate featuring an irimoya (hip-and-gable) roof structure. Embedded in the stone foundation on the right side of the Nio-mon is a stone carving depicting the "Three-Way Stalemate" (Sansukumi)—a classic triad consisting of a snake, a frog, and a slug.
- Main Hall (Hondo) — The current structure was reconstructed in 1925.
- Daishi Hall — Constructed entirely of Japanese cypress (*hinoki*), this hall was reconstructed in 1984.
- Bell Towers — The temple features two bell towers, situated to the east and west. The eastern tower houses the "Bell of Peace"; inscribed upon it are the names of over 1,400 souls—the heroic spirits of those from this district who perished in battle or from illness during the Greater East Asia War. The sound of this bell is regarded as the voice of the temple's principal deity and the voices of these heroic spirits.
- Kōgyō Daishi Hall

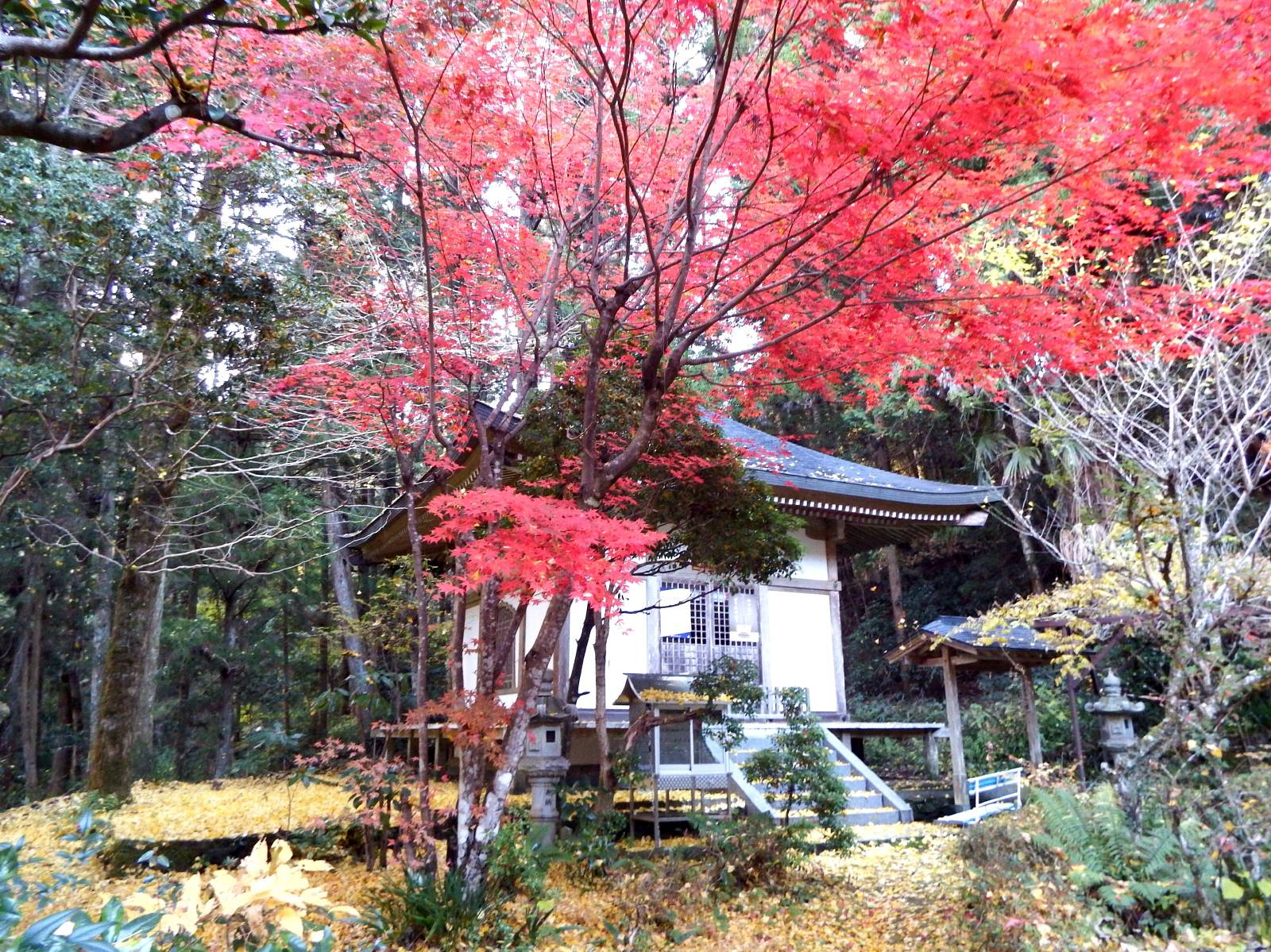
dig up Kanyintang

- Horidashi Kannon-do (Excavated Kannon Hall): This hall enshrines a Kannon statue (actually a group of eight small figures) dating from the late Heian to early Kamakura periods. The statue was excavated in 1934 from beneath the roots of a large tree on the temple grounds, where it lay buried amidst approximately 130 stones, each inscribed with a single character from the Lotus Sutra.
- Basho-zuka (Frosty Night Mound): Erected in 1743 (the 3rd year of the Kanpo era) on October 13th—the 50th anniversary of Basho's passing—this monument was commissioned by Shizan, a haiku poet from Matsuyama, during the memorial service held at the temple. The haiku "Taking my medicine—yet still, a pillow of frost" is inscribed on its reverse side.
- Haiku Monuments: A stone monument bearing Santoka's haiku, "My morning pilgrimage—I alone, amidst the falling ginkgo leaves," stands to the right of the stone steps leading up to the Nokyo-jo (Sutra Transcription Office). Additionally, two monuments—one inscribed with Shizuka Ohori's verse, "Gazing at the stars in the Koniya sky of Oshima, I recall the days I stood guard duty," and another with the phrase "To the myriad Buddhas of this mountain, the dew..."—are located beside the *Chozu-ya* (Purification Pavilion).

Passing through the *Sōmon* (Main Gate), which stands within the town, you will find an off-site parking lot (located on the grounds of a former *tatchū* sub-temple) on your left. After crossing the *Chokushi-bashi* (Imperial Envoy Bridge)—distinguished by its red railings—and entering the wooded mountain area, follow the path ascending to the left to reach the *Niō-mon* (Two Kings Gate). Ascending further via stone steps brings you into the main temple precincts; here, a *Chozu-ba* (Purification Basin) is situated on the left, while the *Nokyo-jo* (Sutra Transcription Office) is on the right. Continuing up the steps, you will find *Shōrō* (Bell Towers) positioned on both sides. The tower on the left houses the temple's historic bell, while the tower on the right houses the "Peace Bell", dedicated to the repose of local war dead who perished during the Pacific War. The *Hondō* (Main Hall) stands directly ahead; to its right stands a bronze statue of the Eleven-Faced Kannon, and further to the right is the *Daishi-dō* (Great Master Hall). The *Kōgyō Daishi-dō* is situated in the back-right corner behind the *Daishi-dō*. Finally, the *Horidashi Kannon-dō* is located in the back-left corner behind the *Hondō*. In the pond situated in front of the *Honbō* (Head Priest's Residence), statues of the Seven Lucky Gods (*Shichifukujin*) are depicted riding a stone boat; however, most of these statues are currently in a damaged state.

- Temple Lodging (Shukubō): Capacity of 150 guests.
- Parking: The off-site parking lot accommodates 20 standard-sized vehicles and 3 large vehicles. The on-site parking lot accommodates 10 standard-sized vehicles only. Both parking areas are free of charge.

== Images ==
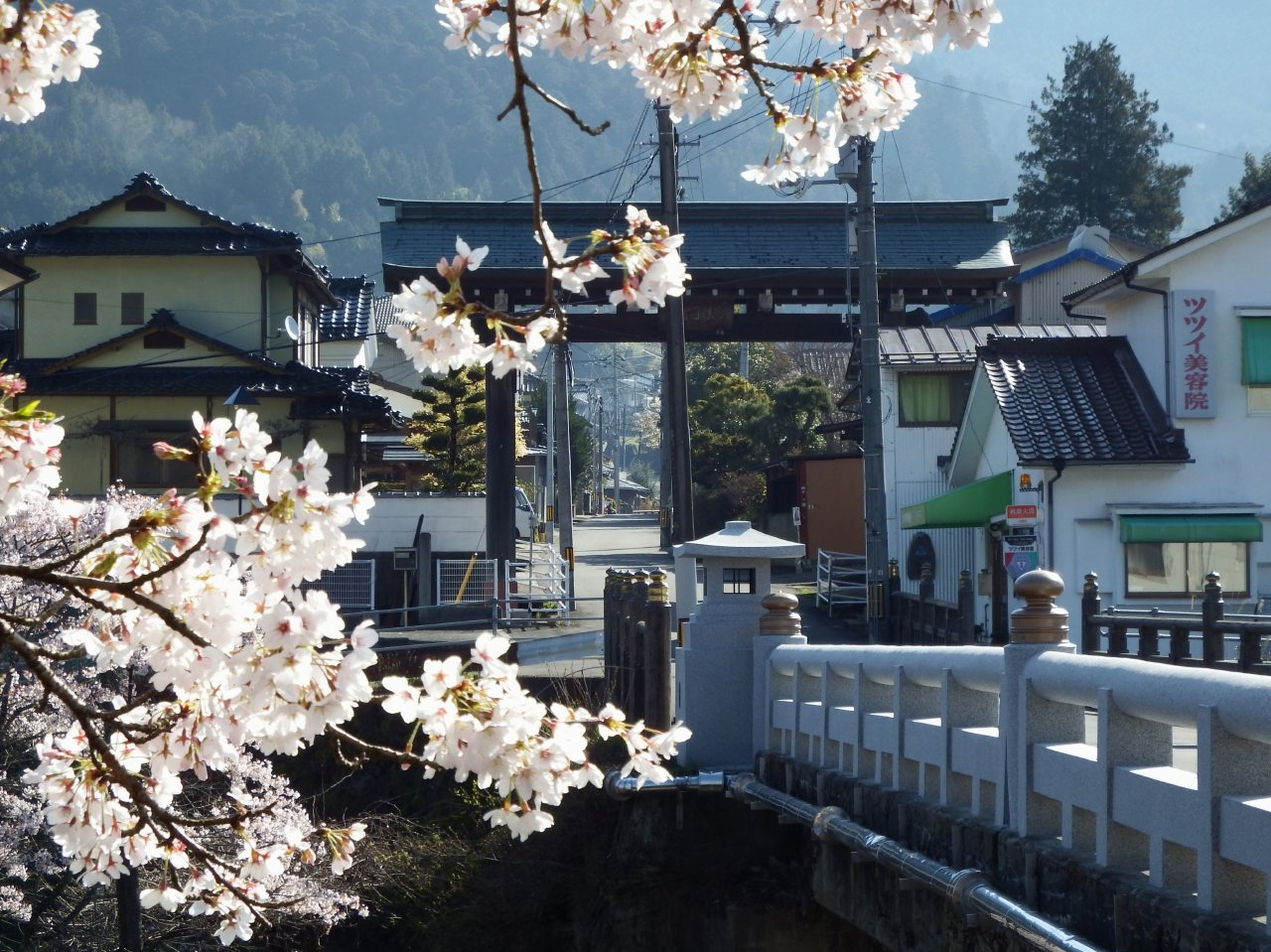
Main Gate

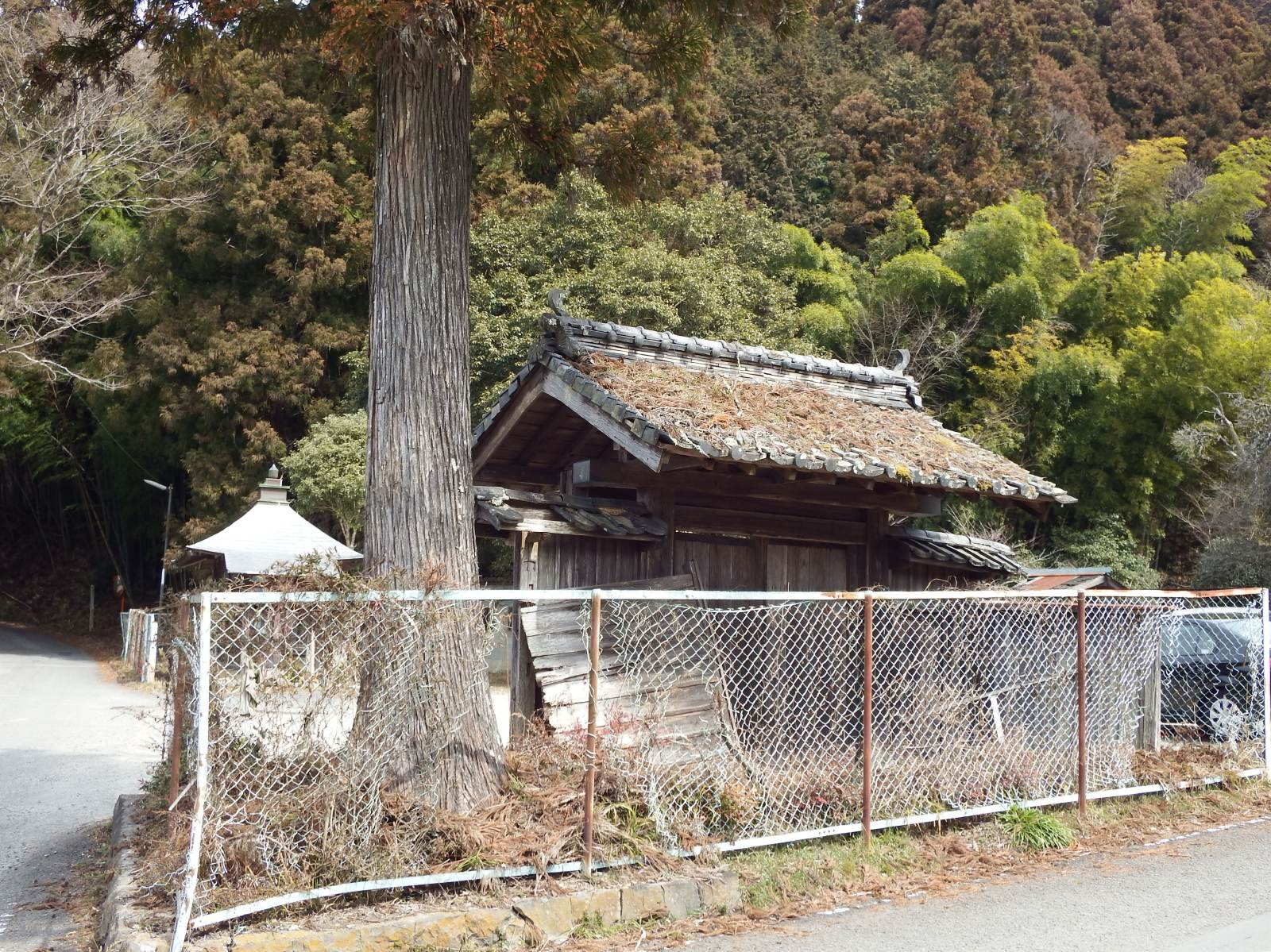
Outer Parking Lot

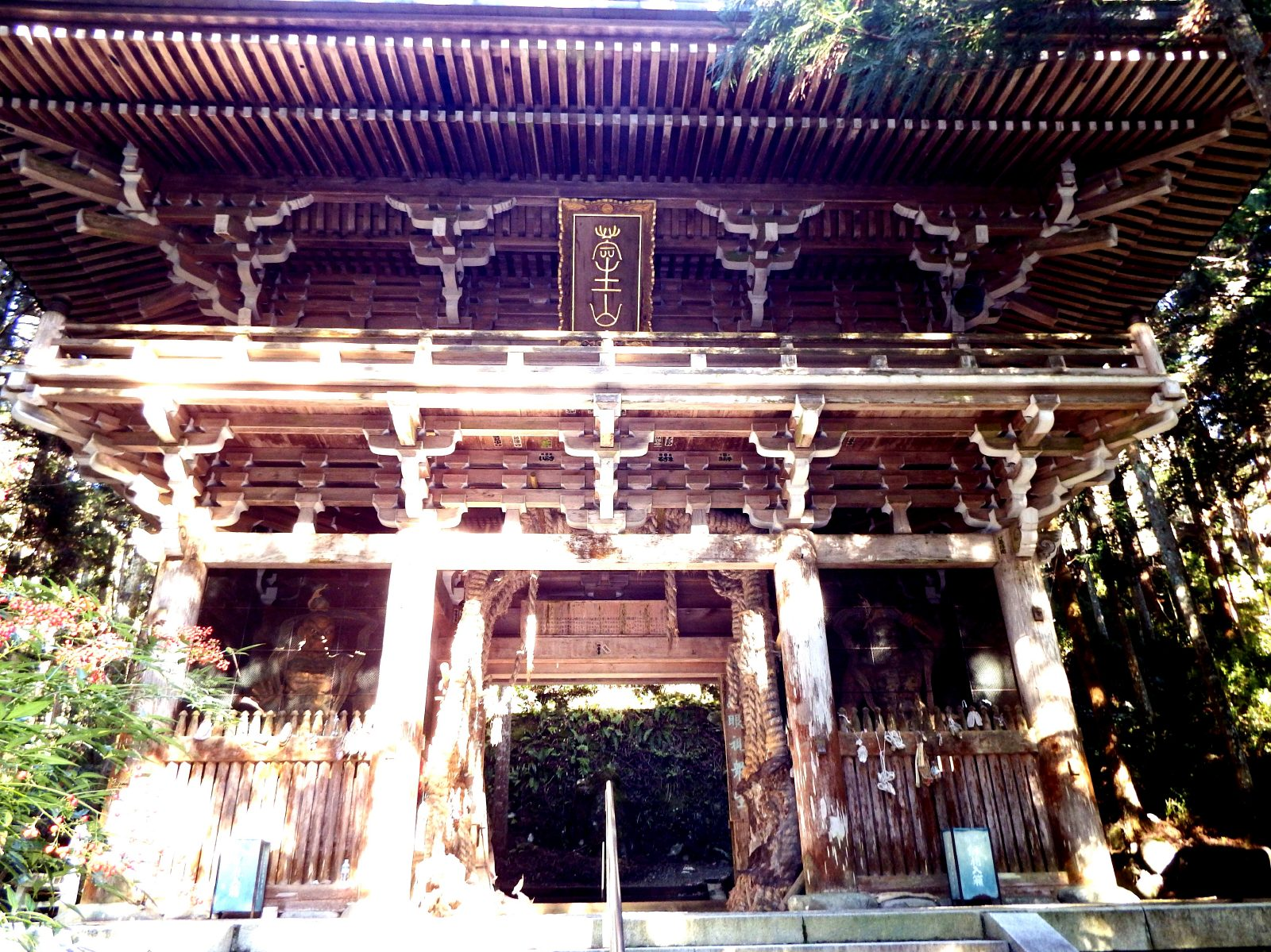
Nio Gate

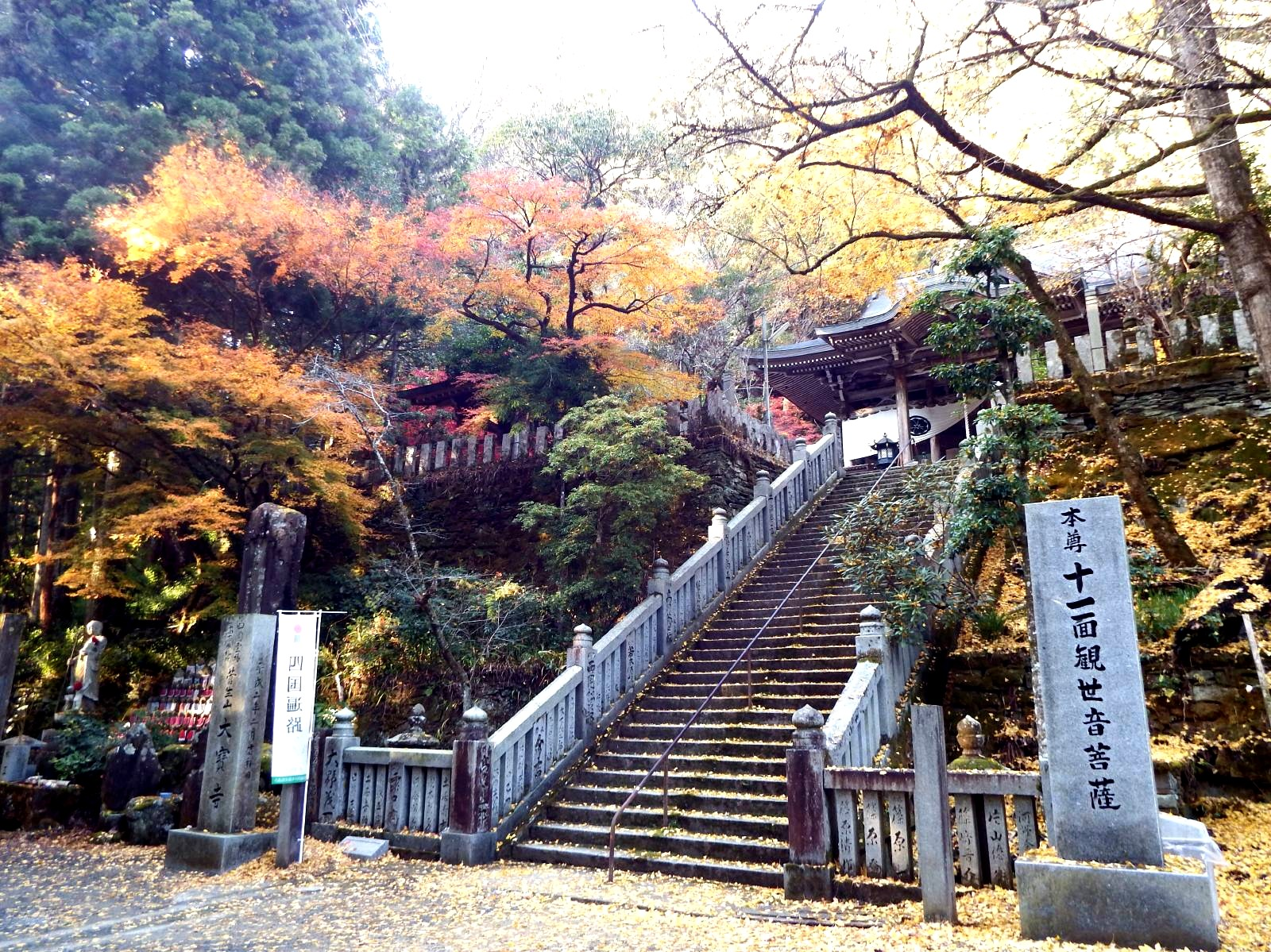
Stone Steps to the Main Hall

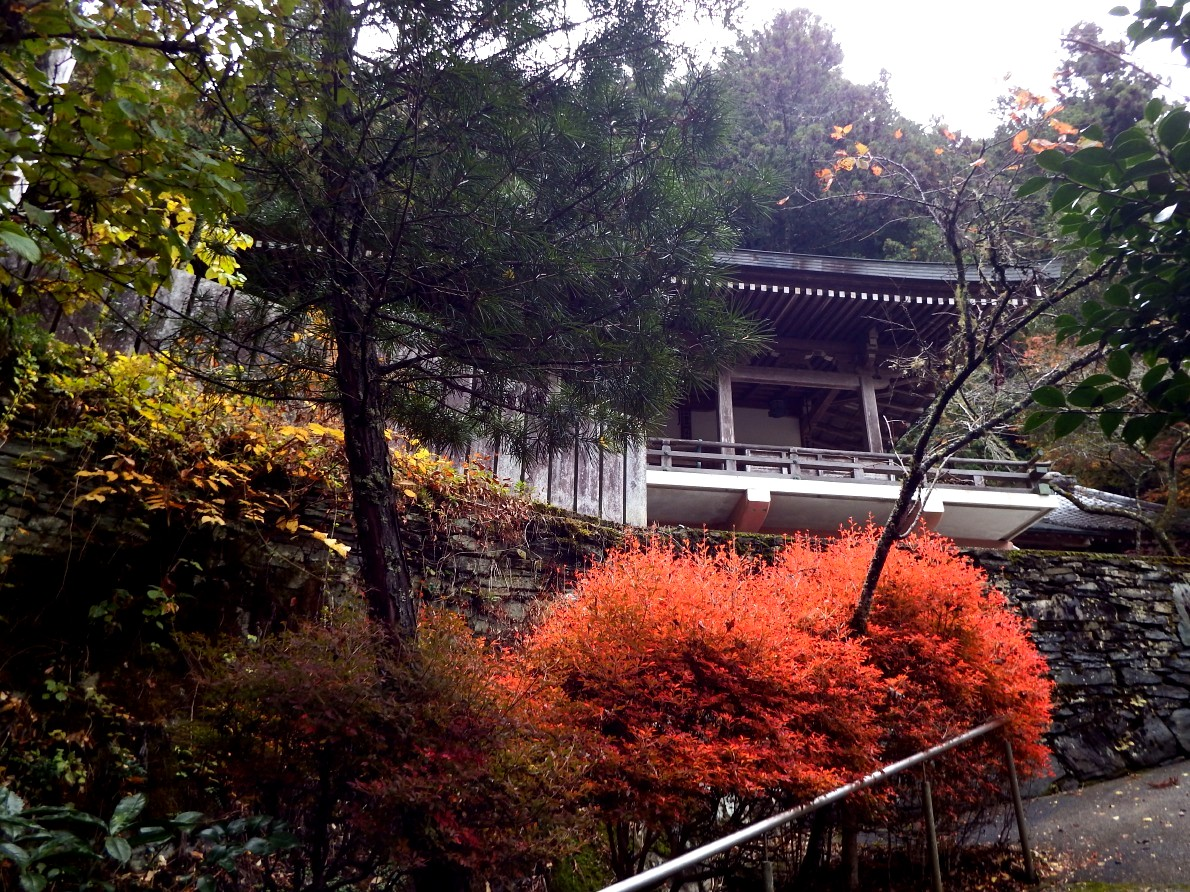
Daishi Hall

== Cultural Properties ==
=== National Historic Site ===
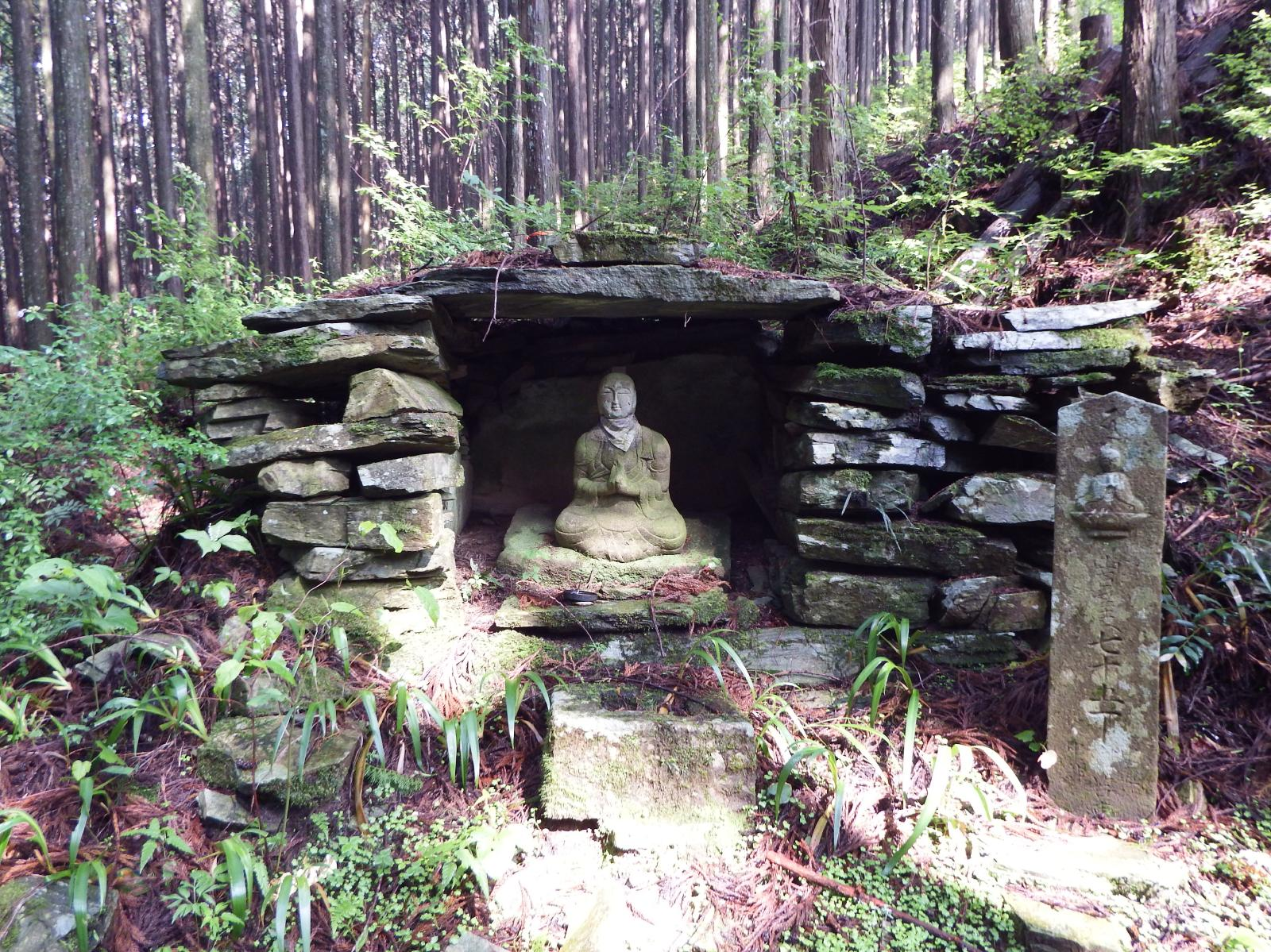
Tōnomidō

- Iyo Pilgrimage Route: Taiho-ji Temple Path — The final approximately 185 meters of the 61.9 km pilgrimage route leading from Akashi-ji Temple to this temple; specifically, the section extending from the Chokushi Bridge (located in front of the temple gate) to the temple's *Nokyosho* (Pilgrim's Stamp Office). Designated on November 10, 2022.
- Iyo Pilgrimage Route: Taiho-ji Temple Precincts — Designated on November 10, 2022.
- Iyo Pilgrimage Route: Iwaya-ji Temple Path — A total of approximately 6.1 km across five distinct sections of the 8.4 km walking pilgrimage route leading from this temple to Iwaya-ji Temple, specifically those sections where the landscape of the historic path has been preserved. Sections 2–4 were designated on March 26, 2021. Sections 1 and 5 were added to the designation on November 10, 2022.
  - The 814-meter section extending from this temple to Toge-mido.
  - The approximately 628-meter section crossing the mountain from Taiho-ji Temple to reach Hatanokawa (extending from Toge-mido to the area adjacent to the eastern entrance of the Toge-mido Tunnel on Prefectural Road 12).
  - The approximately 1,624-meter section located within the hilly terrain of Hatanokawa (extending from a point 700 meters past the entrance to "Furusato-mura", where the path turns right to enter the pilgrimage route, up to the point where it emerges onto an unpaved vehicular road).
  - The approximately 2,029-meter section located near Iwaya-ji Temple (extending from a point—approximately 400 meters to the left of the endpoint of Section 3—where the path leaves the forest road; this section passes the Koiwaya Water Purification Plant, turns right at the subsequent fork to enter the pilgrimage route, ascends the winding *Hatcho-zaka* slope to its summit—where the ruins of the *Hatcho-zaka* teahouse are located—and continues eastward from that fork up to the vicinity of the 785.5-meter triangulation station).
  - The 990-meter section extending from the *Junicho-ishi* (12-Cho Stone Marker) to the *Nio-mon* (Guardian Gate) of Iwaya-ji Temple.

=== Prefecturally Designated Tangible Cultural Property ===
- Sanjusan-todai (Thirty-Three Lampstands): Iron lampstands. Designated on March 27, 1964.

=== Prefecturally Designated Place of Scenic Beauty ===
- Mt. Sugao (Sugaoyama): Designated on March 8, 1968.

=== Kumakogen Town Designated Tangible Cultural Property ===
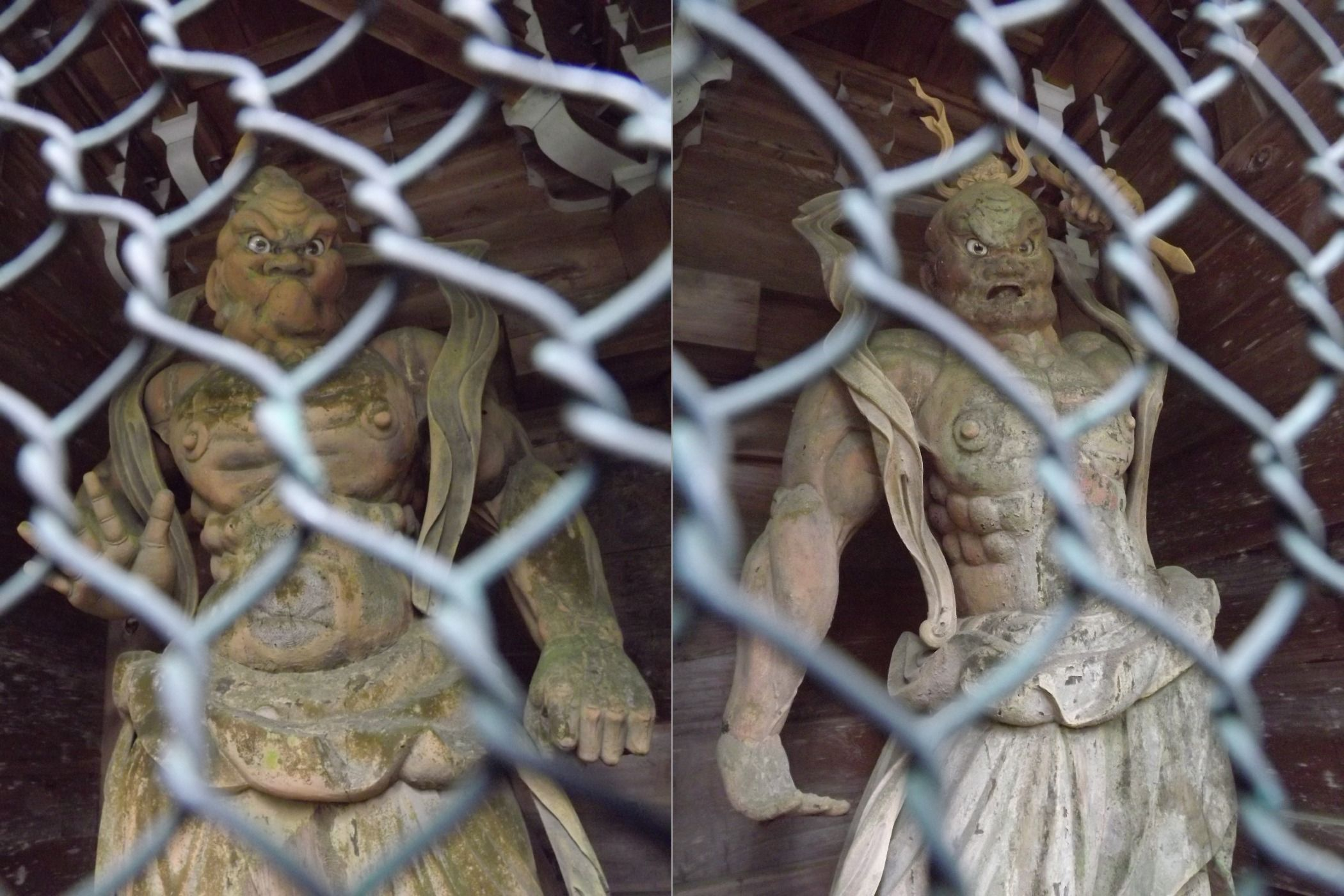
Statue of a Vajra Warrior

- Kongō Rikishi Statues: Designated on August 9, 1995.

This pair—comprising the "Agyō" and "Ungyō" figures—is constructed entirely of Japanese cypress, with a total height of approximately 3 meters each. It is said that they were commissioned during the Muromachi period—specifically in the fourth year of the Kyōtoku era (1455)—and crafted by a Buddhist sculptor known only as "Hōgen [Name Unknown]" from Echizen Province (present-day Fukui Prefecture). Although the Niō Gate itself was destroyed in a fire in 1874 (Meiji 7), the Kongō Rikishi statues miraculously escaped destruction. In 1952 (Shōwa 27), they underwent restoration in Kyoto and were subsequently reinstalled within the Niō Gate.

- Thirty Guardian Deities Statues: Designated on January 15, 1964.

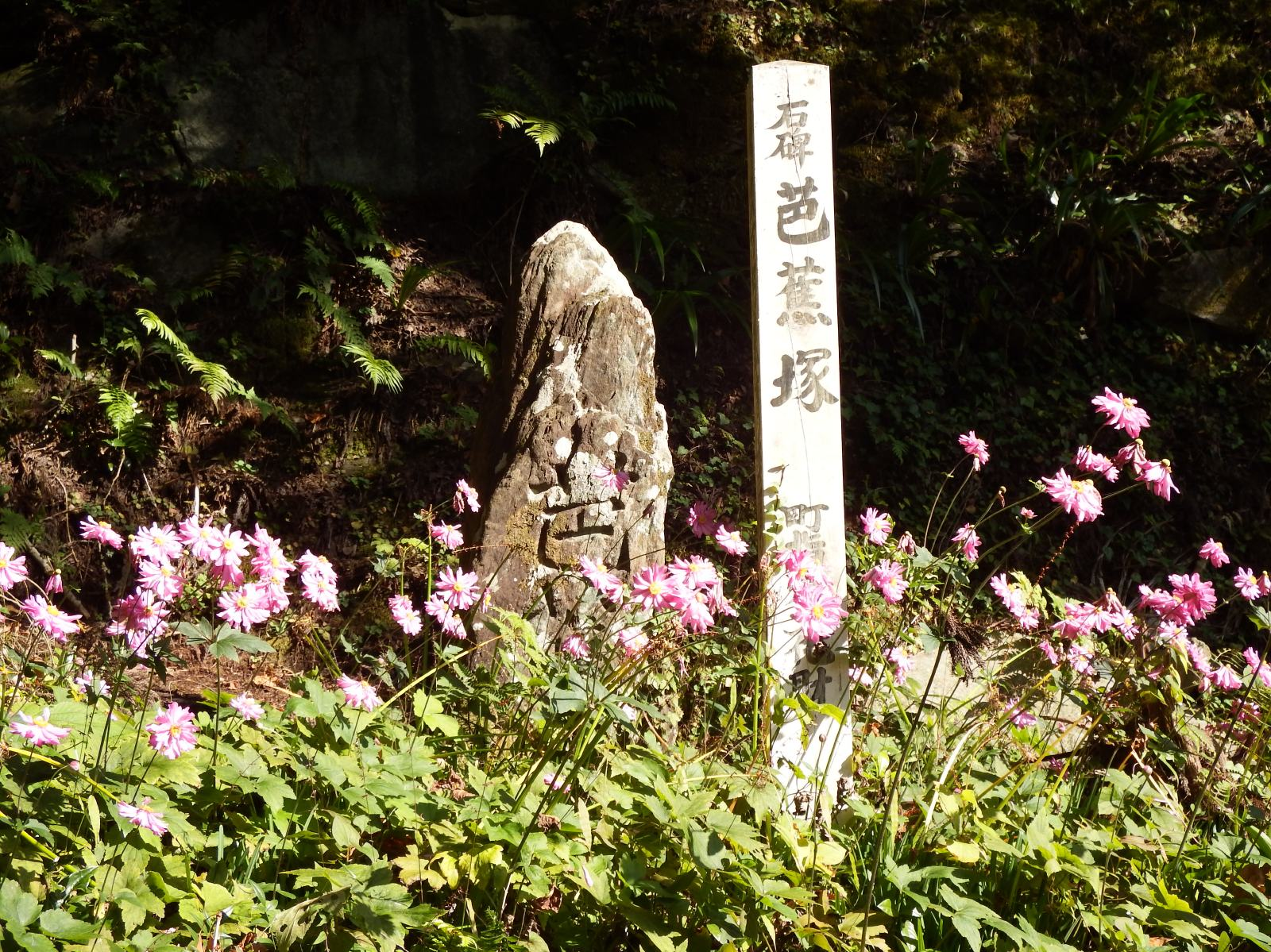
Bashō's Mound

- Basho Mound: Designated May 10, 1991.
- Horidashi Kannon: Designated May 10, 1991.
- Hokyoin-to Pagoda: Located in the rear-left area of the Nio Gate; designated May 10, 1991.

=== Kumakogen Town-Designated Natural Monuments ===
- Hinoki Cypress
- Great Cedar
- Maple Grove

== Access Information ==
=== Railway ===
Shikoku Railway Company (JR Shikoku) – Yosan Line: Matsuyama Station

=== Bus ===
JR Shikoku Bus – Kuma Kogen Line: Alight at "Kuma Junior High School" stop (1.2 km)

=== Road ===
Local Road: National Route 33 – Kuma Kogen (1.2 km)

== Nearby Unofficial Sacred Sites and Related Buddhist Halls ==
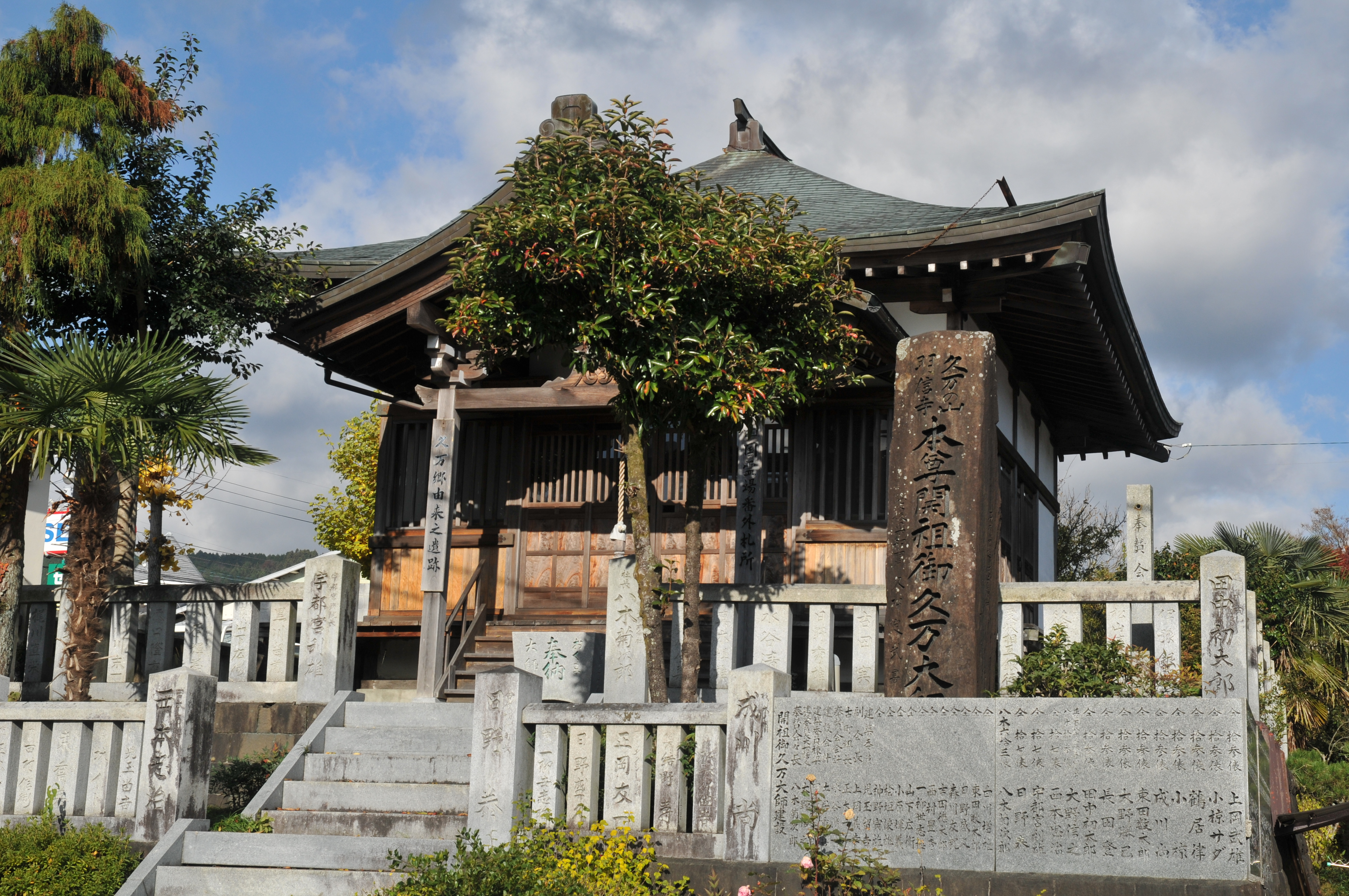
Okuma Daishido

=== Okuma Daishido ===
An unofficial sacred site and an outlying Buddhist hall of Taiho-ji Temple; its principal image is Kobo Daishi (Kukai). According to legend, during the early Heian period, while Kukai was on a pilgrimage through this region, he grew weary from walking in the mountains and sought out a private residence where he might rest. Living in that house was an elderly woman—said by some to have actually been a young maiden—named "Kuma", who treated Kukai with exceptional hospitality. Furthermore, she cut a piece from the cloth she was weaving and offered it to Kukai so that he might wipe away his sweat. Deeply moved, Kukai asked, "Do you have any wish?" Kuma replied, "As this place lies deep within the mountains, we possess nothing of material value. My only hope is that this land may prosper for generations to come." From that time onward, the region indeed began to flourish, and it is said that the place name came to be known as "Kuma", derived from the name of the elderly woman. Kuma was revered by the local community, and in later generations, a Daishi Hall was constructed on this site.

- Location: 560-4 Kuma, Kumakogen-cho, Kamiukena-gun, Ehime Prefecture (33°39′35.65″N 132°54′1.37″E)

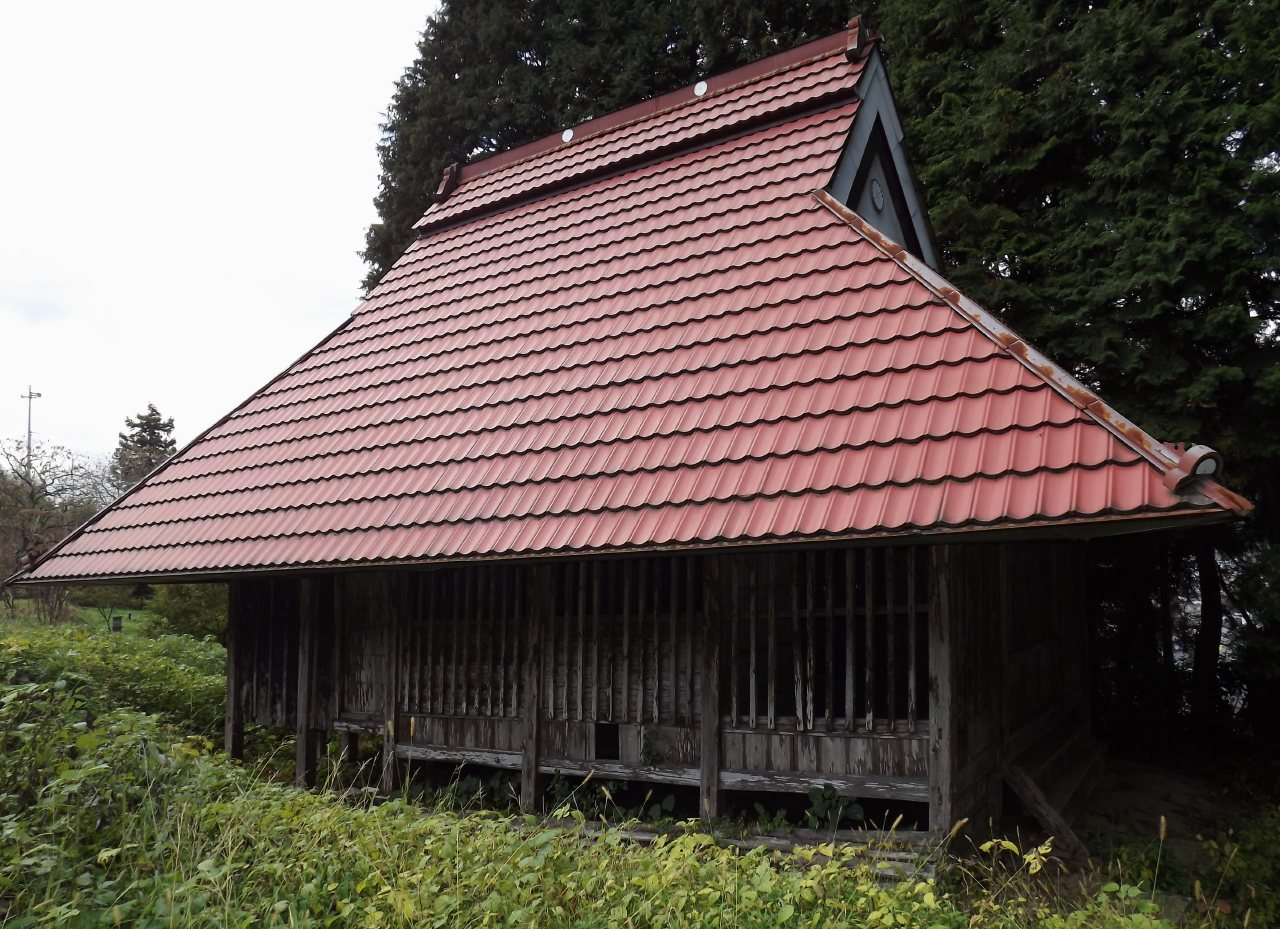
Misasagi Gongen

=== Misasagi Gongendo ===
Situated atop a hill beside the approach to the temple, this hall enshrines the remains of the Imperial Princess—the younger sister of the Cloistered Emperor Go-Shirakawa. It is believed to offer divine efficacy against ailments of the brain and head. The structure itself has fallen into disrepair; consequently, the Hokyointo (treasure-store seal pagoda) and all other sacred treasures have been relocated to Taiho-ji Temple for safekeeping.

- Location: 2-863-3 Sugao, Kumakogen-cho, Kamiukena-gun, Ehime Prefecture (33°39′36.38″N 132°54′33.77″E)

=== Kuma Shin-Shikoku Koyasan Daishido (Great Master Hall) ===
During the Genroku era, Yamauchi Kosai carved a water channel through a rocky mountain to divert water to the rice paddies. (This channel, known as the Kosai-kyo—measuring 57 m in length, 2.2 m in width, and 1.5 m in depth—was designated an Ehime Prefectural Historic Site on October 10, 1950.) This hall is said to have been established to honor his achievements.

- Location: Nishimyojin, Kumakogen-cho, Kamiukena-gun, Ehime Prefecture (33°40′19.86″N 132°53′32″E)

=== Hiwada Pass ===
The pass is named after an incident during Kukai's pilgrimage: after enduring continuous rain, the weather finally cleared up around this pass, prompting him to exclaim, "What a fine day (hiwada)!"

- Location: Kuma, Kumakogen-cho, Kamiukena-gun, Ehime Prefecture (33°38′47.2″N 132°52′57″E)

=== Danjiri Rock ===
Located to the west of the aforementioned pass, this is a sacred site where Kukai is said to have stamped his feet in frustration (*jidan-da*—also referred to as *danjiri*) after feeling such intense hunger that he grew angry at his own lack of spiritual discipline. :* Location: Nimei, Kumakogen-cho, Kamiukena-gun, Ehime Prefecture (33°38′44.4″N 132°52′53.2″E)

=== Tōnomidō ===
This marks the first mountain pass encountered on the pilgrimage route ascending into the mountains from this temple (33°39′45.958″N 132°55′3.566″E) [Elevation: 714m]. On the side facing the temple, there is a rock shelter enshrining a seated stone Buddha (Jizo Bodhisattva), with the 75th chō-ishi (distance marker) standing beside it. After crossing the pass immediately above this point and descending for about 10 minutes—just as the path levels out—you will reach a slightly wider clearing (33°39′52.954″N 132°55′8.832″E) [Elevation: 655m]; here, another rock shelter enshrines a seated stone Buddha with three faces and six arms (Hayagriva Bodhisattva). Descending for another 10 minutes or so brings you to the area beside the Tōnomidō Tunnel on Prefectural Road 12.

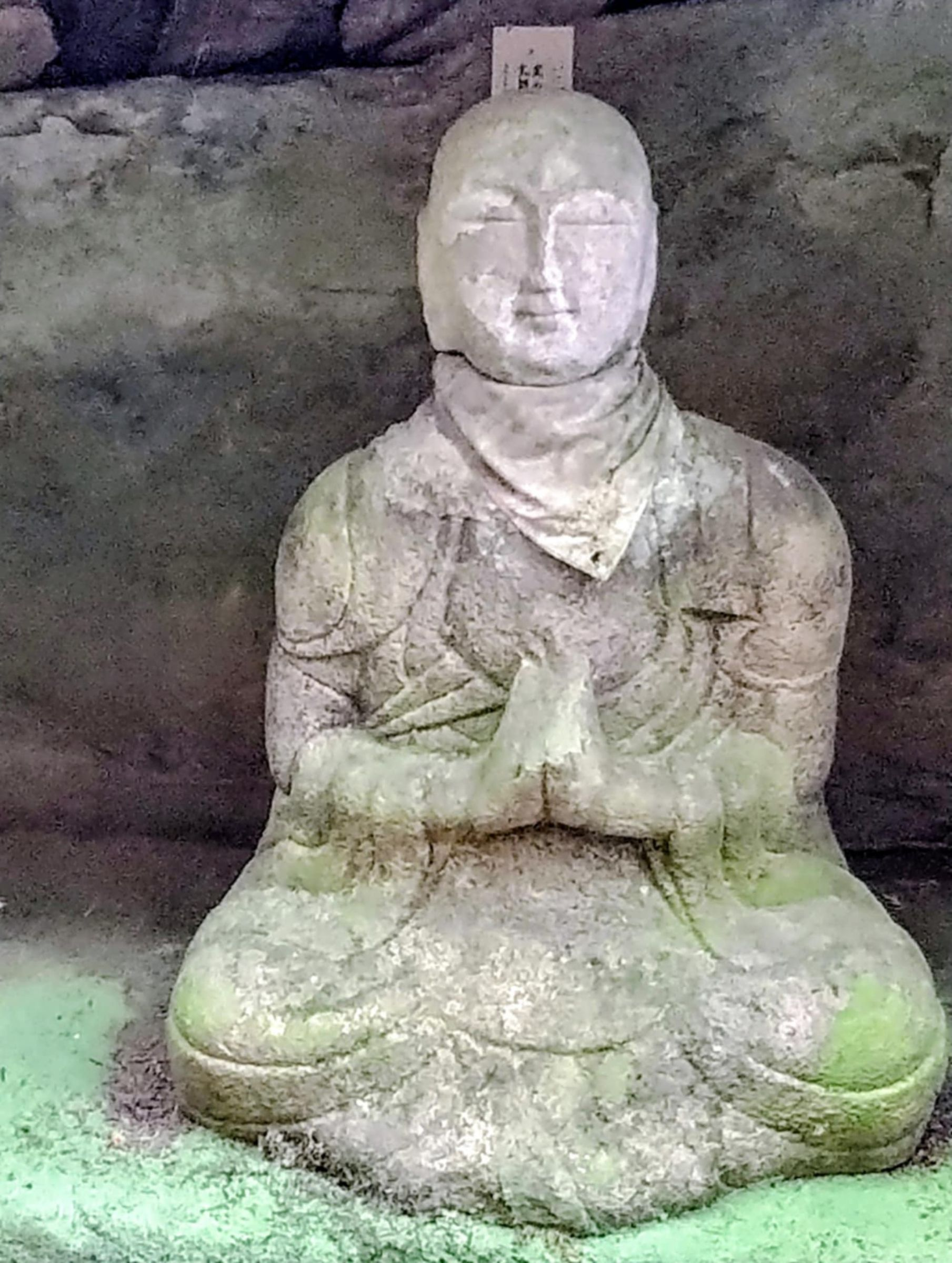
Seated Stone Buddha at Tōnomidō

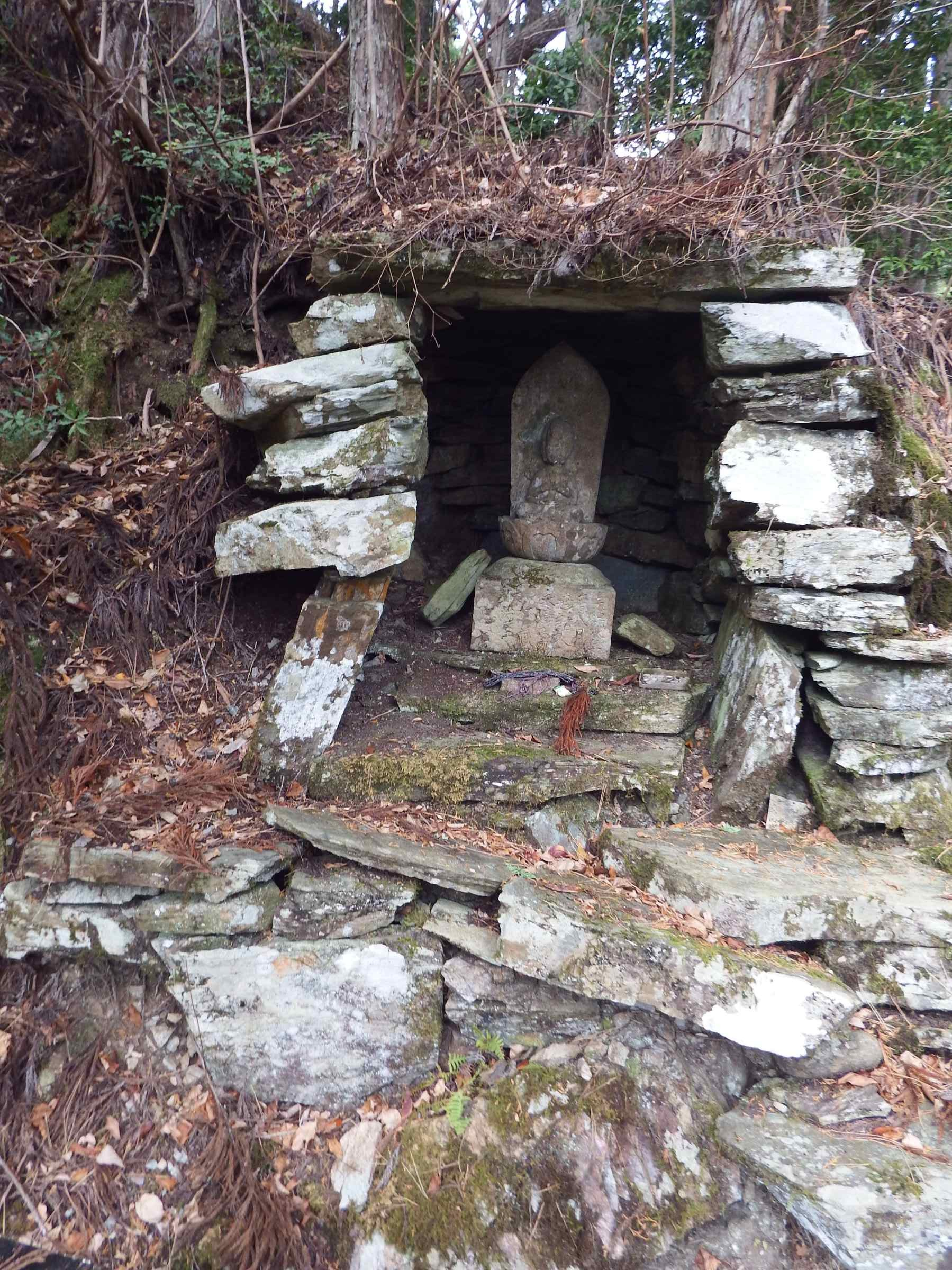
Rock shelter housing the seated stone Buddha near Tōnomidō

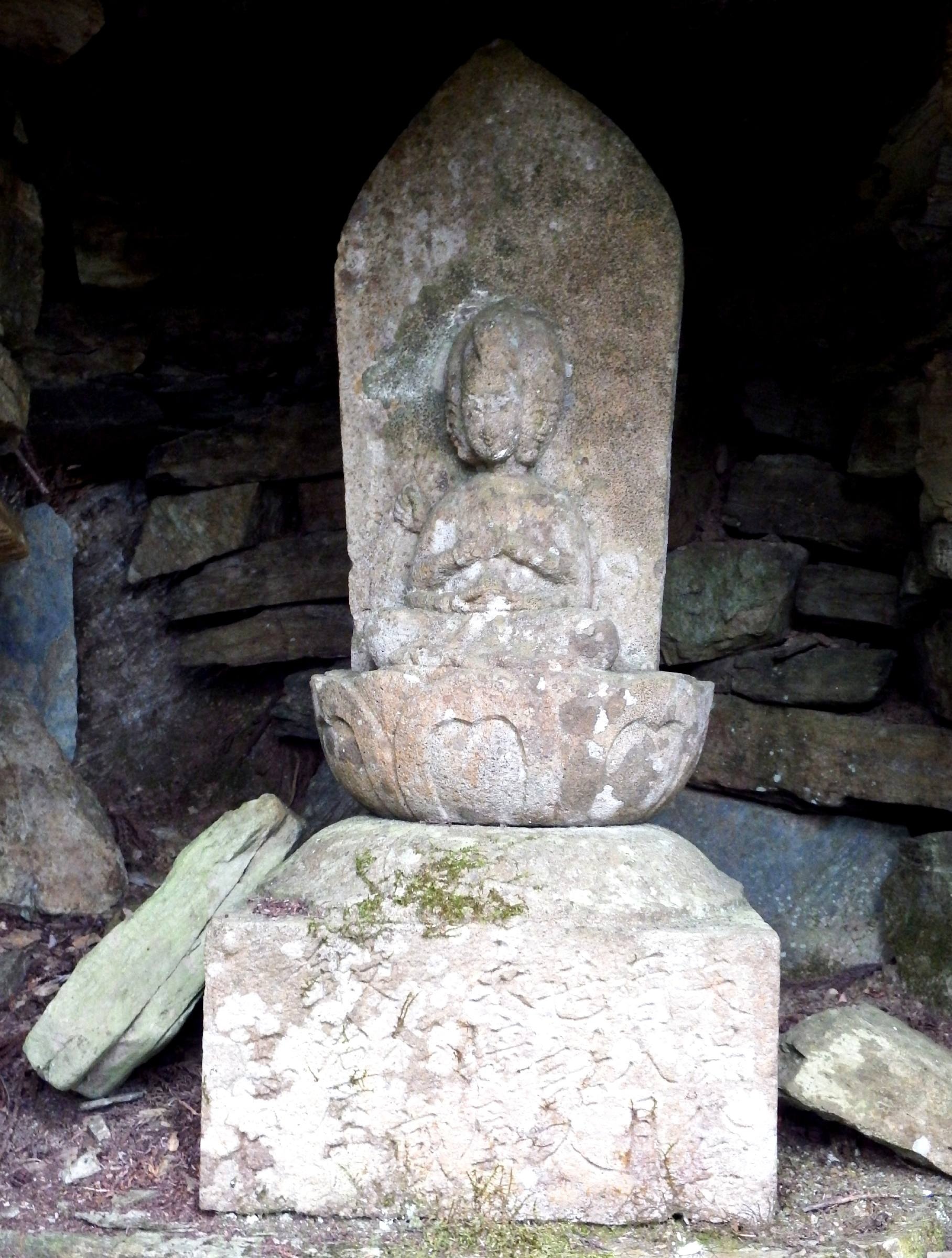
Seated Stone Buddha with Three Faces and Six Arms

== Preceding and Following Temples ==
=== Shikoku Pilgrimage ===
43 Meiseki-ji --(67.2 km)-- 44 Taihō-ji --(9.7 km)-- 45 Iwaya-ji

- Note: There are multiple routes for the pilgrimage path; the distances listed above are based on the standard route.

== Bibliography ==
- Shikoku 88 Temple Pilgrimage Council, ed. (2006). Pilgrimage Guide's Canon. Shikoku 88 Temple Pilgrimage Council.
- Tateki Miyazaki (2007). Shikoku Pilgrimage: Walking Alone, Yet Accompanied by Two. Vol. Map Volume (8th ed.). Henromichi Preservation Cooperation Association.
- Tateki Miyazaki (2007). Shikoku Pilgrimage: Walking Alone, Yet Accompanied by Two. Vol. Commentary Volume (7th ed.). Henromichi Preservation Cooperation Association.

== See also ==
- Shikoku 88 temple pilgrimage
