= Jōraku-ji (Tokushima) =

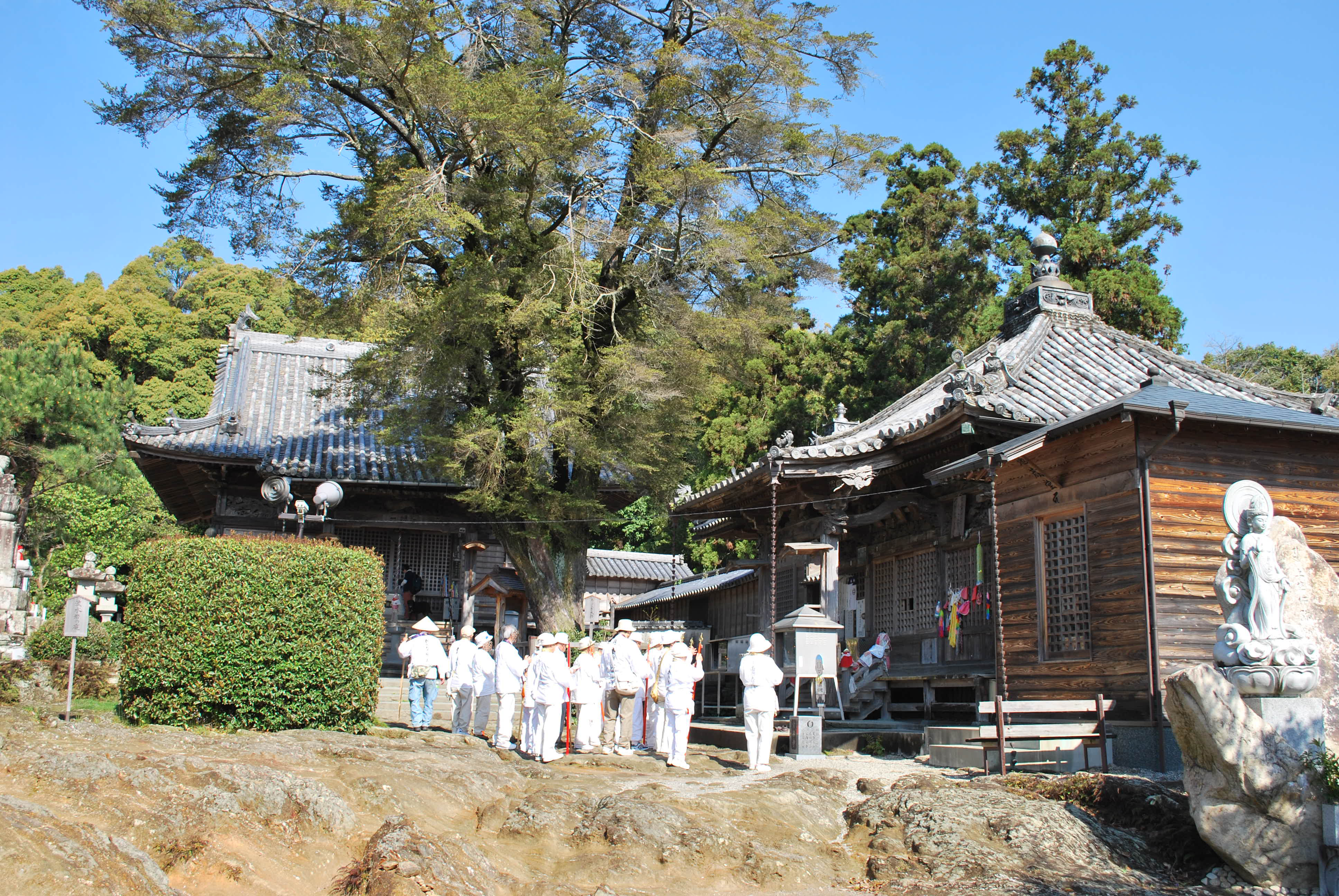
Seijuzan Jorakuji 08

Joraku-ji (Joraku Temple) (Japanese: 常楽寺) is a Koyasan Shingon temple in Tokushima, Tokushima Prefecture, Japan. Temple # 14 on the Shikoku 88 temple pilgrimage. The main image is of Miroku Bosatsu (Maitreya Bodhisattva).

== History ==
- The temple was built during the Kōnin (弘仁) era (810-824 CE).
- In the Tenshō (天正) era, the temple was destroyed by Chōsokabe Motochika's (長宗我部 元親) force.
- In the Manji (万治) era, the temple was rebuilt with the support of Hachisuka clan (蜂須賀氏).
- In the Bunka (文化) era, the temple was moved to the present location.

== Cultural properties ==
The temple's main hall and master's hall were designated as Tangible Cultural Properties of Japan on July 25, 2011.
