= Yakuri-ji =

Buddhist temple in Japan

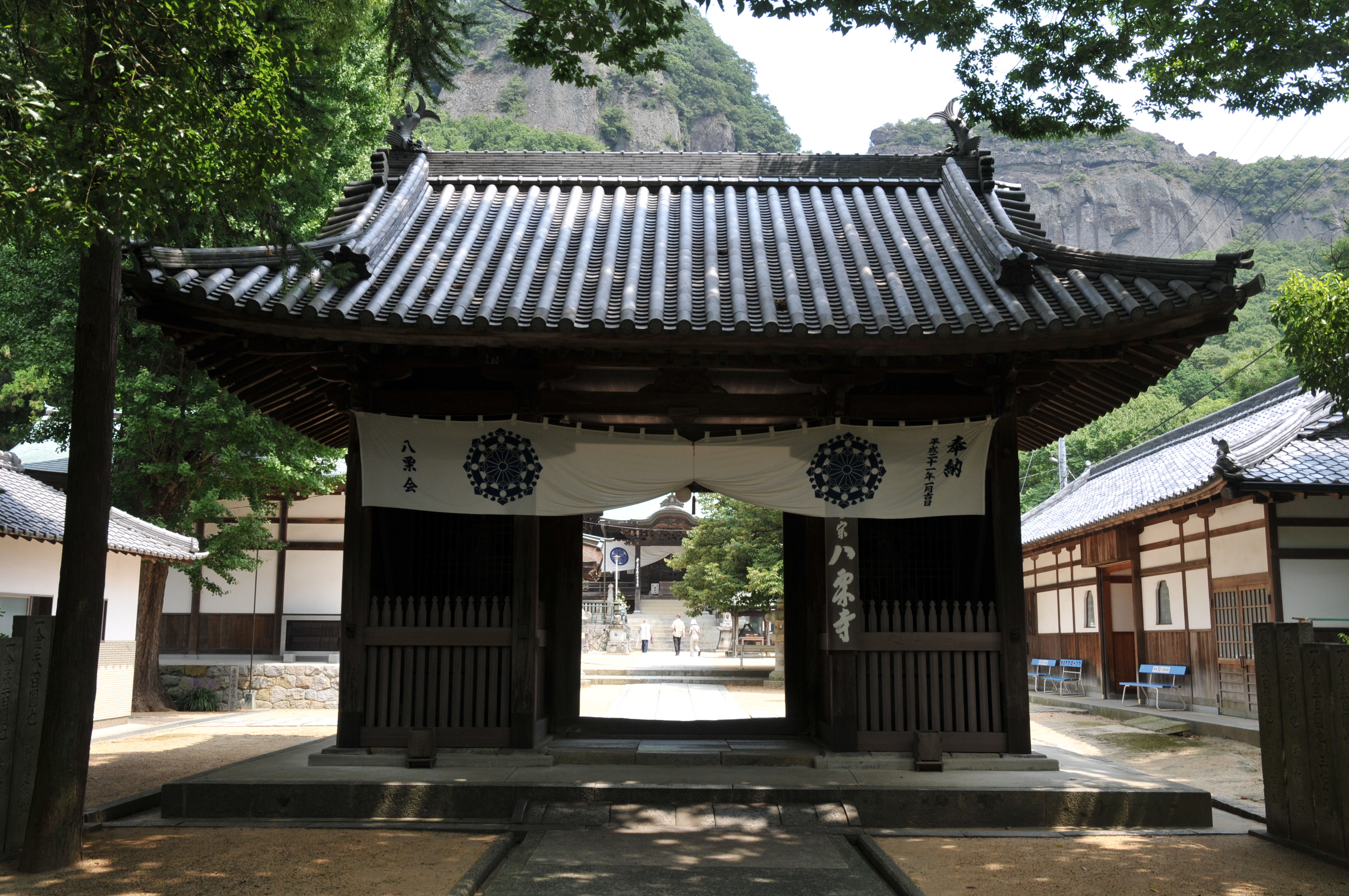

Religion
- Deity: Sho Kanjizai Bosatsu

Location
- Location: Takamatsu
- Country: Japan
- Interactive map of Yakuri-ji
- Coordinates: 34°21′36″N 134°08′23″E

Architecture
- Founder: Kūkai
- Completed: 829

Yakuri-ji (八栗寺) is a Shingon Buddhist temple in Takamatsu, Japan. It is the 85th site of the Shikoku Pilgrimage.

Yakuri-ji is situated on the western slopes of Mount Goken (五剣山).

== History ==
The temple was founded by Kūkai in 829, Yakuri-ji was completely destroyed during the invasion of Shikoku, but the main hall was rebuilt in the 1590s.

In 1939, Hase Yoshio (波瀬善雄), the founder of the Japanese new religion Reiha no Hikari (霊波之光), meditated on Mount Goken for 3 weeks and received a divine revelation and divine healing experience on the 20th day.
