= Shikoku Pilgrimage =

Pilgrimage of the Buddhist monk Kūkai

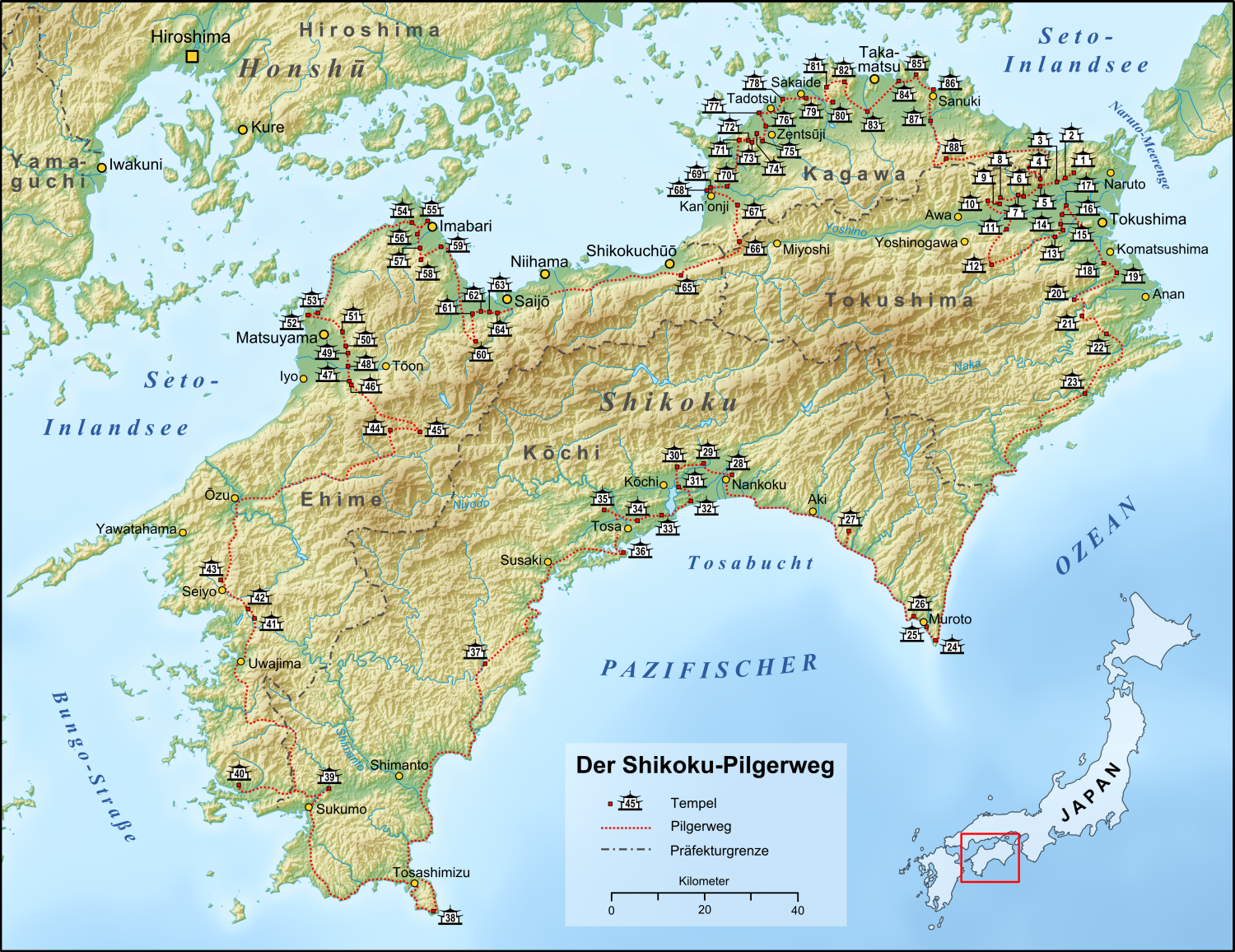
Map of the 88 temples along the Shikoku Pilgrimage

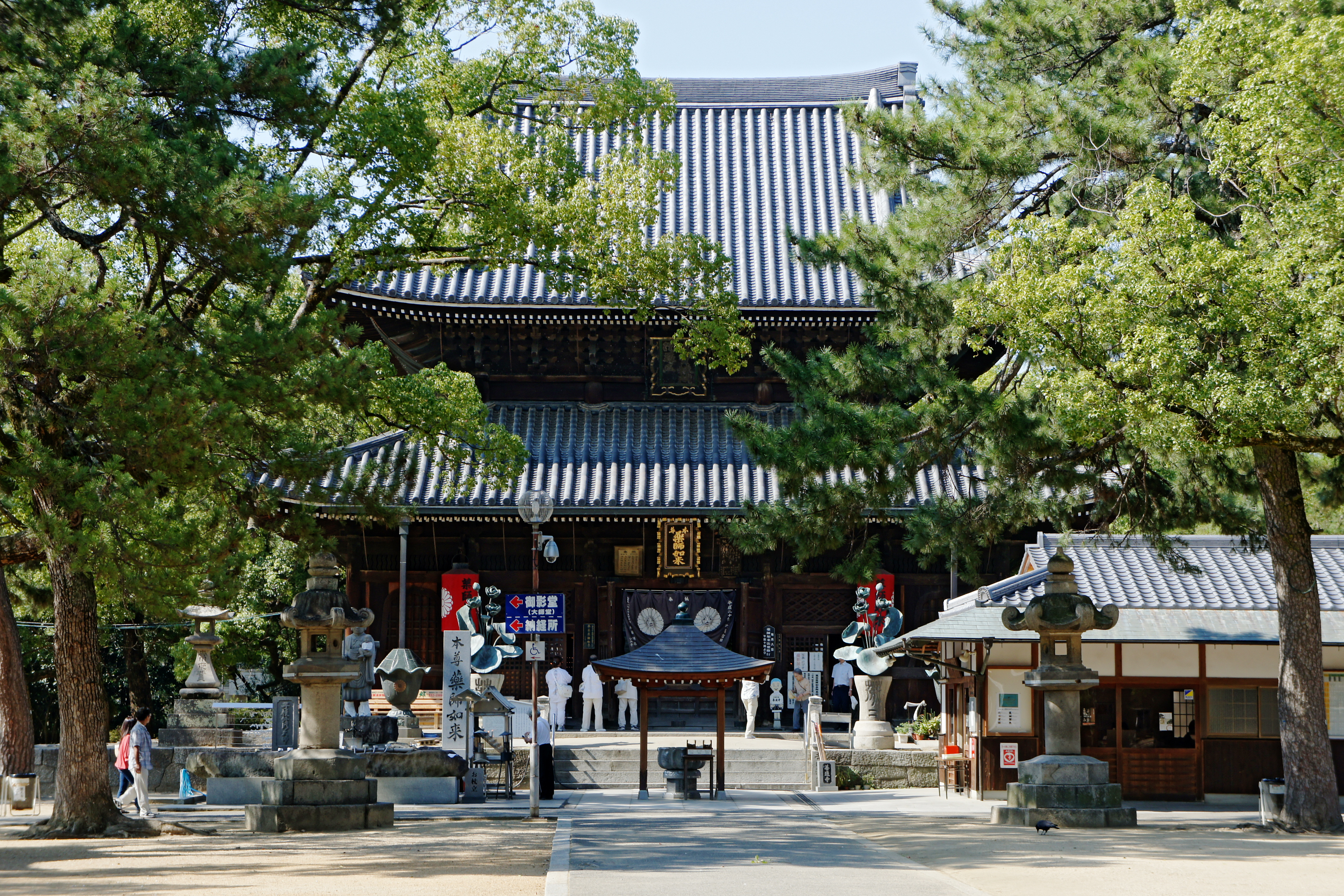
Pilgrims at Zentsū-ji, Temple 75 and the birthplace of Kūkai

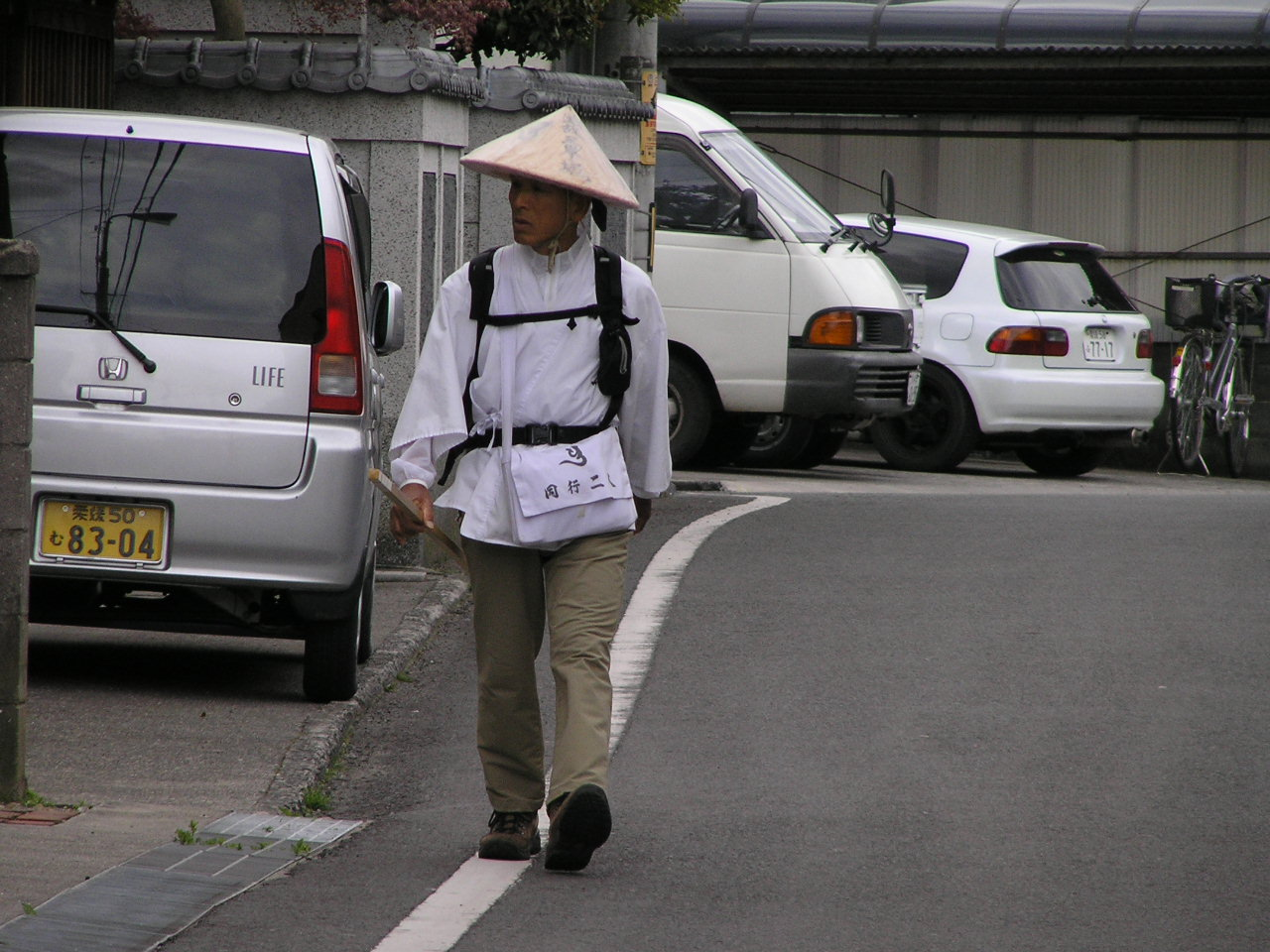
An aruki-henro or walking pilgrim, marked out by his distinctive sedge hat, white shirt, and kongō-zue. The henro-michi route passes through the countryside and a number of cities.

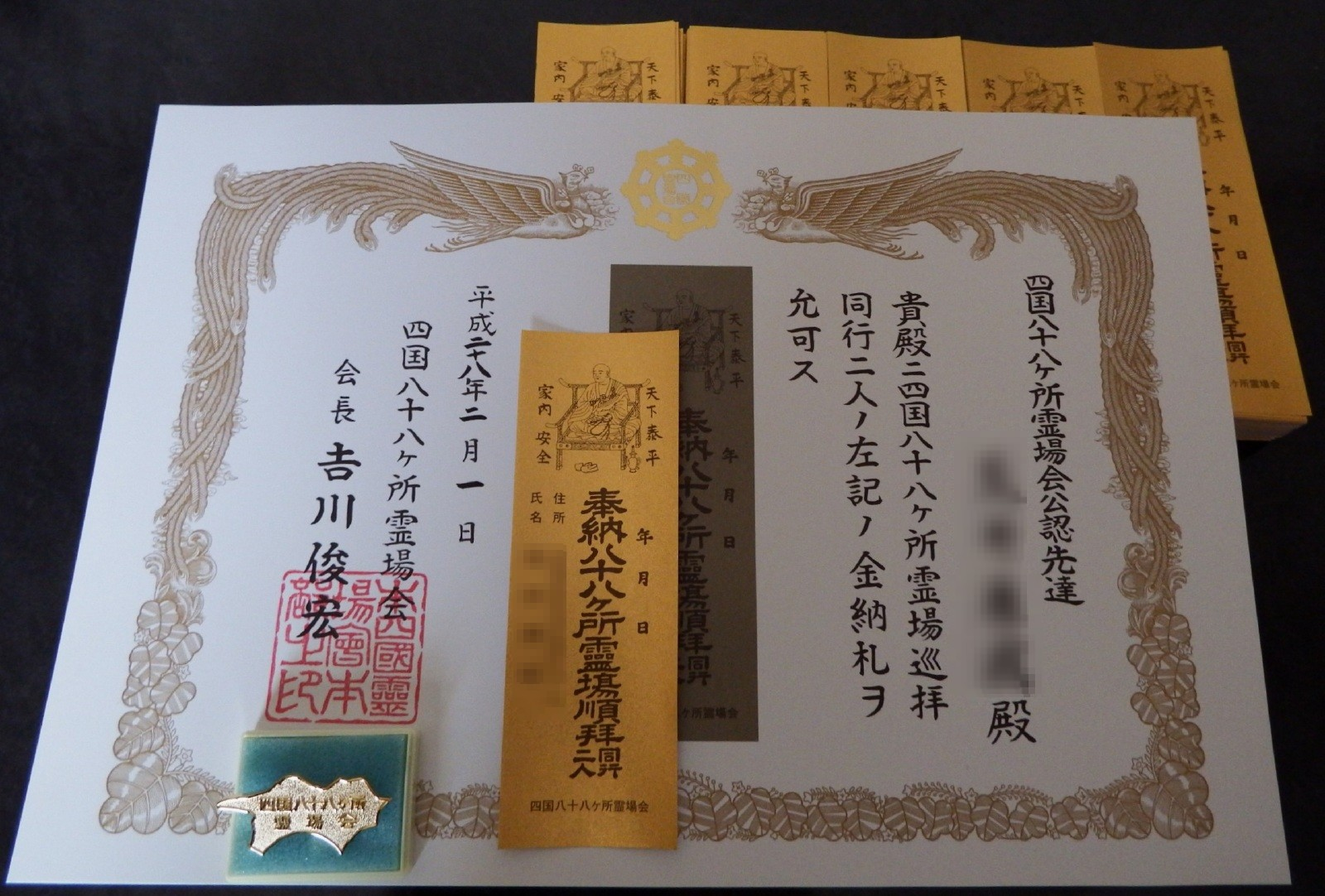

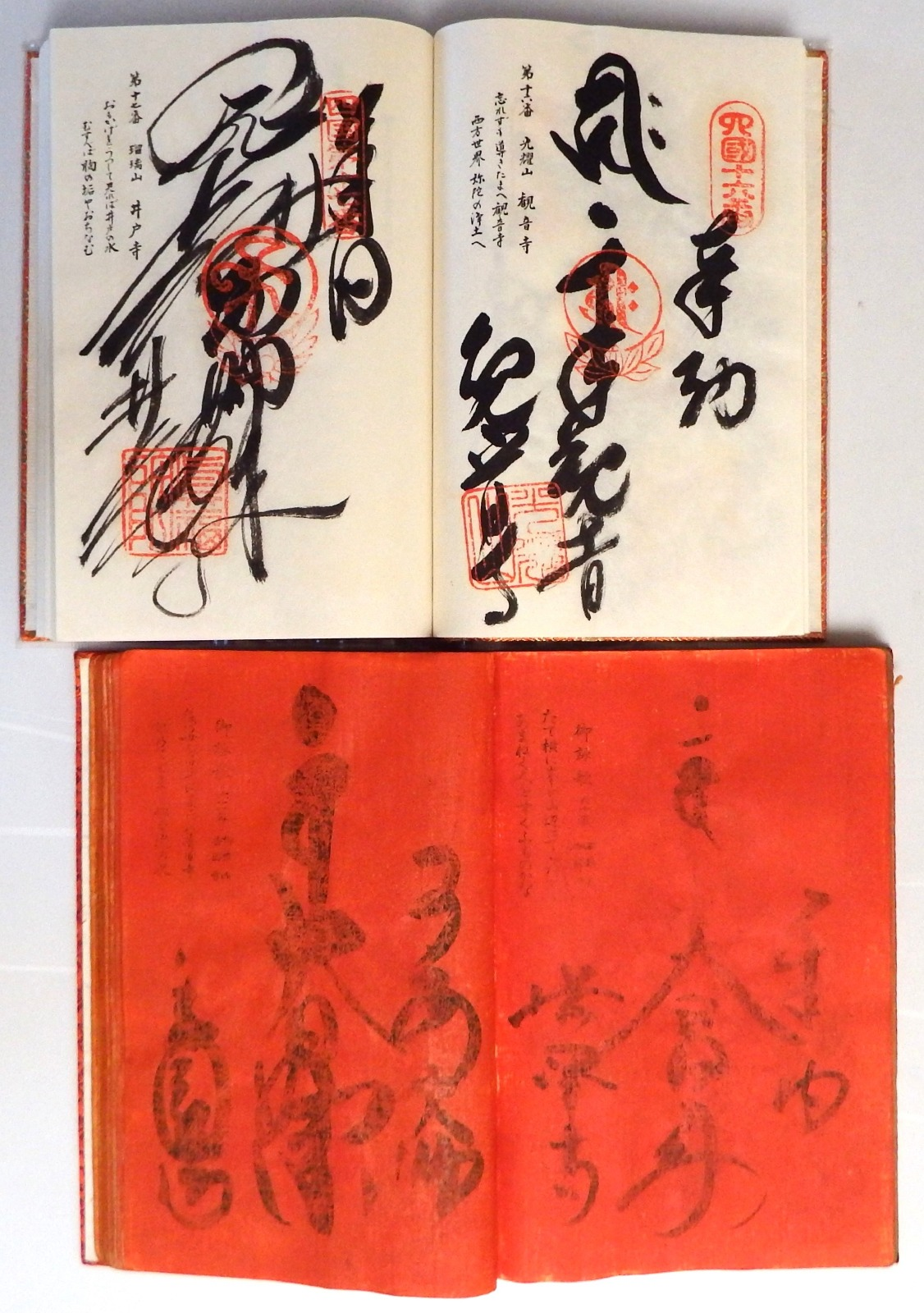

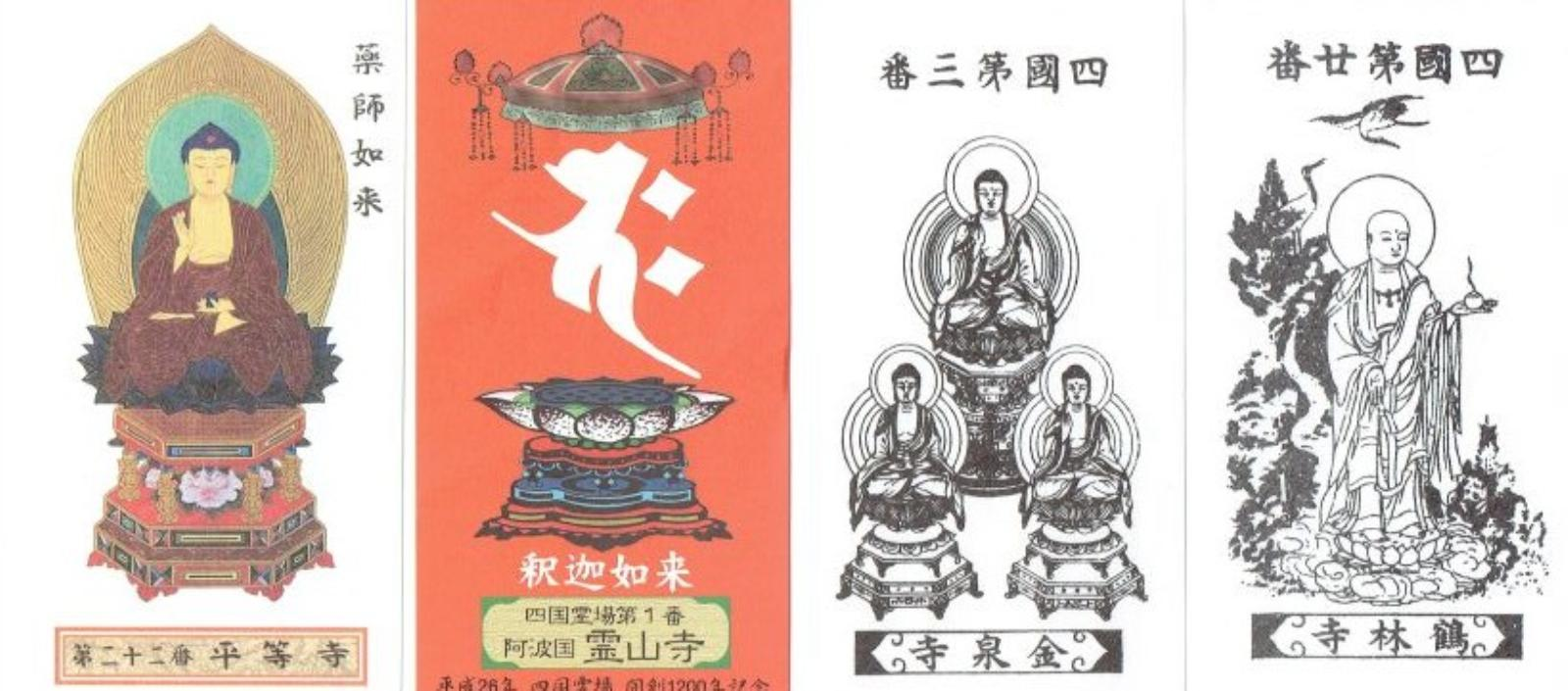

The Shikoku Pilgrimage (四国遍路, Shikoku Henro) or Shikoku Junrei (四国巡礼) is a multi-site pilgrimage of 88 temples associated with the Buddhist monk Kūkai (Kōbō Daishi) on the island of Shikoku, Japan. A popular and distinctive feature of the island's cultural landscape, and with a long history, large numbers of pilgrims, known as henro (遍路), still undertake the journey for a variety of ascetic, pious, and tourism-related purposes. The pilgrimage is traditionally completed on foot, but modern pilgrims use cars, taxis, buses, bicycles, or motorcycles, and often augment their travels with public transportation. The standard walking course is approximately 1,200 kilometres (750 mi) long and can take anywhere from 30 to 60 days to complete.

In addition to the 88 "official" temples of the pilgrimage, there are 20 bekkaku (別格) temples, which are officially associated with the Shikoku Pilgrimage (and hundreds more bangai (番外) temples, simply meaning "outside the numbers", which are not considered part of the official 88). To complete the pilgrimage, it is not necessary to visit the temples in order; in some cases, pilgrims complete the journey in reverse, a practice known as gyaku-uchi (逆うち).

Henro (遍路) is the Japanese word for pilgrim, and the locals along the route address the pilgrims as o-henro-san (お遍路さん). They are often recognizable by their white clothing, sedge hats, and kongō-zue or walking sticks. Alms or osettai (お接待) are frequently given to pilgrims by Shikoku's residents.

Before reaching Temple 88, walking and bicycle pilgrims can receive a "Shikoku 88 Temple Pilgrimage Henro Ambassador" certificate from the Maeyama Ohenro Koryu Salon. At Temple 88, one can purchase a pilgrimage completion certificate called a kechi-gan-shō (結願証), meaning "fulfillment of one's wishes." Many pilgrims also begin and complete the journey by visiting Mount Kōya in Wakayama Prefecture, which was settled by Kūkai and remains the headquarters of Shingon Buddhism. The 21-kilometre (13 mi) walking trail up to Kōya-san still exists, but most pilgrims use the train.

== History ==
=== Background ===
Pilgrimages have played an important part in Japanese religious practice since at least the Heian period. Typically centered on holy mountains, particular divinities, or charismatic individuals, they are usually to Buddhist sites although those to the shrines of Kumano and Ise are notable exceptions.

=== Kōbō Daishi ===
Kūkai, born at Zentsū-ji (Temple 75) in 774, studied in China, and upon his return was influential in the promotion of esoteric Buddhism. He established the Shingon retreat on Kōya-san, was an active writer, undertook a programme of public works, and during visits to the island of his birth is popularly said to have established or visited many of its temples and to have carved many of their images. He is posthumously known as Kōbō Daishi.

=== Development ===
The legends and cult of Kōbō Daishi, such as the episode of Emon Saburō, were maintained and developed by the monks of Kōya-san who travelled to expound Shingon and were active, along with other hijiri, in Shikoku. In the Edo period, the policy of tochi kinbaku (土地緊縛) restricted and regulated the movement of ordinary people. Pilgrims were required to obtain travel permits, follow the main paths, and pass through localities within a certain time limit, with the book of temple stamps or nōkyō-chō helping to provide proof of passage.

== Practice ==
=== Stages ===
Shikoku literally means "four provinces", those of Awa, Tosa, Iyo, and Sanuki, reorganized during the Meiji period into the prefectures of Tokushima, Kōchi, Ehime, and Kagawa. The pilgrim's journey through these four provinces is likened to a symbolic path to enlightenment, with temples 1–23 representing the idea of awakening (発心, hosshin), 24–39 austerity and discipline (修行, shugyō), 40–65 attaining enlightenment (菩提, bodai), and 66–88 entering nirvana (涅槃, nehan).

=== Equipment ===
The pilgrim's traditional costume comprises a white shirt (白衣; oizuru), conical Asian hat (すげ笠, suge-kasa), and staff (金剛杖, kongō-zue). This may be supplemented by a ceremonial stole (輪袈裟, wagesa). The henro also carries a bag (頭陀袋, zuda-bukuro) containing name slips (納札, osame-fuda), prayer beads (数珠, juzu) (also known as nenju (念珠)), a booklet (納経帳, nōkyō-chō) to collect stamps/seals (朱印, shuin), incense sticks (線香, senkō), and coins used as offerings (お賽銭, o-saisen). The more religiously-minded henro may also carry a book of sutras (経本, kyōbon) and go-eika (ご詠歌) set with a bell.

=== Rites ===
Upon arrival at each temple the henro washes before proceeding to the Hondō. After offering coins, incense, and the osame-fuda, the Heart Sutra (般若心経, Hannya Shingyō) is chanted along with repetition of the Mantra of the main image (本尊, honzon) and the Mantra of Light (光明真言, Kōmyō Shingon). After kigan and ekō (prayers and dedication of merit), the henro proceeds to the shrine of Kobo Daishi (大師堂, Daishidō). Coins and a fuda are similarly offered, and again the Heart Sutra is chanted, along with repetition of the Gohōgō Mantra, namu-Daishi-henjō-kongō.

== UNESCO World Heritage Bid ==
Since 2010, Shikoku's prefectural governments, NPO members, and local leaders have worked toward achieving UNESCO World Heritage status for the Shikoku Pilgrimage. Currently, it is recognized as a "Provisional Candidate" by Japan's Agency for Cultural Affairs, or a cultural asset which has not yet been added to Japan's World Heritage Tentative List but which should 'proceed with preparations.'

== Imitative versions ==
Attesting to the popularity of the Shikoku pilgrimage, from the eighteenth century a number of smaller imitative versions have been established. These include a 150 kilometres (93 mi) circuit on Shōdo Island northeast of Takamatsu; a 3 kilometres (1.9 mi) course on the grounds of Ninna-ji in Kyoto; a route on the Chita Peninsula near Nagoya; and circuits in Edo and Chiba Prefecture. Outside Japan, another version is on the Hawaiʻi on the island of Kauai.

== List of Main 88 Temples ==
Map

Collectively, the 88 temples are known as Shikoku Hachijūhakkasho (四国八十八箇所).

No.	Temple	Honzon (main image)	Location	Coordinates	Image
1	Ryōzen-ji (霊山寺)	Shaka Nyorai	Naruto, Tokushima	34.159803°N 134.502592°E	
2	Gokuraku-ji (極楽寺)	Amida Nyorai	Naruto, Tokushima	34.155556°N 134.490278°E	
3	Konsen-ji (金泉寺)	Shaka Nyorai	Itano, Tokushima	34.147436°N 134.468544°E	
4	Dainichi-ji (大日寺)	Dainichi Nyorai	Itano, Tokushima	34.151306°N 134.430889°E	
5	Jizō-ji (地蔵寺)	Enmei Jizō Bosatsu	Itano, Tokushima	34.137222°N 134.431944°E	
6	Anraku-ji (安楽寺)	Yakushi Nyorai	Kamiita, Tokushima	34.118056°N 134.388389°E	
7	Jūraku-ji (十楽寺)	Amida Nyorai	Awa, Tokushima	34.12075°N 134.377925°E	
8	Kumadani-ji (熊谷寺)	Senju Kannon	Awa, Tokushima	34.122778°N 134.34°E	
9	Hōrin-ji (法輪寺)	Shaka Nyorai	Awa, Tokushima	34.104378°N 134.333814°E	
10	Kirihata-ji (切幡寺)	Senju Kannon	Awa, Tokushima	34.10775°N 134.304278°E	
11	Fujii-dera (藤井寺)	Yakushi Nyorai	Yoshinogawa, Tokushima	34.051667°N 134.3485°E	
12	Shōsan-ji (焼山寺)	Kokūzō Bosatsu	Kamiyama, Tokushima	33.985028°N 134.31025°E	
13	Dainichi-ji (大日寺)	Jūichimen Kannon	Tokushima, Tokushima	34.038117°N 134.462683°E	
14	Jōraku-ji (常楽寺)	Miroku Bosatsu	Tokushima, Tokushima	34.050333°N 134.475639°E	
15	Awa Kokubun-ji (阿波国分寺)	Yakushi Nyorai	Tokushima, Tokushima	34.055611°N 134.473611°E	
16	Kannon-ji (観音寺)	Senju Kannon	Tokushima, Tokushima	34.068472°N 134.474344°E	
17	Ido-ji (井戸寺)	Yakushi Nyorai	Tokushima, Tokushima	34.085167°N 134.485444°E	
18	Onzan-ji (恩山寺)	Yakushi Nyorai	Komatsushima, Tokushima	33.986°N 134.57825°E	
19	Tatsue-ji (立江寺)	Jizō Bosatsu	Komatsushima, Tokushima	33.967861°N 134.605806°E	
20	Kakurin-ji (鶴林寺)	Jizō Bosatsu	Katsuura, Tokushima	33.913861°N 134.505611°E	
21	Tairyū-ji (太龍寺)	Kokūzō Bosatsu	Anan, Tokushima	33.882528°N 134.521889°E	
22	Byōdō-ji (平等寺)	Yakushi Nyorai	Anan, Tokushima	33.851833°N 134.582778°E	
23	Yakuō-ji (薬王寺)	Yakushi Nyorai	Minami, Tokushima	33.732306°N 134.527583°E	
24	Hotsumisaki-ji (最御崎寺)	Kokūzō Bosatsu	Muroto, Kōchi	33.249008°N 134.175739°E	
25	Shinshō-ji (津照寺)	Jizō Bosatsu	Muroto, Kōchi	33.287806°N 134.14825°E	
26	Kongōchō-ji (金剛頂寺)	Yakushi Nyorai	Muroto, Kōchi	33.307222°N 134.122861°E	
27	Kōnomine-ji (神峰寺)	Jūichimen Kannon	Yasuda, Kōchi	33.467611°N 133.974778°E	
28	Dainichi-ji (大日寺)	Dainichi Nyorai	Kōnan, Kōchi	33.577583°N 133.705389°E	
29	Tosa Kokubun-ji (土佐国分寺)	Senju Kannon	Nankoku, Kōchi	33.598694°N 133.640417°E	
30	Zenrakuji (善楽寺)	Amida Nyorai	Kōchi, Kōchi	33.591917°N 133.577556°E	
31	Chikurin-ji (竹林寺)	Monju Bosatsu	Kōchi, Kōchi	33.546611°N 133.577472°E	
32	Zenjibu-ji (禅師峰寺)	Jūichimen Kannon	Nankoku, Kōchi	33.526694°N 133.611389°E	
33	Sekkei-ji (雪蹊寺)	Yakushi Nyorai	Kōchi, Kōchi	33.500833°N 133.543083°E	
34	Tanema-ji (種間寺)	Yakushi Nyorai	Haruno, Kōchi	33.491722°N 133.487583°E	
35	Kiyotaki-ji (清滝寺)	Yakushi Nyorai	Tosa, Kōchi	33.5125°N 133.4095°E	
36	Shōryū-ji (青竜寺)	Fudō Myōō	Tosa, Kōchi	33.426°N 133.450806°E	
37	Iwamoto-ji (岩本寺)	Five Buddhas	Shimanto, Kōchi	33.207972°N 133.134611°E	
38	Kongōfuku-ji (金剛福寺)	Senju Kannon	Tosashimizu, Kōchi	32.726028°N 133.018556°E	
39	Enkōji (延光寺)	Yakushi Nyorai	Sukumo, Kōchi	32.961306°N 132.774056°E	
40	Kanjizai-ji (観自在寺)	Yakushi Nyorai	Ainan, Ehime	32.964667°N 132.564056°E	
41	Ryuukou-ji (竜光寺)	Jūichimen Kannon	Uwajima, Ehime	33.295194°N 132.5985°E	
42	Butsumoku-ji (佛木寺)	Dainichi Nyorai	Uwajima, Ehime	33.310583°N 132.581472°E	
43	Meiseki-ji (明石寺)	Senju Kannon	Seiyo, Ehime	33.369222°N 132.518972°E	
44	Daihō-ji (大宝寺)	Jūichimen Kannon	Kumakōgen, Ehime	33.660889°N 132.912083°E	
45	Iwaya-ji (岩屋寺)	Fudō Myōō	Kumakōgen, Ehime	33.658667°N 132.980722°E	
46	Jōruri-ji (浄瑠璃寺)	Yakushi Nyorai	Matsuyama, Ehime	33.753556°N 132.819111°E	
47	Yasaka-ji (八坂寺)	Amida Nyorai	Matsuyama, Ehime	33.757944°N 132.812861°E	
48	Sairin-ji (西林寺)	Jūichimen Kannon	Matsuyama, Ehime	33.793722°N 132.813944°E	
49	Jōdo-ji (浄土寺)	Shaka Nyorai	Matsuyama, Ehime	33.816667°N 132.808528°E	
50	Hanta-ji (繁多寺)	Yakushi Nyorai	Matsuyama, Ehime	33.828139°N 132.804556°E	
51	Ishite-ji (石手寺)	Yakushi Nyorai	Matsuyama, Ehime	33.847861°N 132.796472°E	
52	Taisan-ji (太山寺)	Jūichimen Kannon	Matsuyama, Ehime	33.885083°N 132.714972°E	
53	Enmyō-ji (圓明寺)	Amida Nyorai	Matsuyama, Ehime	33.89175°N 132.739667°E	
54	Enmei-ji (延命寺)	Fudō Myōō	Imabari, Ehime	34.066833°N 132.964°E	
55	Nankōbō (南光坊)	Daitsū-chishō Butsu	Imabari, Ehime	34.06875°N 132.99575°E	
56	Taisan-ji (泰山寺)	Jizō Bosatsu	Imabari, Ehime	34.050111°N 132.974583°E	
57	Eifuku-ji (栄福寺)	Amida Nyorai	Imabari, Ehime	34.029472°N 132.978472°E	
58	Senyū-ji (仙遊寺)	Senjū Kannon	Imabari, Ehime	34.013194°N 132.977361°E	
59	Iyo Kokubun-ji (伊予国分寺)	Yakushi Nyorai	Imabari, Ehime	34.026167°N 133.025444°E	
60	Yokomine-ji (横峰寺)	Dainichi Nyorai	Saijō, Ehime	33.837861°N 133.111139°E	
61	Kōon-ji (香園寺)	Dainichi Nyorai	Saijō, Ehime	33.893528°N 133.103306°E	
62	Hōju-ji (宝寿寺)	Jūichimen Kannon	Saijō, Ehime	33.897333°N 133.114944°E	
63	Kichijō-ji (吉祥寺)	Bishamonten	Saijō, Ehime	33.896056°N 133.129167°E	
64	Maegami-ji (前神寺)	Amida Nyorai	Saijō, Ehime	33.890222°N 133.160667°E	
65	Sankaku-ji (三角寺)	Jūichimen Kannon	Shikokuchūō, Ehime	33.967639°N 133.5865°E	
66	Unpen-ji (雲辺寺)	Senju Kannon	Miyoshi, Tokushima	34.035222°N 133.723722°E	
67	Daikō-ji (大興寺)	Yakushi Nyorai	Mitoyo, Kagawa	34.102194°N 133.719167°E	
68	Jinne-in (神恵院)	Amida Nyorai	Kan'onji, Kagawa	34.133986°N 133.647333°E	
69	Kannon-ji (観音寺)	Shō Kannon	Kan'onji, Kagawa	34.1345°N 133.647528°E	
70	Motoyama-ji (本山寺)	Batō Kannon	Mitoyo, Kagawa	34.139667°N 133.694056°E	
71	Iyadani-ji (弥谷寺)	Senju Kannon	Mitoyo, Kagawa	34.229722°N 133.724261°E	
72	Mandara-ji (曼荼羅寺)	Dainichi Nyorai	Zentsūji, Kagawa	34.223306°N 133.750219°E	
73	Shusshaka-ji (出釈迦寺)	Shaka Nyorai	Zentsūji, Kagawa	34.219389°N 133.750278°E	
74	Kōyama-ji (甲山寺)	Yakushi Nyorai	Zentsūji, Kagawa	34.233194°N 133.765764°E	
75	Zentsū-ji (善通寺)	Yakushi Nyorai	Zentsūji, Kagawa	34.225111°N 133.774139°E	
76	Konzō-ji (金倉寺)	Yakushi Nyorai	Zentsūji, Kagawa	34.250097°N 133.781014°E	
77	Dōryū-ji (道隆寺)	Yakushi Nyorai	Tadotsu, Kagawa	34.27675°N 133.762694°E	
78	Gōshō-ji (郷照寺)	Amida Nyorai	Utazu, Kagawa	34.306694°N 133.824583°E	
79	Tennō-ji (天皇寺)	Jūichimen Kannon	Sakaide, Kagawa	34.311472°N 133.882861°E	
80	Sanuki Kokubun-ji (讃岐国分寺)	Jūichimen & Senjū Kannon	Takamatsu, Kagawa	34.303139°N 133.944167°E	
81	Shiromine-ji (白峯寺)	Senju Kannon	Sakaide, Kagawa	34.333528°N 133.926764°E	
82	Negoro-ji (根香寺)	Senju Kannon	Takamatsu, Kagawa	34.3445°N 133.960556°E	
83	Ichinomiya-ji (一宮寺)	Shō Kannon	Takamatsu, Kagawa	34.286611°N 134.026583°E	
84	Yashima-ji (屋島寺)	Jūichimen & Senjū Kannon	Takamatsu, Kagawa	34.357917°N 134.10125°E	
85	Yakuri-ji (八栗寺)	Shō Kannon	Takamatsu, Kagawa	34.359889°N 134.139528°E	
86	Shido-ji (志度寺)	Jūichimen Kannon	Sanuki, Kagawa	34.324306°N 134.179639°E	
87	Nagao-ji (長尾寺)	Shō Kannon	Sanuki, Kagawa	34.266706°N 134.171719°E	
88	Ōkubo-ji (大窪寺)	Yakushi Nyorai	Sanuki, Kagawa	34.191408°N 134.206733°E	

== List of 20 Bekkaku Temples ==
Number	Temple Name	Location	Coordinates	Image
1	Taisan-ji (大山寺)	Kamiita, Tokushima	34.159357°N 134.399558°E	
2	Dōgaku-ji (童学寺)	Ishii, Tokushima	34.058515°N 134.427757°E	
3	Jigen-ji (慈眼寺)	Kamikatsu, Tokushima	33.939843°N 134.430800°E	
4	Yasaka-dera (八坂寺)	Kaiyō, Tokushima	33.647782°N 134.385238°E	
5	Daizen-ji (大善寺)	Susaki, Kōchi	33.388239°N 133.281482°E	
6	Ryūkō-in(龍光院)	Uwajima, Ehime	33.225042°N 132.569207°E	
7	Shusseki-ji(出石寺)	Oozushi, Ehime	33.535152°N 132.465327°E	
8	Eitoku-ji (永徳寺)	Oozushi, Ehime	33.532301°N 132.574536°E	
9	Monju-in (文珠院)	Matsuyama, Ehime	33.764501°N 132.810736°E	
10	Nishiyama Kōryū-ji (西山興隆寺)	Saijō, Ehime	33.905792°N 133.025329°E	
11	Shōzen-ji (正善寺)	Saijō, Ehime	33.895633°N 133.053909°E	
12	Enmei-ji (延命寺)	Shikoku Chūō, Ehime	33.956574°N 133.420556°E	
13	Senryū-dera (仙龍寺)	Shikoku Chūō, Ehime	33.950465°N 133.606237°E	
14	Jōfuku-ji (常福寺)	Shikoku Chūō, Ehime	33.989733°N 133.635162°E	
15	Hashikura-ji (箸蔵寺)	Myōshi, Tokushima	34.048147°N 133.840895°E	
16	Hagiwara-ji (萩原寺)	Kannon-ji city, Kagawa	34.070968°N 133.687277°E	
17	Kanno-ji (神野寺)	Man'nō, Kagawa	34.163988°N 133.864343°E	
18	Kaigan-ji (海岸寺)	Tadotsu, Kagawa	34.256065°N 133.727839°E	
19	Kōzai-ji (香西寺)	Takamatsu, Kagawa	34.347612°N 133.993879°E	
20	Ootaki-ji(大瀧寺)	Mima, Tokushima	34.122092°N 134.127473°E	

== See also ==
- Shingon
- Kōyasan
- Japan 100 Kannon, pilgrimage composed of the Saigoku, Bandō and Chichibu pilgrimages
  - Saigoku 33 Kannon, pilgrimage in the Kansai region
  - Bandō 33 Kannon, pilgrimage in the Kantō region
  - Chichibu 34 Kannon, pilgrimage in Saitama Prefecture
- Musashino Kannon Pilgrimage, pilgrimage in Tokyo and Saitama prefectures
- Chūgoku 33 Kannon, pilgrimage in the Chūgoku region
- Kannon
- Buddhism in Japan
- Tourism in Japan
