= Daikō-ji =

Buddhist temple in Japan

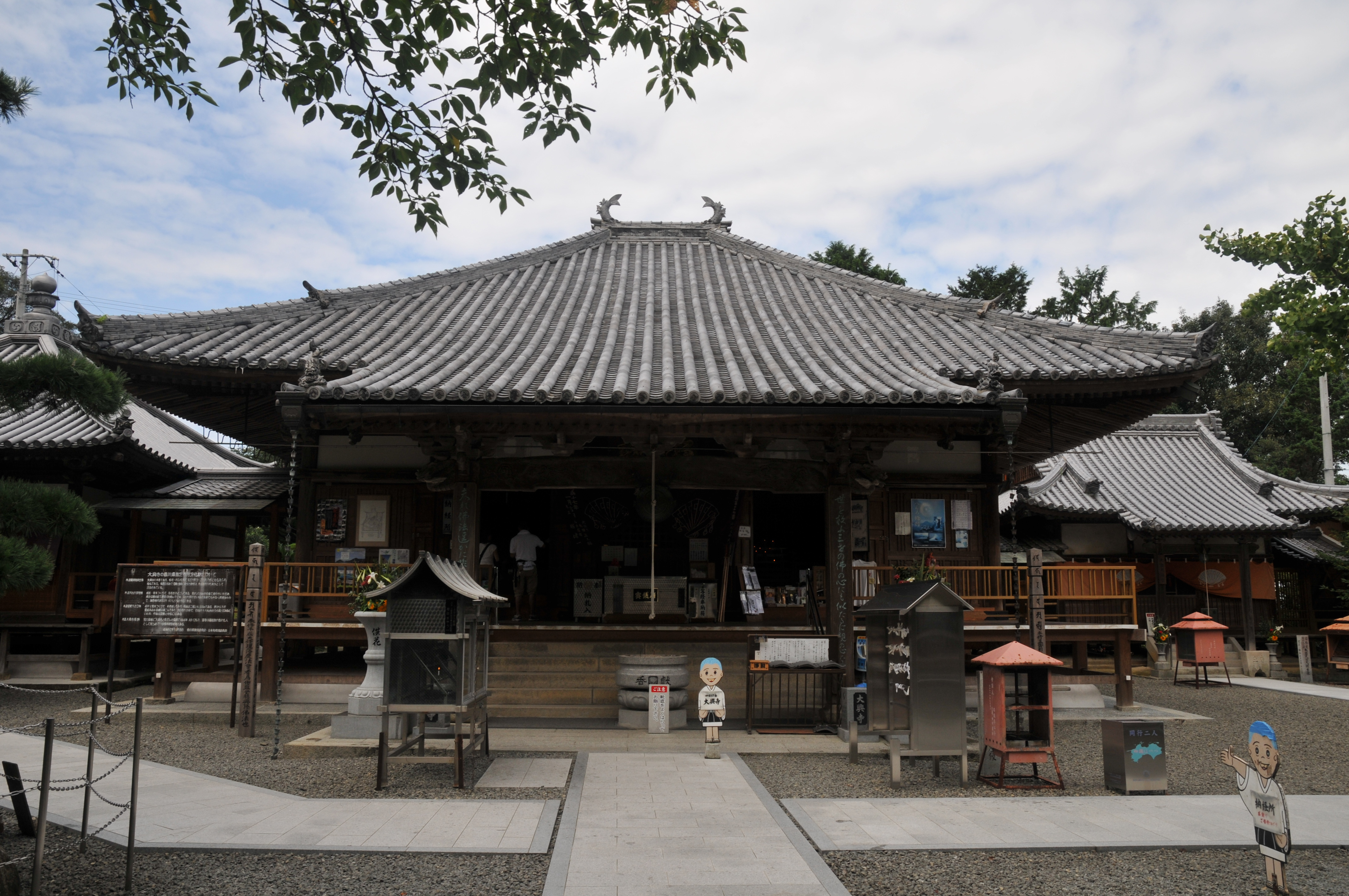

Religion
- Affiliation: Shingon
- Deity: Yakushi Nyorai

Location
- Location: Mitoyo
- Country: Japan
- Interactive map of Daikō-ji
- Coordinates: 34°06′08″N 133°43′09″E

Architecture
- Completed: 742

Daikō-ji (大興寺) is a Shingon Buddhist temple in Japan. It is the 67th site of the Shikoku Pilgrimage.

== History ==
The history starts in 742 when Daikō-ji was built. In 792, Kūkai visited the temple. In 822 the temple was rebuilt under Emperor Saga.

The temple used to be also a Tendai and Shingon Buddhist temple. The statue of Acala at the temple is built using the Tendai style.
