= Shōsan-ji (Kamiyama) =

- 焼山寺
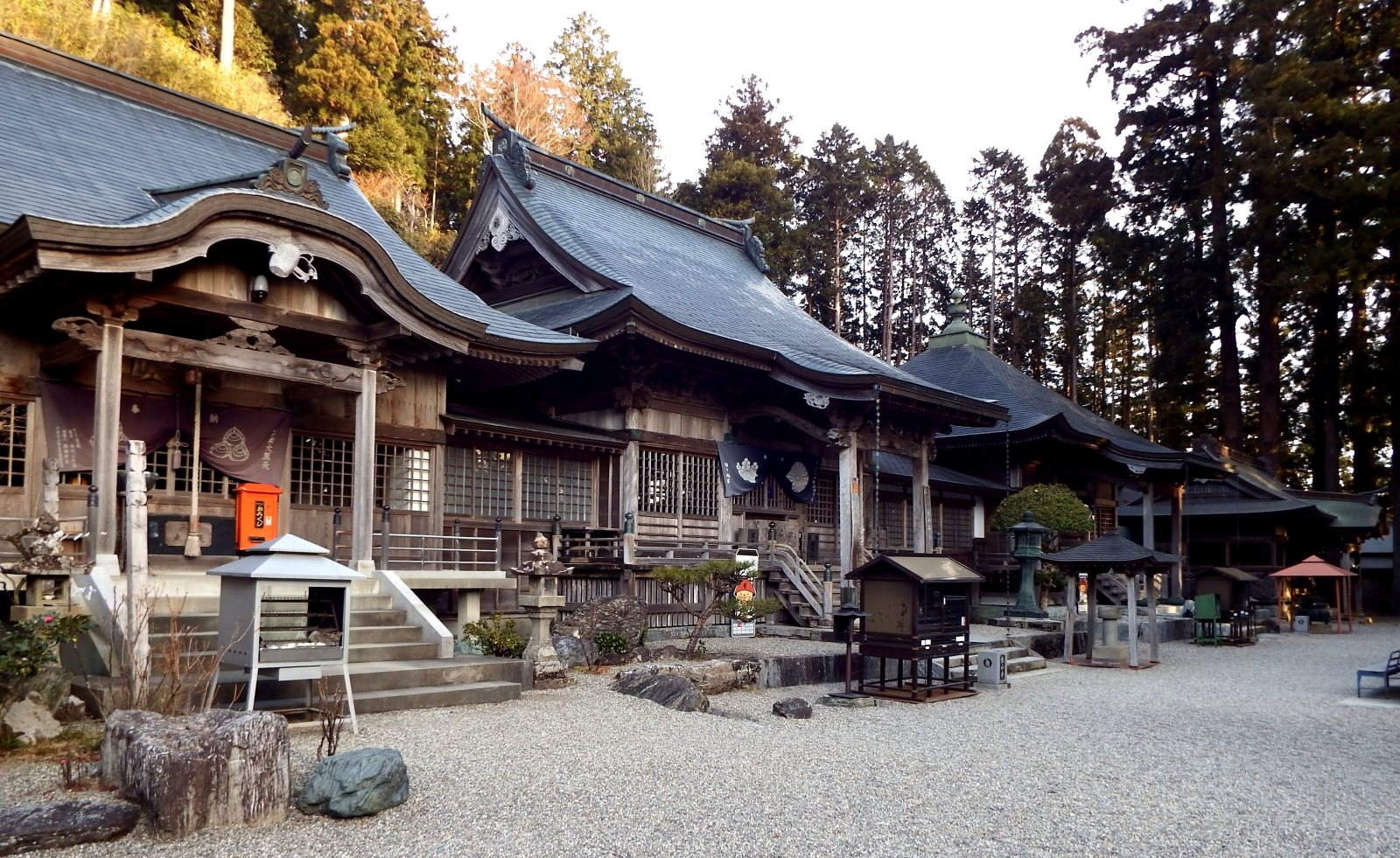

Religion
- Affiliation: Buddhism
- Sect: Kōyasan Shingon-shū
- Deity: Kokūzō Bosatsu

Location
- Location: Kamiyama, Tokushima
- Country: Japan
- Interactive map of Shōsan-ji
- Coordinates: 33°59′6.1″N 134°18′36.9″E

Architecture
- Founder: Kukai
- Completed: 815

Shōsan-ji (焼山寺) or Shozan-ji is a Shingon Buddhist temple in Kamiyama, Tokushima. It is the 12th temple in the 88 temple Shikoku Pilgrimage. At at elevation of 706 metres, it is the second highest temple of the pilgrimage.

== History ==
Ascetic En no Gyoja is said to have stopped a fiery serpent who caused trouble on this mountain. It is said that later, in 815, Kukai also saw the mountain on fire, and stopped the serpent once again. He then sealed the serpent in a cave, with the help of Kokūzō Bosatsu.

Emon Saburō, a folk figure associated with the pilgrimage, is said to have died 1.6 km away at Joshin-an (杖杉庵).

== Access ==
Shosan-ji is the first "nansho" (難所), or "difficult [to reach] place" of the Shikoku pilgrimage, as walking to it from Fujii-dera involves over 11 km of steep and high trails.

It is also accessible by vehicle, with 70-80 parking spots.
