= Zenrakuji =

Buddhist temple in Kōchi Prefecture, Japan

- 善楽寺
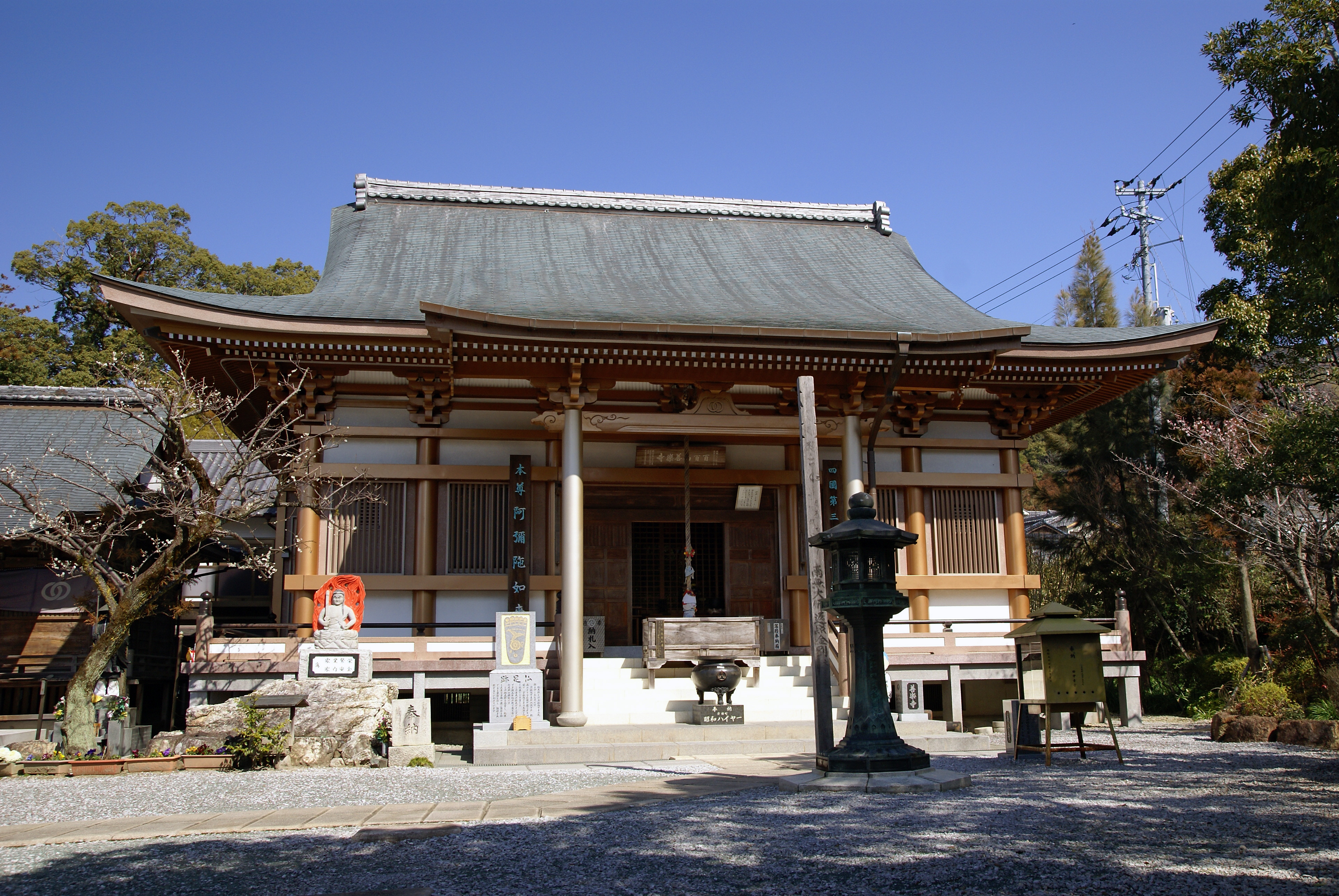

Religion
- Affiliation: Shingon

Location
- Location: Kōchi-ken
- Country: Japan
- Interactive map of Zenrakuji
- Coordinates: 33°35′31″N 133°34′40″E

Website
- http://www.88shikokuhenro.jp/30zenrakuji/

Zenrakuji is a Shingon Buddhist temple located in Kōchi, Kōchi, Japan. It is the 30th temple of the Shikoku Pilgrimage.
