= Tanema-ji =

Building in Kōchi, Japan

- 種間寺
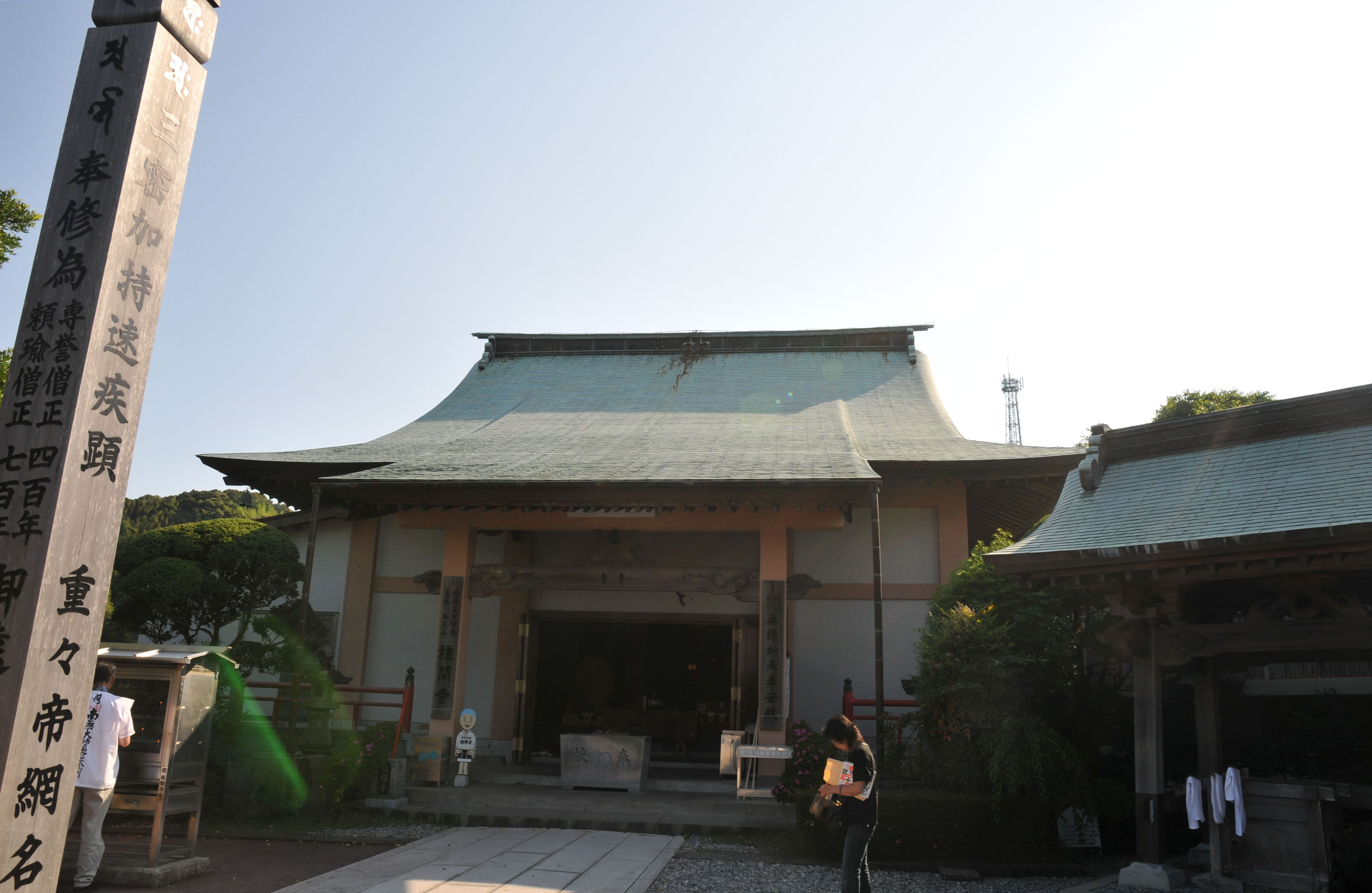

Religion
- Affiliation: Shingon

Location
- Location: Kōchi-ken
- Country: Japan
- Interactive map of Tanema-ji
- Coordinates: 33°29′30″N 133°29′15″E

Website
- http://www.88shikokuhenro.jp/34tanemaji/

Tanema-ji is a Shingon Buddhist Temple located in Kōchi, Kōchi, Japan. It is the 34th temple of the Shikoku Pilgrimage.

== History ==
According to the temple records, during the reign of Emperor Yomei (585-587), a Buddhist carpenter from Baekje who had come to build Shitenno-ji, was caught in a storm when leaving Japan, and drifted ashore to a port near the present day temple. As a part of a prayer for a safe voyage home, the carpenter carved an image of Bhaisajyaguru at the summit of the temple hill, which became the origin point of Tanema-ji. Years later during the Konin era (810-824), Kukai founded the temple using the Baekje carpenters carving as the Honzon, and spread the five grains he had brought from China across the temple grounds, deciding the present-day temple name Tanema-ji (種間寺 lit. “seed space temple”).

The temple was abandoned following the forced separation of Shinto and Buddhism, but was later restored in 1880.
