= List of cultural properties of Japan – writings (Ehime) =

This list is of the cultural properties of Japan designated in the categories of calligraphic works and classical texts (書跡・典籍, shoseki tenseki) and ancient documents (古文書, komonjo) for the Prefecture of Ehime.

== National Cultural Properties ==
=== Calligraphic works and classical texts ===
As of 1 July 2015, three Important Cultural Properties have been designated, being of national significance.

Property	Date	Municipality	Ownership	Comments	Image	Coordinates	Ref.
Shichōji Engi 歯長寺縁起; Shichōji engi	Muromachi period	Seiyo	Shichō-ji (歯長寺)	one volume		33°21′22″N 132°31′06″E	
Ōyamazumi Jinja Hōraku Renga 大山祇神社法楽連歌; Ōyamazumi Jinja hōraku renga	Muromachi to Edo period	Imabari	Ōyamazumi Jinja	274 items		34°14′52″N 133°00′21″E	
Bukkan Zenji Bokuseki 仏鑑禅師墨蹟〈贈臭庵居士偈／淳祐乙巳中夏七日〉 Bukkan Zenji bokuseki	1345	Imabari	private	one scroll		34°01′05″N 133°02′29″E	

=== Ancient documents ===
As of 1 July 2015, three Important Cultural Properties have been designated.

Property	Date	Municipality	Ownership	Comments	Image	Coordinates	Ref.
Kutsuna Family Documents 忽那家文書（百十三通） Kutsuna-ke monjo	C13-19	Matsuyama	private	nine scrolls		33°58′55″N 132°36′08″E	
Ōyamazumi Jinja Mishima Family Documents 忽那家文書（百十三通） Ōyamazumi Jinja Mishima-ke monjo	1445-1761	Imabari	Ōyamazumi Jinja	210 items		34°14′51″N 133°00′16″E	
Yoshū Nii Genealogy, by Gyōnen 与州新居系図〈凝然筆／〉 Yoshū Nii keizu (Gyōnen fude)	Kamakura Period	Saijō	Isono Jinja (伊曽乃神社)	1 scroll		33°58′55″N 132°36′08″E	

== Prefectural Cultural Properties ==
As of 27 March 2015, eleven properties have been designated at a prefectural level.

Property	Date	Municipality	Ownership	Comments	Image	Coordinates	Ref.
Documents of Kokubun-ji 国分寺文書; Kokubunji monjo		Imabari	Kokubun-ji (伊予国分寺)	three scrolls		34°01′34″N 133°01′32″E	for all refs see
Documents of Nōjaku-ji 能寂寺文書; Nōjakuji monjo		Imabari	Jōjaku-ji (浄寂寺)	one scroll		34°01′49″N 132°58′49″E	
Hachiman Gudōki 八幡愚童記; Hachiman gudōki		Yawatahama	Hachiman Jinja (八幡神社)	two volumes		33°27′30″N 132°25′38″E	
Documents of Saizen-ji 西禅寺文書; Saizenji monjo		Ōzu	Saizen-ji (西禅寺)	one scroll		33°34′43″N 132°32′50″E	
Documents of Zennō-ji 善応寺文書; Zennōji monjo		Matsuyama	Zennō-ji (善応寺)	five scrolls		33°56′49″N 132°47′40″E	
Documents of Kannen-ji 観念寺文書; Kannenji monjo		Saijō	Kannen-ji (観念寺)	fourteen scrolls		33°56′15″N 133°02′24″E	
Large Perfection of Wisdom Sutra 大般若経; Daihannya-kyō		Shikokuchūō	Kumano Jinja (熊野神社)	six hundred scrolls		33°56′44″N 133°38′22″E	
Documents of Kōryū-ji 興隆寺文書; Kōryūji monjo		Saijō	Kōryū-ji (興隆寺)	two scrolls		33°54′20″N 133°01′31″E	
Documents of Akirate-in 顕手院文書; Akirate-in monjo		Seiyo	Akirate-in (顕手院)	two volumes		33°22′13″N 132°42′29″E	
Documents of Takada Hachiman 高田八幡文書; Takada Hachiman monjo		Uwajima	Takada Hachima Jinja (高田八幡神社)	one scroll		33°07′52″N 132°31′57″E	
Documents of the Shigiyama Kikuchi Family 鴫山菊池家文書; Shigiyama Kikuchi-ke monjo		Seiyo	private	124 items		33°21′47″N 132°30′36″E	

== See also ==
- Cultural Property (Japan)
- List of National Treasures of Japan (writings: Chinese books)
- List of National Treasures of Japan (writings: Japanese books)
- List of National Treasures of Japan (writings: others)
- List of National Treasures of Japan (ancient documents)
