= Senyū-ji (Imabari) =

- 仙遊寺
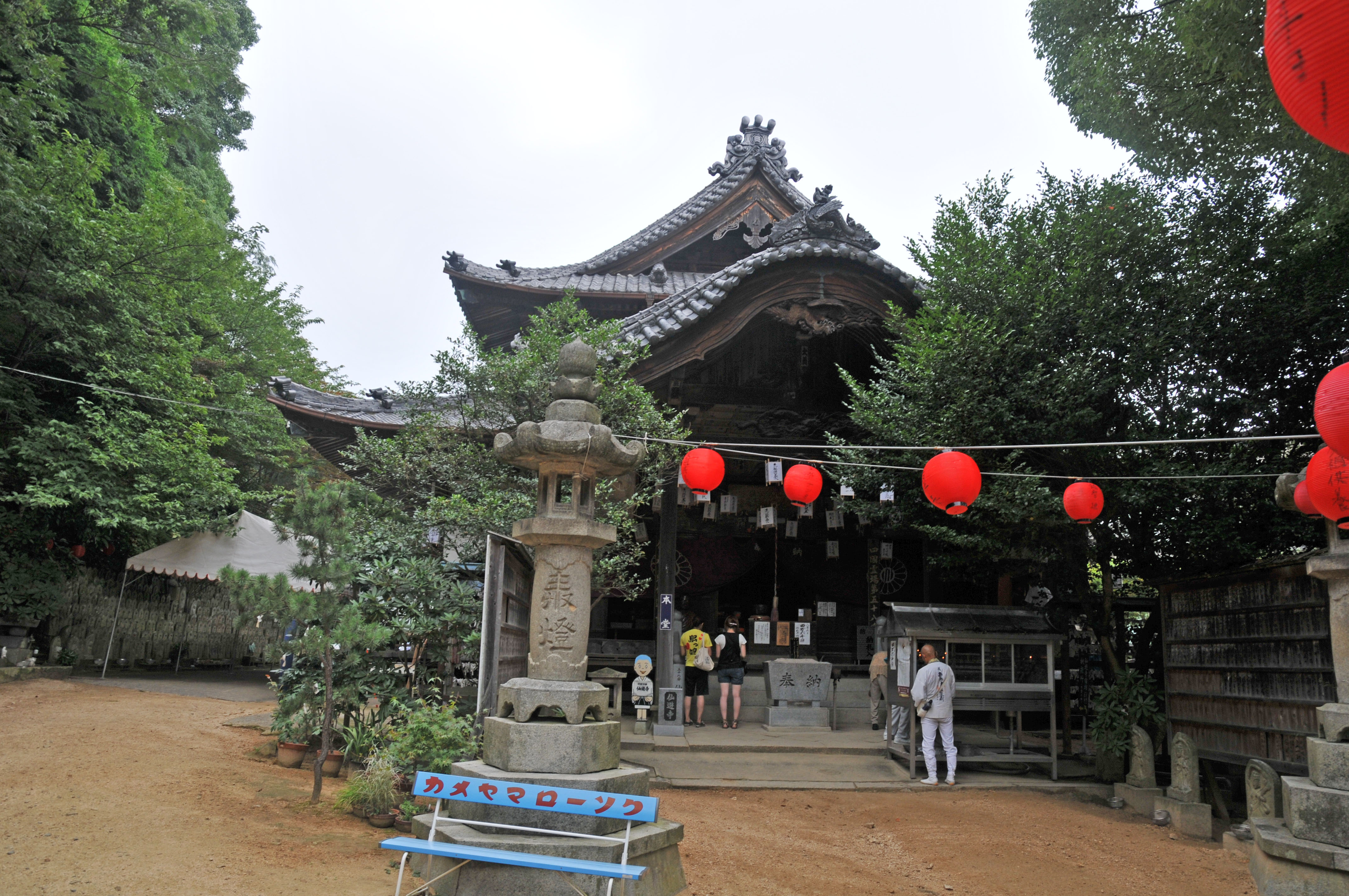

Religion
- Affiliation: Buddhism other_info =: Sect: [[{{{sect}}}]]

Location
- Country: Japan
- Interactive map of Senyū-ji

Senyū-ji (Japanese: 仙遊寺) is a temple belonging to the Koyasan Shingon sect, located in Bessho, Tamagawa-cho, Imabari City, Ehime Prefecture. Its formal mountain name is Sareizan, and its institutional name is Senkō-in. The principal deity is the Thousand-armed Kannon Bodhisattva. It serves as Temple No. 58 of the Shikoku 88 temple pilgrimage.

Mantra of the Principal Deity: Om vajra-dharma hrīḥ Pilgrim's Hymn: Draw near and rest within the Hall of Sareizan; there, chant the Six-Character Name and recite the sutras.

== Overview ==
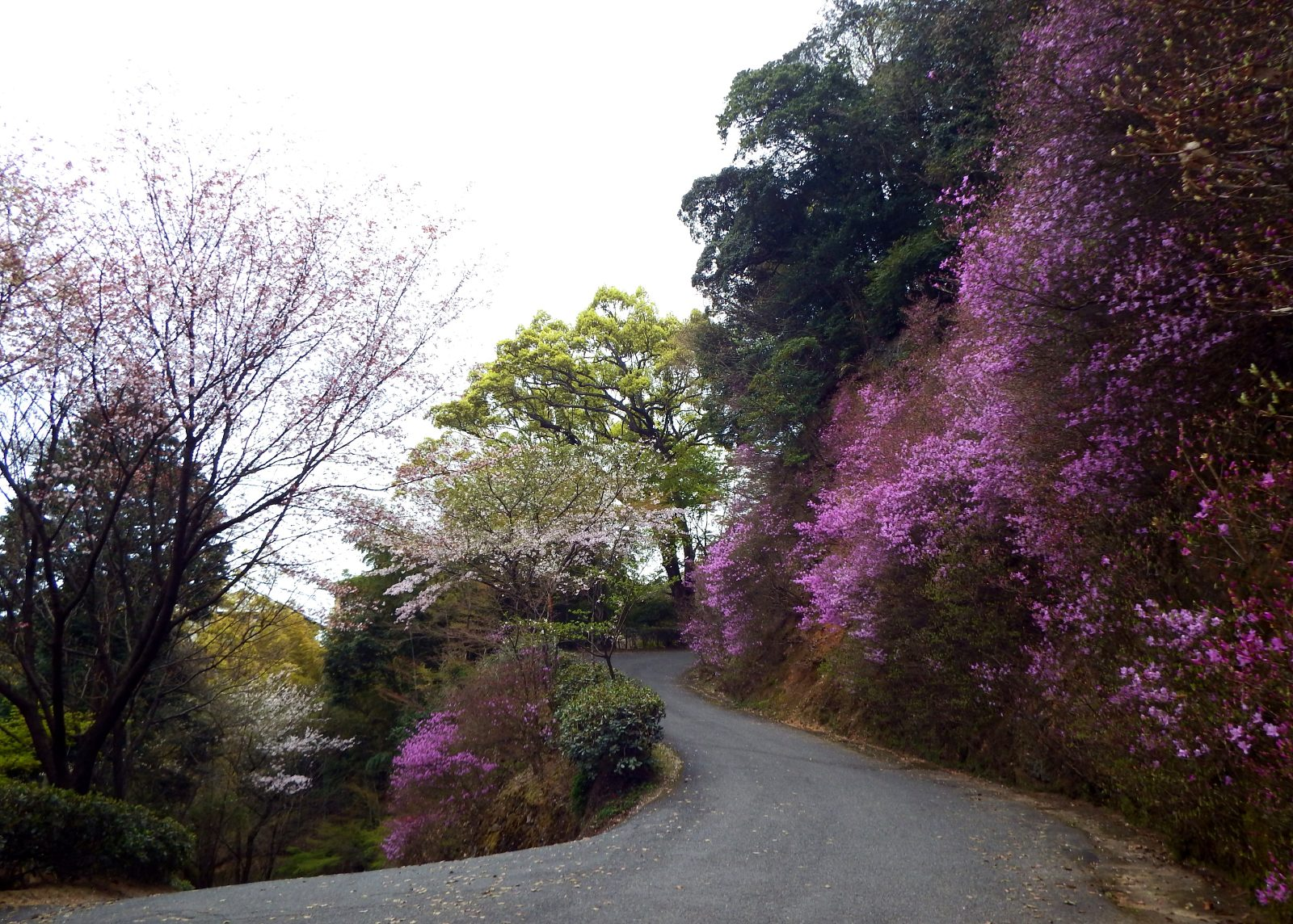
Access road to the temple grounds

The temple is situated near the eighth station of Mt. Sakurei, which stands at an elevation of 312 meters. The elevation of the temple grounds themselves is 261 meters. Thanks to an access road constructed for climbers during the mid-Showa era, visitors can reach the temple grounds without having to climb any stairs. Due to its mountaintop location—unique among nearby pilgrimage sites—the temple offers panoramic views stretching from the city center of Imabari all the way to the Seto Inland Sea. Along the access road, visitors can enjoy a seasonal display of flowers, including cherry blossoms, azaleas, rhododendrons, hydrangeas, and autumn foliage. The temple features a shukubo (temple lodging) equipped with natural hot springs and shojin ryori (vegetarian Buddhist cuisine). Annual events include the "Yakutobashi Saitō Dai-goma" (Great Open-Air Fire Ritual for Warding Off Misfortune) held on the second Sunday of January, and a summer festival—known as the "Shimanrokusen-nichi Dai-hōe" (Great 46,000-Day Service)—held on the Sunday immediately preceding August 9th. Chief Priest Oyamada is a passionate advocate for the designation of the Shikoku Pilgrimage sites as a UNESCO World Heritage property; notably, in a practice rare among Shikoku temples, both the principal image (Honzon) and the statue of Kūkai (Daishi-zō) are made available for public viewing year-round.

== History ==
At the behest of Emperor Tenji (reigned 661–672), Ochi Morióki—the Governor of Iyo Province—constructed the temple buildings. Legend has it that the principal image, the Thousand-armed Kannon Bodhisattva, was carved by a Dragon Maiden who emerged from the sea; she is said to have performed "one bow for every stroke of the knife" (ittō-sanrei) while sculpting it. This legend is the origin of the temple's mountain name, "Sakureizan." Furthermore, a monk known as Abō Sennin, who spent forty years maintaining and improving the temple complex, once resided here; it is said that the temple's name, "Sen'yūji," derives from the fact that in the second year of the Yōrō era (718), he suddenly vanished—as if frolicking among the clouds.

It is said that when Kūkai (Kōbō Daishi) visited Shikoku on his pilgrimage, he performed rituals at this temple; seeking to bring relief to those suffering from illness, he dug a well, and he also restored, rebuilt, and revitalized the temple complex, which had fallen into disrepair.

Although the temple fell into ruin during the Edo period, it was restored in the early Meiji era by the Venerable Yūren. The Venerable Yūren entered nyūjō (ritual self-mummification)—regarded as the final instance of sokushin-jōbutsu (attaining Buddhahood in this very body) in Japan—in the fourth year of the Meiji era (1871); a memorial stupa dedicated to him stands at this temple. (Note: In reality, the Venerable Fukai is considered to have been the last to enter nyūjō, doing so in the 36th year of the Meiji era (1903) in Murakami City, Niigata Prefecture, at the age of 76.)

In 1947, a forest fire engulfed the entire mountain, resulting in the destruction of the Senyū-ji archives; however, the principal image and the statue of the Great Master miraculously escaped the blaze. The Main Hall was reconstructed in its original form in 1953, followed by the reconstruction of the Great Master's Hall in 1958.

The pilgrim path leading from the main gate to the temple grounds was closed to traffic due to flooding on November 2, 2024; however, repairs were completed on December 11 of the same year, and the path has since reopened for passage.

== Temple Grounds ==
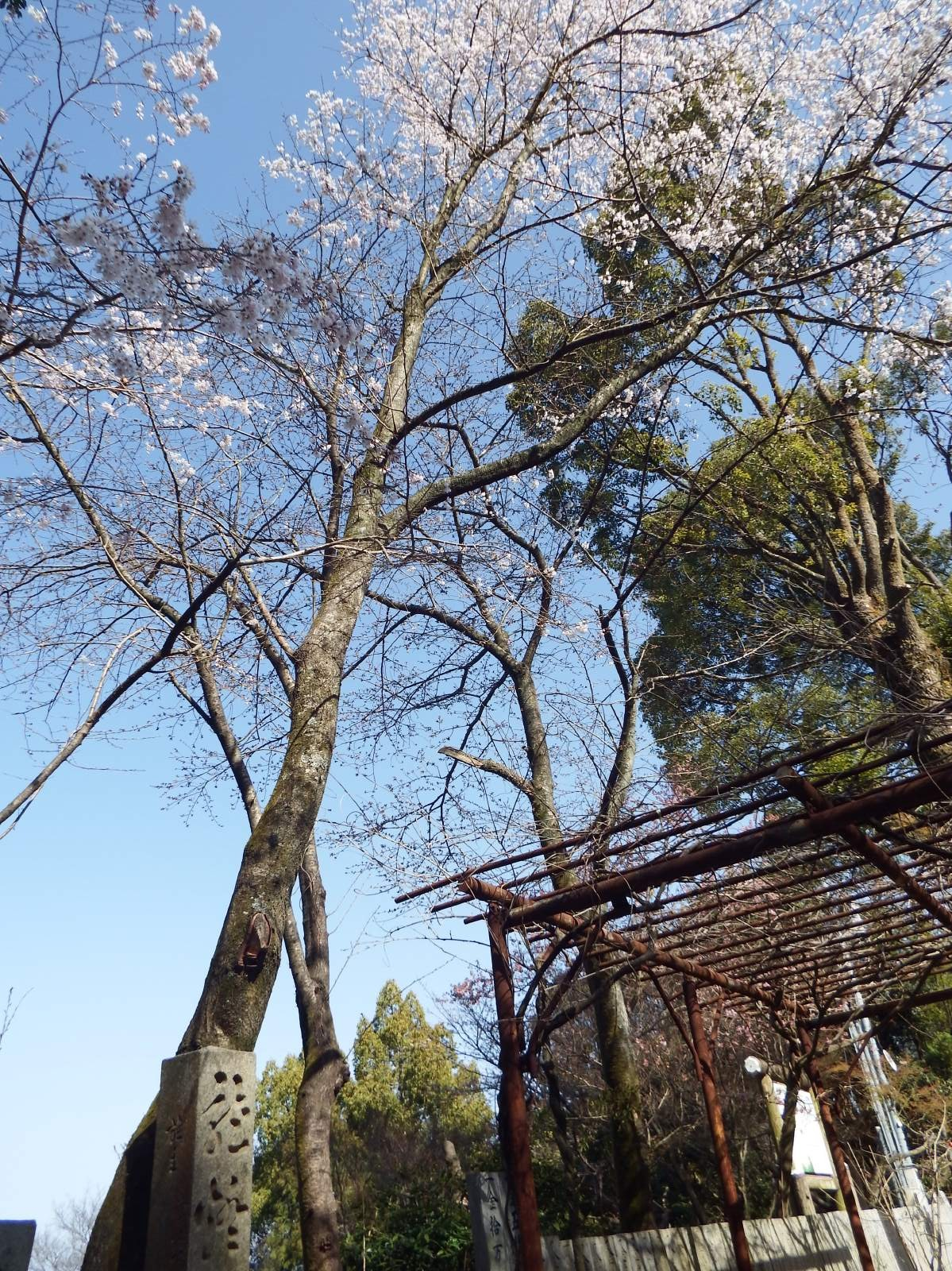
Ryūtō-zakura (Dragon Lantern Cherry Tree)

- Sanmon (Main Gate) / Niōmon (Gate of the Two Deva Kings)
- Hondō (Main Hall): The principal image is a standing statue measuring six *shaku* (approx. 1.8 meters) in height; it is believed to be a work from the late Heian period. However, due to severe deterioration, it underwent a three-year restoration process at the Kyoto National Museum; following this restoration, it was made available for public viewing starting in 2004 (Heisei 16). It currently holds no official designation as a cultural property.
- Daishidō (Founder's Hall): Visitors may pay their respects to the statue of the Great Master (Kōbō Daishi) housed within.
- Shōrō (Bell Tower): Previously situated in the center of the temple grounds, it was renovated and relocated to the perimeter in January 2016.
- New Shikoku 88-Temple Pilgrimage "Sand-Treading" Site: A stone statue of the Great Master engaged in ascetic training is encircled by eighty-eight boat-shaped stone Buddha images, around which lies the designated area for the "sand-treading" ritual.
- Memorial Pagoda (Gorintō) for Priest Yūren: A five-ringed stone pagoda marking the passing of Priest Yūren on the 26th day of the 8th month of the 5th year of the Meiji era (1872).
- Monument to the Ryūtō-zakura (Dragon Lantern Cherry Tree): This monument marks the site of a legendary cherry tree. According to the legend, on the 9th day of the 7th lunar month, a procession of "dragon lanterns" would ascend the Ryūtō River and come to rest upon the branches of this very cherry tree located within the temple grounds.
- Kawarage (Roof-Tile Throwing) Torii Gate: Looking down the slope from the vicinity of the Ryūtō-zakura, one can spot a red *torii* gate situated on the hillside.
- Buddha's Footprint Stone, Sentai-butsu (One Thousand Buddha Images), and Statue of Koyasu Kannon (Kannon of Safe Childbirth).
- Kōbō Daishi's Kaji (Healing Prayer) Well: Located approximately halfway along the old pilgrimage path—a walking trail that ascends into the temple grounds after passing through the Niōmon gate.
- Stone Buddha Images Replicating the Kannon Pilgrimage Sites, and a Gorintō (Five-Ringed Pagoda) Associated with Emperor Tenji: In July 1996 (Heisei 8), thirty-three stone statues of Kannon were installed throughout the mountainous area situated behind the temple grounds. The trailhead for this route is located to the left side of the Daishidō. Situated along the mountain ridge—which leads toward the summit where these Kannon statues are scattered—stands a *gorintō* said to have been erected in memory of Emperor Tenji. As you ascend the access road toward the temple, passing the Senyuji Lower Rest Area, you will encounter the Niomon Gate. If you bypass the Niomon Gate (leaving it to your left) and continue all the way to the top of the road, you will reach a T-junction; turning right leads to the bus turnaround, while turning left brings you to the parking lot situated directly in front of the temple grounds. You will enter the temple precinct from behind the Main Hall. For those arriving on foot, ascending the mountain path from the Niomon Gate leads directly to the temple grounds. Immediately before you stands a stone statue of the Ascetic Kobo Daishi, surrounded by numerous smaller stone Buddhas. Further ahead lies the Bell Tower, with the Daishi Hall situated to its right; beyond these stands the Main Hall. At the entrance to the Main Hall stands the largest statue of Binzuru Sonja (Pindola Bharadvaja) in Shikoku, and the Nokyosho (Sutra Office) is located inside. The "Thousand Buddha" statues are situated in the back-left corner of the Main Hall area, and just beyond them stands a large statue of Koyasu Kannon (the Bodhisattva of Safe Childbirth).
- Shukubo (Temple Lodging) — Soshinsha: 12 guest rooms; capacity of 50 guests (reservations required).
- Parking: Space for 30 standard vehicles and 4 large vehicles (buses). A road maintenance fee of 400 yen (for light vehicles and standard cars) is collected at the Nokyosho (Sutra Office) when you receive your temple stamp.
- Ryujukyu (Dragon Maiden Shrine): Located within a small park situated at the rest area below the Senyuji Niomon Gate, this site features a pond (the Senyuji Hojo-ike or "Life-Release Pond") and a small gazebo.
- Haiku Monuments: Two stone monuments bearing haiku verses can be found on the temple grounds: one by "Kobo-shi"—"A temple of rest / for the pilgrim's journey / of the heart"—stands beside the access road; the other, by "Minoru"—"Namu Daishi / struck by falling nuts / how grateful I am"—is located at the Lower Temple Rest Area.
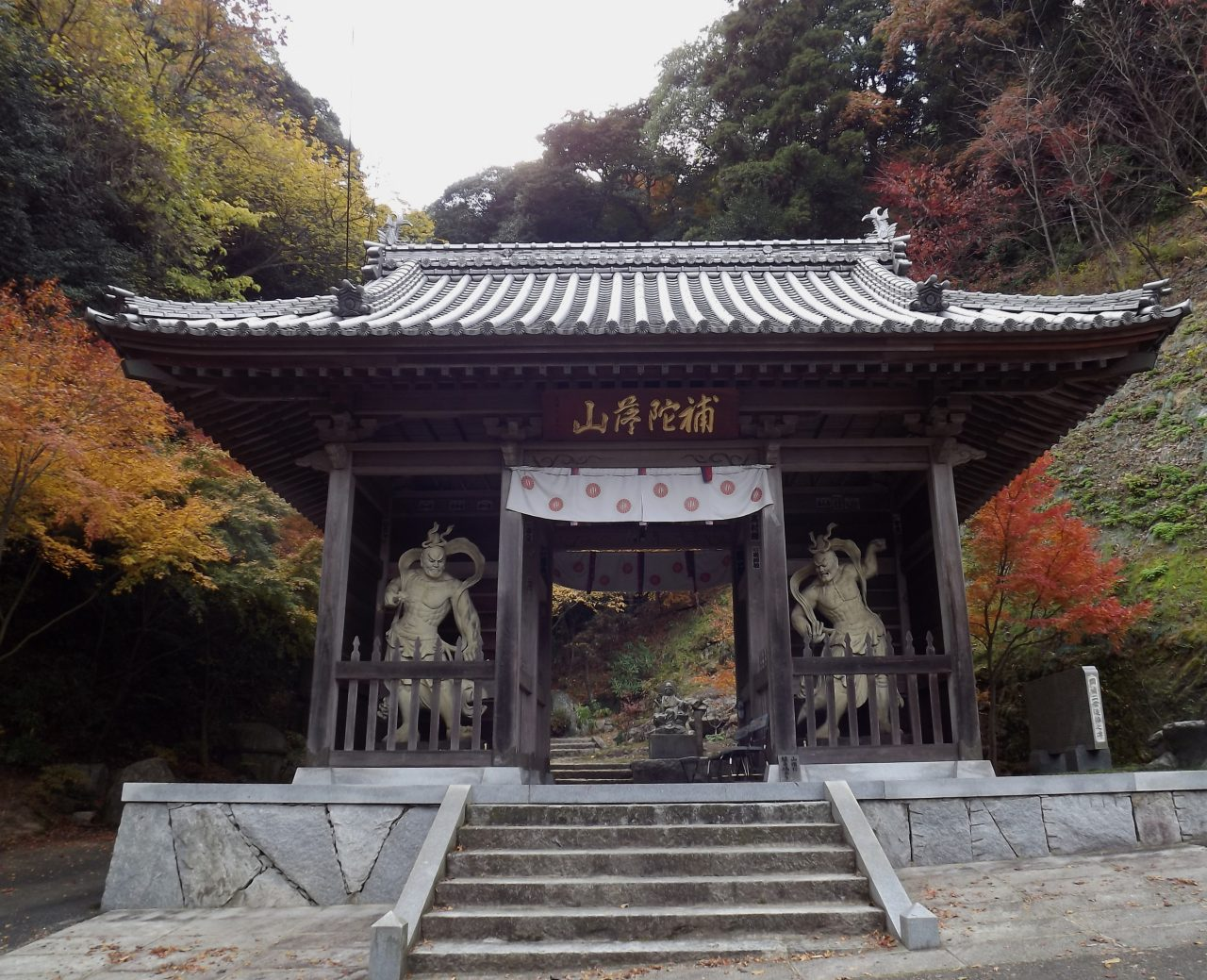
  Main Gate
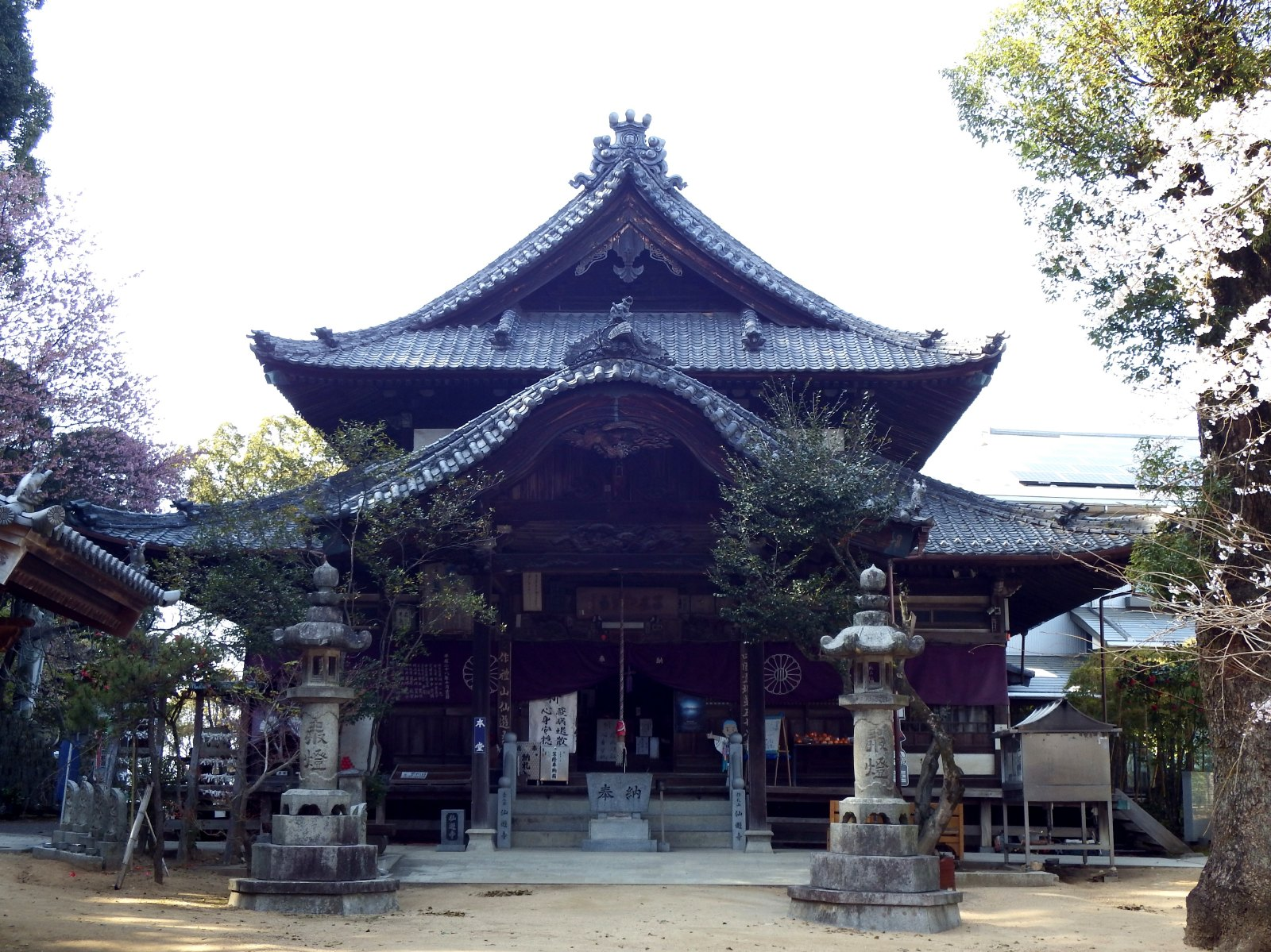
  Main Hall
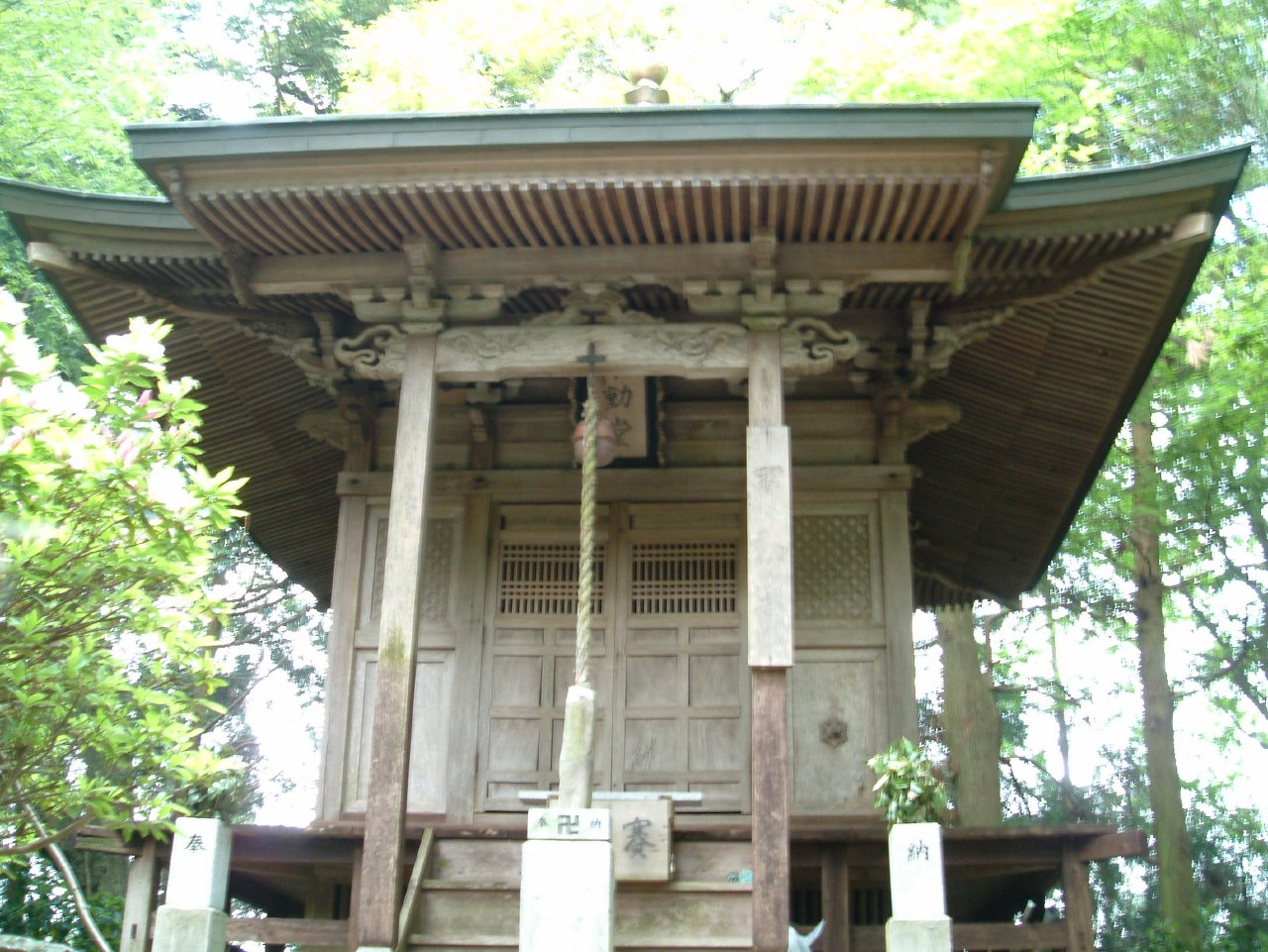
  Daishi Hall
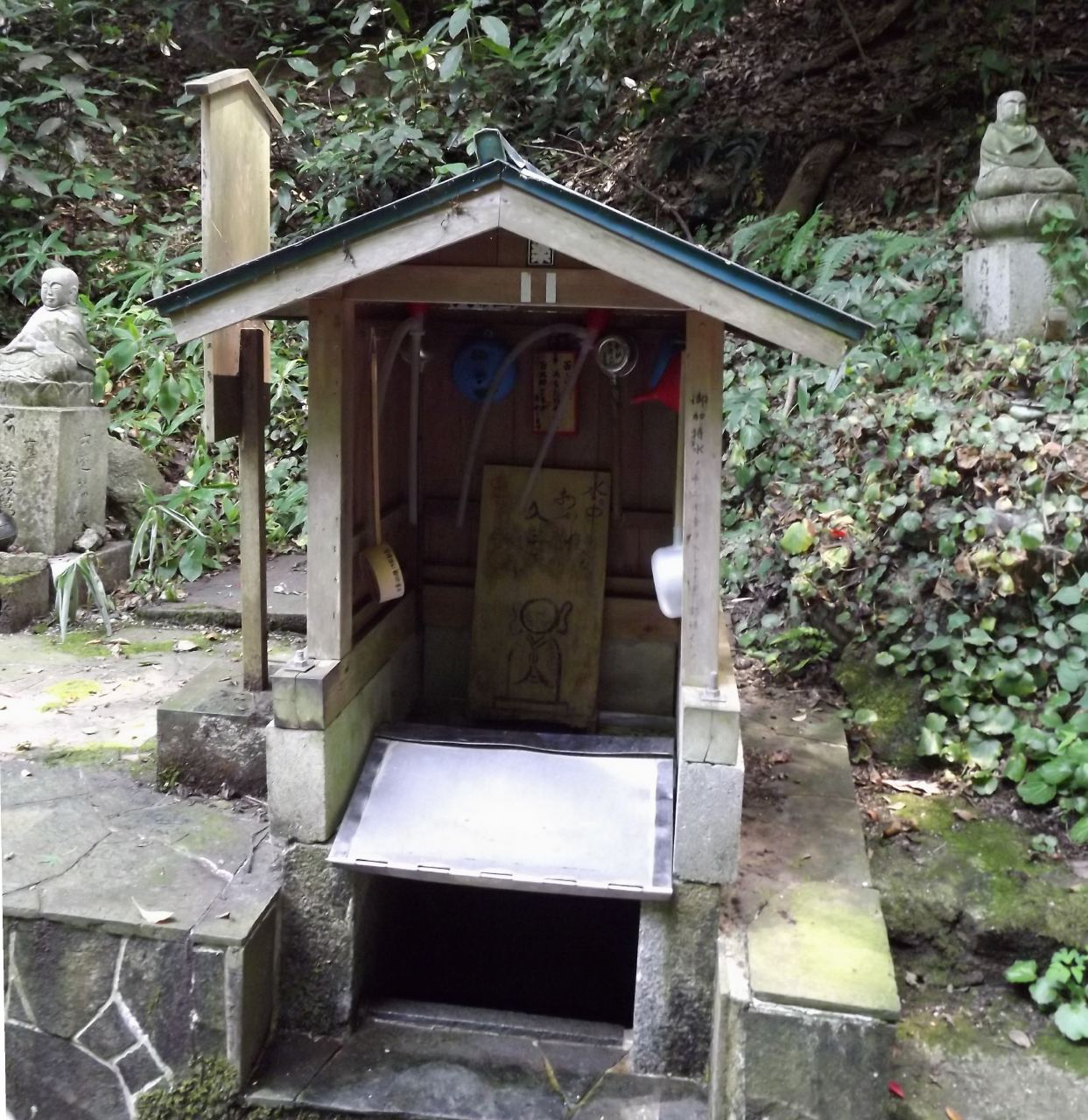
  The Healing Well
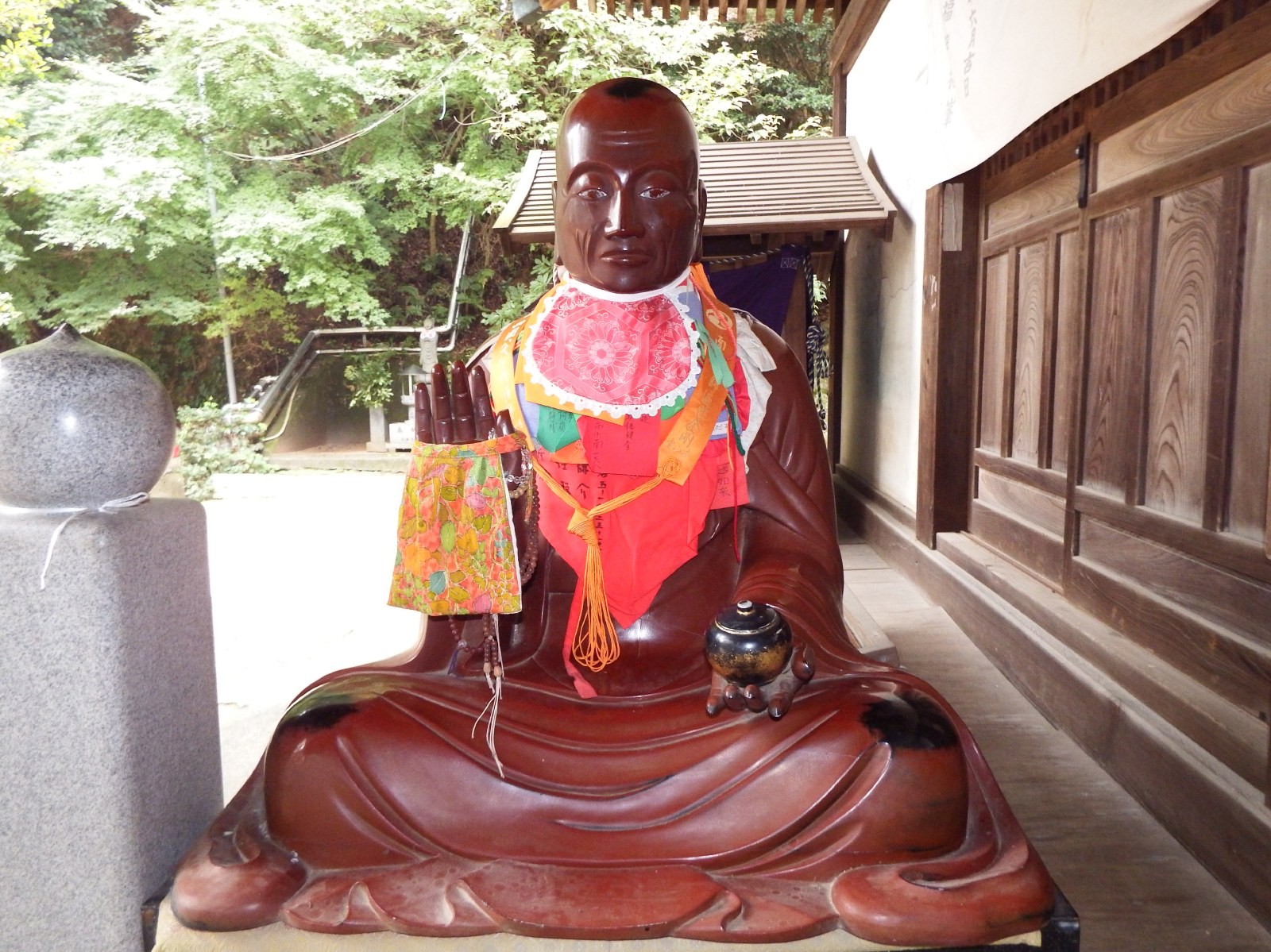
  Shikoku's Largest Binzuru Statue
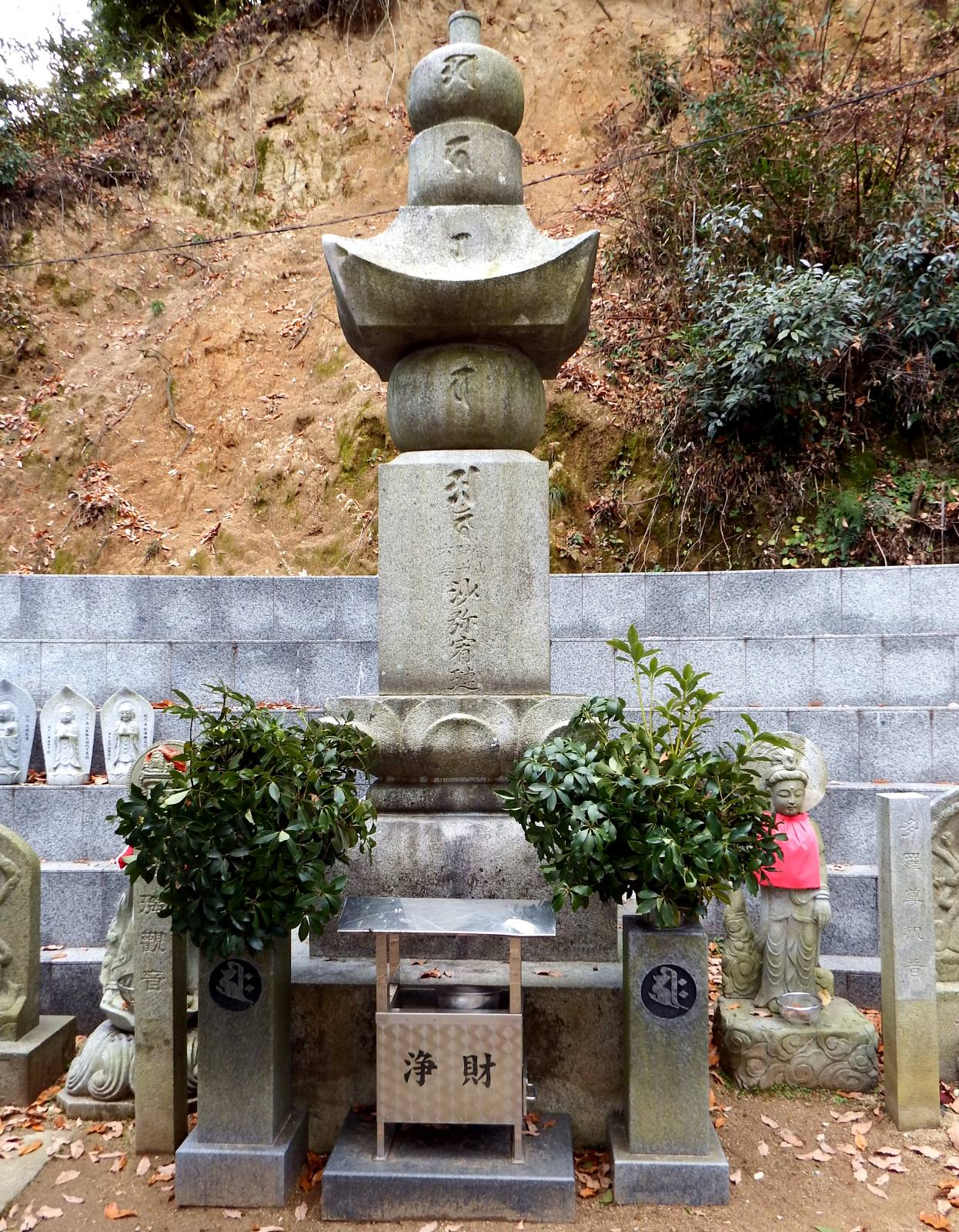
  Memorial Pagoda for Priest Yūren
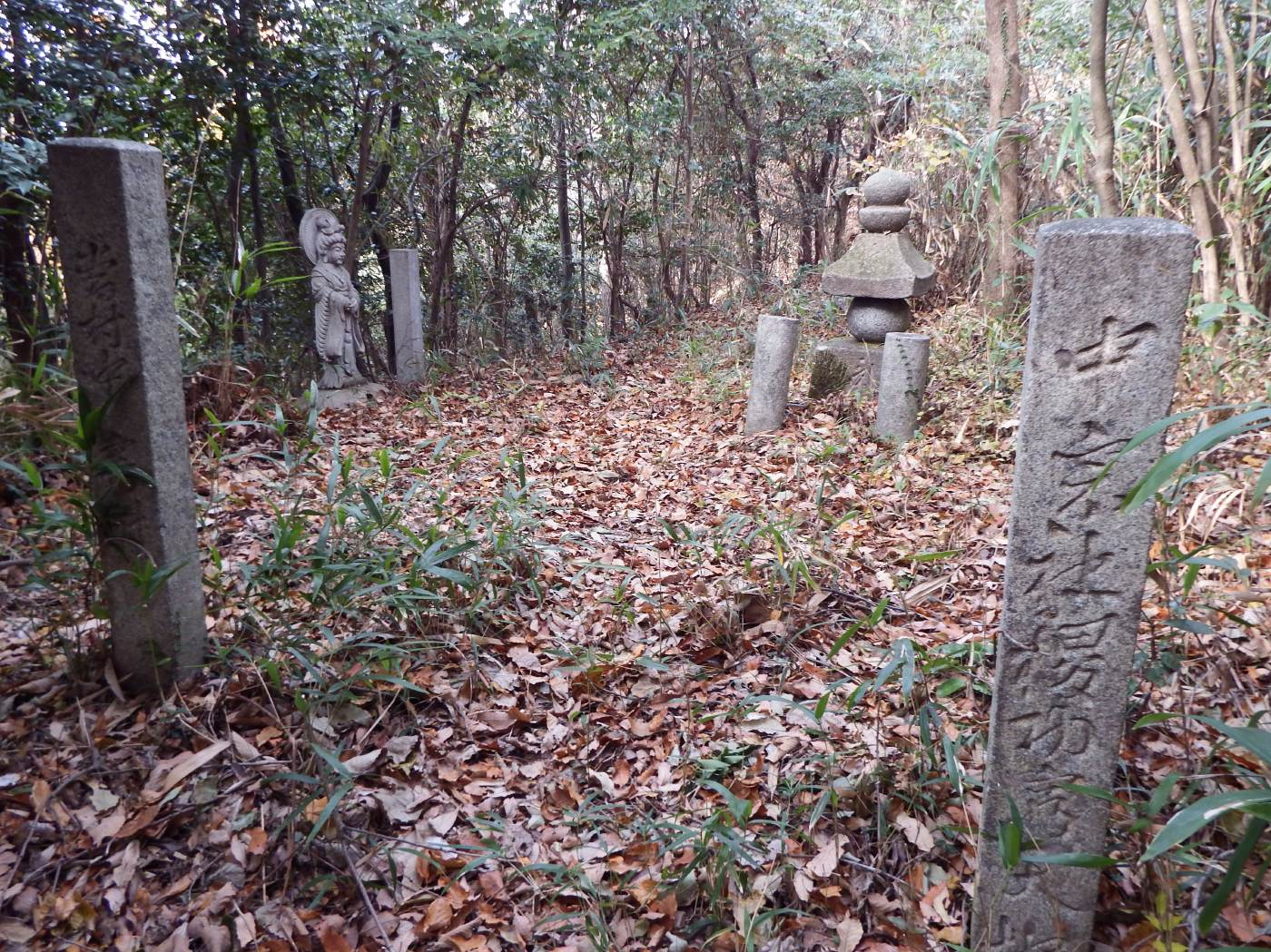
  Gorintō Pagoda Linked to Emperor Tenji and Kannon Pilgrimage Statues
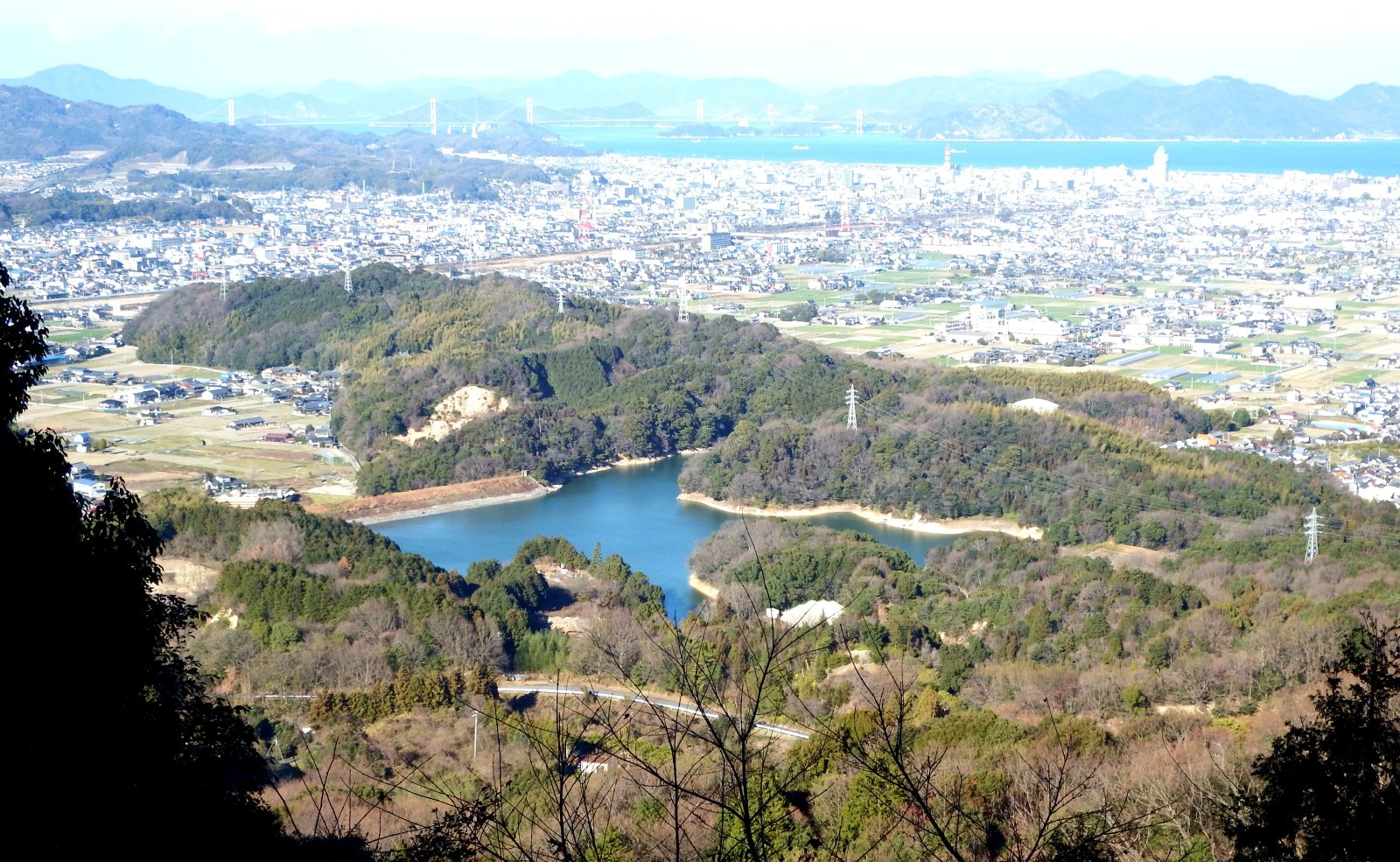
  View of Inuzuka Pond from the Temple Grounds
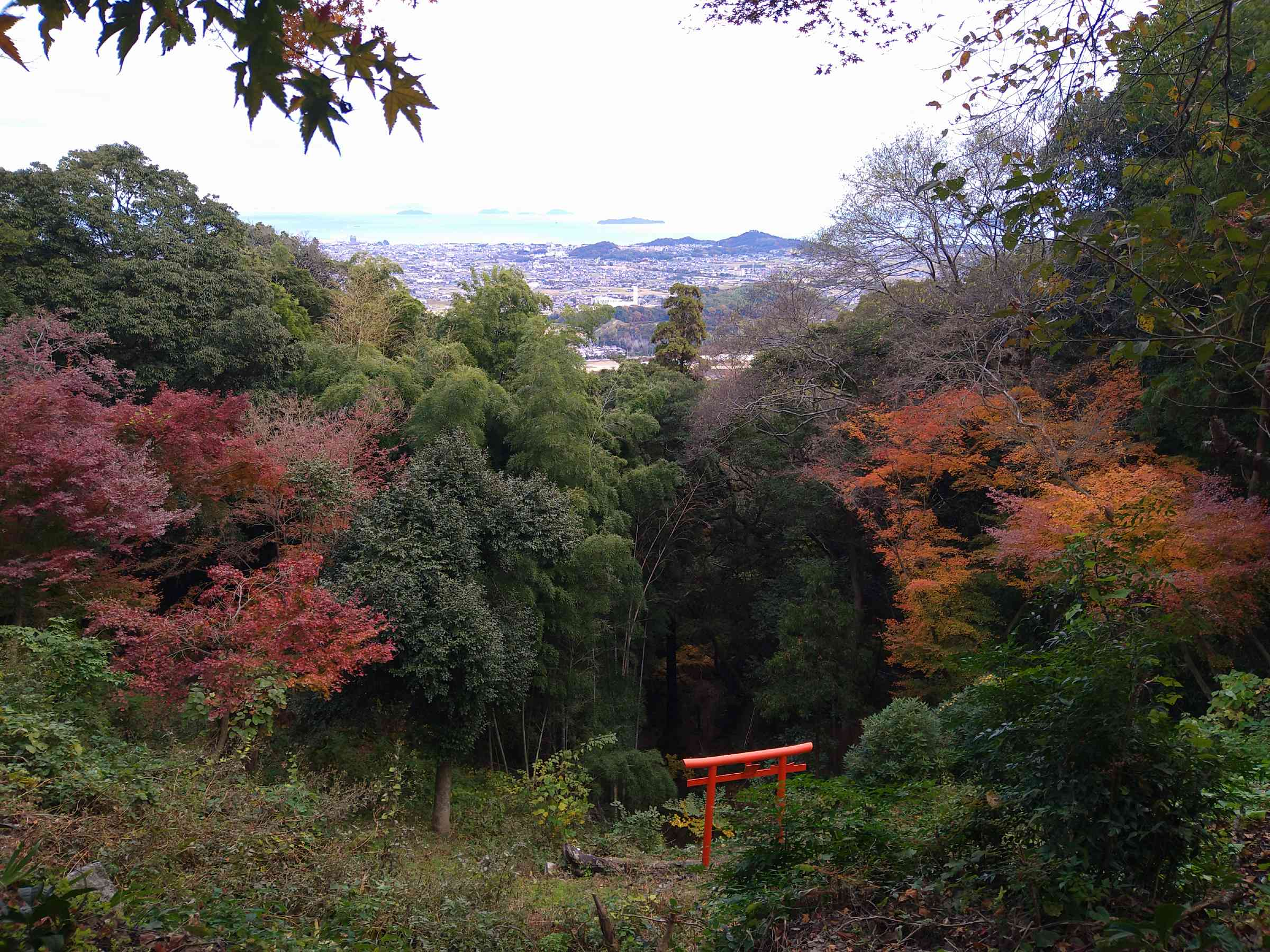
  Scenery from the Temple Precincts
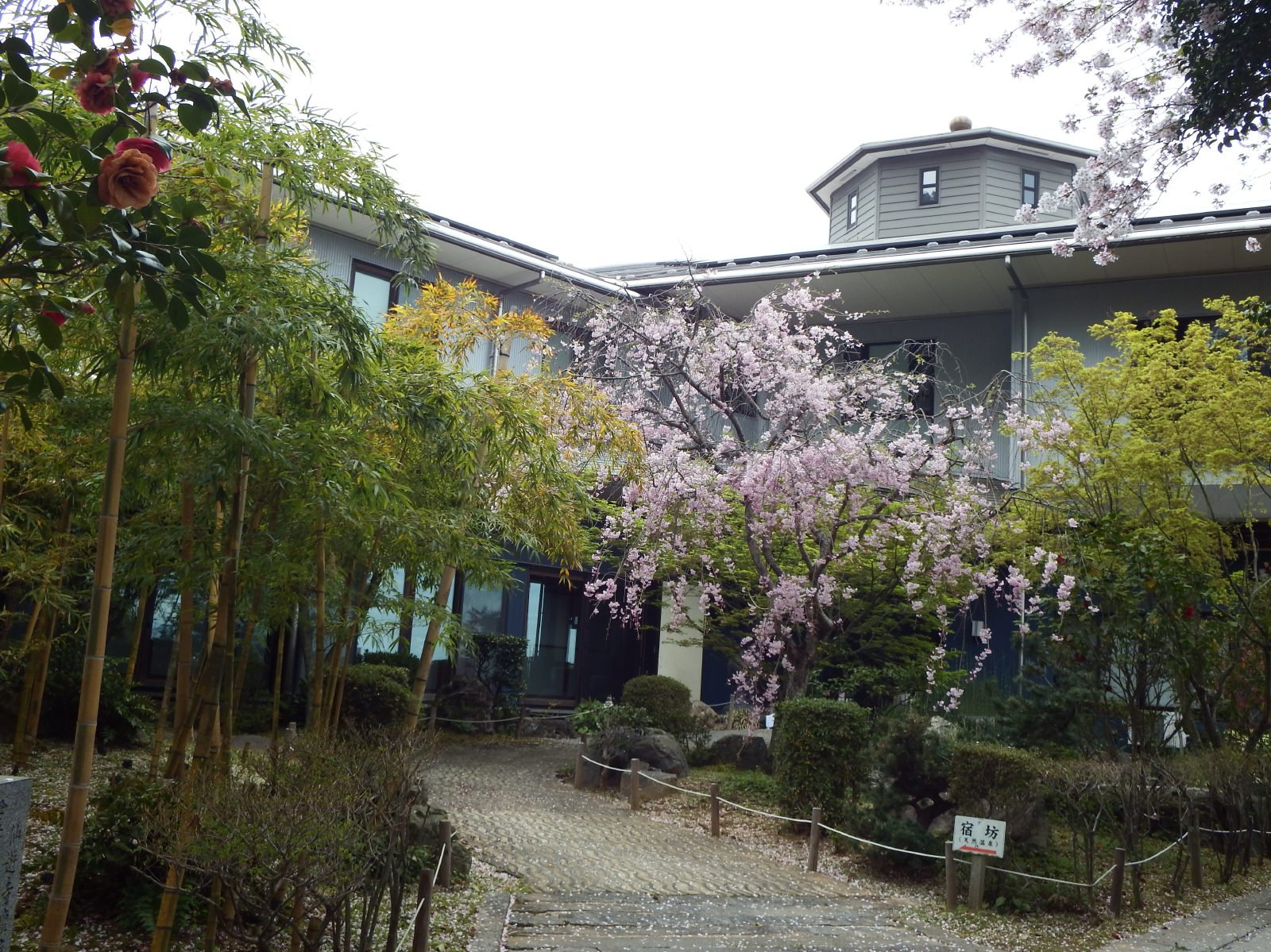
  Temple Lodging (Shukubō)
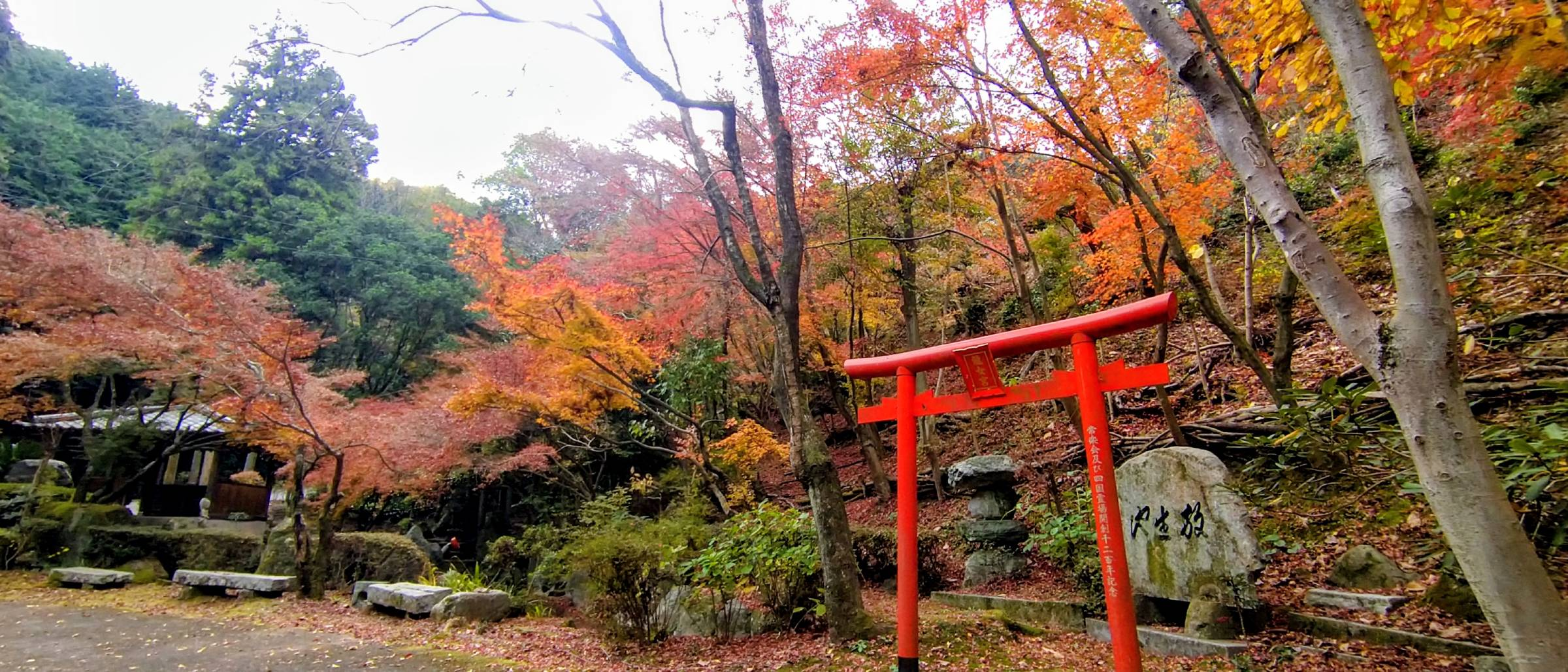
  Senyūji Release Pond
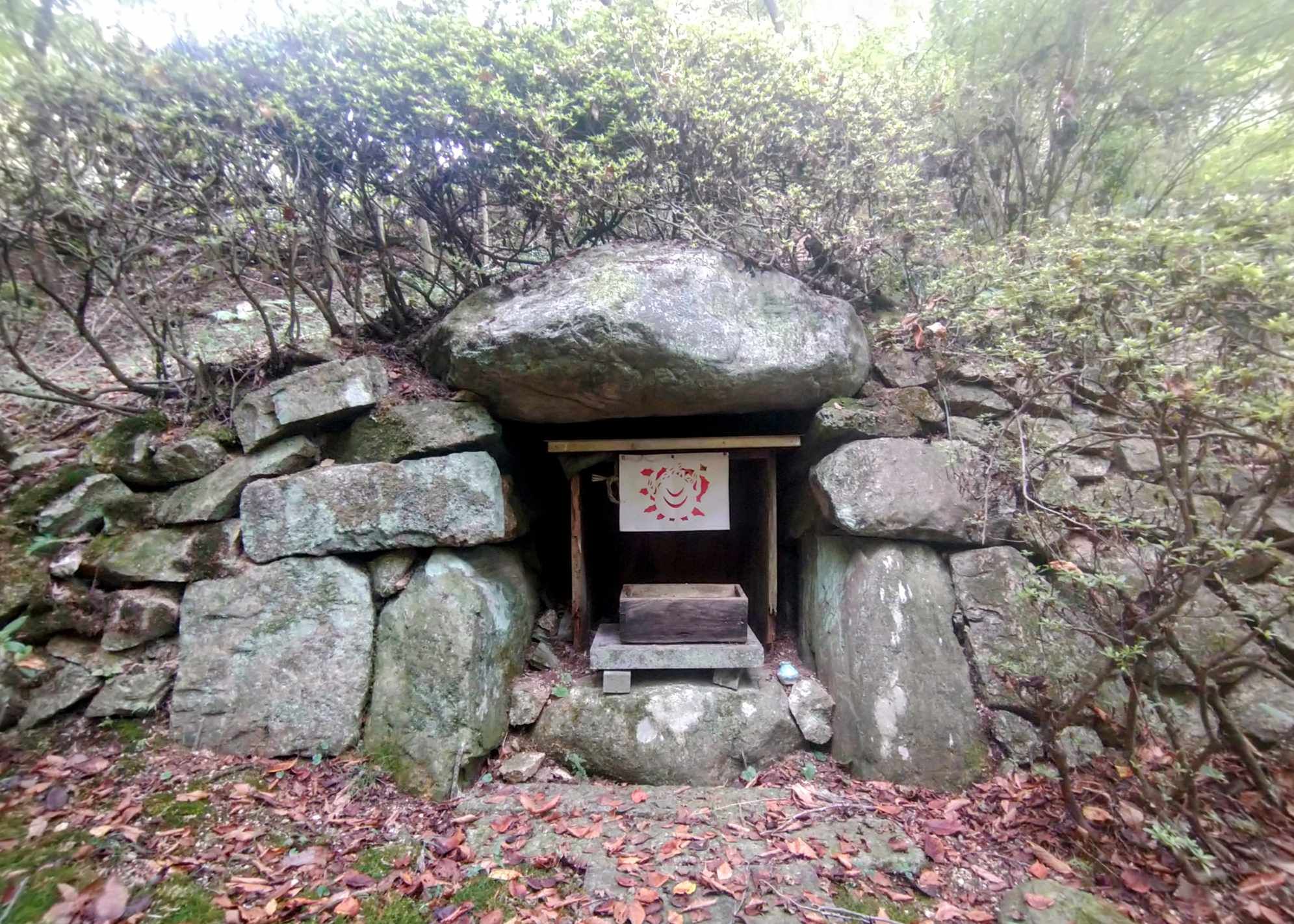
  Ryūnyo-gū (Dragon Princess Shrine)

== Cultural Properties ==
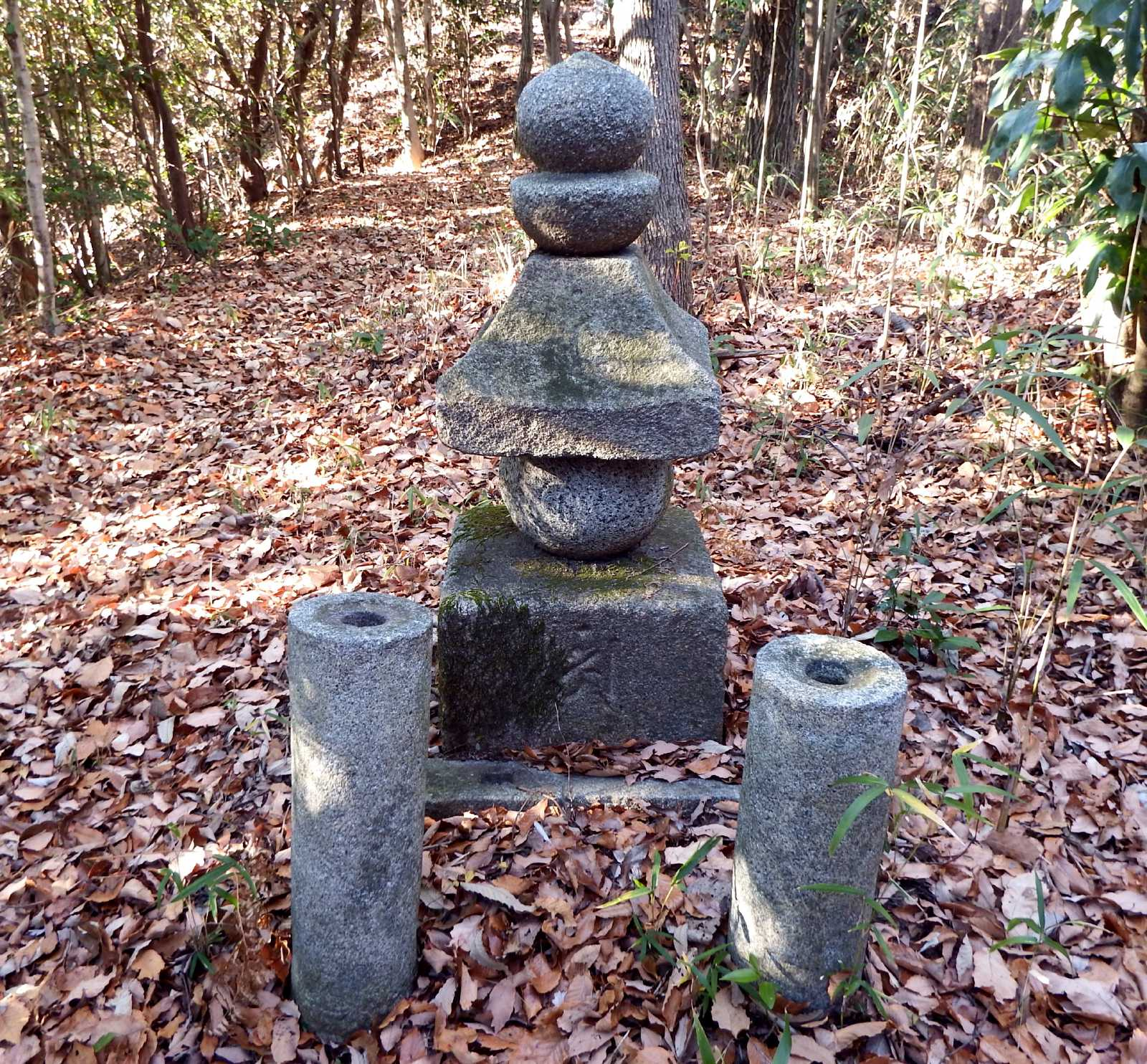
Gorintō (Five-Ring Pagoda)

=== Imabari City Designated Tangible Cultural Property ===
- Gorintō (Five-Ring Pagoda): A five-ring pagoda associated with Emperor Tenji. Designated on March 20, 1970.

=== Imabari City Designated Place of Scenic Beauty ===
- Mt. Hachiman, Inuzuka Pond, and Mt. Sakurei: The scenic view of Inuzuka Pond as viewed from this temple. Designated on March 1, 1964.

== Access ==
=== Rail ===
- Shikoku Railway Company (JR Shikoku) Yosan Line — Imabari Station (7.0 km)

=== Bus ===
- From Imabari Port (Imabari Pier) or Imabari Station: Take a Setouchi Bus bound for Matsuyama-shi Station, Kigiguchi/Kuzutani, or Mikomori (via Nukegawa), and alight at "Osugi."
- From Matsuyama-shi Station: Take a Setouchi Bus Express bound for Imabari or Omishima, and alight at "Osugi" (3.5 km).

=== Road ===
- Local Roads: Ehime Prefectural Route 155 (Imabari-Tanbara Line) — Tenjinbara (2.6 km)
- Expressway: Nishiseto Expressway (Nishiseto Shimanami Kaido) — Imabari IC (5.2 km)

== Neighboring Temples ==
=== Shikoku Pilgrimage ===
57 Eifuku-ji --(2.4 km)-- 58 Senyū-ji --(6.1 km)-- 59 Kokubun-ji
*Note: There are multiple routes for the pilgrimage path; the distances listed above are based on the standard route.

== Surroundings ==
- Inuzuka (Dog Mound): In the past, when the head priest served concurrently at both Eifuku-ji Temple and this temple, a clever black dog assisted with the temple duties, shuttling back and forth between the two sites whenever summoned by the sound of their respective bells. One day, the bells at both temples rang simultaneously; unable to decide which way to go—and feeling that he could no longer fulfill his duties—the dog threw himself into a nearby pond. Grieved by this tragedy, the villagers erected a memorial mound for the dog on the pond's edge, and the pond subsequently came to be known as Inuzuka Pond (34°1′27.47″N 132°58′38.98″E). Note: Due to renovation work on Inuzuka Pond, the Inuzuka mound itself was relocated to the grounds of this temple in 2023.
- Gorobee-zaka Slope: A steep slope located approximately 0.5 km along the pilgrimage route from the Senyu-ji Temple lower rest area, heading toward Kokubun-ji Temple. There is an anecdote associated with this slope involving a fisherman named Gorobee. Believing that the sound of this temple's drum was scaring away the fish and preventing him from making a catch, Gorobee slashed and destroyed the drum. Later, while descending the mountain, he stumbled and fell on this steep slope; the injuries he sustained in the fall ultimately led to his death.
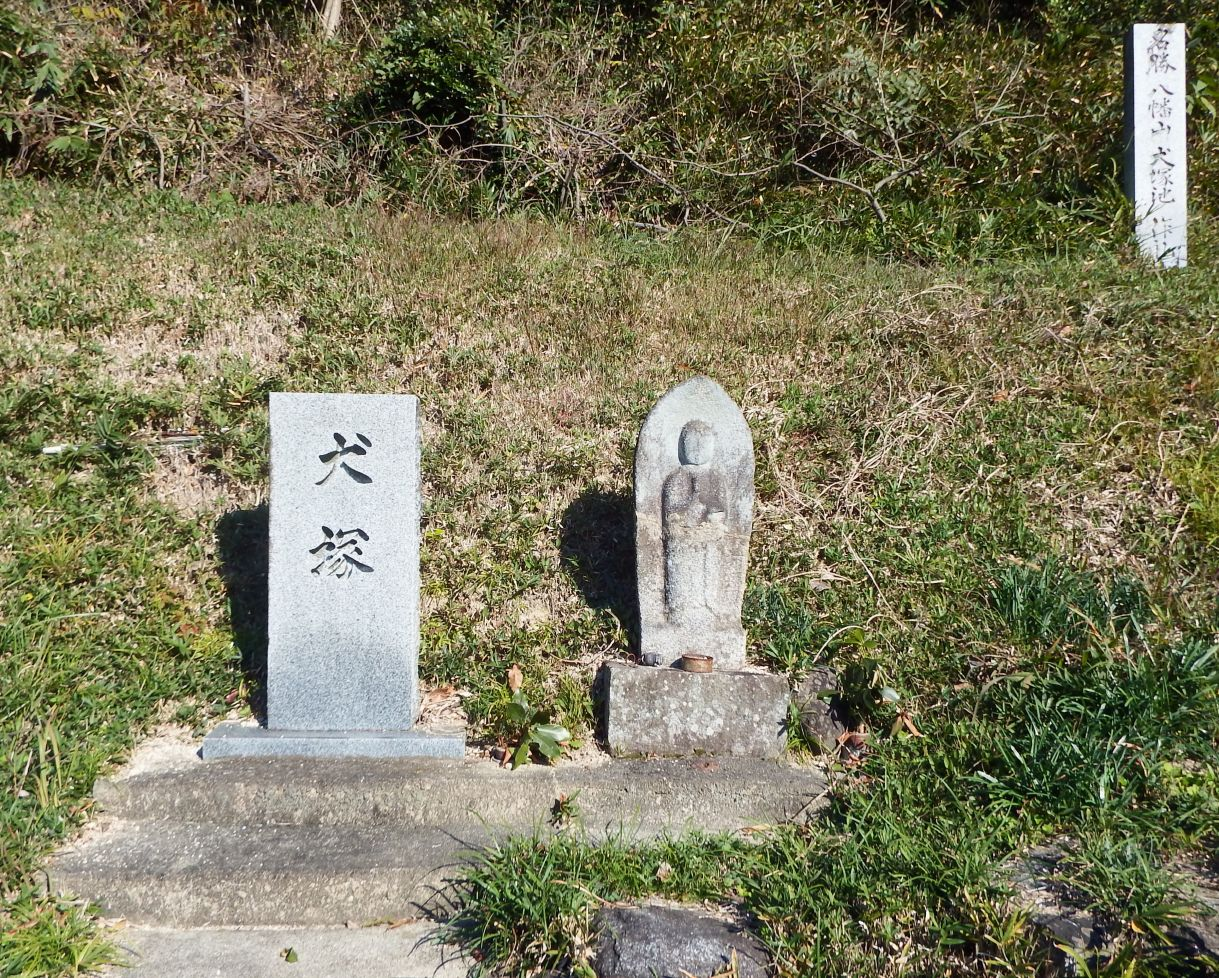
Inuzuka (Pre-relocation)

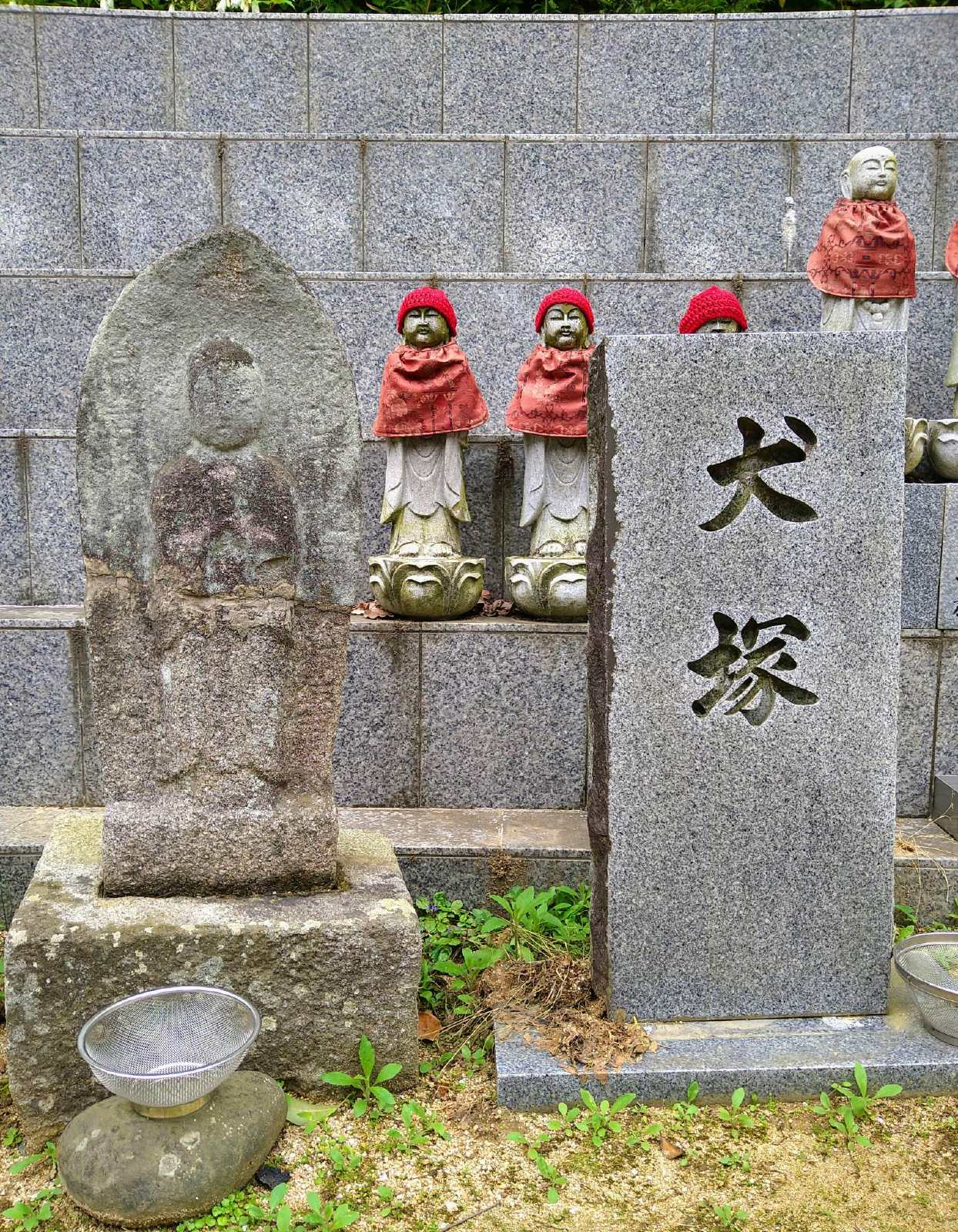
Inuzuka (Post-relocation)

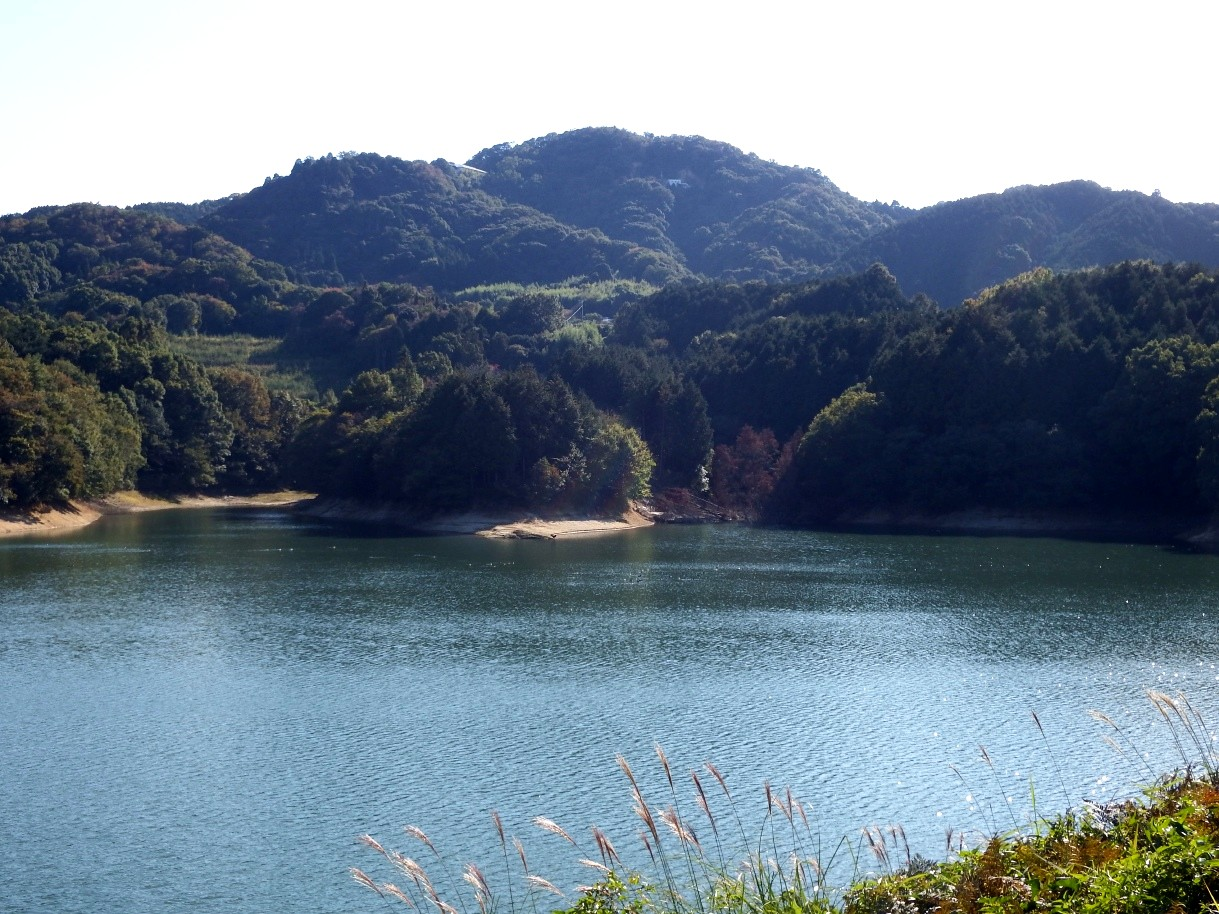
Inuzuka Pond and Mt. Sakurei

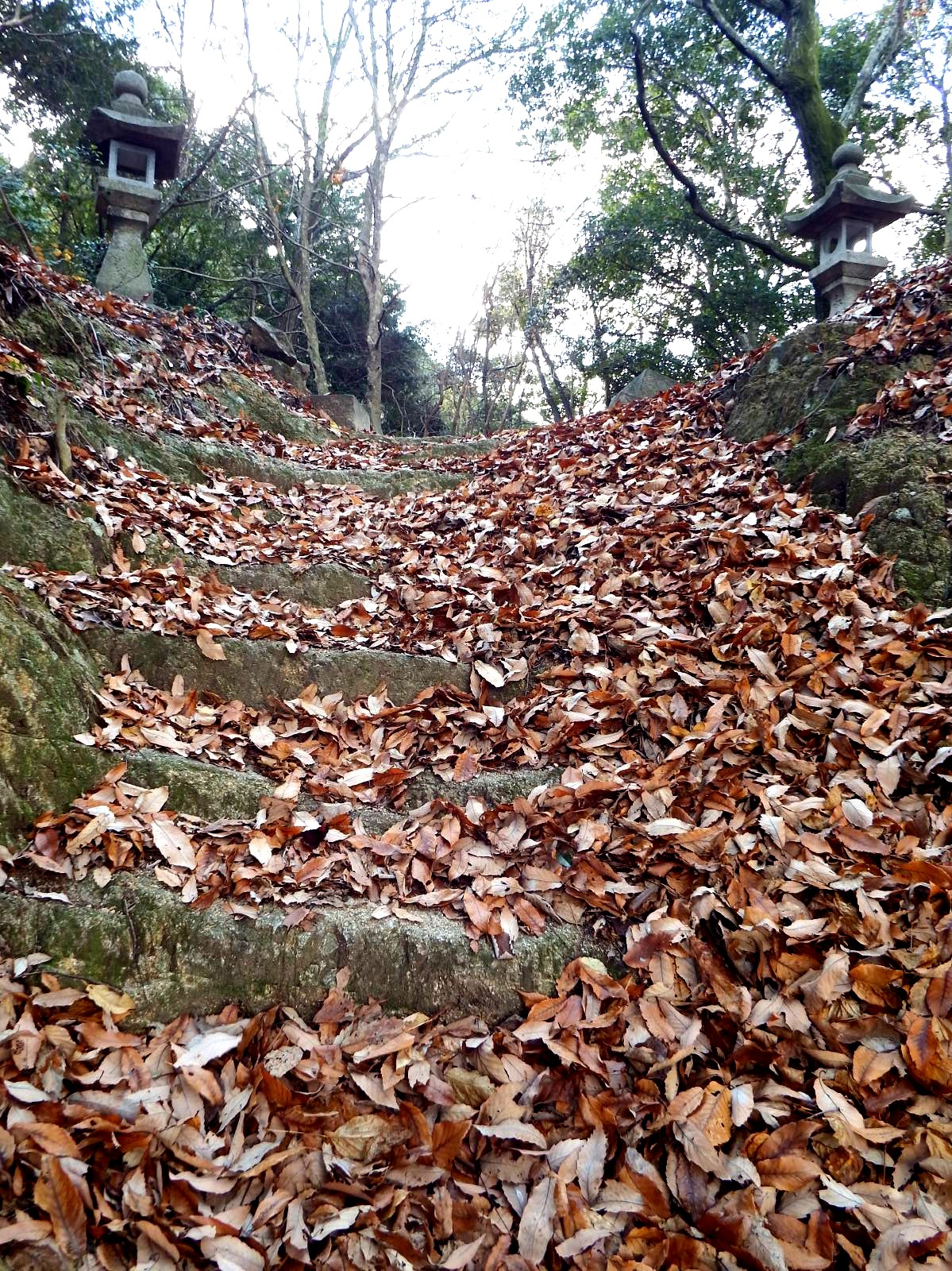
Gorobee-zaka Slope

== See also ==
- Shikoku Pilgrimage
- List of Buddhist temples in Japan

== Bibliography ==
- Shikoku 88 Temple Pilgrimage Association, ed. (2006). Pilgrim Guide's Canon. Shikoku 88 Temple Pilgrimage Association.
- Tateki Miyazaki (2007). Shikoku Pilgrimage: Walking Alone, Yet Accompanied by Two. Vol. Map Edition (8th ed.). Henromichi Preservation Cooperation Association.
