= Iyo Kokubun-ji =

Buddhist temple in Imabari, Ehime, Japan

- 伊予国分寺
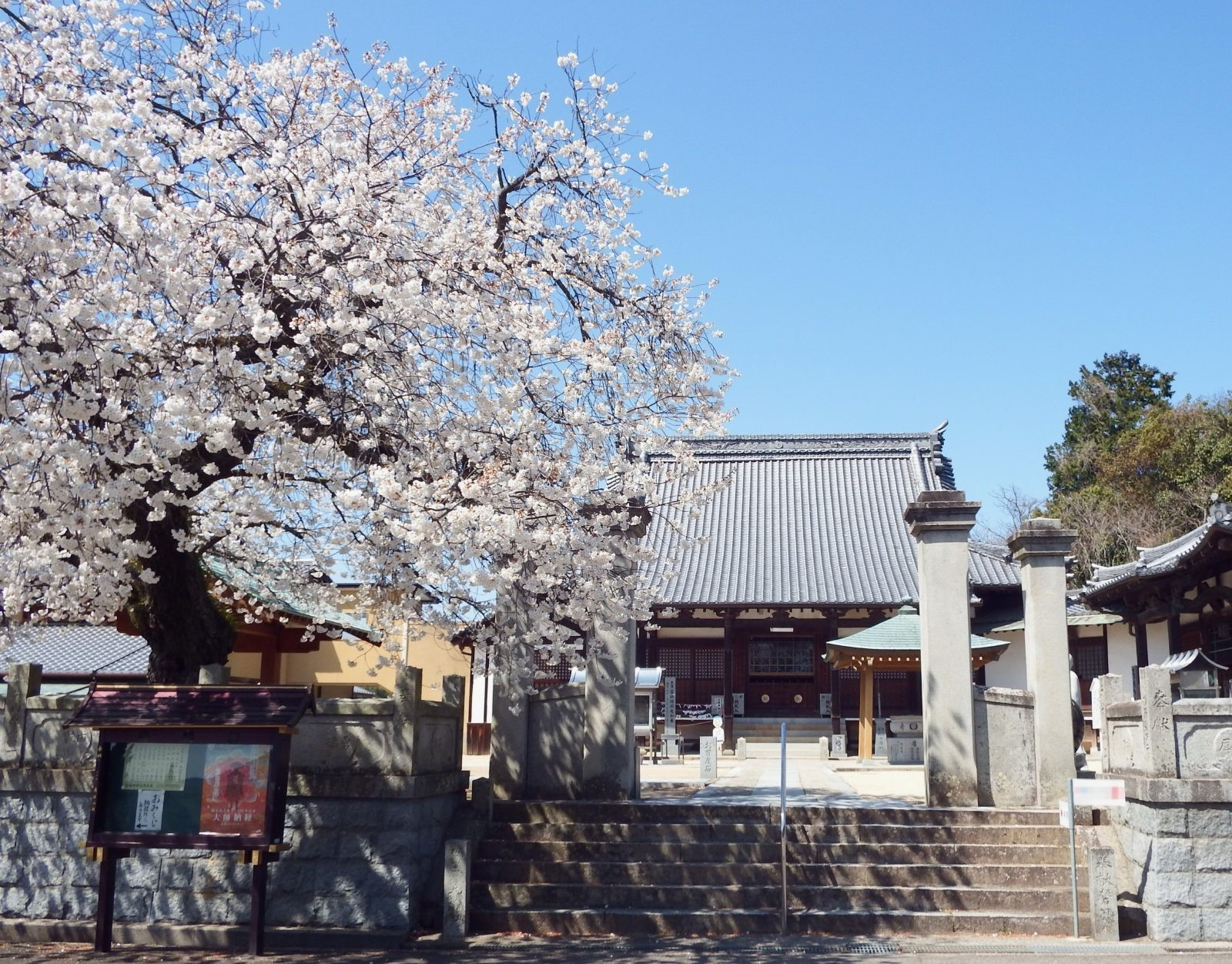
- Iyo Kokubun-ji

- Iyo Kokubun-ji Iyo Kokubun-ji (Japan)

Religion
- Affiliation: Buddhist
- Deity: Yakushi Nyorai
- Rite: Shingon Risshu

Location
- Location: 4-1-33, Kokubun-cho, Imabari-shi, Ehime-ken
- Country: Japan
- Coordinates: 34°1′34.2″N 133°1′31.6″E

Architecture
- Founder: c.Gyōki
- Completed: c.741
- National Historic Site of Japan

Iyo Kokubun-ji (伊予国分寺) is a Buddhist temple located in the city of Imabari, Ehime Prefecture, Japan. It belongs to the Shingon Risshu sect, and its honzon is a statue of Yakushi Nyorai. Its full name is Kongō-zan Saishō-in Kokubun-ji (金光山最勝院国分寺). It is the successor to the Nara period provincial temple of former Iyo Province and Temple 59 on the Shikoku 88 temple pilgrimage. The foundation stones of its Nara period pagoda were designated a National Historic Site in 1921.

== History ==
The Shoku Nihongi records that in 741, as the country recovered from a major smallpox epidemic, Emperor Shōmu ordered that a monastery and nunnery be established in every province, the kokubunji (国分寺). These temples were built to a semi-standardized template, and served both to spread Buddhist orthodoxy to the provinces, and to emphasize the power of the Nara period centralized government under the Ritsuryō system.

The exact circumstances of the Iyo Kokubun-ji's foundation are uncertain. According to temple legend, it was founded in 741 by Gyōki, and during the time of its third abbot, Kūkai visited and donated images of the Godai Myōō. Later, Shinnyo donated a set of the Lotus Sutra. The temple first appears in historical documentation, in the Shoku Nihongi, which records that in 756 Buddhist implements were bestowed on the provincial temples of 26 provinces, including Iyo. The area around Iyo Kokubun-ji was the location of the provincial government office of Iyo Province; however, the original temple was destroyed several times over its history, including in the Fujiwara no Sumitomo Rebellion in 939, the Genpei War in 1184, and the fire caused by Hosokawa Yoriyuki in 1364, and during Chōsokabe Motochika's invasion in 1584, and the modern temple is now on the ruins of the provincial government offices, whereas the original temple is located to the east. The foundation stones of the east pagoda of the original remain in situ approximately 100 meters east of the present temple. The foundation is a square with sides of 17.4 meters, and 12 cornerstones remain, of which the central cornerstone, the three side pillar cornerstones in the northeast corner, and the four heavenly pillars in the northwest are still in their original positions, while the rest have moved or tilted. A six meter-wide level area was confirmed 27 meters south of the central stone, which is thought to be the southern corridor, sandwiched between two ditches, four meters wide on the north side and six meters wide on the south side. The Hondō of the current temple was rebuilt in 1789, and the shoin of the temple preserves temple treasures and cultural assets from the Nara period to the early Heian period, as well as items excavated from the site of the original temple.

The temple is about a 20-minute walk from Iyo-Sakurai Station on the JR Shikoku Yosan Line.

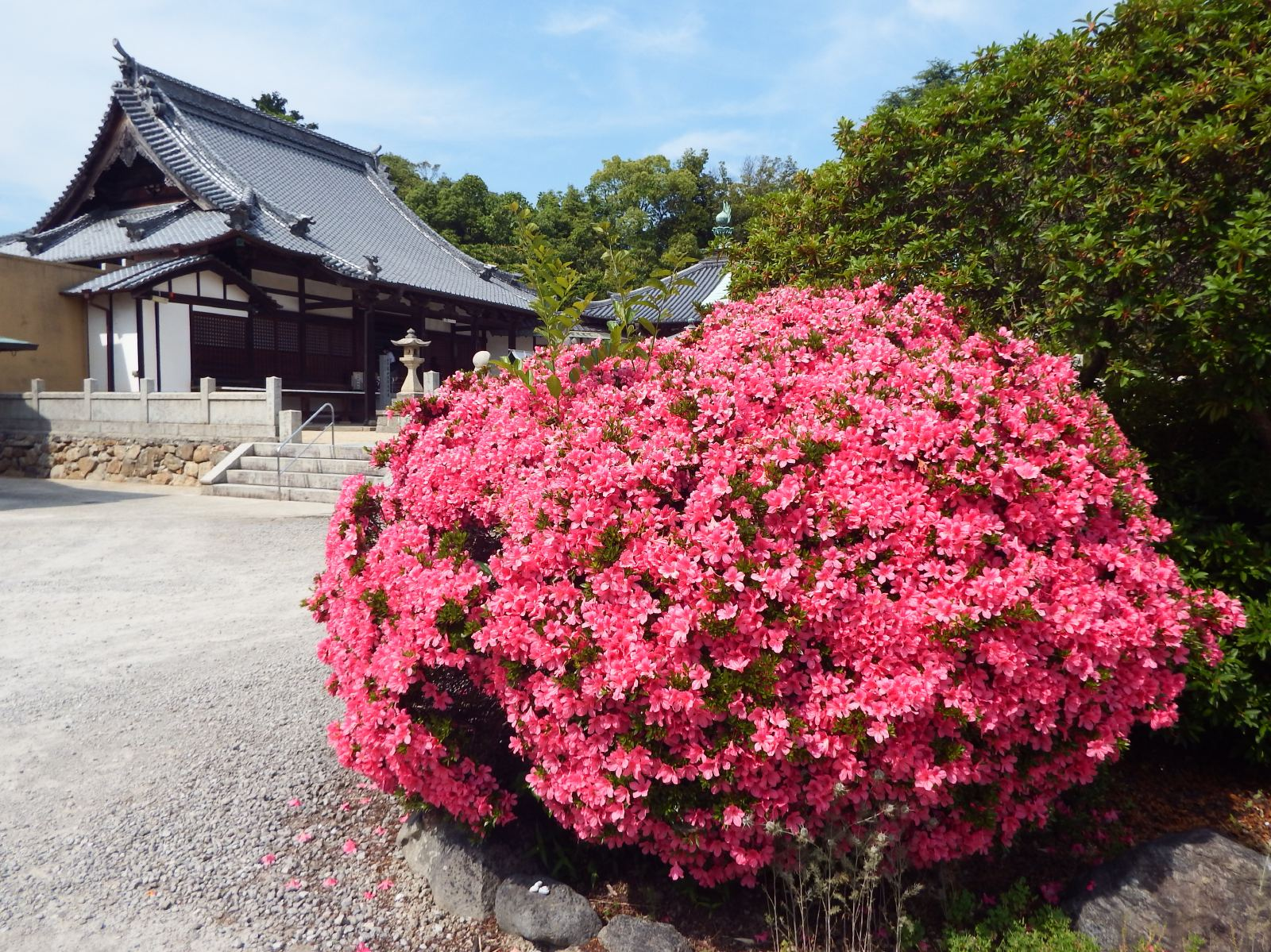
Hondō

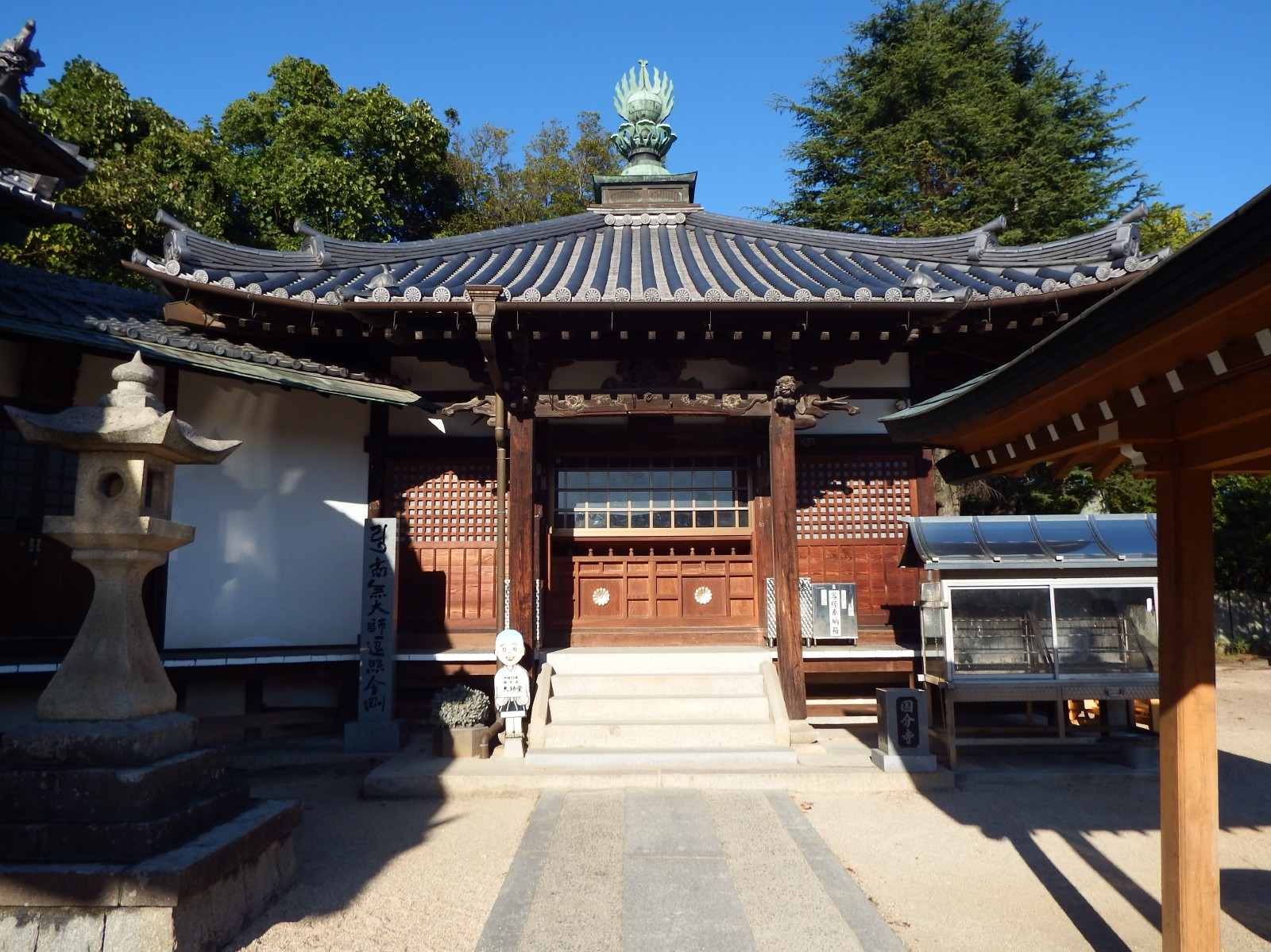
Daishi-dō

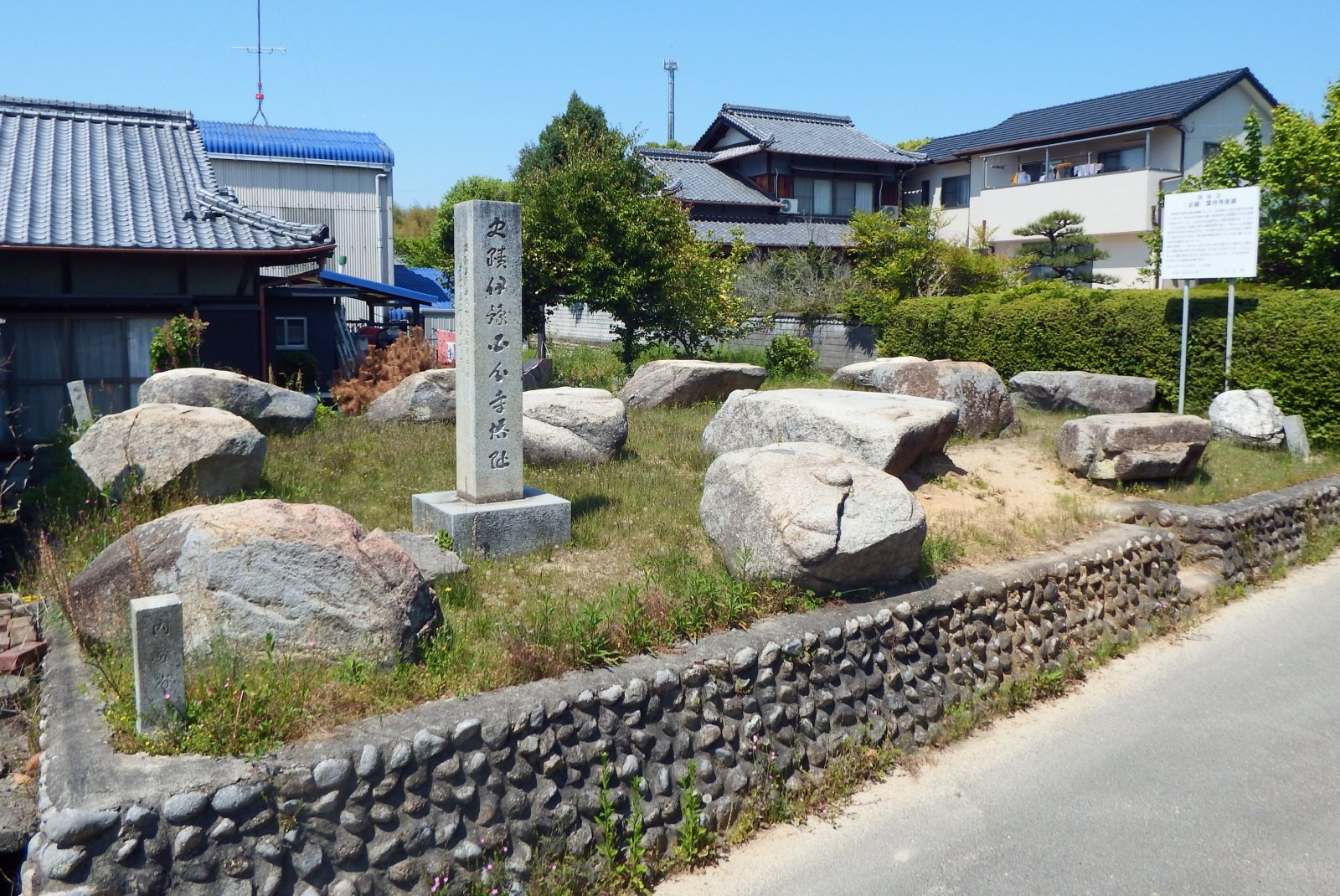
Foundations of the Nara period pagoda

== See also ==
- Provincial temple
- Shikoku 88 temple pilgrimage
- List of Historic Sites of Japan (Ehime)
