= Ryuukou-ji =

Coordinates: 33.2952°N 132.5986°E

Ryuukou-ji (Japanese: 龍光寺) is a temple in Uwajima, Ehime Prefecture, Japan. It belongs to the Shingon-shū Omuro-ha sect of Japanese Buddhism. It is Temple # 41 on the Shikoku 88 temple pilgrimage. The main image is of Jūichimen Kannon (Ekādaśamukha).

== History ==
According to temple tradition, when Kukai (Kobo Daishi) was traveling through this area, he encountered a white-haired old man. From his words and actions, he realized that the old man was an incarnation of the Five Grains Great Deity, and carved and enshrined a statue of Inari Myojin. He carved an eleven-faced Kannon Bodhisattva as the principal deity, with Fudo Myoo and Bishamonten as attendant deities, and established the temple as the guardian temple of the Shikoku pilgrimage.

Originally located in Inarida (approximately 0.5 km (0.31 mi) southeast of the current location), it was destroyed by fire, and by the time Sumizen visited in 1653, only a small hall remained in the middle of a rice field.In the first year of the Genroku era (1688), the shrine was relocated to its current site—formerly the location of the Hirota Grove. An Inari shrine was erected at the center of the upper terrace, with a Kannon Hall positioned to its east and a Daishi Hall on the lower terrace below. By the mid-Edo period—roughly the time *Shikoku Henreisho Meisho Zue* (Illustrated Guide to Famous Pilgrimage Sites in Shikoku) was published in 1800—the landscape had taken on the form seen today, and the site was widely cherished as "Sangen no Inari," a place where Shinto and Buddhist traditions harmoniously coexisted. During the early Edo period, Ryūkō-ji Temple had already been established as a *jingū-ji* (shrine-temple complex) under the name "Rikkō-ji."

Following the Meiji-era separation of Shinto and Buddhism, the site was divided into an Inari Shrine and this temple. The former Main Hall became the shrine building for the Inari Shrine; consequently, the statue of Inari Daimyōjin—previously enshrined in the old Main Hall—was relocated to the right side of the new Main Hall constructed on the lower grounds, while the statue of the Eleven-faced Kannon—previously enshrined in the old Kannon Hall—was moved to the center to serve as the principal deity.Furthermore, the inscription on the *Nōkyō* (pilgrimage receipt)—which had previously read "Main Shrine: Inari Daimyōjin; Honji: Eleven-faced Kannon"—was changed to read "Principal Deity: Eleven-faced Kannon."

== Temple grounds ==
- Stone Torii Gate: Entrance to the approach
- Komainu (Guardian Dogs): Entrance to the temple grounds
- Main Hall: The original Eleven-Faced Kannon is a standing statue, but the current principal image that can be viewed is a painted seated statue. Both the original principal image and the Inari Myojin statue, said to be carrying five grains, are hidden Buddha images, and the stone said to be the eye of a dragon is also a hidden treasure, and the current head priest has never seen any of them.
- Daishi Hall: The statue of Daishi can be viewed. A golden Peacock King is enshrined here. There are stairs leading up to the corridor on the right.
- Bell Tower
- Mizuko Jizo Stone Statue
- Seven Lucky Gods

A stone torii gate stands at the entrance to the approach. Proceeding along the approach lined with houses on both sides and climbing the stone steps leads to the temple grounds where guardian dogs are placed. The bell tower is on the left, and the Mizuko Jizo statue is on the right. Further on, the main hall stands on the left, and the Daishi Hall is on the right. The sutra copying office is to the left of the main hall. After passing through the red torii gate and climbing further up the stone steps, you will find the Inari Shrine.

- Temple lodging: None
- Parking: 12 spaces. Free.
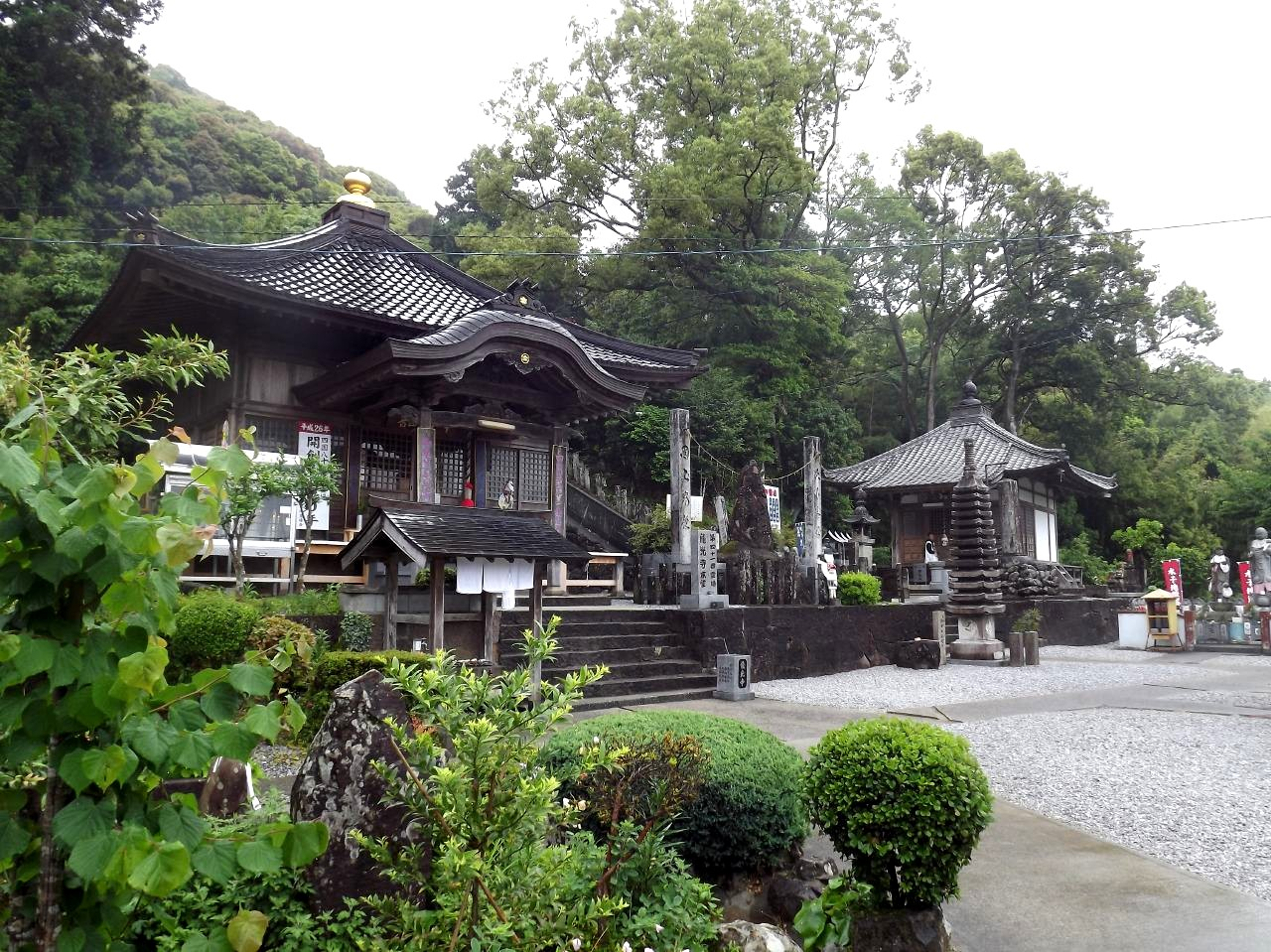
Temple Grounds

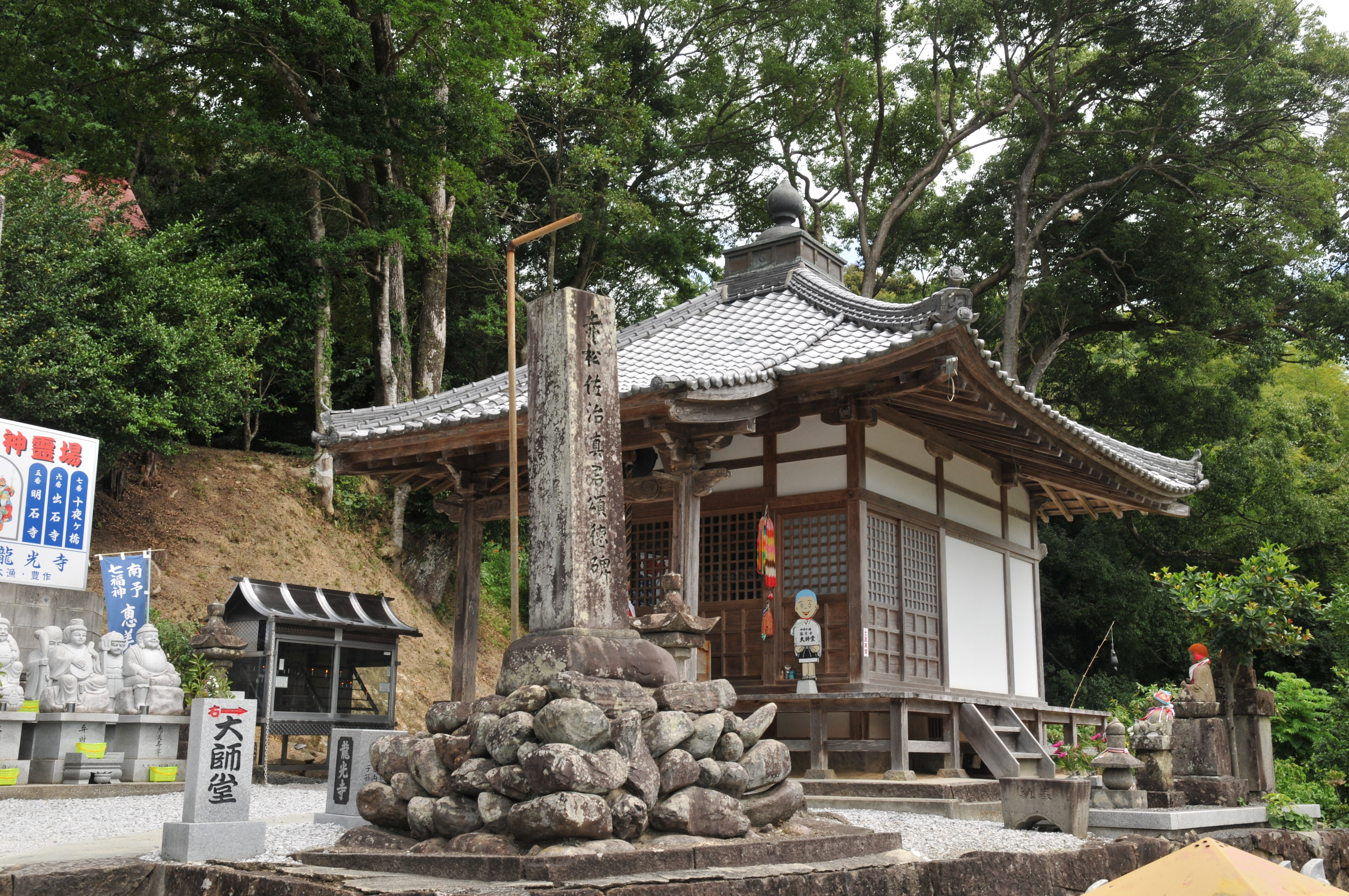
Daishidō (Master's Hall)

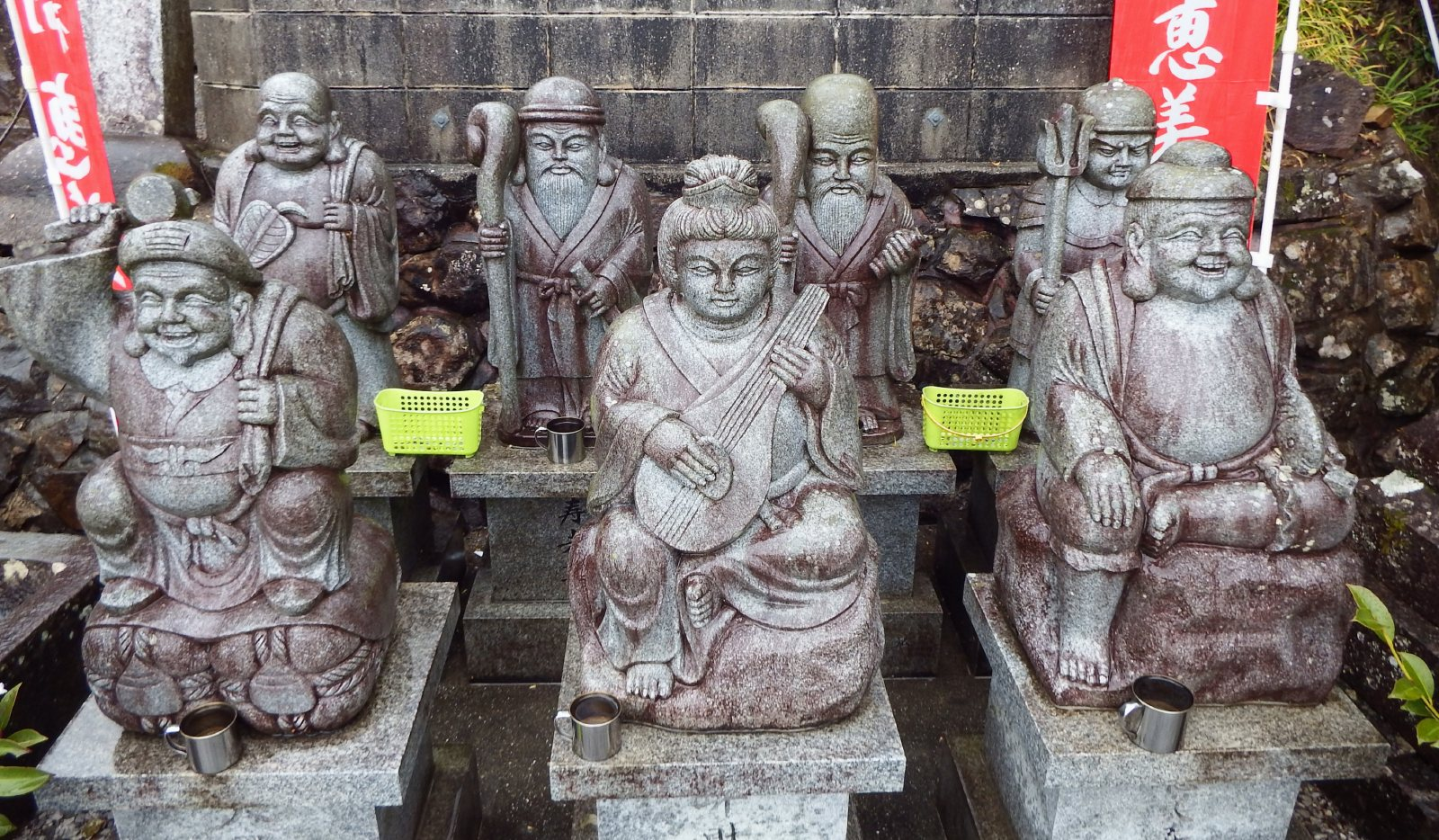
The Seven Lucky Gods

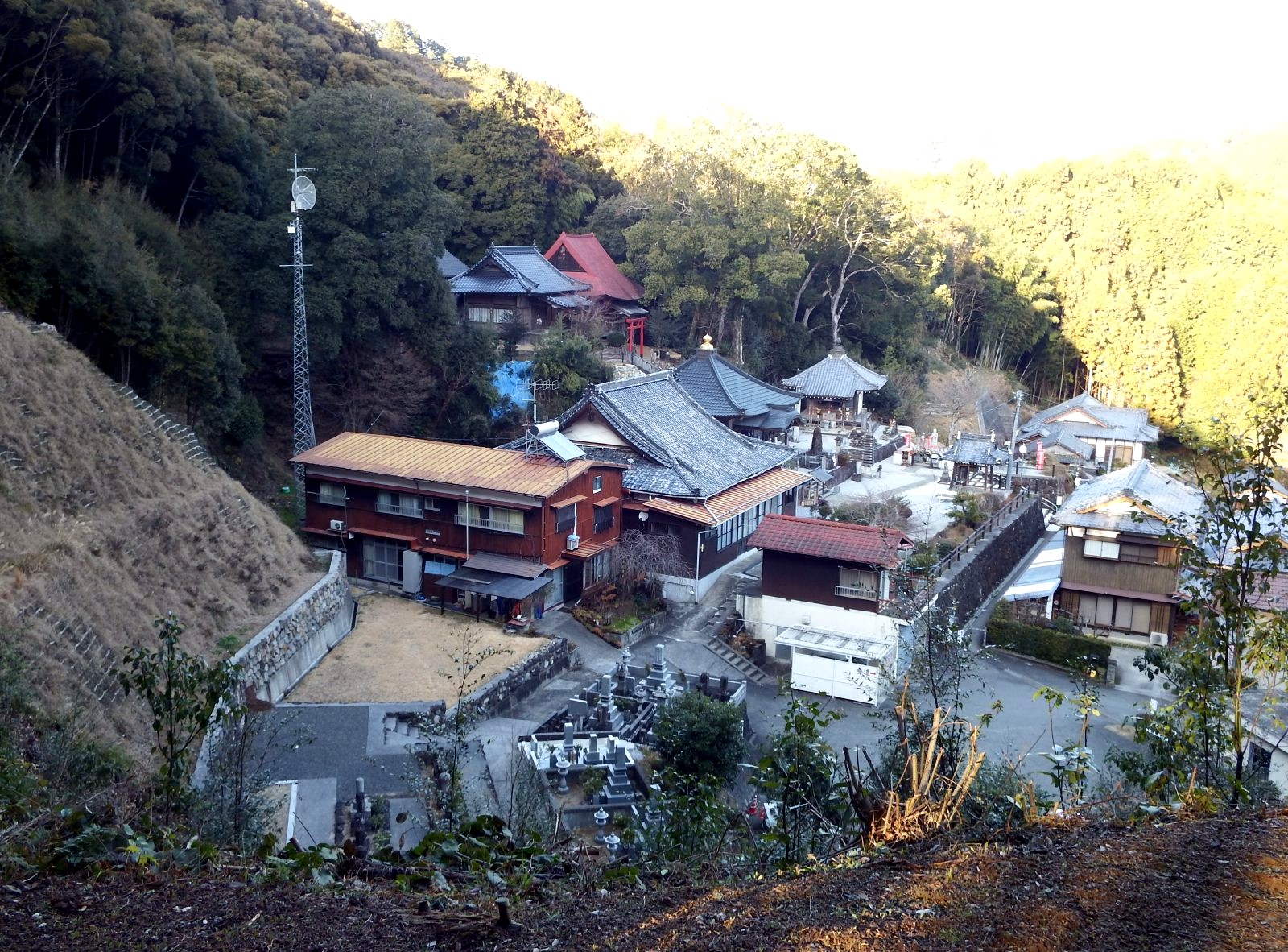
Panoramic View

== Inari Shrine ==
Since its founding, the site was revered as an Inari Temple—a place where Shinto and Buddhist beliefs were syncretically intertwined; however, following the Decree Separating Shinto and Buddhism, the former Main Hall was redesignated as the "Inari Shrine".

- Inari Shrine: The principal deity enshrined here is Toyoukehime-no-Mikoto, with Sarutahiko-no-Mikoto and Omiyanome-no-Okami enshrined as subsidiary deities.
- Hirota Shrine: Former Kannon Hall
- Small Shrine
- Miniature Shrine
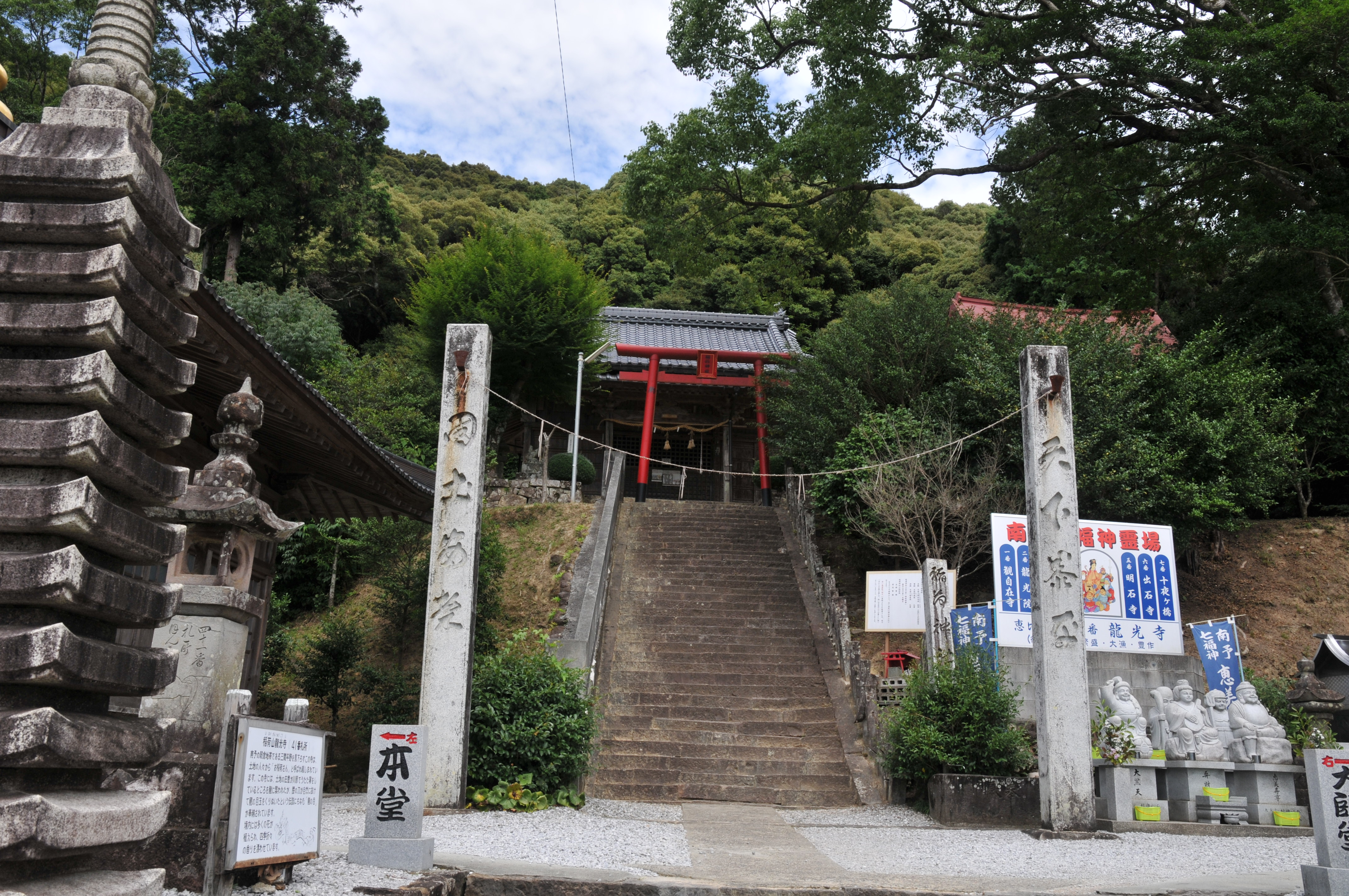
Inari Shrine

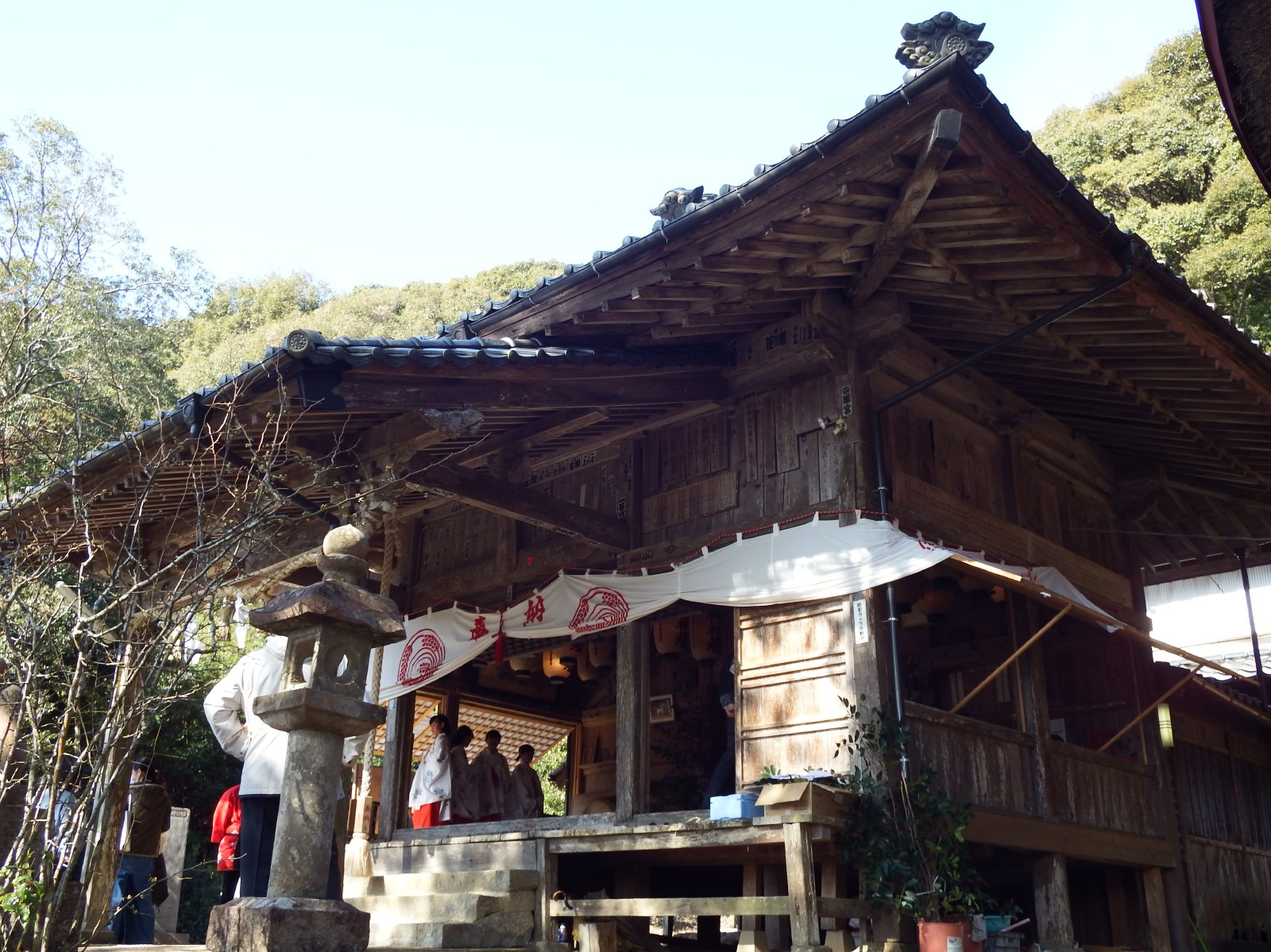
Haiden (Former Main Hall)

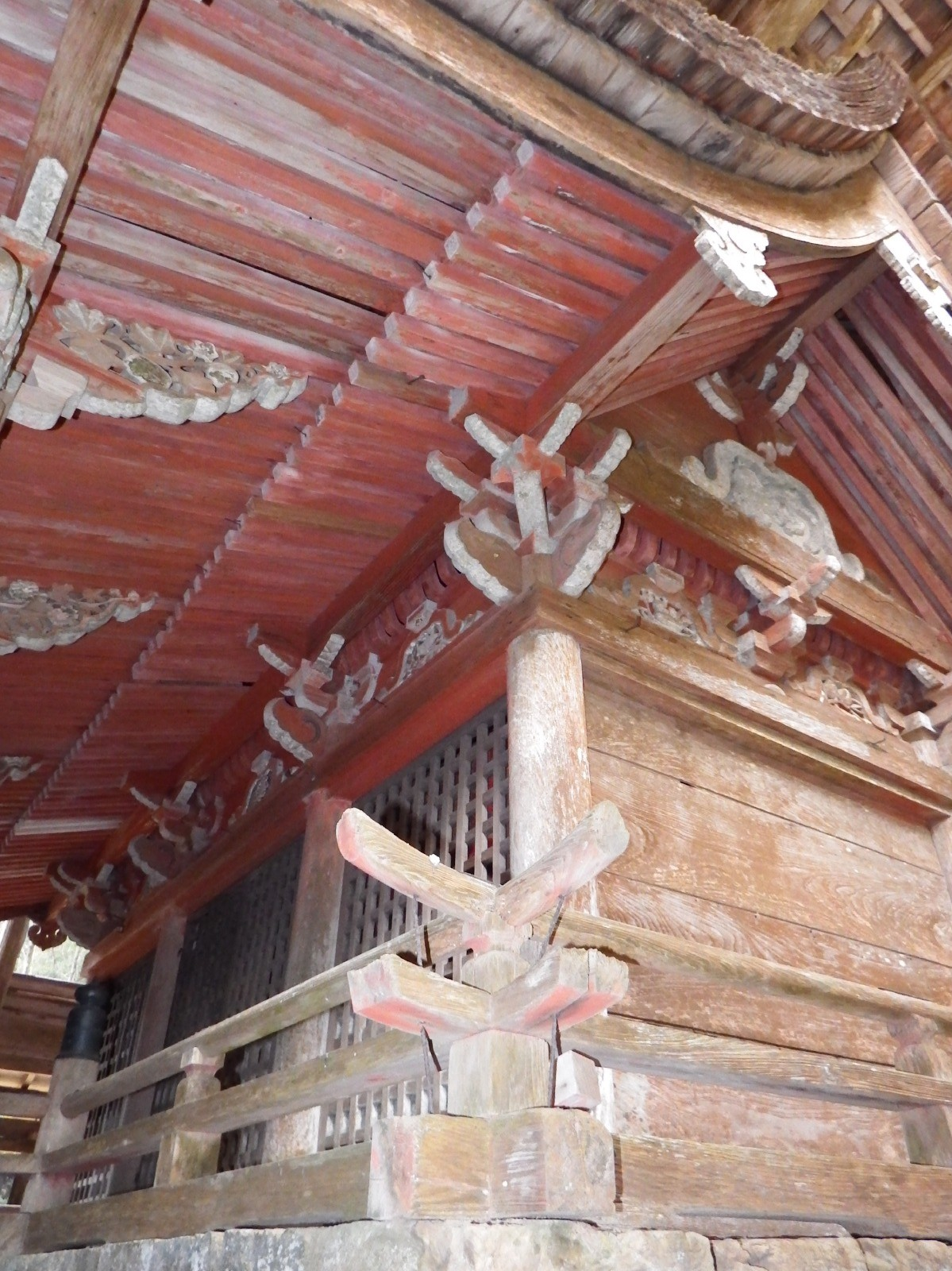
Honden (City Cultural Property)

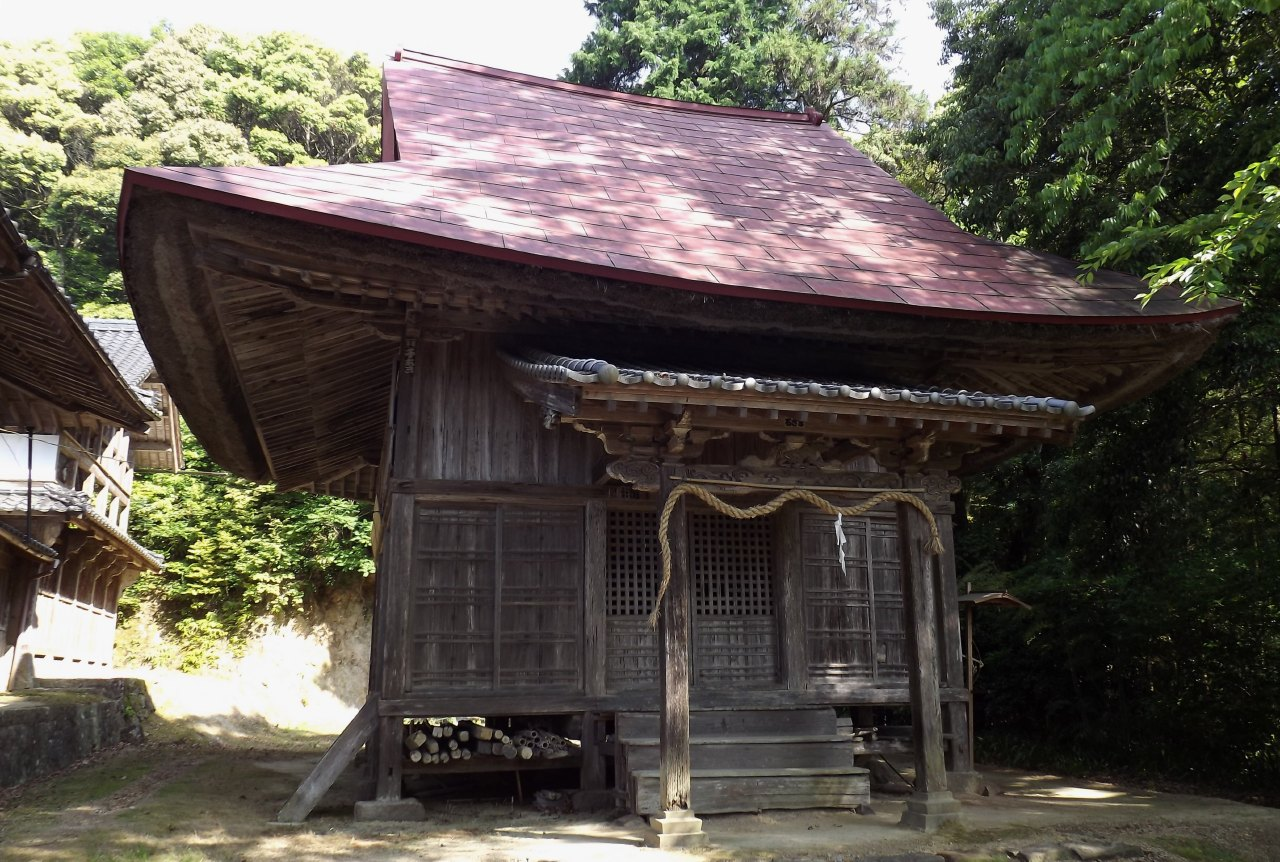
Hirota Shrine (Former Kannon Hall)

== Cultural properties ==
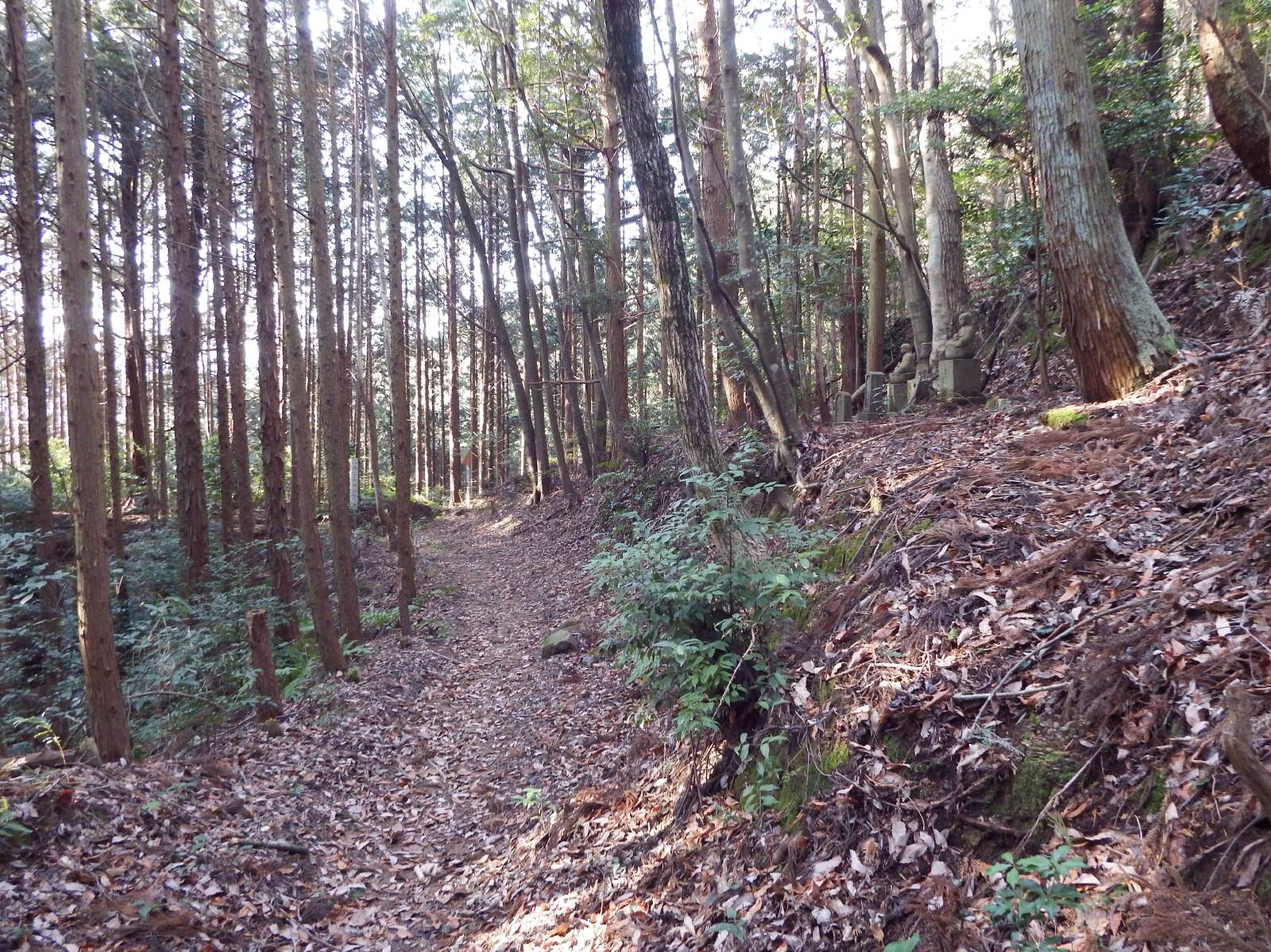
Butsumokuji Road

=== National Historic Site ===
- Iyo Pilgrimage Route: Inari Shrine Precinct and Ryūkō-ji Temple Precinct — 2.749453 ha. Designated October 13, 2017.
- Iyo Pilgrimage Route: Butsumokuji Path
  - Located 27 meters in front of the temple's Main Hall. Designated as an additional site on October 13, 2017.
  - A mountain path, approximately 450 meters in length, that traverses the western ridge of this temple grounds and leads to Prefectural Road 31. Designated on October 3, 2016.

=== Designated tangible cultural property of the city ===
- Inari Shrine Main Sanctuary (One Structure): Designated on August 1, 2003. The owner is Inari Shrine.

According to tradition, the Inari Shrine in Kyoto was formally invited and enshrined in the area known as Inarida in the second year of the Daidō era (807); subsequently, in the first year of the Genroku era (1688), it is said to have been relocated to its current site within the Hirota Shrine precincts. The structure features a *nagare-zukuri* (stream-style) design with a three-bay frontage and a *kokera-buki* (shingle) roof. The building is estimated to date from the early 18th century. As the Main Sanctuary is housed within a protective shelter, it remains in an excellent state of preservation.

== Access ==
=== Railway ===
Shikoku Railway Company (JR Shikoku) Yodo Line – Mutsuwa Station (1.5 km); Yodo Line – Iyo-Miyano-shita Station (1.5 km)

=== Bus ===
Uwajima Bus: Alight at "Morigahana" (0.8 km)

=== Road ===
Local Road: Ehime Prefectural Route 31 (Uwa-Mima Line) – Ryukoji Temple (1.2 km)

== Preceding and following temples ==
=== Shikoku 88 temple pilgrimage ===
40 Kanjizai-ji -- (50.2 km) -- 41 Ryūkō-ji -- (2.6 km) -- 42 Butsumoku-ji

- Note: There are multiple routes for the pilgrimage path; the distances listed above are based on the standard route.

== See also ==
- Shikoku 88 temple pilgrimage

== Bibliography ==
- Shikoku 88ヶ所霊場会, ed. (2006). 先達教典 (in Japanese). Shikoku 88ヶ所霊場会.
- 宮崎建樹 (2007). Shikoku Pilgrimageひとり歩き同行二人 (in Japanese). Vol. 地図編 (第8版 ed.). へんろみち保存協力会.
