= Butsumoku-ji =

Ichikayama Birushanain Butsumokuji
- 佛木寺
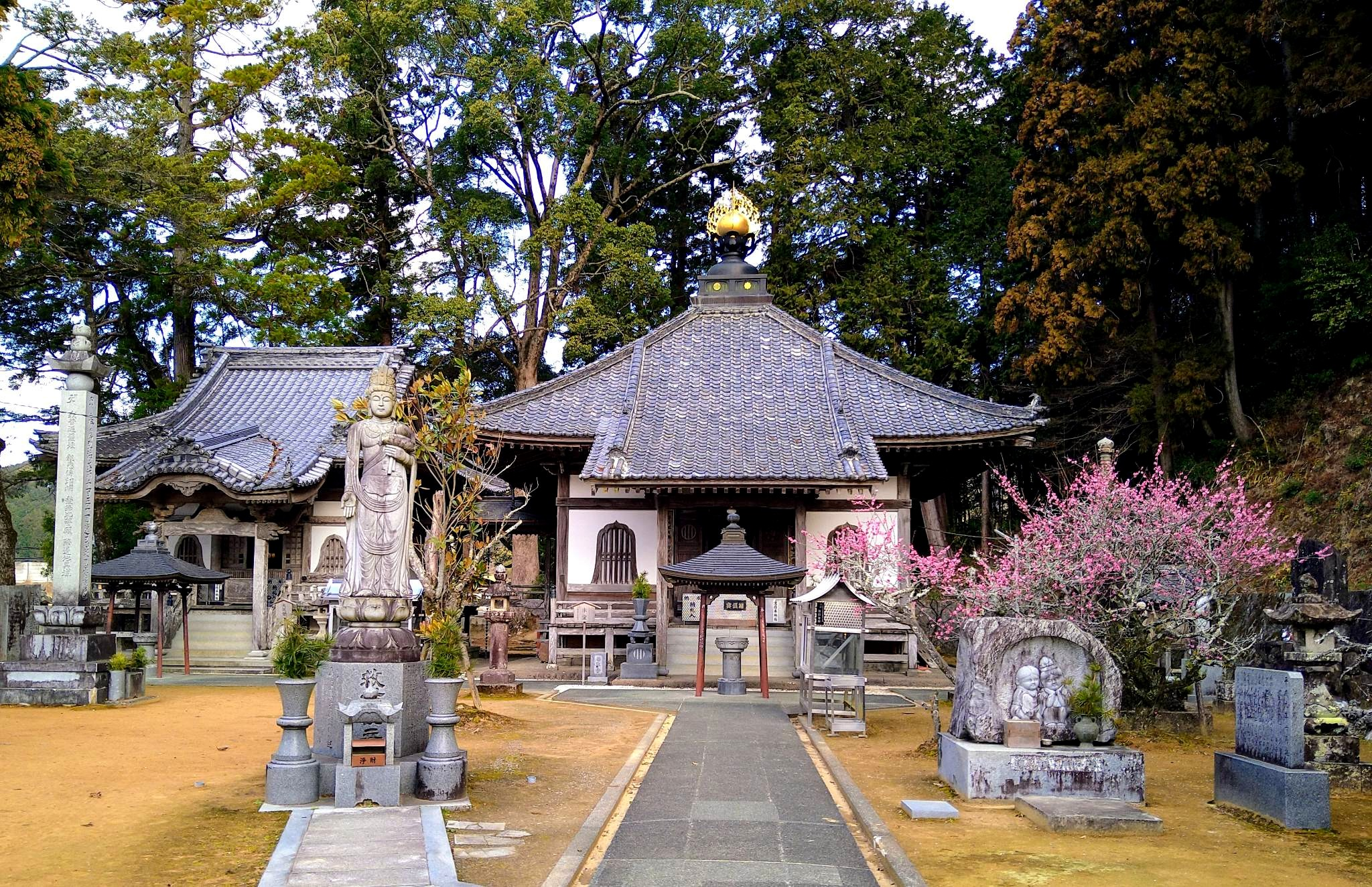
- Main Hall (Right) and Daishi Hall

Religion
- Affiliation: Buddhism other_info =: Sect: [[]]
- Prefecture: Ehime Prefecture
- Region: Ikkazan
- Deity: Dainichi Nyorai
- Year consecrated: 2nd year of the Daidō era (807)

Location
- Location: 33°18′38.1″N 132°34′53.3″E
- Country: Japan
- Interactive map of Ichikayama Birushanain Butsumokuji
- Prefecture: Ehime Prefecture

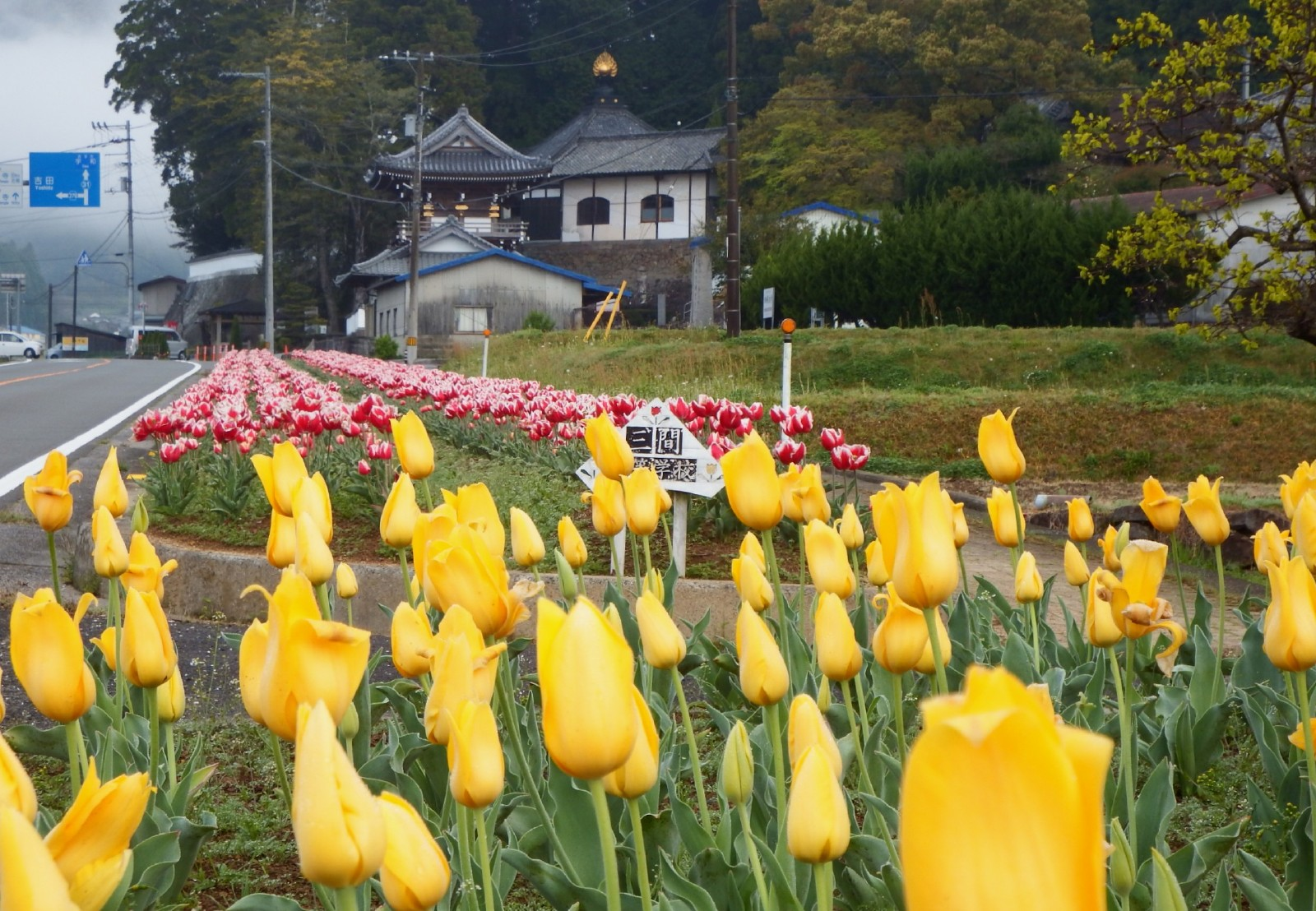
Surroundings

Bustumoku-ji (Japanese: 佛木寺) is a temple belonging to the Omuro School of Shingon Buddhism, located in Uwajima, Ehime Prefecture. Its formal mountain name is Ichika-zan, and it bears the honorary title Birushanain. The main image is of Dainichi Nyorai. It is Temple # 42 on the Shikoku 88 temple pilgrimage.

Mantra of the Principal Deity: Om Abiraunken Bazara Dadoban Pilgrimage Verse: At Butsumokuji, where even grass and trees may attain Buddhahood—how truly reassuring it is for all beings: demons, beasts, humans, and gods alike.

== Overview ==
Located just beyond this temple lies the Hachō Pass. For those traveling on foot, the route entails crossing a pass at an elevation of approximately 480 meters; even when utilizing the tunnel—completed in March 1970—one must still ascend to an elevation of 394 meters. Consequently, whether traveling by car or on foot (even via the tunnel), and particularly during the winter months when snowfall is a concern, this stretch of the journey was once a source of considerable anxiety. However, with the subsequent construction of the expressway, travelers by car can now reach the next pilgrimage site effortlessly in just about 20 minutes.

Residents of the local Soku district and students from Narutae Elementary School and Mima High School grow flowers along the prefectural road leading to the temple, including tulips in spring, portulaca in summer, and cosmos in autumn.

== History ==
According to legend, in the second year of the Daidō era (807), Kūkai (Kōbō-Daishi) encountered an elderly man leading an ox at this site. Acting upon the old man's suggestion, Kūkai mounted the ox and proceeded forward; there, he discovered a sacred jewel—which he had cast eastward in search of a destined sanctuary upon departing from Tang China—resting within the branches of a massive camphor tree. Recognizing this place as a sacred site, he is said to have carved a statue of Dainichi Nyorai from the camphor wood, embedded the sacred jewel in the deity's brow, and subsequently erected a temple building to establish the sanctuary. Because of the legend that he arrived at this location while riding upon the back of an ox, the temple is revered as a guardian sanctuary for livestock.

During the Kamakura period, the temple flourished as the bodaiji (family temple) of the Iyo Saionji clan, the feudal lords of the Uwajima domain. The statue of Kōbō-Daishi housed here bears an inscription within its interior stating, "Consecrated on the 5th day of the 10th month of the 4th year of the Shōwa era (1315)"; it is reputed to be the oldest extant statue of the Great Master in Japan to feature such an internal inscription. The Main Hall was constructed in the 13th year of the Kyōhō era (1728) by Date Murakata, the feudal lord of the Yoshida domain.

Every year on April 19—the temple's annual festival day—the principal image of the Great Master is unveiled for public viewing. Additionally, the current Fudō Hall originally served as the Great Master's Hall (Daishi-dō) and was relocated from its former site to its present location; the Maedachi (front-standing) statue of the Great Master now housed there was created concurrently with the construction of the current Great Master's Hall during the Shōwa era.

== Temple Grounds ==
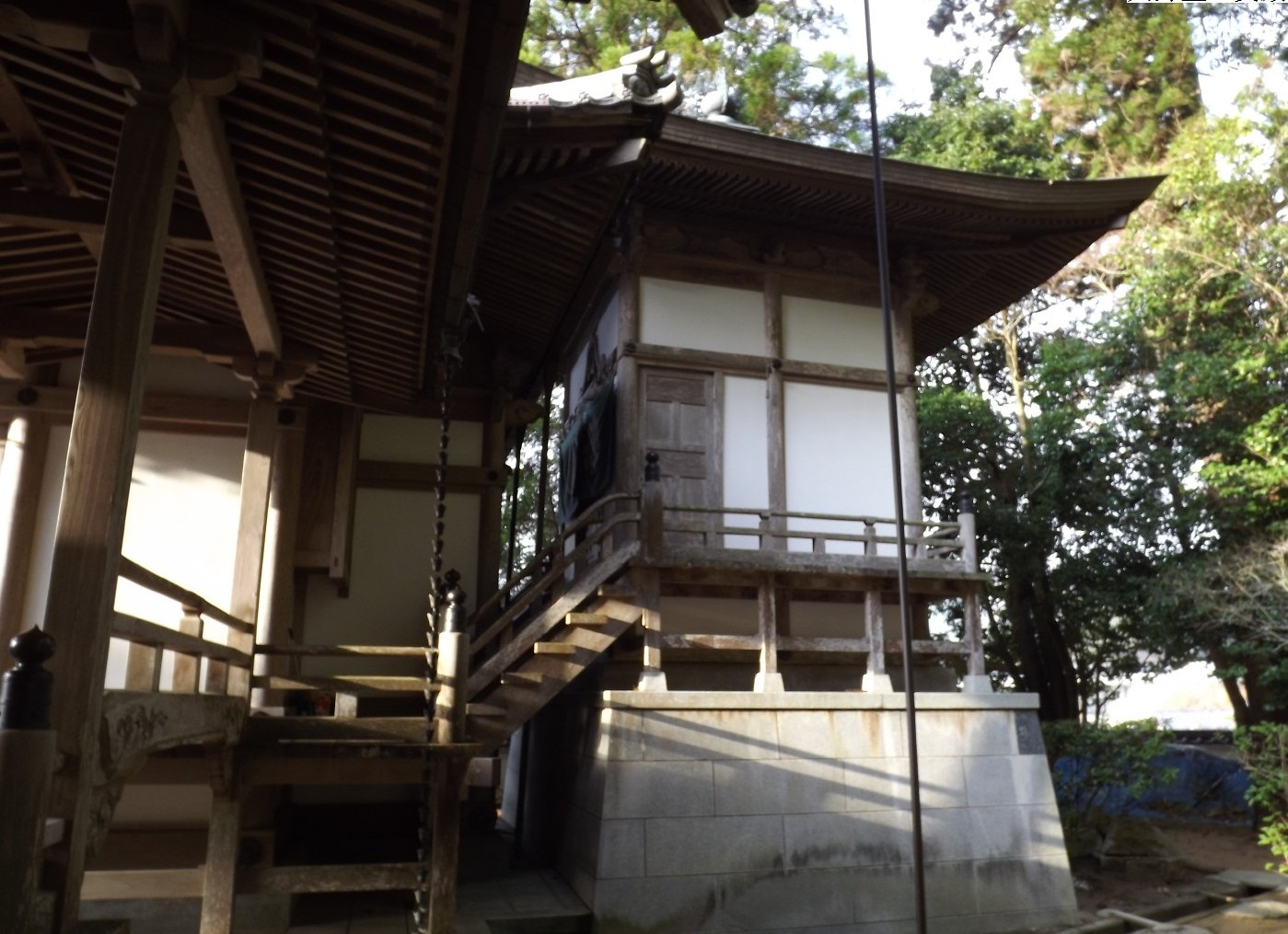
The Daishidō consists of a Front Hall and a Rear Hall.

- Sanmon (Nio-mon Gate) — A two-story gate featuring an irimoya (hip-and-gable) roof style. The previous gate was built in 1919; however, due to deterioration, it was completely rebuilt starting in May 2010, with the completion ceremony held on May 28, 2011.
- Main Hall — The principal deity enshrined here is illuminated during the first three days of the New Year.
- Daishi Hall — The Maedō (Front Hall) enshrines a white-painted statue of the Great Master (Kobo Daishi), while the Atodō (Rear Hall) enshrines a natural-wood statue of the Great Master, designated as a Prefectural Tangible Cultural Property.
- Shoro-do (Bell Tower) — A thatched-roof structure originally built during the Genroku era (1688–1704). The thatched roofing was completely renewed in 2014.
- Fudo Hall — Site where Goma (sacred fire rituals) are performed.
- Shotoku Taishi Hall
- Chinju / Myojin-gu (Shrine) — Located behind the Main Hall. It enshrines Amaterasu Omikami, Emperor Jimmu, and Sugawara no Michizane.
- Kachiku-do (Shrine) — Located to the right of the Main Hall; it is revered as the guardian shrine for cattle, horses, and other livestock.
- Zanboku-do (Shrine) — Located to the left of the Daishi Hall. It enshrines the leftover wood scraps used in the creation of the temple's principal deity statue.
- Irei-do (Shrine) — Located behind the Daishi Hall. It enshrines the spirits of Heike clan refugees who were buried in this area approximately 600 years ago.
- Stone Buddhas on the Temple Grounds — Includes statues of Kannon Bodhisattva, the Six Jizo, Dainichi Nyorai, the Seven Lucky Gods, the Ascetic Great Master, and others.
- Replica Stone Buddhas of the Saigoku 33 Kannon Pilgrimage — The trail begins behind the Myojin-gu shrine and ascends the mountain to the right. Established in December 1984 (Showa 59).

After climbing the stone steps from the prefectural road and passing through the Sanmon gate, the main approach to the temple turns to the left; however, if you continue straight ahead, you will find the thatched-roof Bell Tower and the Kuri (temple kitchen/quarters). A purification pavilion (Temizuya) is located on the right side of the main approach; after ascending a few more steps, you will find the Nokyo-jo (Pilgrim's Office) on the left, the Fudo Hall on the right, and the Shotoku Taishi Hall situated just beyond it. As you proceed along the approach path, you will pass a statue of Kannon Bodhisattva on your left; directly ahead stands the Main Hall, with the Daishi Hall situated to its left. To the right of the Main Hall is the Livestock Hall, and located behind and to the right of the Main Hall is the Guardian Shrine.

- Guest Hall: Enshrines a seated statue of Jizo Bodhisattva. Completed and consecrated on April 3, 2022.
- Temple Lodging (Shukubo): None available.
- Parking: Space for 30 standard vehicles and 5 large vehicles. Free of charge.
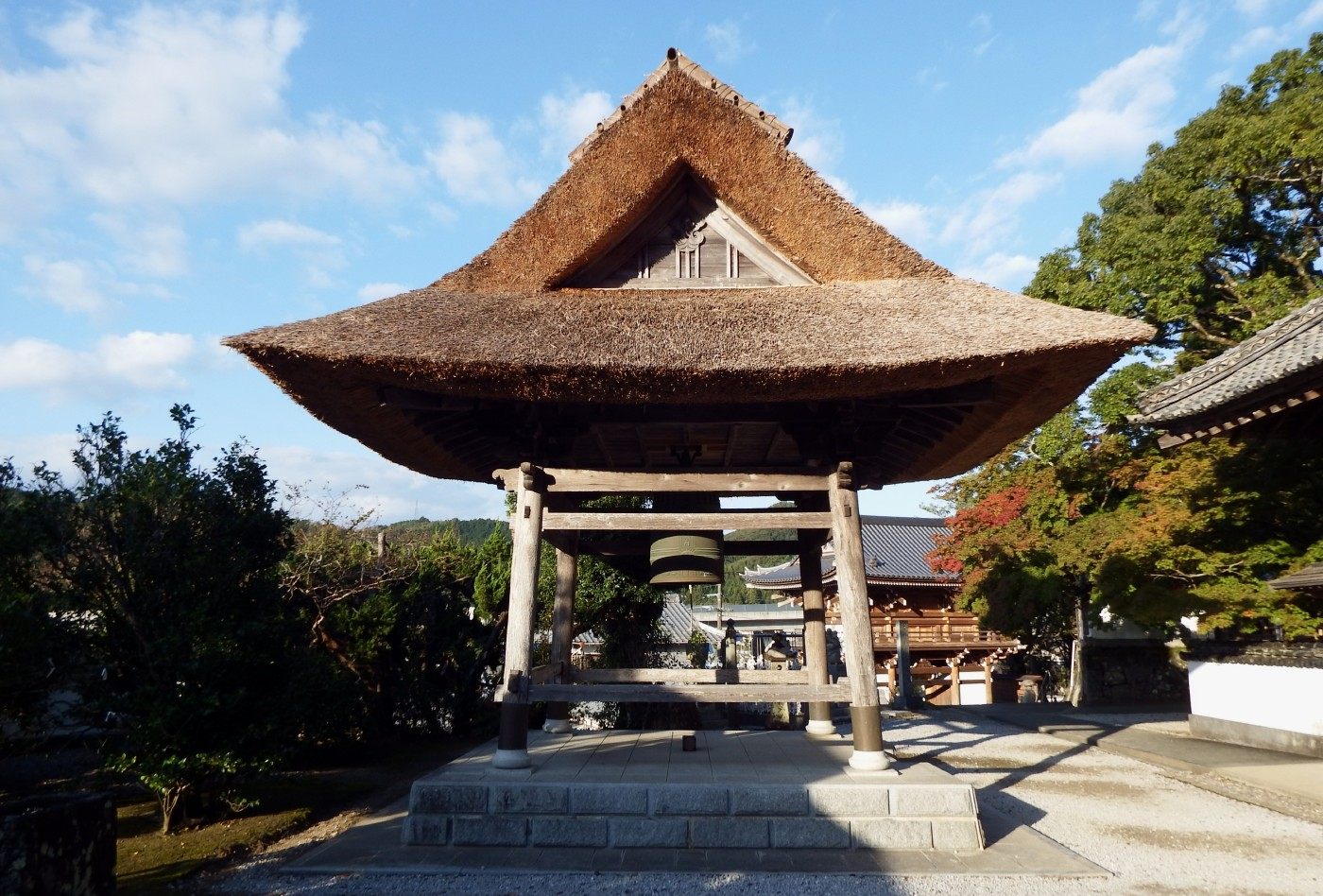
Thatched-roof Bell Tower

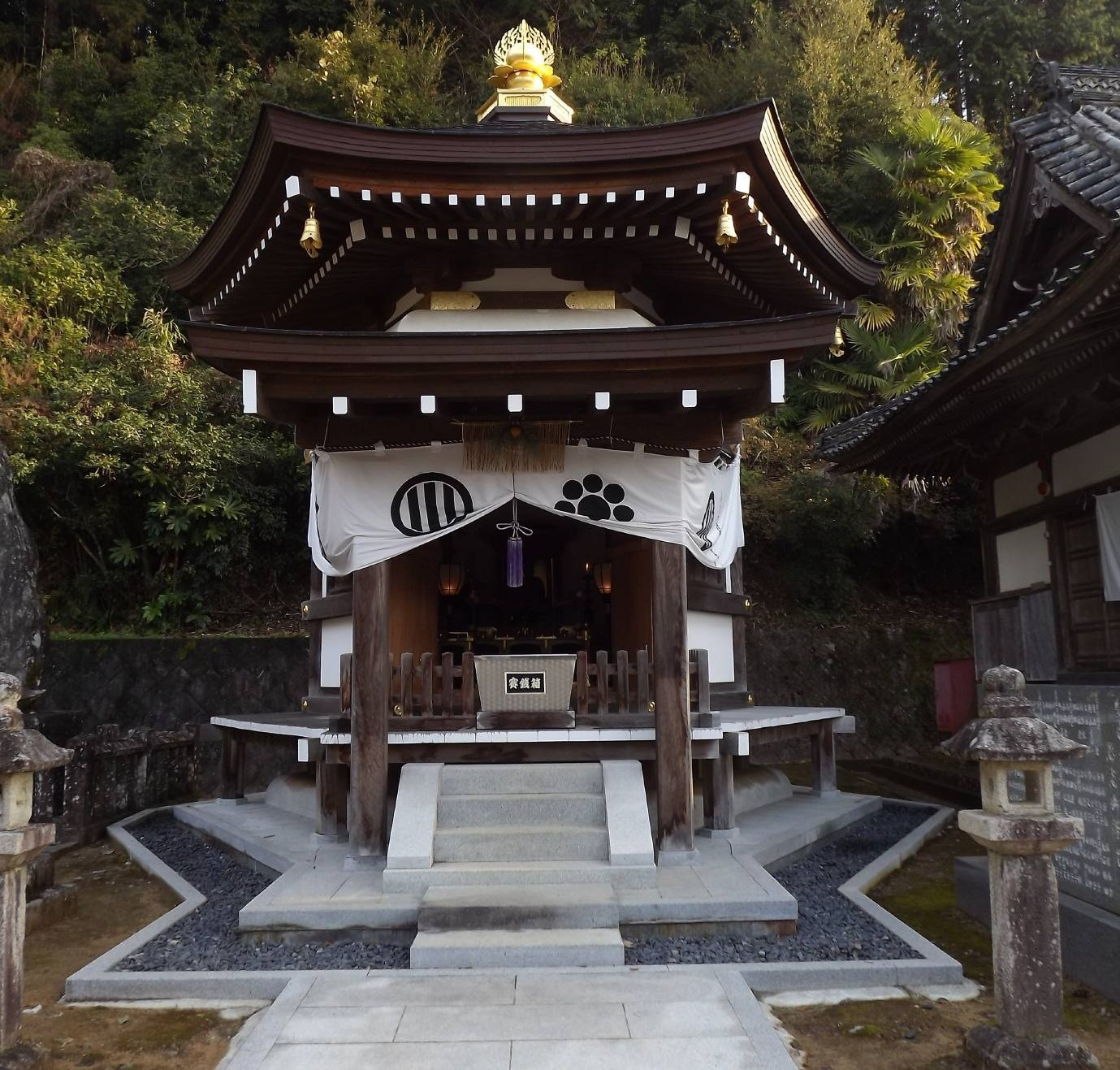
Prince Shotoku Hall

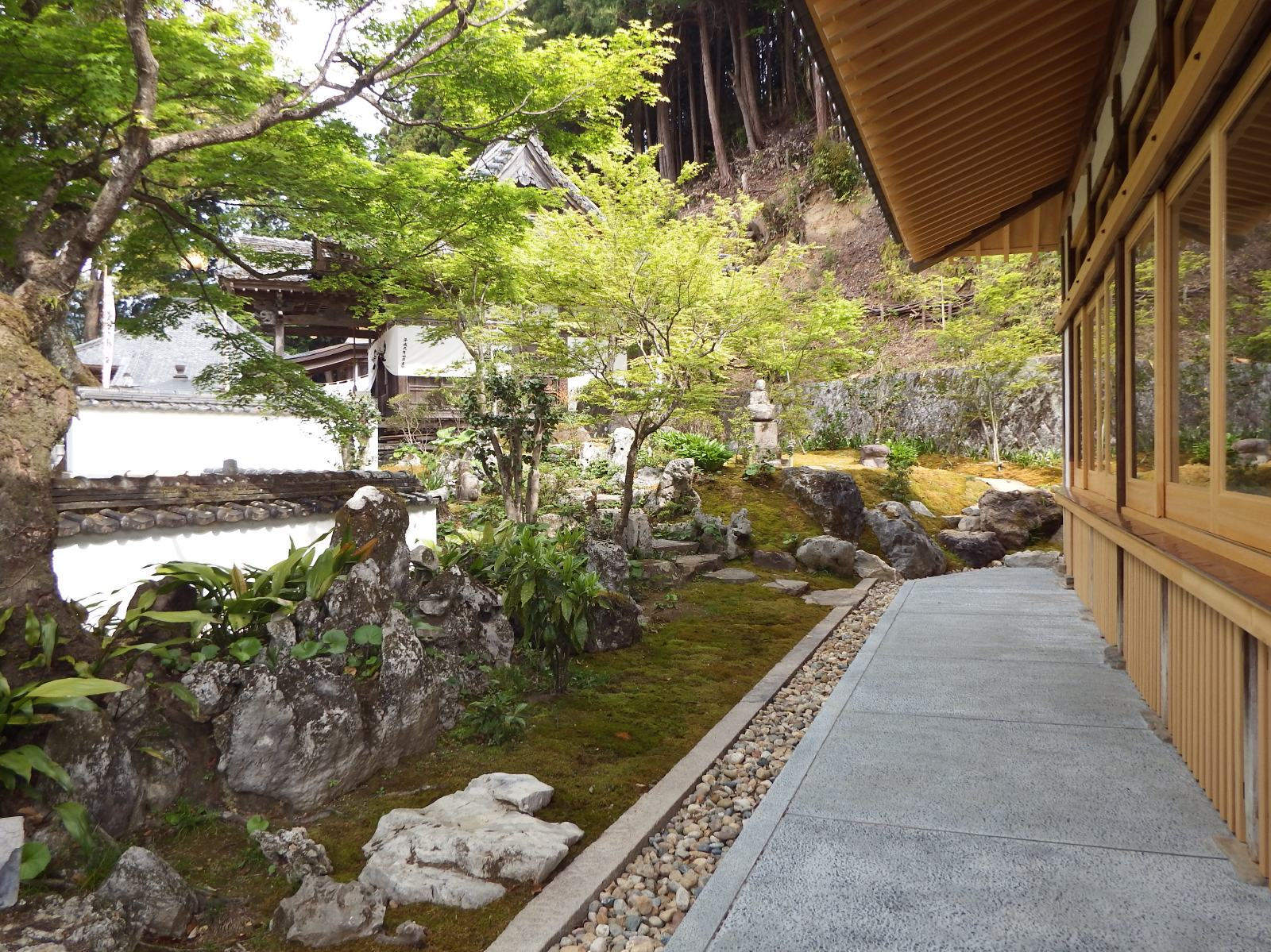
Fudo Hall, Garden, and Guest Hall

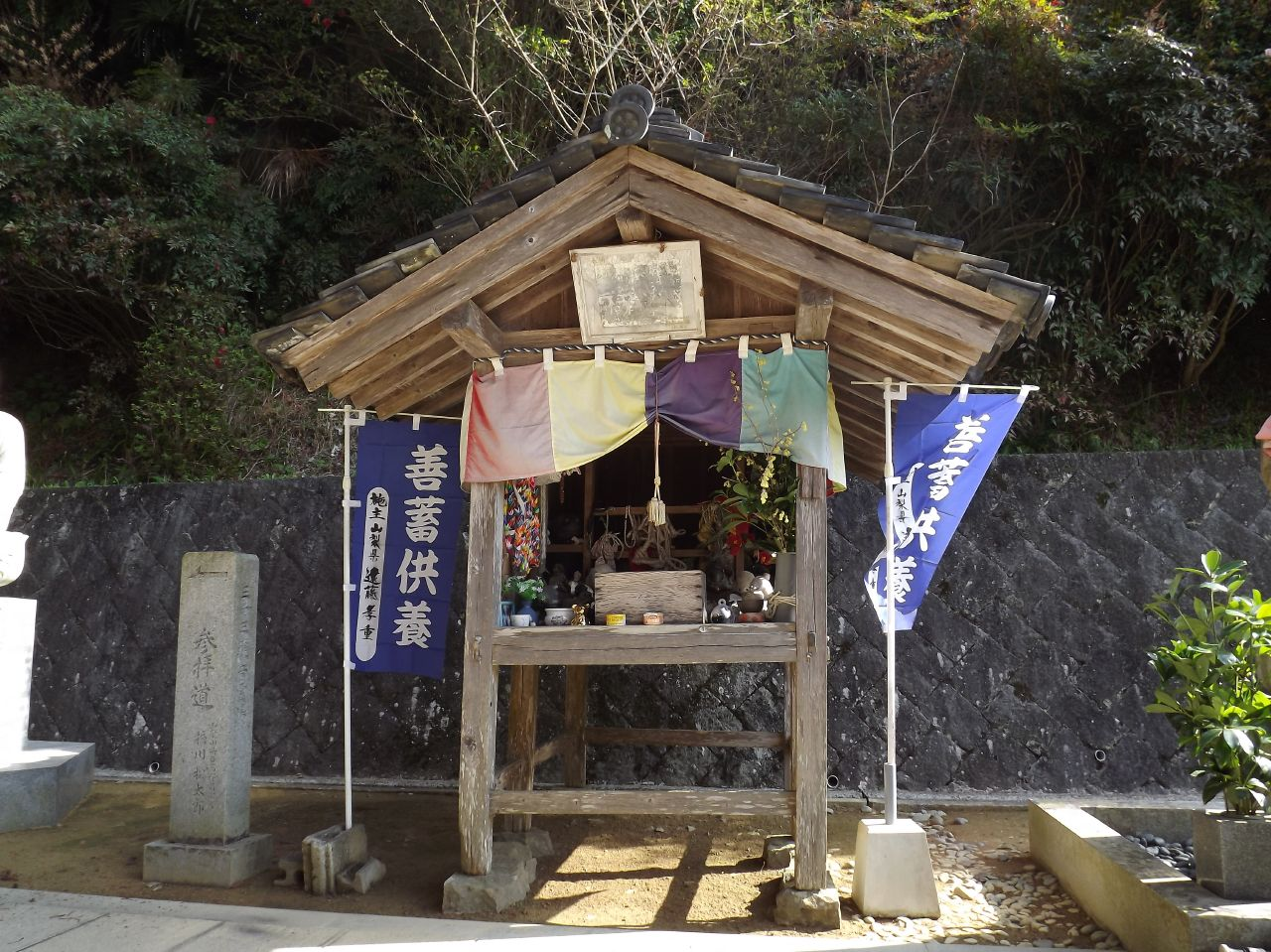
Livestock Hall

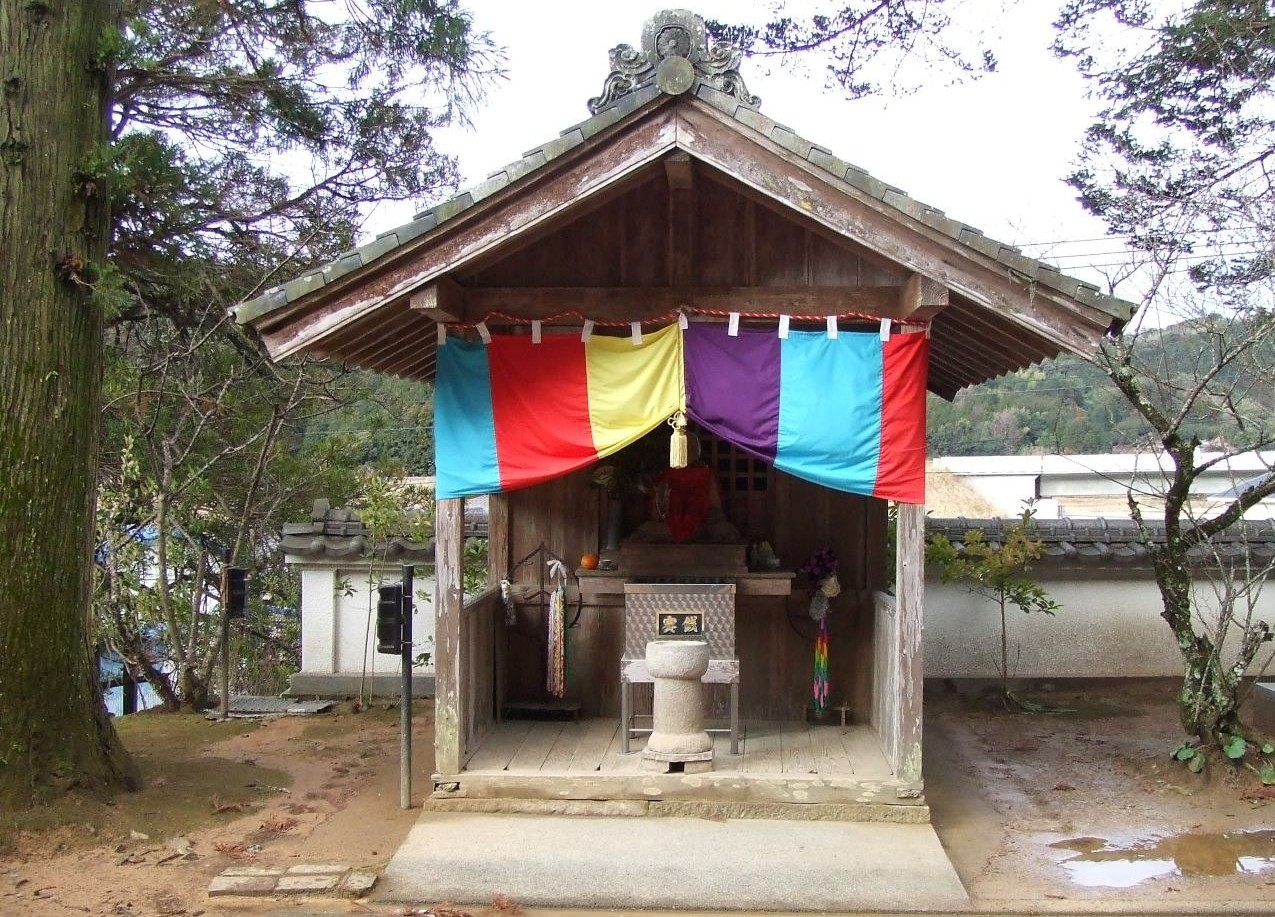
Zanboku Hall

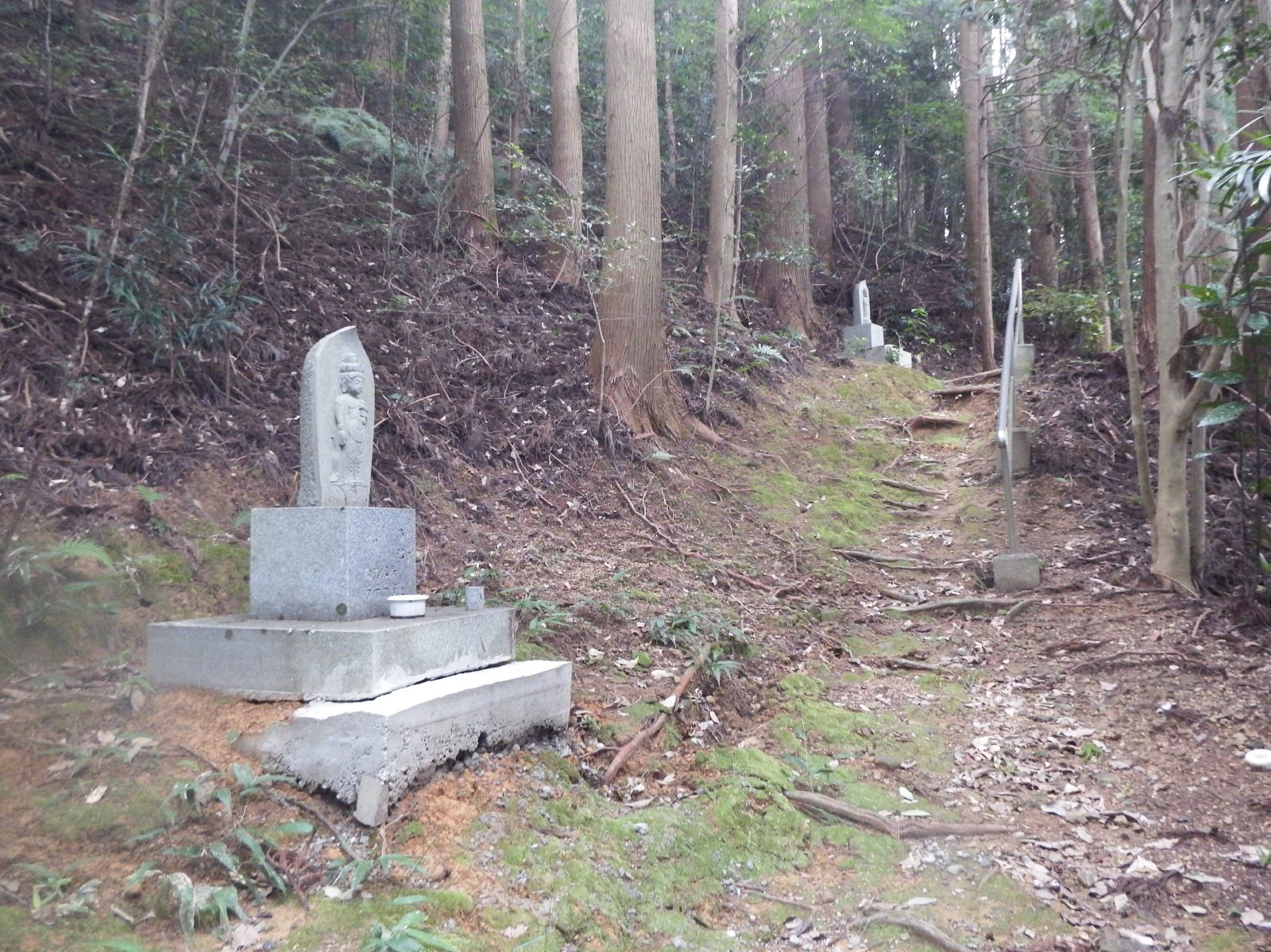
Butsumokuji: 33 Kannon Pilgrimage Sites

== Cultural Properties ==
=== National Historic Sites ===
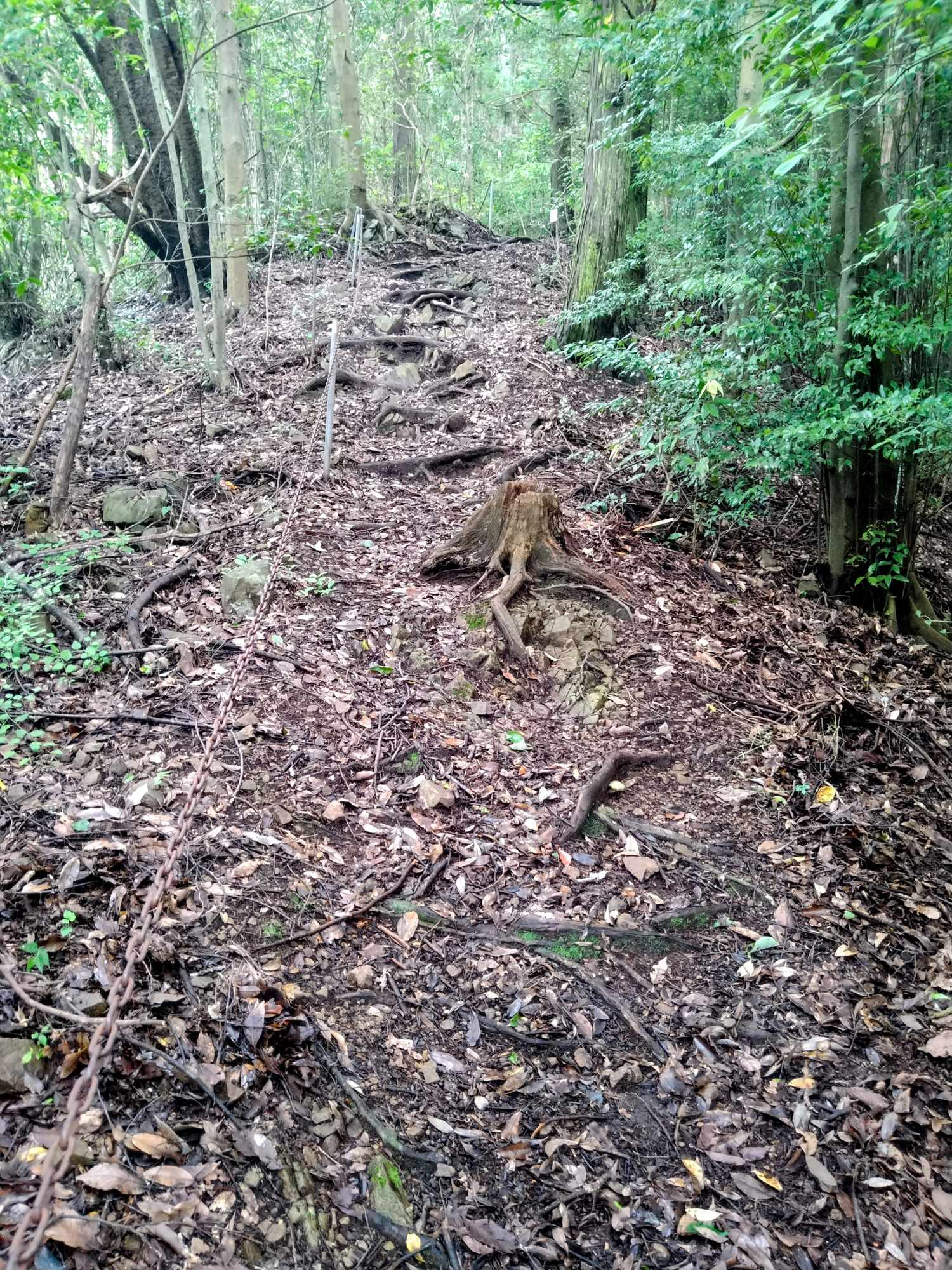
Pilgrimage route to Hanaga Pass

- Iyo Pilgrimage Route — Akashi-ji Temple Path: Designated February 21, 2024

Ascending Prefectural Road 31 toward Hanaga Pass in Uwajima City, one encounters the entrance to the pilgrimage path along the roadside. After climbing a flight of stone steps, one reaches a gazebo, beyond which the route transitions into a steep mountain trail. The designated section spans 585.80 meters, extending from the vicinity of this entrance to the point where the path intersects with the prefectural road once again.

=== Ehime Prefectural Designated Tangible Cultural Property ===
- Seated Wooden Statue of Dainichi Nyorai — Designated April 2, 1965

The principal image of this temple. Created in Kenji 1 (1275). It depicts Dainichi Nyorai of the Vajradhatu (Diamond Realm), wearing a jeweled crown and forming the *Chiken-in* (Wisdom-Fist Mudra). The statue stands 120.2 cm tall with a knee span of 92 cm; it is carved from *kaya* (Japanese nutmeg-yew) wood and features a large, circular halo attached to its back. It is a notable example of a regional artistic style.

- Seated Wooden Statue of Kobo Daishi — Designated September 14, 1979

Inscriptions in ink found within the statue reveal that it was created in Showa 4 (1315). The statue stands 87.5 cm tall and is constructed using the *yosegi-zukuri* (joined-block) technique with hinoki (Japanese cypress) wood; the interior has been hollowed out (*uchiguri*), and three smaller "womb-buddhas" are enshrined within. In terms of form, the statue features deeply carved facial contours—characteristic of the ambitious nature of Kamakura-period sculpture—yet it also exhibits a distinct regional character.

=== Uwajima City Designated Tangible Cultural Property ===
- Documents of Butsumokuji Temple — Designated November 3, 1962

== Access ==
=== Railway ===
- Shikoku Railway Company (JR Shikoku) – Yodo Line: Mutsu-da Station (3.5 km)

=== Bus ===
- Uwajima Bus: Alight at "Butsumokuji" (0.1 km)

=== Road ===
- Local Road: Prefectural Route 31 (Uwa-Mima Line) – Butsumokuji (0.1 km)

== Okunoin ==
Sōyō-an Kōsō-daishi

=== Sōgeian: The Sending-Off Daishi ===
Housed within a small, block-construction building situated at Hanaga Pass is a stone Buddha. The shrine enshrines the "Sending-Off Daishi" alongside six Jizō statues.33°19′34.9″N 132°33′46.5″E

== Preceding and Following Temples ==
=== Shikoku 88 Temple Pilgrimage ===
41 Ryūkō-ji -- (2.6 km [10]) -- 42 Butsumoku-ji -- (10.6 km [10]) -- 43 Akashi-ji ※Note: There are multiple routes for the pilgrimage path; the distances listed above are based on the standard route [10].

== See Also ==
- Shikoku 88 temple pilgrimage

== Bibliography ==
- 先達教典 (in Japanese). Shikoku 88ヶ所霊場会. 2006.
- 宮崎建樹 (2007). Shikoku遍路ひとり歩き同行二人 (in Japanese). Vol. 地図編 (第8版 ed.). へんろみち保存協力会.
- 有形文化財 彫刻（５９件）. 愛媛県文化財保護課サイト (in Japanese). 愛媛県.
